= Fan-Taz =

Carbonated beverage

Fan-Taz was a carbonated beverage sold in the early 20th century in the United States, Canada and Mexico. It was created by the Hessig-Ellis Drug Co. and its division, the Puro Manufacturing Company (formed in 1909).

Fan-Taz was red in color, and was marketed to baseball "fans", with ads showing baseball bats and baseballs. Fan-Taz syrup dispensers were shaped like baseballs and were used in drugstores, general stores, and ice cream parlors during the early 1900s, selling the product for 5 cents a glass.
