= Flick Home Run! =

2011 video game

- App icon in the App Store
- Developer: Infinity Pocket
- Platforms: iOS, Android
- Release: NA: October 15, 2011
- Genre: Sports

Flick Home Run! is a mobile baseball game developed by Infinity Pocket and released on October 15, 2011. It is available in two versions, paid and free, and can be downloaded from the App Store and Google Play Store.

== Gameplay ==
In Flick Home Run!, the objective is to swipe across the screen to hit a baseball that is being pitched to you. Depending on the game mode (Minor Challenge, Major Challenge, Moonstar Bonus, Multiplayer, Training, Bunt Master, Total Balls, Faster & Faster, Giant Unit, Moto Cutter, Moonstar Bonus II, or Called Shot) your objective is to either hit the ball as far as possible, land the ball in a specific zone, or hit the ball in an arc that will collide with certain bonus objects on the level. A round ends once the player misses the ball more times than stated. Players face different ball types that will move uniquely before arriving at the home plate. The game's objective is to get the score as high as possible.

== Reception ==
Flick Home Run! was generally well received by critics, receiving a score of 4 out of 5 stars from TouchArcade reviewer Troy Woodfield, who stated the game is "a simple concept which is well-executed by Infinity Pocket." Slide to Play reviewer Riordan Frost gave the game a 3 out of 4, suggesting that "the gameplay is fun enough that even non-sports fans will probably get a kick out of Flick Home Run."
