= The Center for Arts in Natick =

Organization in Massachusetts, US

Coordinates: 42.284°N 71.348°W

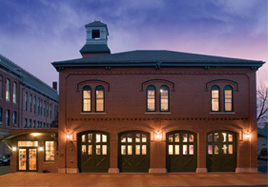
- Interactive map of The Center for Arts in Natick
- Location: 14 Summer Street, Natick, Massachusetts
- Owner: 501(c)(3) nonprofit organization
- Capacity: ~280

Construction
- Opened: 1997

Website
- natickarts.org

The Center for Arts in Natick, also known as TCAN (pronounced tee-can) in Natick, Massachusetts, is a regional community arts organization serving the cities and towns of MetroWest Boston. It has been in existence in various locations since 1997. The organization presents more than 300 events, classes and performances annually attended by over 30,000 patrons. TCAN was established as a 501(c)(3) nonprofit organization in 1997.

== History ==
In 1997, founding director Michael Moran envisioned a coffeehouse venue in Natick Center, serving as a center of cultural and social interaction and an informal club for artists and regular members. Leasing a small storefront at 31 Main Street in Natick Center with a seating capacity of 60 patrons, TCAN hosted frequent open mic programs for local songwriters, a weekly jazz jam, small community theatre productions and visual art exhibits by local artists. In time more programs were added including a regular all-ages rock concert featuring teen bands, a classical music series and family performances for young children. The organization relied extensively on volunteers to provide staffing for events and drive marketing/fundraising activities.

== Relocation to Natick Central Fire Station ==
The success of TCAN in its original location encouraged the organization to seek a larger and more permanent facility. After considering alternate locations, TCAN purchased the historic Central Fire Station from the Town of Natick in October 1998. Originally constructed in 1875 following a devastating fire in 1874, the Central Fire Station is located in the heart of Natick Center and is recognized in the National Register of Historic Places. A $2.5M restoration of the building included installation of a steel beam to allow use of 4,000 sq. ft. for the main performance space, reconstruction of the historic cupola that sits atop the hose drying tower, restoration of windows and masonry, installation of a new roof, and the return of the modified two double-bay entrances to the original four arched bays, complete with opening wood doors. The new TCAN facility, with four times as much seating capacity (270 seats), was opened as a performing arts center in May 2003.

== Management and Volunteers ==
In March 2004, shortly after relocation to the larger venue, TCAN's Board of Directors hired David Lavalley as its new executive director. The decision to part ways with founding director Michael Moran was met with local controversy and the departure of some volunteers, who protested his termination. TCAN is governed by an elected volunteer Board of Directors, run by a staff of full-time and part-time employees and supported by over 240 active volunteers. TCAN relies on volunteers to produce events, staff its box office and support all facets of marketing, fundraising and operations.

Erin Basile was appointed by the TCAN Board of Directors as TCAN's third Executive Director, effective January 1, 2026. David Lavalley was named Executive Director Emeritus in the same announcement, in recognition of his contributions to TCAN during his 22-year tenure as Executive Director.

== Mission and Programs ==
TCAN is unique in providing a wide variety of programming, ranging from nationally known touring musicians to local performers, theatre, comedy, arts education classes and family programs.

Featured Performances - Concerts feature well-known touring musicians and bands spanning folk, blues, contemporary, rock, jazz, fusion and classical music. See List of Notable Performances.

Art House Cinema - The TCAN Screening Room, a 120-seat digital cinema venue, was added in a 2016 renovation. Screenings of classic films and new releases are held weekly including feature films, documentaries and classic movies.

TCAN Players - TCAN is home to its own community theatre troupe, who present three productions each year. Auditions are open to the public. TCAN Players, including their productions, cast and crew have been nominated and received DASH awards by the Eastern Massachusetts Association of Community Theatres.

Folk Open Mic - An Open Mic event for singer-songwriters and musicians of all genres.

Young Masters Series - A classical music series dedicated to presenting talented young classical musicians from around the world.

== Strategic Partnerships ==
TCAN has initiated strategic partnerships to strengthen programming and expand its audience.

In 2008, TCAN and the Danforth Museum in Framingham, Massachusetts, announced a strategic partnership to enhance program offerings and benefits for members of their respective organizations. In 2013, TCAN and the Walnut Hill School in Natick, Massachusetts, announced a partnership to share resources, facilities and expertise to advance their respective missions, enhance the Natick Center Cultural District, while also creating long-term sustainability for each organization. In partnership with Natick Service Council, South Middlesex Opportunities Council and United Way of TriCounty, TCAN offers a program called Smile in Every Seat that provides free access to TCAN's programming for economically disadvantaged people and families in Natick and surrounding communities.

Since 2012, TCAN has collaborated with The Verve Boston Natick, a hotel in the Tapestry Collection by Hilton Worldwide, to produce live music events in their Route 9 Natick location. These concerts have presented artists including Eddie Money, Loverboy, 10,000 Maniacs, The Smithereens, Lisa Marie Presley, Vertical Horizon, The Tubes and other national touring artists.

In 2021, TCAN presented its first outdoor live music event in a partnership with Belkin Family Lookout Farm in South Natick, featuring the group Carbon Leaf from Richmond, VA.

== List of Notable Performances ==
TCAN has featured thousands of performances on its stage, below is a partial list of artists who have performed at TCAN representing a variety of genres.

Artists inducted to the Rock and Roll Hall of Fame are recognized with an asterisk (*).

ALTERNATIVE

- 10,000 Maniacs
- Adrian Belew of King Crimson*
- Carbon Leaf
- Cowboy Junkies
- Ed Kowalczyk of Live (band)
- Robyn Hitchcock
- T Bone Burnett
- The Smithereens
- The Verve Pipe

BLUES

- Bettye LaVette
- Chris Smither
- Duke Robillard
- Gary Hoey
- James Cotton
- James Montgomery
- Jeff Daniels
- Jimmie Vaughan
- John P. Hammond
- Johnny A
- Leon Redbone
- Matt Schofield
- Robben Ford
- Ronnie Earl
- Rory Block
- The Blind Boys of Alabama

CLASSICAL

- Borromeo String Quartet
- Matt Haimovitz
- Matthew Aucoin
- Nathan Lee
- Paul Byrom
- Turtle Island String Quartet

COMEDY

- Brad Sherwood
- Colin Mochrie
- Jimmy Tingle
- Lenny Clarke
- Paula Poundstone
- Rachel Dratch of SNL
- Robert Klein
- Sandra Bernhard
- Steve Sweeney
- The Second City

COUNTRY

- Asleep at the Wheel
- Edwin McCain
- Gibson Brothers
- Iris Dement
- The Jayhawks
- Kathy Mattea
- Lori McKenna
- Pure Prairie League
- Sam Bush
- Shelby Lynne
- Sierra Hull
- Suzy Bogguss
- Taylor Hicks

FOLK

- Cheryl Wheeler
- Darlingside
- Eddie from Ohio
- Eileen Ivers
- John Gorka
- Leo Kottke
- Peter Yarrow
- Richie Havens
- The Kingston Trio
- Tom Paxton
- Tom Rush

JAZZ

- Al Di Meola
- Billy Cobham
- California Guitar Trio
- David Cullen
- David Sanborn
- Deborah Henson-Conant
- George Winston
- Grace Kelly
- Jake Shimabukuro
- Jane Monheit
- Jimmy Herring
- Joe Robinson
- Keiko Matsui
- Kenny Rankin
- Larry Carlton
- Michael Manring
- Ottmar Liebert
- Robin Spielberg
- Stanley Clarke
- Tom Scott
- Tommy Emmanuel
- Tony Levin
- Will Ackerman

POP

- Al Stewart
- Atlanta Rhythm Section
- Aztec Two-Step
- Ben Taylor
- Bruce Hornsby
- Chad & Jeremy
- Christopher Cross
- Colin Hay of Men at Work
- Crystal Bowersox
- Howie Day
- Joan Osborne
- Kenny White
- Landau Eugene Murphy, Jr.
- Lisa Marie Presley
- Marc Cohn
- Melanie Safka
- Morgan James
- Paula Cole
- Renaissance
- Richard Marx
- Rickie Lee Jones
- Rockapella
- Stephen Bishop
- Susanna Hoffs
- The Bacon Brothers
- The Left Banke
- The Proclaimers
- Thomas Dolby
- Vanessa Carlton

ROCK

- Ambrosia
- The Bottle Rockets
- Brad Delp of Boston (band)*
- Charlie Farren
- Clem Burke of Blondie*
- Dan Hicks
- Danny Seraphine of Chicago*
- Dave Davies of The Kinks*
- Dave Mason of Traffic (band)*
- Elliot Easton of The Cars*
- The Empty Hearts
- English Beat
- Enter the Haggis
- Eric Johnson (guitarist)
- The Fixx
- Felix Cavaliere of The Rascals*
- G. E. Smith of Saturday Night Live Band
- Gaelic Storm
- Graham Parker of The Rumour
- Greg Hawkes of The Cars*
- Jefferson Starship*
- Jeff Baxter of Steely Dan*
- Jim Messina of Loggins and Messina
- Jimmy Herring
- Jon Butcher
- Jordan Rudess of Dream Theater
- Lez Zeppelin
- Nick Lowe with Los Straitjackets
- Mark Farner of Grand Funk
- Marshall Crenshaw
- Martin Barre of Jethro Tull*
- Micky Dolenz of The Monkees
- The Motels
- Paul Kantner of Jefferson Airplane*
- Peter Tork of The Monkees
- Peter Wolf of The J. Geils Band
- Pousette-Dart Band
- Richie Furay of Buffalo Springfield*
- Roger McGuinn of The Byrds*
- Ronnie Spector of The Ronettes*
- Steven Page of Barenaked Ladies*
- Stick Men (prog band)
- Southside Johnny
- Tony Levin of King Crimson*
- Vanilla Fudge
- The Waifs
- Wishbone Ash

SINGER-SONGWRITER

- Anaïs Mitchell
- Antje Duvekot
- Catie Curtis
- Dar Williams
- Don McLean
- Ellis Paul
- JD Souther
- Jimmy Webb
- John Sebastian of Lovin Spoonful*
- Jonatha Brooke
- Jonathan Edwards
- Judy Collins
- Karla Bonoff
- Kate Taylor
- Livingston Taylor
- Loudon Wainwright III
- Lucy Kaplansky
- Martin Sexton
- Meg Hutchinson
- Patty Griffin
- Patty Larkin
- Richard Thompson
- Robyn Hitchcock
- Ruthie Foster
- Shawn Colvin
- Steve Forbert
- Susan Werner
- Suzanne Vega
- Todd Snider

== Awards and Grants ==
TCAN has been recognized with a number of grants and awards, including the following:

- 2005 - Massachusetts Historical Commission - Preservation Award for Adaptive Reuse
- 2005 - Natick Cultural Council - Certificate of Achievement
- 2006 - Natick Historical Commission - 2006 Preservation Award
- 2011 - Massachusetts General Court - Certificate of Recognition, Classical Music Series
- 2014 - Massachusetts Cultural Council - Cultural Facility Fund Grant
- 2016 - Natick Education Foundation - Shining Light Award, Community Business
- 2020 - MetroWest Daily News - Best Place To See a Concert
- 2020 - MetroWest Daily News - Best Live Theater
- 2021 - MetroWest Daily News - Best Live Theater (finalist)
- 2021 - MetroWest Daily News - Best Place To See a Concert (finalist)
- 2022 - MetroWest Daily News - Best Live Music/Concert Venue
- 2022 - MetroWest Daily News - Best Nonprofit/Charity Organization
- 2022 - MetroWest Daily News - Best Live Theater (finalist)
- 2022 - MetroWest Daily News - Best Tourist/Seasonal Attraction - Local (finalist)
- 2023 - MetroWest Daily News - Best Live Music/Concert Venue (finalist)
- 2023 - MetroWest Daily News - Best After School/Summer Camp Program (finalist)
- 2023 - MetroWest Daily News - Best Non-Profit/Charity Organization (finalist)
- 2024 - MetroWest Daily News - Best Live Music/Concert Venue

In 2009 CNNMoney.com named Natick, Massachusetts #8 in its list of Best Places for a Healthy Retirement, citing The Center for Arts in Natick and Natick Mall as key amenities.

Natick Center in Natick, Massachusetts, was awarded the designation of Cultural District by the Commonwealth of Massachusetts in 2012. TCAN and the Morse Institute Library were recognized as the cultural anchors of the District.

Executive Director David Lavalley was recognized by Middlesex Savings Charitable Foundation with its 2024 John R. Heerwagen Award for Nonprofit Leadership. Established in 2016, the John R. Heerwagen Award commends a nonprofit leader whose contributions have significantly enhanced the well-being of community residents within the Foundation's community.

== Other Facts of Interest ==
The hose drying tower of the firehouse was originally used to hang canvas fire hoses after use, slowing the deterioration caused if the hoses were not dried thoroughly. The tower is now topped by a replica of the original cupola, designed and constructed in 2006 entirely by a group of volunteers led by Ken Soderholm and Jay Ball. The cupola was built from materials donated by local businesses.

Several performing artists have released recordings of live performances at TCAN. These include the following recordings:

- 2006 Jonathan Edwards Live in Massachusetts
- 2007 Aztec Two-Step Live at TCAN 35th Anniversary Concert DVD
- 2011 Susan Werner Live: The Center for Arts in Natick
- 2013 Ronnie Earl Just For Today

Scenes included in the 2013 American drama film Labor Day (film) starring Kate Winslet, Josh Brolin and Tobey Maguire were filmed in The Center for Arts in Natick.
