= Juiced ball theory =

Theory that baseballs were altered to increase performance

The "juiced ball" theory suggests that the baseballs used in Major League Baseball (MLB) have been deliberately altered by the league in order to increase scoring. The theory first came to prominence in the 1990s to early 2000s, but the theory receded once it became clear that the more likely explanation for the increase in scoring during that time was an increase in steroid use, as documented in the Mitchell Report in 2007. The juiced ball theory made a resurgence in the late 2010s, as a noticeable uptick in offensive output, especially home runs, was observed.

== 1990s to early 2000s ==
According to the juiced ball theory, it was said that a "juiced" ball bounces off the bat at a higher speed. Johnny Oates observed hits being made off pitches that should not have been elevated. In 2000, Jim Sherwood, a professor at UMass Lowell, was hired to test the baseballs manufactured in the Rawlings facility in Costa Rica. The tests and regulations for MLB baseballs were described in detail. He said that he did not expect to find any change from the manufacturing process that had been used for the previous 16 years or more. Various baseball manufacturers in the United States also agreed that the theory is nonsense, as there are multiple quality checks in place. The stitchers interviewed did not even know what a juiced ball was. On the other hand, there is an argument that their livelihood depends on baseball sales, which may increase if the balls are juiced.

Many pitchers felt that the balls became harder and traveled faster. Some pitchers performed their own tests. Kenny Rogers found that the ball in the center of each baseball was made of rubber, rather than the old cork. Billy Koch found that when dropped from the same height, the rubber balls from 2000 bounced 2 to 4 inches (5 to 10 cm) higher than rubber balls from 1999.

In 2000, Frank Deford, a writer for Sports Illustrated, interviewed Sandy Alderson, an MLB vice president, to discuss the possibility of a conspiracy by MLB to doctor the balls. Alderson denied this possibility, and Deford also discredited it as a conspiracy theory.

Some players in the 2002 World Series complained that the balls were juiced after an 11–10 game. Alderson denied these allegations.

The "Juiced Ball Theory" receded in popularity since the exposure of widespread use of steroids and other performance-enhancing drugs by professional baseball players during the same period, providing a more likely explanation for the increased numbers of home runs.

== Late 2010s ==
During the 2017 MLB season, a record-breaking 6,104 home runs were hit in the major leagues, surpassing the record of 5,693 set in 2000, during the height of the steroid era. Beginning that season, several commentators pointed out the surge in home run rate and pointed to the 2015 All-Star Break as a likely beginning point for a change in baseball composition, if there was one. In an article for The Ringer in 2017, Ben Lindbergh and Mitchel Lichtman tested three dozen game-used balls and found evidence that in 2015 the balls became slightly bouncier, and in 2016, the balls became slightly smaller and with lower seams. New York Mets manager Terry Collins said, "The seams on the ball are definitely lower. I think that’s why everybody is having blister problems all of a sudden. And there’s no question that the ball is harder." The following month San Francisco Giants pitcher Johnny Cueto stated that he strongly suspected that a "tighter" baseball was the cause of the first blisters in his career. MLB commissioner Rob Manfred repeatedly denied allegations that modern baseballs are "juiced" throughout 2017, maintaining that baseballs continue to be tested and fall within their designated measurable limits.

In March 2018, research by FiveThirtyEight's Rob Arthur found evidence of significant difference in the composition of the cores of baseballs produced after 2015 and before. Several months later, the MLB received the results of its own scientific study, looking into the increase in home run rate since 2015, and acknowledged that the increase was due, at least in part, to "a change in the aerodynamic properties of the baseball". The report suggested several steps to address the issue. Researchers Brian J. Love and Michael L. Burns, writing for The Conversation, identified other factors that could be contributing to the changing baseball composition, including lowering quality of cork supplied worldwide due to climate change, and new standards for humidity control for storing baseballs at MLB stadiums.

In June 2018 it was announced that MLB had teamed up with a private equity firm to purchase Rawlings, the longtime manufacturers of the baseballs used by MLB, for a reported $395 million. Regarding the decision to purchase Rawlings, Chris Marinak, the executive vice president for strategy, technology and innovation for MLB said, "We are particularly interested in providing even more input and direction on the production of the official ball of Major League Baseball, one of the most important on-field products to the play of our great game." The purchase of Rawlings by MLB has fueled fan concerns over a possible conspiracy by MLB to boost the offense as a way to combat low attendance and TV ratings.

In 2019, the juiced ball theory came to the forefront once again, as the major leagues were on pace to hit 6,668 home runs as of the All-Star break, which would smash the 2017 record of 6,105. (Note: The actual end-of-season total was 6,776.) The Triple-A-level minor leagues also saw a sharp increase in home runs, 58% over the previous year, (Note: 57% in the International League, 59% in the PCL.) after switching to the same ball used in the majors. Pitcher Emilio Pagan said, "To see the big league ball fly for the first time—it's pretty mind-blowing. Guys that had never seen it before, well, it's hard to put into words how much farther the big league ball goes, because it's spun tighter."

Shortly before the 2019 Major League Baseball All-Star Game, Manfred acknowledged the difference in the balls, saying, "Our scientists that have been now studying the baseball more regularly have told us that this year the baseball has a little less drag. [...] We are trying to understand exactly why that happened and build out a manufacturing process that gives us a little more control over what's going on. But you have to remember that our baseball is a handmade product and there's gonna be variation year to year." All-Star Game starting pitcher Justin Verlander said that the balls used in MLB games are "a fucking joke" and that he believes "100 percent" that the league has implemented juiced balls to increase offense. A study by Meredith Wills that examined 43 baseballs from the 2020 season found that 28 were 'standard' baseballs, while the other 15 were made lighter by around 6 grams per ball, with a few grams being removed from the inner yarn and centre of the baseball.

After years of complaints from multiple pitchers around the game, before the 2022 season Manfred said, "Every baseball that's in use in '22 was produced under the new manufacturing process...and in fact, the process has resulted in a more consistent baseball.". However, a Business Insider investigative report found that three different balls were used in the 2022 season. In particular, the "Goldilocks" ball (one that had increased exit velocities and launch relative to its peers), which was typically used in the All Star Game or postseason games, was found to have been used in multiple New York Yankees games. As Business Insider said, "Finding these balls might, in any other year, seem unremarkable. But this season, Yankees slugger Aaron Judge was in the midst of an historic home run chase. On October 4, at the Rangers' Globe Life Field, Judge broke the American League record for home runs, with 62."

In 2025, Eric Decker wrote an article the claimed that juiced balls may have made a return, with a 10% increase in home runs being noted, though the claim is disputed due to the article being written in an early stage of the season, and that variable weather had played a significant factor.

== See also ==
- Black Sox Scandal
- Major League Baseball scandals
- Doping in baseball
- Mitchell Report
- Biogenesis scandal
- 1998 Major League Baseball home run record chase
