= Oldtown Folks =

1869 novel by Harriet Beecher Stowe

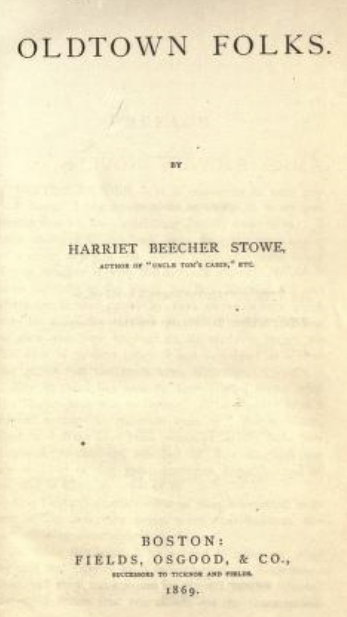
- Title page for Oldtown Folks (1869)
- Author: Harriet Beecher Stowe
- Language: English
- Publisher: Fields, Osgood, and Co. (1st ed.)
- Publication date: 1869 (1st ed.)
- Publication place: United States

Oldtown Folks is an 1869 novel written by Harriet Beecher Stowe. It is written from the first-person perspective of a young man named Horace Holyoke, who describes his youth in fictional Oldtown, Massachusetts – including humorous depictions of daily life, behavior of local towns folk, and the adoption of Harry and Eglantine Percival.

The novel incorporates some spiritual elements, such as deep discussions of God, religious revelations, and visions of ghosts. The story's themes include adoption, schooling, love, death, marriage, and familial secrets. The prose specifically addresses the reader and subverts tropes with plot twists.

Oldtown is a fictional name for the real town of Natick, Massachusetts, the native home of Harriett Beecher Stowe's husband, and many of the ideas in the book come primarily from his memories. Oldtown Folks has claim to be read as a religious novel and often discusses Puritan lifestyles as well as Calvinism and Arminian theology. In addition to these concepts and also the nature of a utopian society, this novel focuses on the question of reproduction and mothering. Written from the perspective of the main character, Horace Holyoke, the novel follows his life in post-American Revolution New England.

It is divided into two volumes based on the age of Horace and his friends.

== Synopsis ==
=== Volume 1 ===
==== Introduction ====
The story begins with Horace Holyoke remembering Oldtown as he had known it when he was young. He describes the town and then his father's life as a teacher at the local academy where he met Horace's mother, Susy Badger, who was his prettiest student. Life and parenthood were hard on the couple. His mother's beauty faded and his father's health was weakened by his attempts to provide for his family while trying to continue his studies. His father then died of consumption when Horace was only ten and his brother Bill was about twelve.

Horace and his mother were going to live with his grandparents so that he could continue his studies. His brother went to work on the farm with their uncle Jacob Badger. Deacon Badger, Horace's grandfather is a farmer and miller in Oldtown and is a fairly important figure in the community. Horace finds comfort from his grandparents and also from Sam Lawson, the town bum, handyman, and gossip. The Badgers' kitchen is a type of meeting place for people in the town. While there, Horace hears stories of the town and also intellectual discussions on religion and philosophy. This causes his hunger for knowledge to grow even more.

==== New folks ====
Harry and Eglantine (Tina) Percival come into the story a few years later when they walk into a nearby town with their sick mother. They are on their way to Boston because their father, Sir Harry Percival, an English officer, deserted his family when his regiment returned to England. He took his wife's wedding certificate with him and left behind only a note denying the legality of their marriage. The children come into the care of the nice Mrs. Smith. However her husband, Caleb (Old Crab) Smith, is a very unhappy man and decides they needed to be put to work immediately and separated. He intends to keep the boy as a field hand, and Tina is taken in by Caleb's sister, Miss Asphyxia. The children are treated so harshly that they run away with the help of Miss Asphyxia's hired help, Sol. They are told to walk to the neighboring Oldtown. On the way they spend a night in the reportedly haunted Dench Mansion on the outskirts of Oldtown where they are discovered the next day by Sam.

Harry and Tina are brought to Deacon Badger and his wife to be looked after. Within a few days, it is decided that Harry is to remain with the Badgers. The minister's wife, Mrs. Lothrop's, decided she would pay for the boy's clothing and education to help out the Badgers. Miss Mehitable Rossiter, who lived a sad, deprived life after the disappearance of her half sister Emily, adopts Tina. Horace, Harry, and Tina become best friends from that time on.

Mrs. Lothrop takes the children to Boston with her for Easter. They visit the very kind and wealthy Madame Kittery, Mrs. Lothrop's mother. Madame Kittery became very interested in Horace and learned of his desire to attend college and also of his lack of funds. She decided to pay for his and Harry's attendance to Harvard when they were old enough. While in Boston they meet Ellery Davenport, Mrs. Lothrop's cousin, who had served in the Continental army and had several diplomatic posts abroad. He was very handsome and charming but had a mad wife. Over Thanksgiving, Ellery Davenport and Mrs. Lothrop's sister, Deborah, went to Oldtown for a visit. Ellery paid particular attention to the pretty, young Tina. On the departure of the visit, Ellery promises Miss Mehitable that he will look for her lost sister in France when he is next there.

=== Volume 2 ===
==== Cloudland Academy ====
The three children are older now. Horace and Harry are eighteen and Tina is about fifteen and she had become even more beautiful. The schoolmaster and then Miss Mehitable's cousin, Mordecai, fall in love with her. It is decided that she, along with Horace and Harry, will attend the academy at Cloudland where Jonathan Rossiter, Miss Mehitable's half brother, is master of the academy. The boys live with Mr. Rossiter, and Tina with the minister, Mr. Avery. Mr. Avery's daughter, Esther, becomes the newest addition to the group of best friends.

==== Harvard ====
Harry decides to study for the ministry after graduation. He also falls in love with Esther while at Cloudland. Horace simply wants to live his life with Tina, whom he has loved since they first met. Shortly before their graduation from the academy, Ellery Davenport returns from England with important news for Harry. He found Sir Harry Percival and was able to get the marriage certificate from him because young Harry was now his only heir. During Ellery's visit, Tina is strangely shy and Horace could tell she was smitten with him.

Horace and Harry soon enter Harvard as sophomores. Tina visits often when she stays with the Kitterys or writes letters to them when she is in Oldtown. A change in the letters causes Horace to begin to worry about Ellery Davenport's influence on her. A short time later, he hears that Ellery's insane wife has died. Then they learn that Harry's father has also died and Harry is now Sir Harry Percival, an heir to a large estate. The two friends return to Oldtown for the spring vacation where they find out that Tina is engaged to marry Ellery.

==== Marriage ====
Since Ellery has to return to his job in London so quickly, the wedding occurs very shortly after the engagement. After the ceremony, Ellery and Tina were going to spend a short time in the fixed-up Dench mansion. However, when they arrive, they find a woman waiting for them in the house. The woman is Emily Rossiter, whom Ellery had contacted in France as asked, but then he seduced her. Emily followed him to America in refusal of his bribe to keep her quiet. Emily has also had a child with Ellery who she brought with to America.

Tina decides that she can not leave Ellery, so she goes to England with him and brings the young, bastard girl along to raise as her own. She gives money to Miss Mehitable to buy a house and live with Emily near Boston. She writes often, but her letters become increasingly unlike her. Ellery is being driven mad by his career and it takes its toll on Tina.

==== What came of it ====
Meanwhile, Harry marries Esther and they moved to England to take over his father's estate. Horace feels very alone at this point.

After eight years, Ellery and Tina move back to Massachusetts. Tina seems to be a completely different person. Horace is now a successful lawyer and visits them often. He witnesses Ellery becomes more reckless until he is killed in a political duel. Two years after that Horace and Tina finally get married. They visit Oldtown often to visit family and friends and to reminisce.

== Major characters ==
=== Horace Holyoke ===
Very ambitious and intelligent, Horace is the narrator of the story. His hard work and beneficial acquaintances allow him to follow his dream of studying in a college.

=== Eglantine (Tina) Percival ===
Tina is the sister of Harry Percival, and a witty, beautiful girl who charms everyone she meets. Tina faces a lot of hardship at a young age, eventually marrying Ellery Davenport, who dies after ten years, at which point which she marries Horace.

=== Harry Percival ===
Best friend of Horace, and Tina's brother, Harry is very industrious, even at a young age. After overcoming many obstacles, he is able to attend school and then college, where he decides to go into ministry. He marries Esther Avery and they move to England after his father's death.

== Other characters ==
Some of the more important minor roles include:

- Deacon Badger- Horace's grandfather whom he lives with after the death of his father. Deacon also takes in Harry. He is described as always smiling at something. He is very serene.
- Mrs. Badger- Horace's grandmother. She is a strict Calvinist and one of Horace's favorite people in the world.
- Madame Kittery- She is Mrs. Lothrop's mother and very wealthy and kind. She pays for Horace and Harry to attend Harvard.
- Ellery Davenport- A handsome and charming man on the outside, but conniving and deceitful on the inside. He married a girl who went mad and during that time had an affair with at least one woman whom he impregnated. After the death of his first wife, he married Tina. They raised his bastard child together and he died eight years later.
- Esther Avery- A minister's daughter, she was a bright young lady who falls in love with Harry Percival when he studies at the same academy as her. They marry after graduation and move to England shortly after.
- Susy Badger Holyoke- Horace's mother who lives with her parents, Deacon and Mrs. Badger, after the death of her husband.
- Keziah Badger- She is one of Horace's spinster aunts and the daughter of Mr. and Mrs. Badger.
- Lois Badger- The other spinster aunt of Horace. She is very sharp on the outside, but she loves her family and will do her best to protect them.
- Sam Lawson- He's known through the town as good for nothing, but he is handier than anyone else in the state. He just takes so long to finish what he's started. He always has news and is a good friend to Horace and the Badgers.
- Caleb (Old Crab) Smith- Takes in Harry at first after his mother dies, but he works the kid too hard and refuses to let him see his sister.
- Asphyxia Smith- Caleb Smith's sister who takes Tina in. She will not allow any playtime and hates all pretty things because there is no point for them. She doesn't understand how to care for a child and is mean, so Tina runs away with Harry.
- Miss Mehitable Rossiter- Takes in Tina after the Percivals run away from the Smiths. She was depressed after her half sister disappeared, and it cheered her up to have a young girl to take care of. She loved Tina dearly.
- Polly- Miss Mehitable's maid who does not like change but learns to love Tina as much as her mistress.
- Emily Rossiter- Miss Mehitable's half-sister who ran away. She became pregnant with Ellery's child while in France, but she ended up returning home to Oldtown.
- Jonathon Rossiter- Miss Mehitable's half-brother who is the master of the academy at Cloudland. He boards Harry and Horace while they attend school there.
- Mr. Avery- The minister at Cloudland who boards Tina during her time there. He is the father of Esther Avery.
- Mrs. Lothrop- The minister's wife, she is a very important figure in town. She comes from a family with money and helps provide for Harry and Horace.
- Miss Deborah (Debbie) Kittery- Miss Mehitable's sister and Madame Kittery's daughter. She loves Tina, Harry, and Horace immediately and helps care for them.
- Sol- He works for Miss Asphyxia and helps Harry and Tina escape. He helps spread news about the children and anything else he hears.
