= Harwood Baseball Factory =

World's first baseball factory

- Factory building c. 1867 – c. 1877
- Alternative names: H. Harwood & Sons Factory

General information
- Location: 12 Walnut St., Natick, Massachusetts, United States
- Year built: 1858
- Closed: 1976

Design and construction
- Known for: World's first baseball factory
- The Harwood Baseball Shop
- U.S. Historic district – Contributing property
- Coordinates: 42°17′10.4″N 71°20′52.8″W
- Part of: Natick Center Historic District (ID77000186)
- Designated CP: December 16, 1977

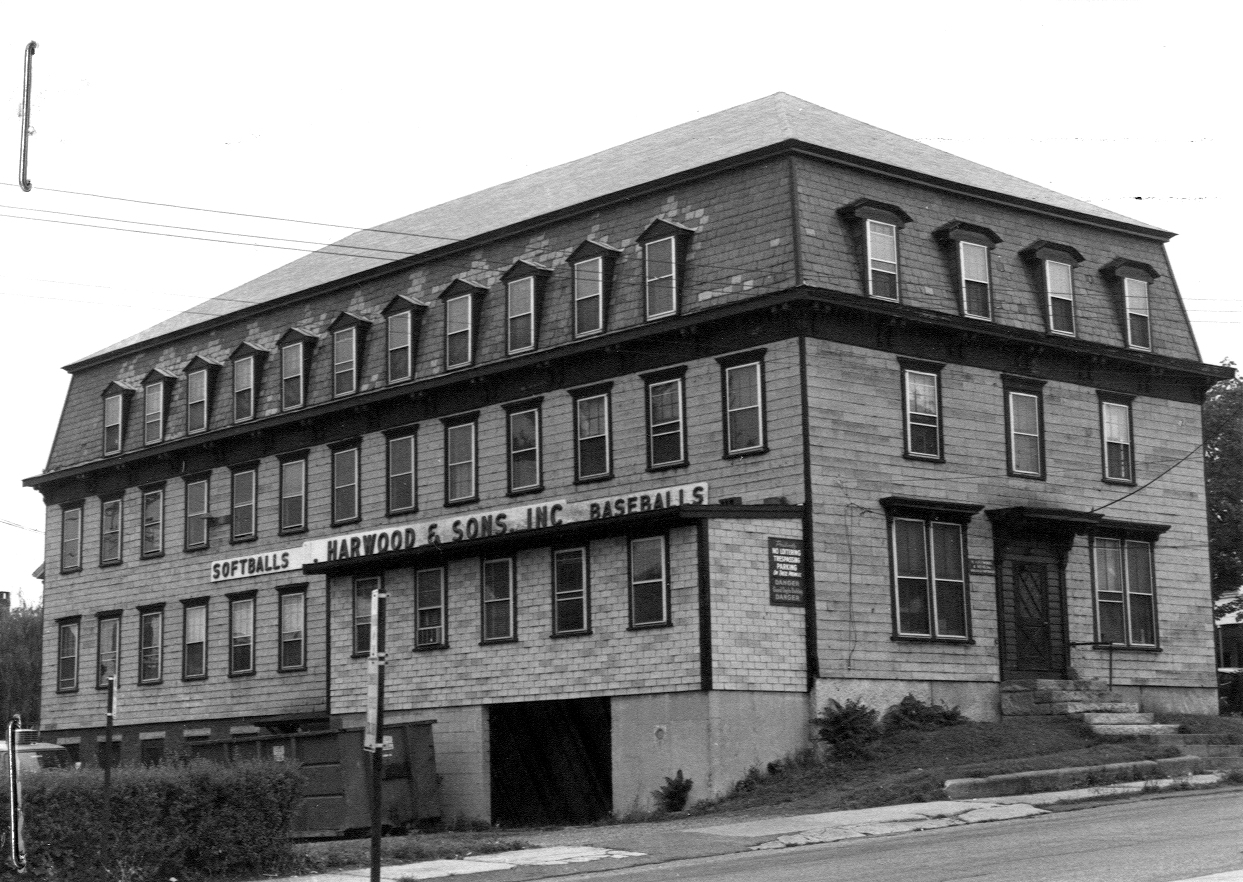
Harwood factory in 1977

The Harwood Baseball Factory (also referred to as the H. Harwood & Sons Baseball Factory) was the first factory to manufacture baseballs. The factory was in operation from 1858 to 1976 and is located in Natick, Massachusetts.

== Building ==
Built in 1858, the Harwood factory is a symmetrical three-story wooden building with more than 9,000 square feet (840 m^{2}) featuring a mansard roof and a partially exposed brick basement. Positioned on Walnut Hill, it faces south toward North Avenue and looks over Main Street. The structure includes a wide entablature with double wooden brackets supporting overhanging eaves, while the first and second-story windows feature projecting cornices. The south elevation contains eleven dormers topped with triangular pediments, while four dormers on the facade have truncated tops.

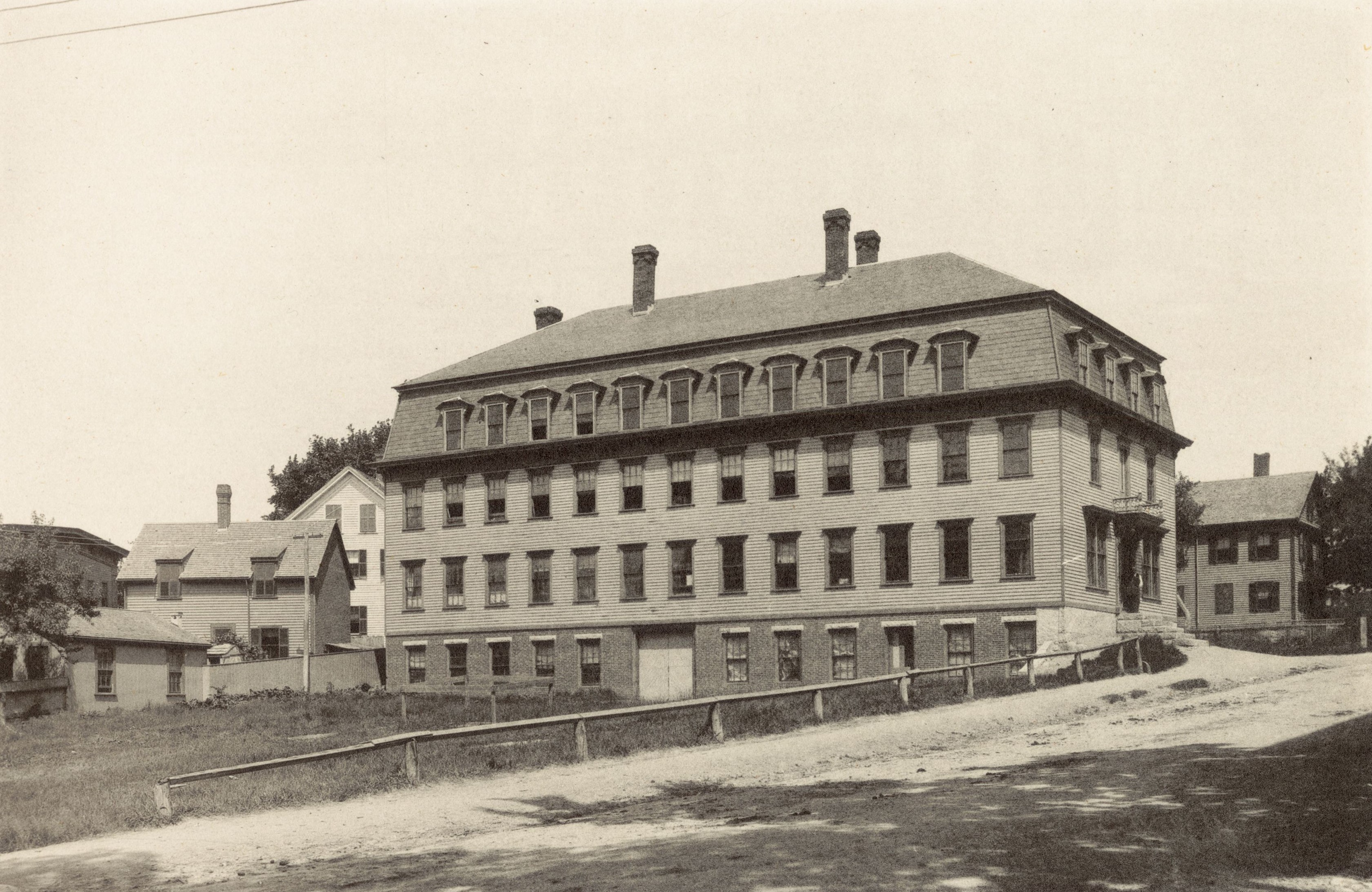
Factory c. 1900

== History ==
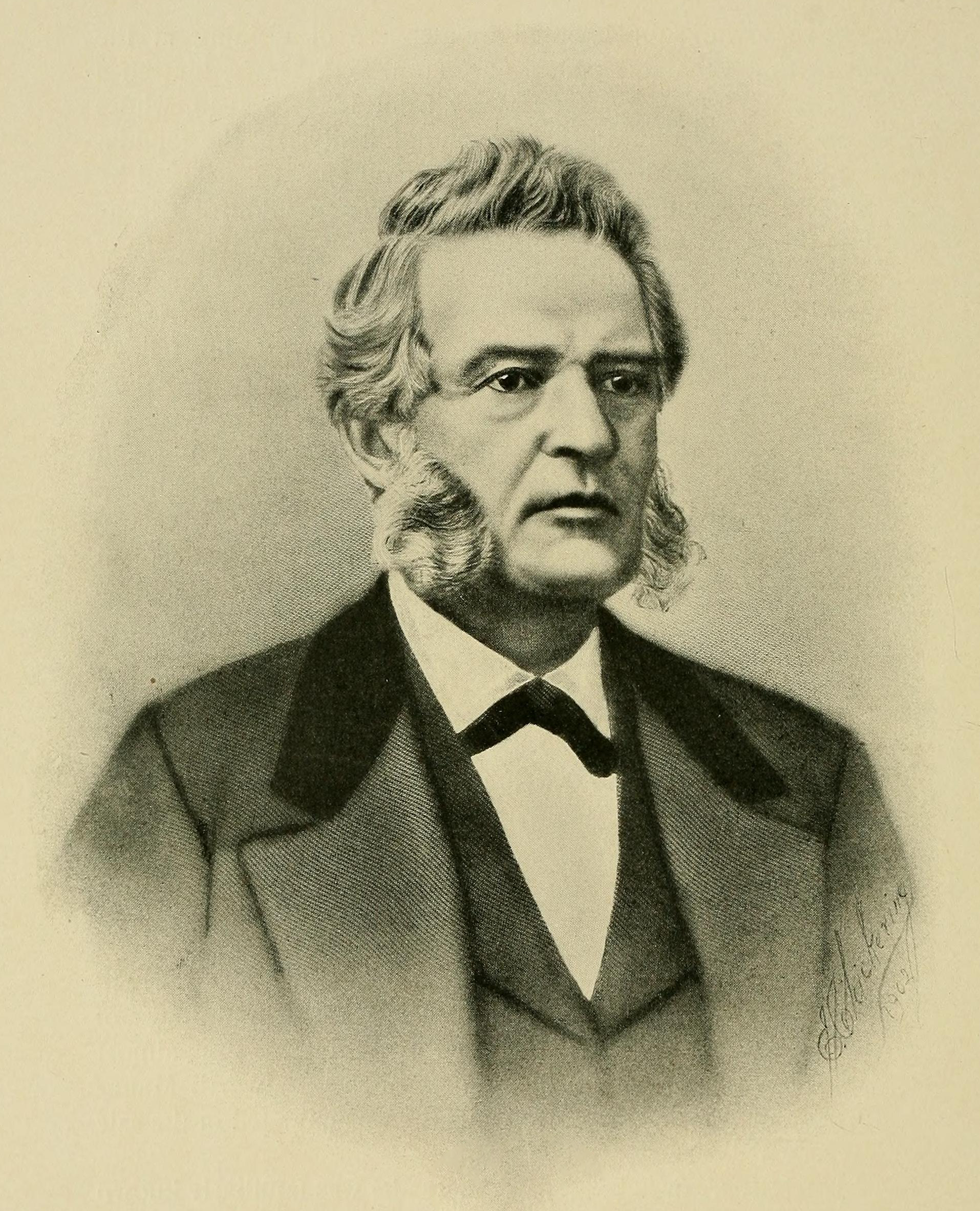
Harrison Harwood

Harrison Harwood was born October 18, 1814, in North Brookfield, Massachusetts. He attended Westminster Academy before going into business in Adrian, Michigan. At the age of 25, he returned to Massachusetts and lived in Oakham, Fitchburg, and Winchendon before settling in Natick in 1858. Harwood was a town selectman in 1871–72 and served for twelve years as a Middlesex County commissioner. Harwood was also a co-founder of the Natick National Bank and a director of the institution.

Before Harwood’s factory, baseballs were handmade by individual craftsmen, leading to inconsistencies in size, shape, and materials. Harwood’s factory introduced standardized baseballs, implementing innovations such as the wound core and the figure-eight stitching pattern, which are still used in modern baseballs. The figure-eight stitching was originally developed by Ellis Drake in the 1840s and was later mass-produced by H. Harwood & Sons. Some historians, attribute the design to William A. Cutler, who sold it to Harwood in 1858.

Harwood employed over 200 women and organized the factory into specialized work areas, with each group handling a specific task. One team was responsible for cutting the figure-eight covers, which were then passed to another group that punched holes along the edges for stitching. While earlier covers were made from sheepskin, the factory transitioned to more durable horsehide. To soften the tough material for sewing, workers wrapped it in damp cloths. The balls were wound at the factory, then the covers were put on by the women at their homes. High-quality baseballs were stitched with silk thread, while more affordable versions used linen. Once completed, the balls were left to dry for several days.

In 1871, the Harwood factory was described as “the greatest base ball manufactory in the world” and was noted as “the oldest established manufacturers of base balls in America,” filling single orders as large as 6,000 balls at a time.

The facility remained operational for over a century before closing in 1976 and being converted into residential condominiums.

Harwood died August 27, 1882, in Natick. Harwood was elected into the Sporting Goods Industry Hall of Fame in 1959.

== Related patents ==
- US 397303A, Newell, B. B., "BASE BALL WINDING AND ROLLING MACHINE", published 1889-02-05, assigned to H. Harwood
- US 397362A, Harwood, H., "MACHINE FOR WINDING BALLS", published 1889-02-05
- US 923762A, Brewer, Albert G., "BALL WINDING AND ROLLING MACHINE", published 1909-06-01, assigned to Harrison Harwood and Robert G. Harwood
- US 999482A, Brewer, Albert G. & Hawes, Edward H., "BALL WINDING AND ROLLING MACHINE", published 1911-08-01, assigned to H. Harwood and Sons
- US 88289S, Hawes, Edward H., "DESIGN FOR A BALL", published 1932-11-15, assigned to H. Harwood & Sons
- US 1994703A, Hawes, Edward H., "BASEBALL", published 1935-03-19, assigned to H. Harwood & Sons Inc.
- US 2645487A, Hawes, Edward H., "BASEBALL", published 1953-07-14, assigned to H. Harwood & Sons Inc.
