= Henry Wilson Shoe Shop =

- U.S. National Register of Historic Places
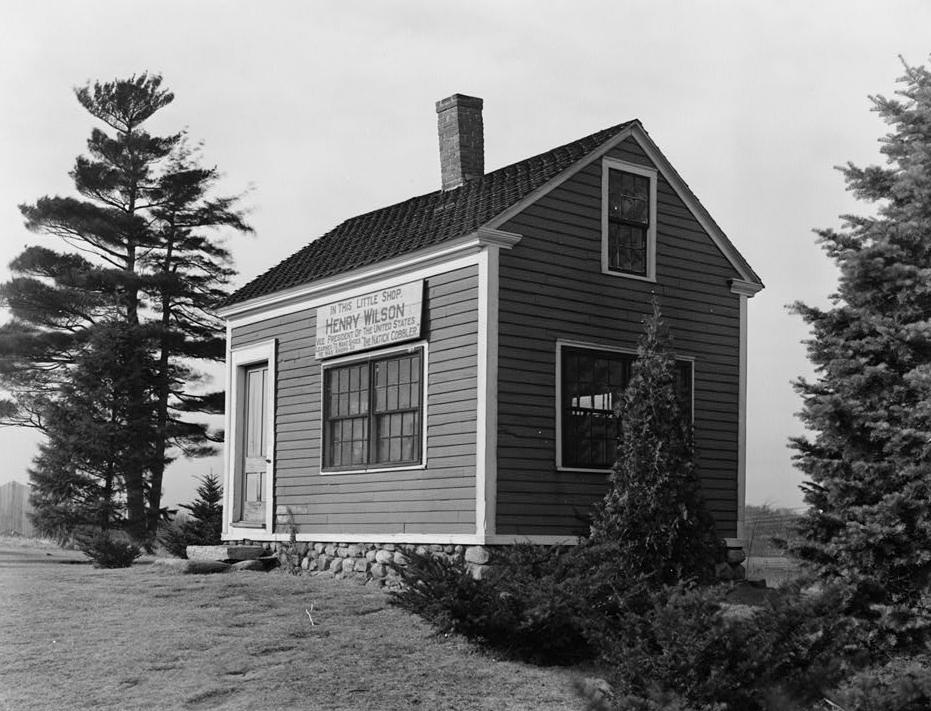
- Henry Wilson Shoe Shop, ca. 1937
- Location: 181 West Central Street, Route 135; Natick, Massachusetts
- Coordinates: 42.28269°N 71.38087°W
- Built: 1850s
- NRHP reference No.: 00000955
- Added to NRHP: July 24, 2000

The Henry Wilson Shoe Shop is an historic "ten footer" building located at 181 West Central Street, Route 135 in Natick, Massachusetts, USA. Built in the 1850s, it was the shoe shop of Henry Wilson, a Senator from Massachusetts and the eighteenth Vice President of the United States. On July 24, 2000, it was listed in the National Register of Historic Places.

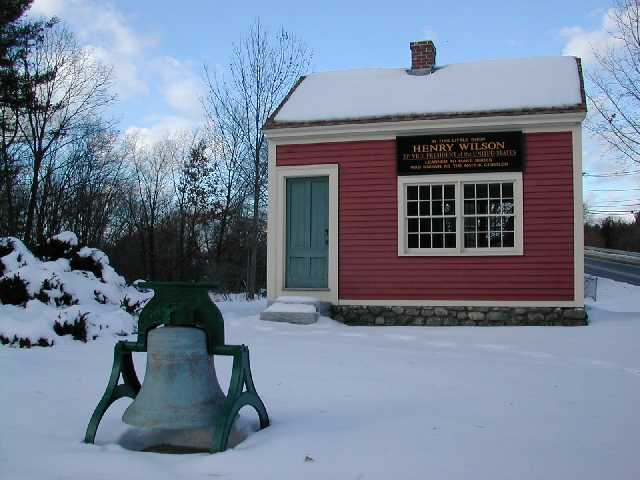
Henry Wilson Shoe Shop in 2003

A ten footer is a small backyard shop structure that was built in the 18th and 19th centuries in New England to serve as a shoemaker's shop. The name came from the fact that the floor dimensions were usually about 10 by 10 feet (3.0 by 3.0 meters). The ten footers were forerunners of the large shoe factories that developed in New England later in the 19th century.

== See also ==
- National Register of Historic Places listings in Middlesex County, Massachusetts

== Sources ==
- Hunter, Ethel A., The Ten-Footers of New England in Parks, Roger, editor, The New England Galaxy: The best of 20 years from Old Sturbridge Village, Chester Connecticut: Globe Pequot Press, 1980, pp. 134–139, ISBN 0-87106-040-X
