= Natick, Massachusetts =

Town in Massachusetts, United States

- Town
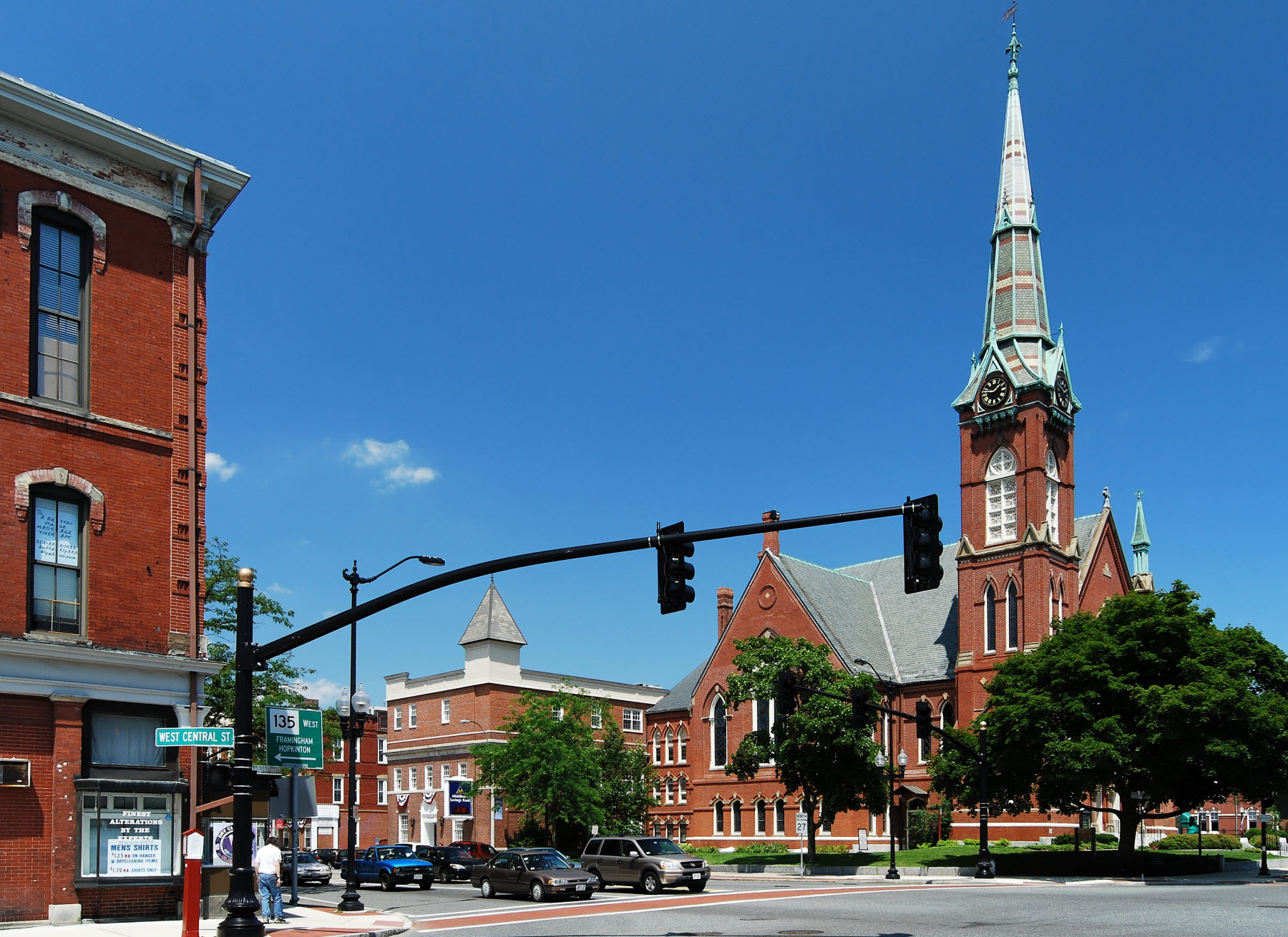
- Natick town center

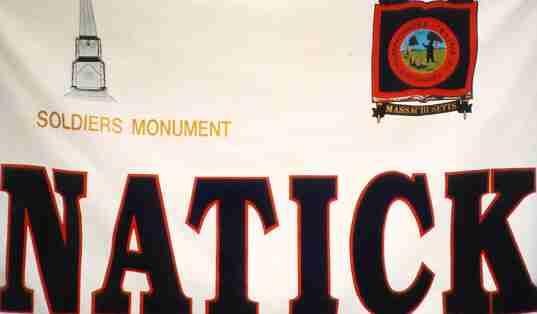
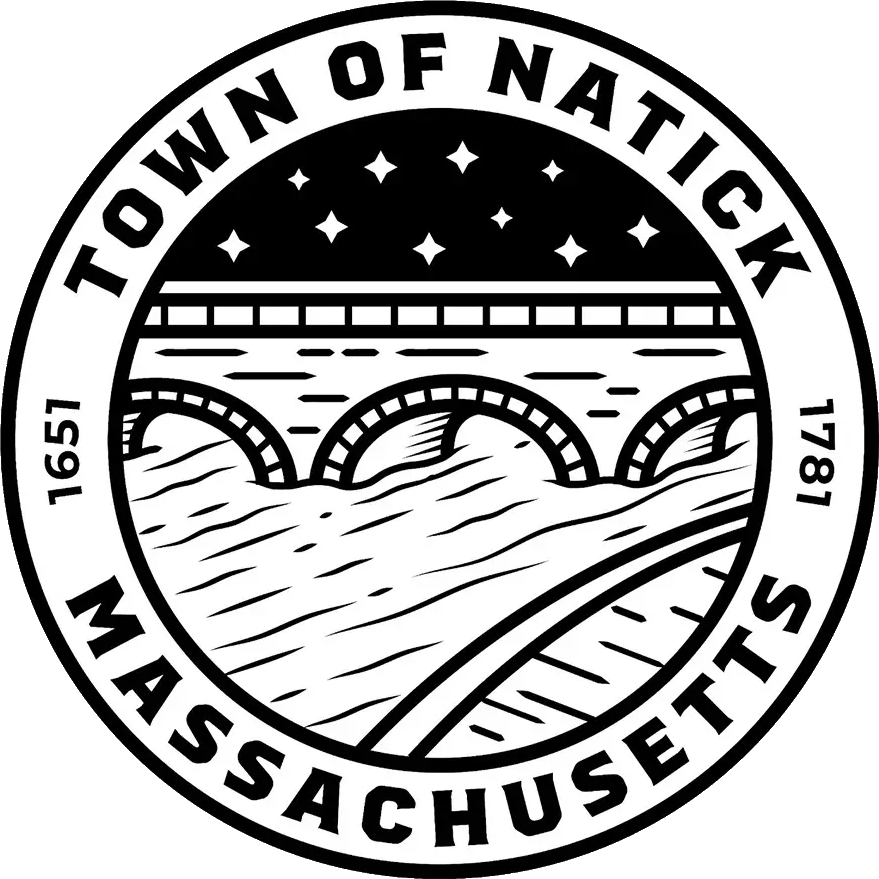
- Flag Seal
- Nickname: Home of Champions
- Location in Middlesex County in Massachusetts
- Coordinates: 42°17′00″N 71°21′00″W
- Country: United States
- State: Massachusetts
- County: Middlesex
- Settled: 1651
- Incorporated: 1781

Government
  - Type: Representative town meeting
  - Town Administrator: James Errickson

Area
  - Total: 16.1 sq mi (41.6 km^{2})
  - Land: 15.1 sq mi (39.1 km^{2})
  - Water: 0.97 sq mi (2.5 km^{2})
- Elevation: 180 ft (55 m)

Population (2020)
  - Total: 37,006
  - Density: 2,451/sq mi (946.4/km^{2})
- Time zone: UTC−5 (Eastern)
  - Summer (DST): UTC−4 (Eastern)
- ZIP Code: 01760
- Area code: 508/774
- FIPS code: 25-43895
- GNIS feature ID: 0619407
- Website: natickma.gov

Natick (/ˈneɪtɪk/ NAY-tik) is a town in Middlesex County, Massachusetts, United States. It is near the center of the MetroWest region of Massachusetts, with a population of 37,006 at the 2020 census. Ten miles (16 km) west of Boston, Natick is part of the Greater Boston area. Massachusetts's center of population was in Natick at the censuses of 2000–2020, most recently in the vicinity of Hunters Lane.

== Etymology ==
The name Natick comes from the language of the Massachusett Native American tribe and is commonly thought to mean "Place of Hills." A more accurate translation may be "place of [our] searching," after John Eliot's successful search for a location for his Praying Indian settlement.

== History ==
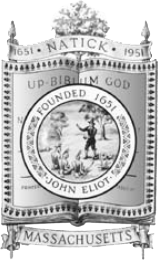
The former town seal of Natick, depicting John Eliot preaching to the Indians, set over a book representing the first Algonquian Bible

=== Praying Town ===
Natick was settled in 1651 by John Eliot, a Puritan missionary born in Widford, England, who received a commission and funds from England's Long Parliament to settle the Massachusett Indians called Praying Indians on both sides of the Charles River, on land deeded from the settlement at Dedham. Natick was the first of Eliot's network of praying towns and served as their center for a long time. While the towns were largely self-governing under Indian leaders, such as Waban and Cutshamekin, the praying Indians were subject to rules governing conformity to Puritan culture (in practice Natick, like the other praying towns, combined both indigenous and Puritan culture and practices). Eliot and Praying Indian translators printed America's first Algonquian language Bible. Eventually, the church in Natick was led for several decades by an indigenous pastor, Rev. Daniel Takawambait.

The colonial government placed such settlements in a ring of villages around Boston as a defensive strategy. Natick was the first and best documented settlement. The land was granted by the General Court as part of the Dedham Grant.

After a period of expansion and little focus on evangelism, Reverend John Robinson told the New Englanders to prioritize missionary work over growth, "the killing of those poor Indians....How happy a thing it had been if you had converted some before you had killed any." Chastened in the wake of the Mystic Massacre which occurred during the Pequot War, sincere efforts at evangelizing began. A school was set up, a government established, and the Indians were encouraged to convert to Christianity. In November 1675, during King Philip's War, the Natick Indians were sent to Deer Island. Many died of disease and cold, and those who survived found their homes destroyed. The Indian village did not fully recover, and the land held in common by the Indian community was slowly sold to white settlers to cover debts. By 1785, most of the Natick Indians had drifted away. After King Philip's War, Elliot's and a few other missionaries' opposition to the executions and enslavement of Indians were eventually silenced by death threats.

In 1775, both European and Indian citizens of Natick participated in the battles of Lexington, Concord and Bunker Hill, as well as serving in the Continental Army. The names of Natick's Praying Indian soldiers are memorialized on a stone marker, along with all of Natick's Revolutionary War veterans, on a stone marker on Pond Street, near downtown Natick.

=== Incorporated Town ===
The town was incorporated in 1781. Henry Wilson, a U.S. senator who became the 18th Vice President of the United States (1873–1875), lived most of his life in Natick as a shoemaker and schoolteacher known as the "Natick Cobbler" and is buried there. He is the namesake of one of Natick's middle schools.

Though Natick was primarily a farming town, the invention of the sewing machine in 1858 led to the growth of several shoe factories. The business flourished and peaked by 1880, when Natick, with 23 operating factories, was third in the nation in the quantity of shoes produced. The shoes made in Natick were primarily heavy work shoes with only one or two companies making lighter dress shoes. Natick was famous for its brogan, a heavy ankle-high boot worn by soldiers in the American Civil War.

The wound core for a more resilient baseball was developed by John W. Walcott and combined with the figure-eight stitching devised by Colonel William A. Cutler. It was manufactured by the firm of H. Harwood & Sons in their factory, the world's first plant for the manufacture of baseballs. In 1988 H. Harwood & Sons was converted into baseball factory condominiums.

In 1874, a fire in downtown Natick demolished 18 business blocks, two shoe factories, the Town Hall, Natick's only fire engine house and the Congregational Church, as well as many private homes. Though there were no deaths, the loss of property was greater in proportion to the town's wealth than the Great Chicago Fire of 1871. In 1875, Natick's new Central Fire Station was completed on Summer Street and opened with grand ceremony on the same city block where the fire was first discovered. The Central Fire Station is now the home of The Center for Arts in Natick (TCAN), a private nonprofit performing arts center.

In 1891, a team from the town fire department won "The World's Hook and Ladder Championship", a competition between the fire departments of four area towns. The victory gave the town its nickname "Home of Champions".

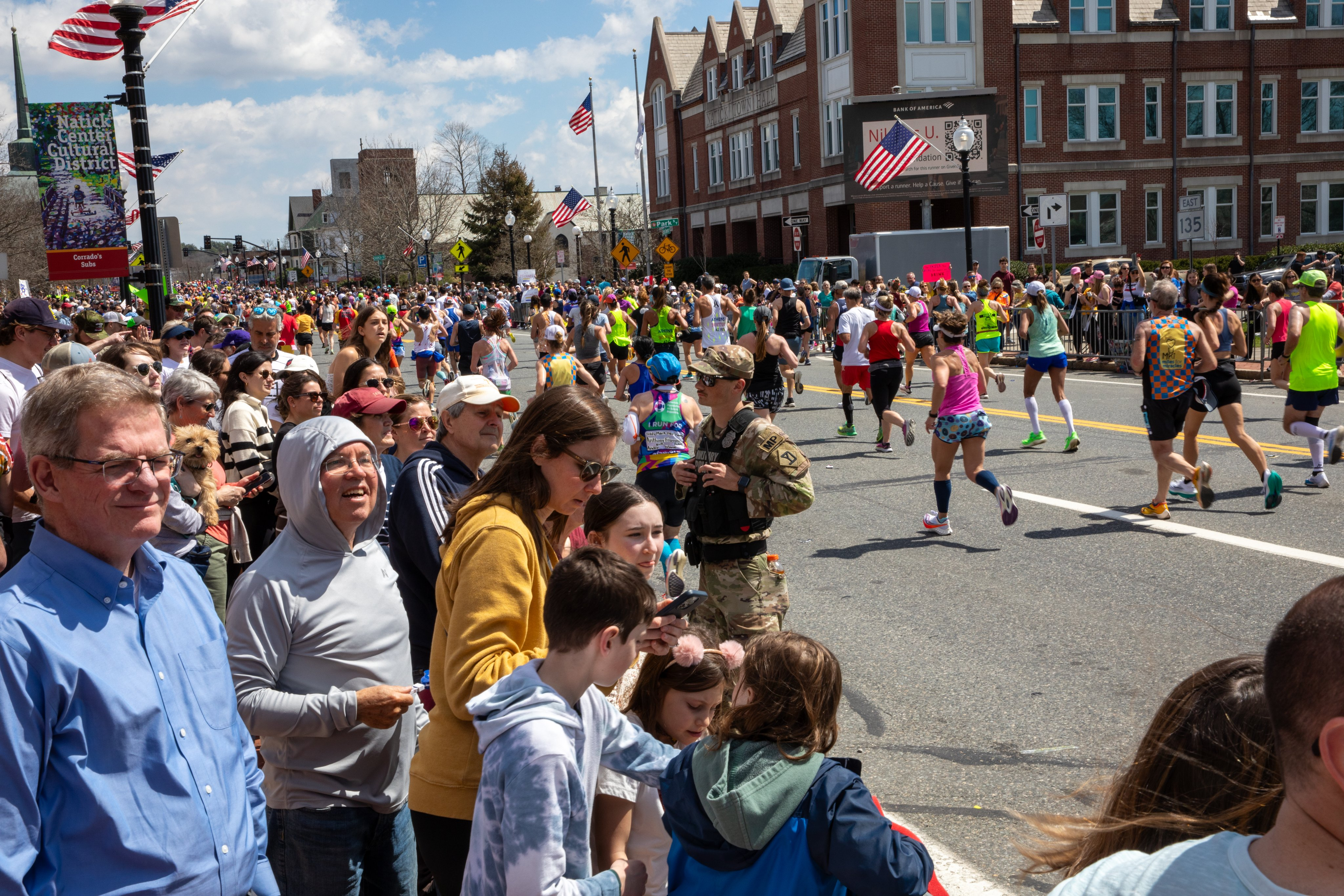
Spectators watch as competitors in the 2024 Boston Marathon pass through Natick during the race

Miles 8 through 12 of the Boston Marathon run through Natick on Patriots' Day every year along Route 135/Central St., and thousands of residents and visitors line the road to watch.

In December 2024, the town Select Board approved an amended immigration policy. The policy restricts town employees from gathering information about individuals' citizenship or immigration status. Additionally, it bars town employees from acting as immigration officers, though exceptions are made for actions pursuant to judicial warrants, subpoenas, or detainers related to immigration enforcement.

== Geography and climate ==
According to the United States Census Bureau, the town has an area of 16.0 square miles (41 km^{2}), of which 15.1 square miles (39 km^{2}) is land and 1.0 square mile (2.6 km^{2}) is water. The total area is 7.04% water, including Lake Cochituate and Dug Pond.

Natick borders Wellesley, Wayland, Weston, Framingham, Sherborn and Dover.

Climate data for Natick, Massachusetts (1991−2020 normals)
Month	Jan	Feb	Mar	Apr	May	Jun	Jul	Aug	Sep	Oct	Nov	Dec	Year
Mean daily maximum °F (°C)	35.2 (1.8)	38.2 (3.4)	46.1 (7.8)	58.0 (14.4)	67.7 (19.8)	76.5 (24.7)	81.8 (27.7)	80.4 (26.9)	73.0 (22.8)	61.7 (16.5)	51.3 (10.7)	40.7 (4.8)	59.2 (15.1)
Daily mean °F (°C)	26.4 (−3.1)	27.9 (−2.3)	35.7 (2.1)	46.6 (8.1)	56.7 (13.7)	66.2 (19.0)	71.8 (22.1)	69.9 (21.1)	62.4 (16.9)	50.7 (10.4)	41.2 (5.1)	31.8 (−0.1)	48.9 (9.4)
Mean daily minimum °F (°C)	17.5 (−8.1)	17.6 (−8.0)	25.4 (−3.7)	35.1 (1.7)	45.6 (7.6)	55.9 (13.3)	61.7 (16.5)	59.4 (15.2)	51.8 (11.0)	39.7 (4.3)	31.1 (−0.5)	22.9 (−5.1)	38.7 (3.7)
Average precipitation inches (mm)	3.37 (86)	3.07 (78)	3.95 (100)	4.07 (103)	3.78 (96)	4.14 (105)	3.85 (98)	3.82 (97)	4.21 (107)	4.83 (123)	3.74 (95)	4.43 (113)	47.26 (1,201)
Average snowfall inches (cm)	15.8 (40)	10.8 (27)	7.8 (20)	2.2 (5.6)	0 (0)	0 (0)	0 (0)	0 (0)	0 (0)	0 (0)	1.6 (4.1)	10.0 (25)	48.2 (122)
Average precipitation days (≥ 0.01 in)	10.3	9.2	10.3	11.1	12.4	11.3	9.8	9.7	9.0	10.2	11.0	10.7	125
Average snowy days (≥ 0.1 in)	5.4	3.8	2.6	0.4	0	0	0	0	0	0	0.7	3.4	16.3
Source: NOAA

== Communities and neighborhoods ==
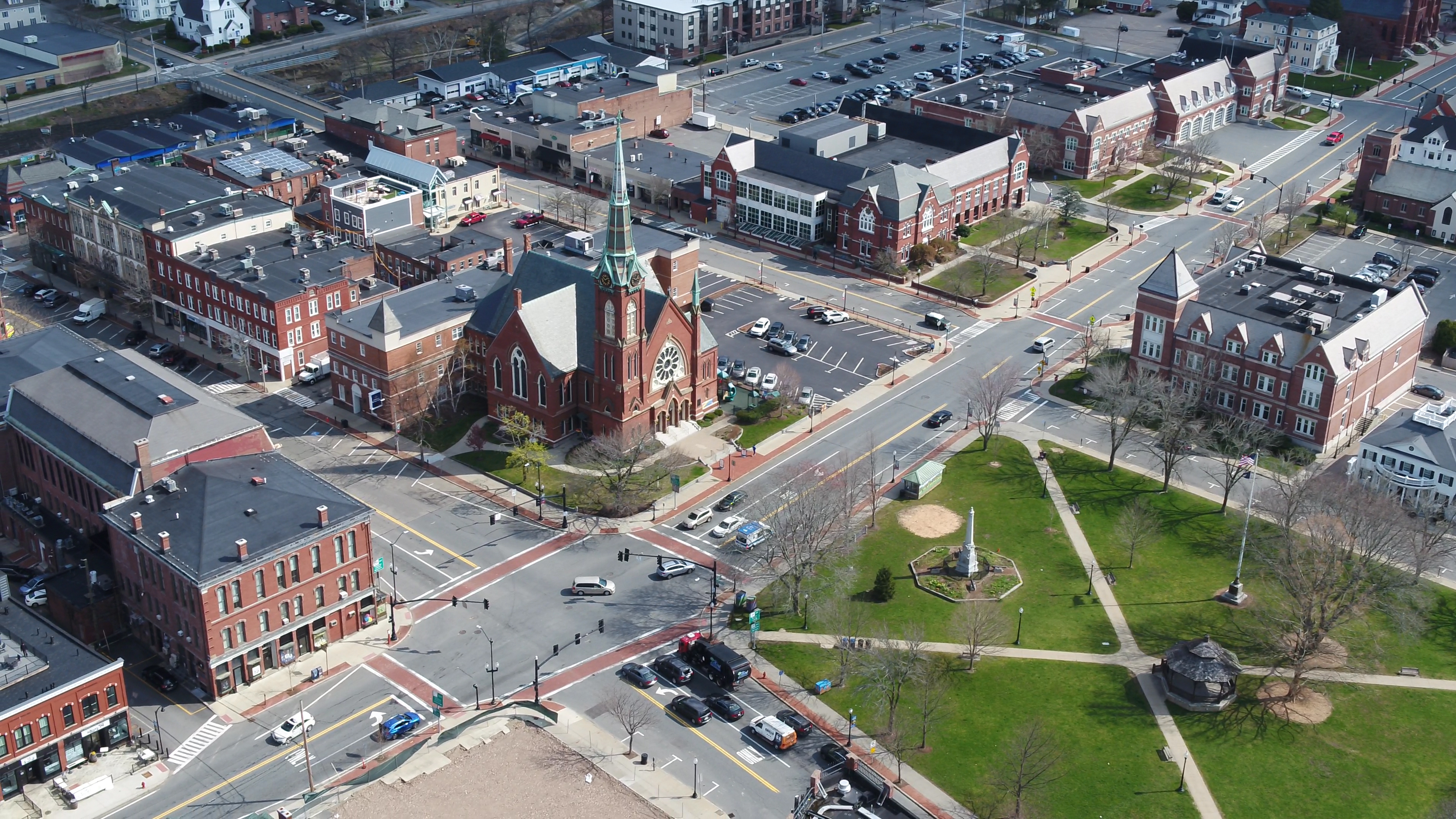
Natick Center Spring 2020

=== Natick Center ===
Natick Center, also known as Downtown Natick, is at the intersection of Central Street and Main Street and serves as the town's civic and cultural hub.

Many public services and public land use are downtown. Municipal buildings like the Natick Town Hall, Natick Fire Department, Natick Police Department and Morse Institute Library are there, along East Central Street. Also directly downtown is the Natick Town Common, where many town events and community activities are held. In the 1990s new downtown construction of a town hall, fire/police station, and enlargement to the library gave the downtown a fresh new look. New municipal buildings exist alongside several historic buildings and churches, the restored Central Fire House, several banks, restaurants and small businesses.

In 2012 the Massachusetts Cultural Council voted unanimously to make Natick Center one of the newest state-designated cultural districts, the tenth district to win this designation from the Commonwealth of Massachusetts. The Cultural Districts Initiative is designed to help communities attract artists and cultural enterprises, encourage business and job growth, expand tourism, preserve and reuse historic buildings, enhance property values, and foster local cultural development. Natick Center Cultural District is anchored by The Center for Arts in Natick, Morse Institute Library and the Natick Common.

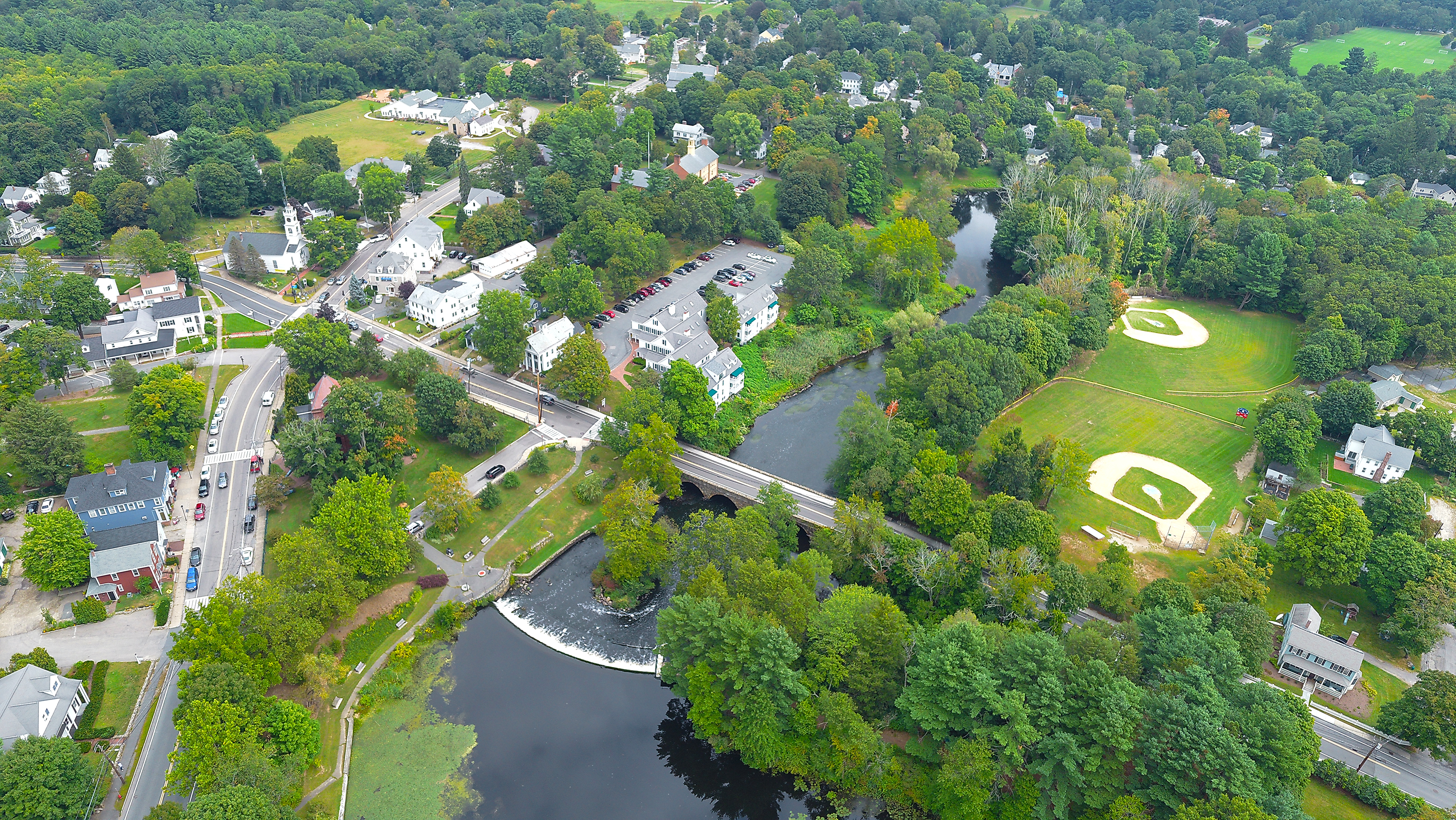
South Natick

=== South Natick ===
South Natick, known for its scenic nature, is where the Native American settlers first arrived and began the town on the shores of the Charles River. Housing developers like Martin Cerel lived in South Natick, and thus refrained from building major tract neighborhoods in this part of town.

Most South Natick residents consider themselves to have a strong, separate cultural identity from the rest of Natick. It is the only community in Natick that can be separately addressed officially via the US Postal Office, and street signage such as a sign along Route 16 coming from Wellesley communicates arrival in "So. Natick."

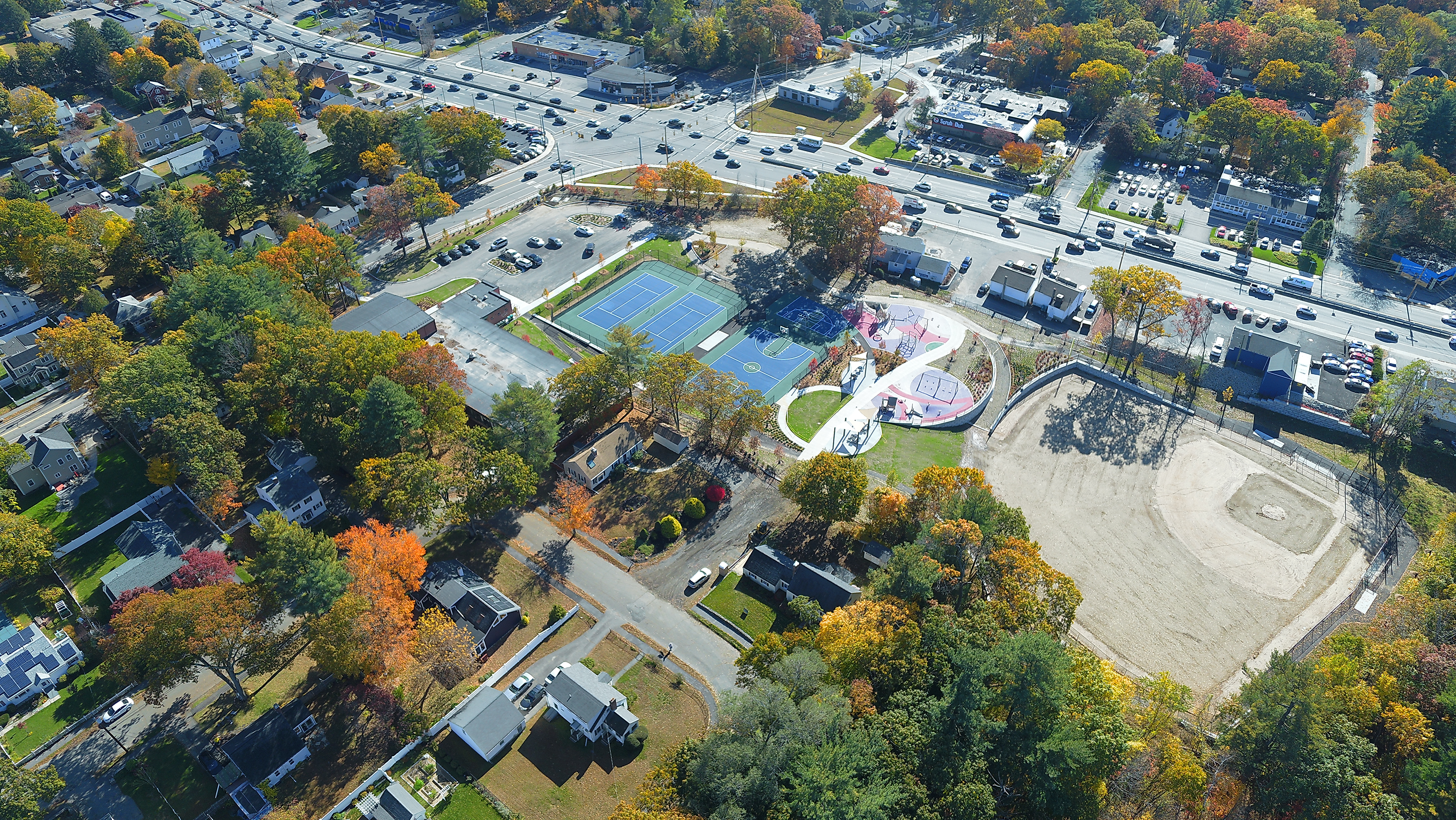
East Natick

=== East Natick ===
East Natick is a community of Natick along Oak Street and at the intersection of Oak Street and Worcester Street. Notable landmarks include Jennings Pond, the Cochituate Aqueduct Trail, the Industrial Park on Oak St North, and the Lilja School. Longfellow Health Club, which features a gym, pool, and tennis courts, is in East Natick off Oak St. in the Industrial Park. The stretch of Route 9 in East Natick as one heads into Wellesley contains a multitude of ever-changing retail businesses.

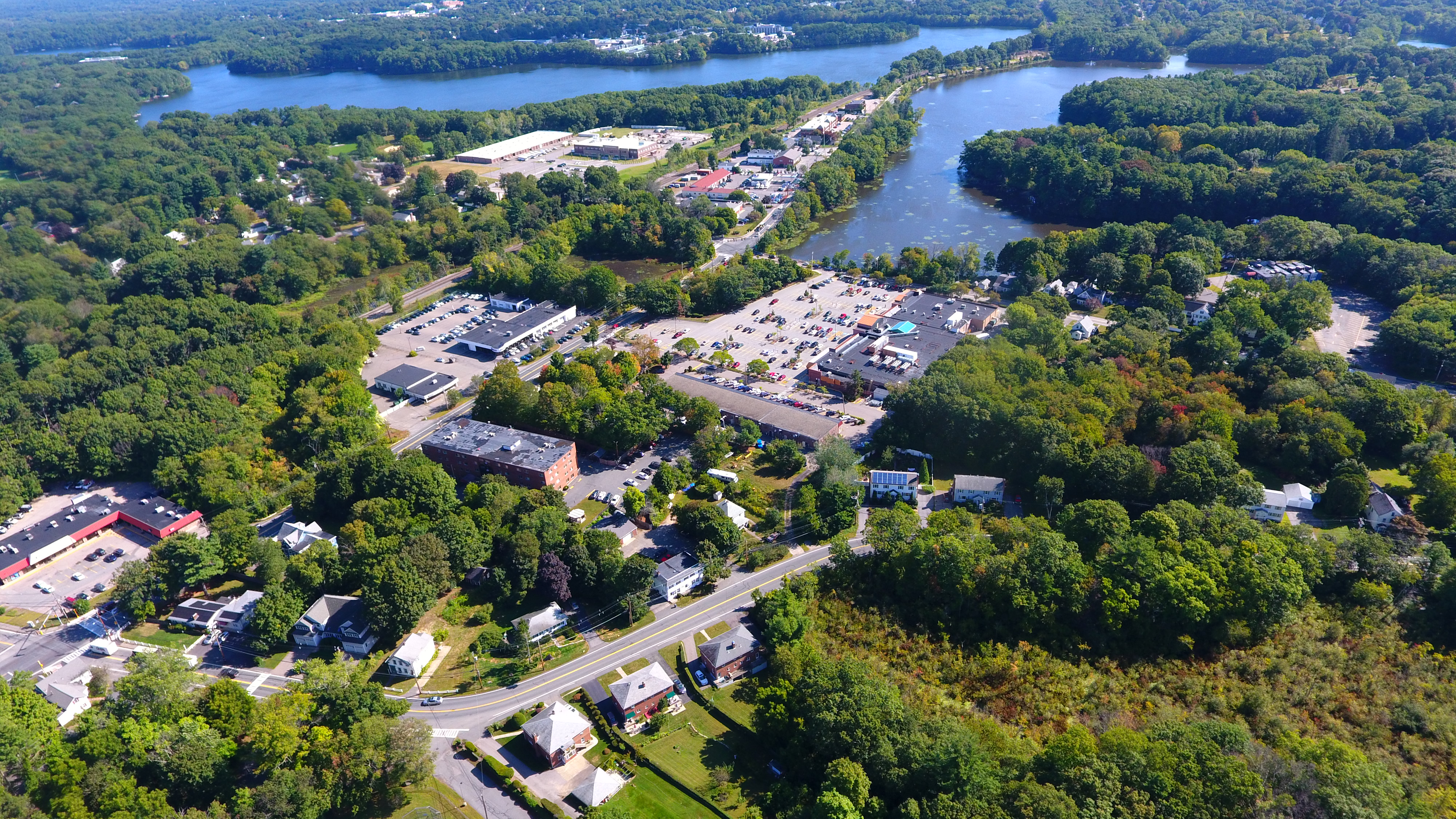
West Natick

=== West Natick ===
West Natick is a large section of Natick that borders the town of Framingham. The Natick Mall, as well as the strip mall called Sherwood Plaza with its office Industrial Park behind, are considered to be the commercial hub of West Natick. In addition to its retail development, post World War II housing developments like Westfield, Pelham, and Sherwood as well as the National Guard depot and a golf course on Speen St brought many people to this part of town.

There are many businesses in West Natick along West Central Street as well as another MBTA Commuter Rail station in addition to the one downtown. The area in West Natick, along Route 135 is the most densely populated section of town, with its thousands of condominiums and apartments clustered across the street from the train station.

=== Neighborhoods ===
Natick is a small town, and thus, the various sections of tract development homes are considered neighborhoods. These were houses built by several contractors in the late 1940s until the late 1950s. Listed here, are a few of these sections.

==== Sherwood ====
One of the earliest post World War II developments in West Natick, the homes are colonial in style, with street names reminiscent of the Robin Hood legend. The homes were built in 1948 and the neighborhood remains popular due to the fact that there's no through traffic, and most of the houses have been enlarged with additions.

==== Walnut Hill ====
Walnut Hill is a neighborhood north of downtown. It is known for the private boarding school Walnut Hill School for the Arts, as well as many Victorian era houses lining Walnut, Highland and Bacon Streets.

==== Wethersfield ====
The Wethersfield area of Natick is a residential neighborhood north of Route 9. It is a typical 1950s development of Campanelli ranch houses, and remains popular with first-time home buyers due to the relatively inexpensive slab-style houses. This area includes Drury Lane and all connecting roads within the boundaries of route 9, Pine Street, and Route 27.

==== Oak Street ====
South of Route 9, this section began as a summer vacation area, with tiny cottages surrounding Jennings Pond. Over the years, some houses were enlarged, but the area remains quaint and quiet with no thru traffic. On the westerly side of South Oak is a neighborhood of Cape style houses with streets named after World War II Generals. North of Route 9, other developments of small Cape-style homes were built in the early and mid-1950s and were popular with first-time home buyers due to their affordability. As is happening throughout the region, the capes are getting large additions or replaced by much larger homes. There are two Industrial Parks along north Oak St that contain office buildings on one side of the road and larger warehouses on the eastern side.

==== Little South ====
Just south of the Natick Common, Cottage Street begins what is commonly called Little South, named so because of its proximity to South Natick. Little South nomenclature extends to the east portions of Everett Street, down to Eliot St. Homes along Cottage St. were primarily built in the early 1950s and are mostly modest and well-maintained. The best-known landmarks in Little South are a WWII monument dedicated to the fallen soldiers from Natick, and The Tobin School, a private daycare and elementary school that has two large buildings off of Cottage St. Everett St. has larger farm homes situated on generous lots. Eliot St., which runs parallel to the Charles River, has some of Natick's oldest homes. Just before South Natick begins, there is a Virgin Mary statue on a large rock on the south side of the Charles River, enveloped by pine trees.

== Demographics ==
Historical population
Year	Pop.	±%
1790	615	—
1850	2,744	+346.2%
1860	5,515	+101.0%
1870	6,404	+16.1%
1880	8,112	+26.7%
1890	9,118	+12.4%
1900	9,488	+4.1%
1910	9,866	+4.0%
1920	10,907	+10.6%
1930	13,589	+24.6%
1940	13,851	+1.9%
1950	19,838	+43.2%
1960	17,993	−9.3%
1970	31,057	+72.6%
1980	29,461	−5.1%
1990	30,510	+3.6%
2000	31,868	+4.5%
2010	32,786	+2.9%
2020	37,006	+12.9%
2024*	37,316	+0.8%
* = population estimate.

As of the census of 2010, there were 32,786 people, 13,080 households, and 8,528 families residing in the town. The population density was 2,132.9 inhabitants per square mile (823.5/km^{2}). There were 13,368 housing units at an average density of 886.3 per square mile (342.2/km^{2}). The racial makeup of the town was 85.4% White, 2% African American, 0.1% Native American, 7.2% Asian, 0.0% Pacific Islander, 0.5% from other races and 2% from two or more races. Hispanic or Latino of any race were 3% of the population.

There were 13,080 households, out of which 30.3% had children under the age of 18 living with them, 54.5% were married couples living together, 8.2% had a female householder with no husband present, and 34.8% were non-families. Of all households, 28.3% were made up of individuals, and 9.8% had someone living alone who was 65 years of age or older. The average household size was 2.42 and the average family size was 3.02.

In the town, the population was spread out, with 23.0% under the age of 18, 5.1% from 18 to 24, 34.3% from 25 to 44, 23.3% from 45 to 64, and 14.3% who were 65 years of age or older. The median age was 38 years. For every 100 females, there were 89.7 males. For every 100 females age 18 and over, there were 85.3 males.

According to a 2007 estimate, the median income for a household in the town was $61,855, and the median income for a family was $85,056. Males had a median income of $51,964 versus $41,060 for females. The per capita income for the town was $36,358. About 1.7% of families and 2.8% of the population were below the poverty line, including 2.4% of those under age 18 and 5.3% of those age 65 or over.

Natick is surrounded, on three sides, by five of the eleven most affluent towns in Massachusetts with Wayland to the north, Weston to the northeast, Wellesley to the east, Dover to the southeast, and Sherborn to the southwest.

=== 2010 Census data ===
- The median age of Natick according to the 2010 US census was 41.1 years.
- There were 15,777 male citizens, accounting for 48.1% of the total population.
- There were 17,009 female citizens, accounting for 51.9% of the population.
- There were 25,233 White or Caucasian citizens, accounting for 82.2% of the population.
- There were 3,714 Asian citizens, accounting for 8.3% of the population.
- There were 2,282 Hispanic or Latino citizens, accounting for 5.0% of the population.
- There were 2,995 Black or African American citizens, accounting for 6.6% of the population.
- There were 135 Native American and Alaska Native citizens, accounting for 0.4% of the population.

== Economy ==
Companies based in Natick include Cognex Corporation, MathWorks, and Exponent.

== Government ==
=== Town ===
Natick has representative town meeting form of government (consisting of 180 members) with a Board of Selectmen and a Town Administrator. The members of the Board and the dates their terms end are (as of March 2023):

- Bruce T. Evans, Chair, 2025;
- Kathryn M. Coughlin, Vice Chair, 2025;
- Richard Sidney, Clerk, 2026;
- Kristen L. Pope, 2026;
- Paul R. Joseph, 2024.

The town is part of the Massachusetts Senate's Norfolk, Bristol and Middlesex district.

=== County ===
Mismanagement of Middlesex County's public hospital in the mid-1990s left the county on the brink of insolvency, and in 1997 the Massachusetts legislature stepped in by assuming all assets and obligations of the county. The government of Middlesex County was officially abolished on July 11, 1997. The sheriff and some other regional officials with specific duties are still elected locally to perform duties within the county region, but there is no county council or commissioner. Communities are now granted the right to form their own regional compacts for sharing services.

These are the remaining elected officers for Middlesex County:

- Clerk of Courts: Michael A. Sullivan
- County Treasurer: Position Eliminated
- District Attorney: Marian Ryan
- Register of Deeds: Richard P. Howe Jr. (North at Lowell), Maria C. Curtatone (South at Cambridge)
- Register of Probate: Tara E. DeCristofaro
- County Sheriff: Peter Koutoujian

== Education ==
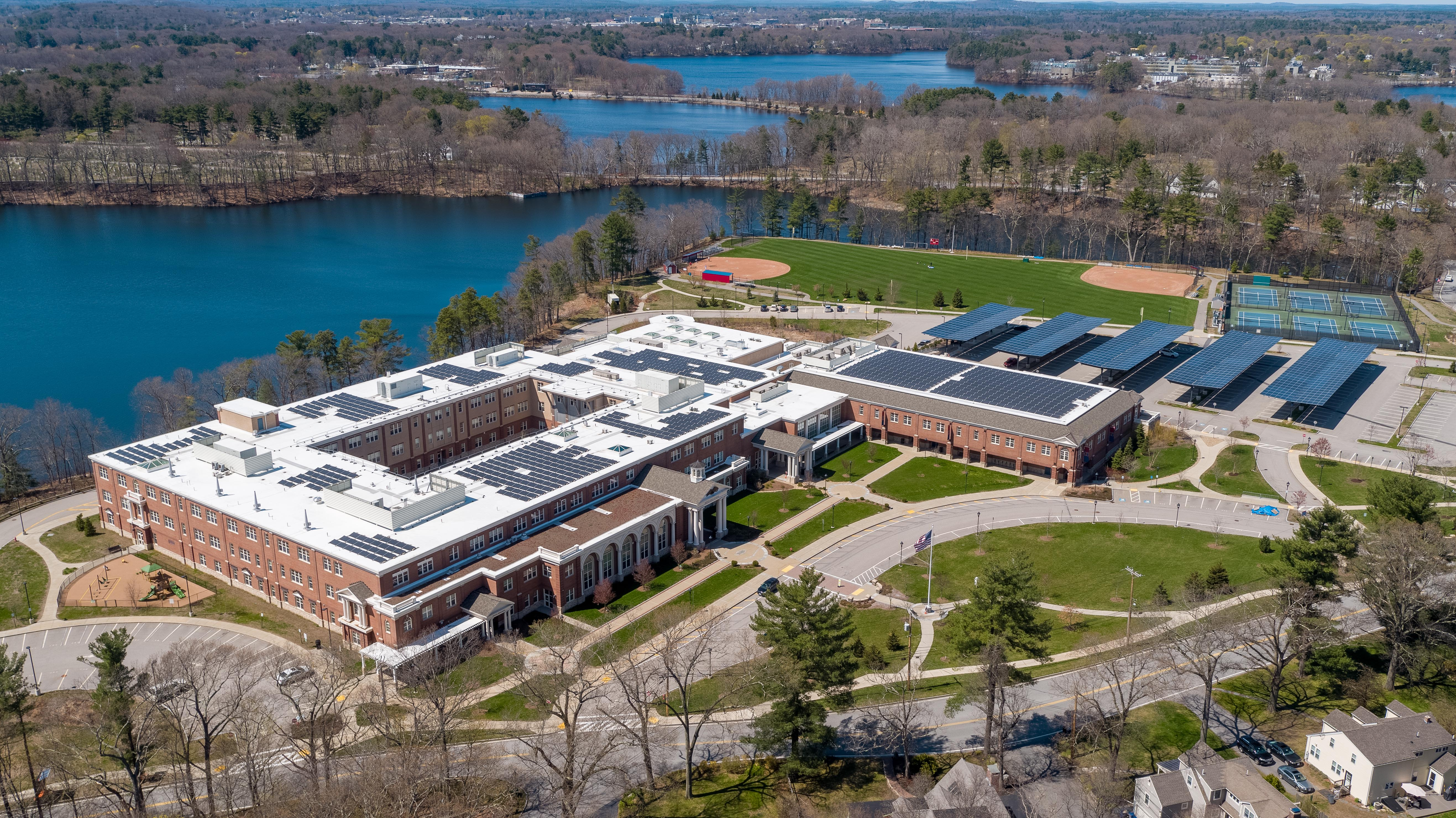
Natick High School

=== Public schools ===
The Natick Public School District operates the following schools:

- High school:
  - Natick High School; The High School building on the shore of Dug Pond, was opened in 2012. The new building design is based on a model approved by the state of Massachusetts. This was necessary in order to maximize state reimbursement for design and construction. It cost $80 million. The new high school is adjacent to the old high school and opened to students on August 29, 2012. Natick High's former school mascot name, the "Redmen", was changed in 2009 to the "Red and Blue", then in 2012 to the "Redhawks", also spelled "Red Hawks".
- Middle schools:
  - Kennedy Middle School, for which a replacement building broke ground on March 27, 2019;
  - Wilson Middle School.
- Elementary schools:
  - Brown Elementary School;
  - Lilja Elementary School;
  - Memorial Elementary School;
  - Bennett-Hemenway (Ben-Hem) Elementary School;
  - Johnson Elementary School; (shut down 2024)

=== Private schools ===
- Walnut Hill School for the Arts
- Riverbend School (formerly Eliot Montessori School and Natick Montessori), a Montessori school for preK through 8th grade
- The Tobin School
- Brandon School and Residential Treatment Center, a school within a residential treatment center
- Saint Benedict Classical Academy (formerly Saint Benedict Elementary), located in the Harriet Beecher Stowe House

== Transportation ==
Natick is served by two stops on the MBTA Commuter Rail Framingham/Worcester Line; Natick Center station in the downtown area, and West Natick station, located off West Central Street (MA-135).

Bus service is provided in Natick by the MetroWest Regional Transit Authority.

== Notable people ==
- Horatio Alger Jr., minister, author of children's books with a rags to riches theme, settled in Natick in 1860 and built his family home in South Natick
- Thomas S. Allen, composer
- Thelma Babbitt, Quaker activist for peace, environmental causes
- James Bamford, author, journalist who writes about the world of US intelligence agencies
- John Carlson, NHL player for the Anaheim Ducks
- Eddie Casey, former American football player and coach
- Joseph M. Connolly, American police detective and politician
- Rich Costello, retired American professional ice hockey player
- David Cullen, Artist in Residence at Elizabethtown College and Grammy Award-winning guitarist
- William Finn, Tony-winning composer and lyricist of musicals including Falsettos and The 25th Annual Putnam County Spelling Bee
- Katrín Davíðsdóttir, CrossFit athlete
- Paul Dellegatto, long time chief meteorologist at FOX 13 in Tampa. His dog "Brody" became a viral sensation during Covid
- William F. Donovan, track coach at Harvard
- Totie Fields, Comedian
- Keene Fitzpatrick, track coach at Yale, Michigan and Princeton, 1890–1932
- Darren Flutie, CFL and NFL veteran who attended Natick High School before going to Boston College; 2nd all-time in receptions in the CFL; CFL Hall of Famer
- Doug Flutie, NFL and CFL veteran who attended high school in Natick, before going to Boston College; retired from the New England Patriots after the 2005–2006 season; resides in Natick, 50th Heisman Trophy winner; also played for many other NFL teams, including the Buffalo Bills
- Anjali Forber-Pratt, wheelchair racer and Paralympian
- Alison Fraser, Broadway performer and two-time Tony Award nominee grew up in Natick; graduated from Natick High School
- Alan Gordon, songwriter who wrote "Happy Together" by the Turtles
- Alfred S. Hartwell (1836–1912), commanded the 55th Massachusetts Infantry Regiment, sister regiment of the 54th Massachusetts Infantry, during the Civil War. Led Union troops into Charleston, South Carolina when it fell and worked for the Freedman's Bureau. Moved to the Kingdom of Hawaii in 1868 and was appointed Chief Justice of the Hawaiian Supreme Court
- Tommy Heinsohn, former basketball player for the Boston Celtics and member of the Naismith Memorial Basketball Hall of Fame
- Walt Hriniak, Major League Baseball player and batting coach
- Harold Kushner, rabbi and author of many books, known for When Bad Things Happen to Good People
- Harvey Leonard, chief meteorologist for WCVB-TV
- Dan LaCouture, grew up and went to school in Natick and played hockey for BU. Drafted into the NHL 1996; played for the Edmonton Oilers, Pittsburgh Penguins, New York Rangers, Boston Bruins, New Jersey Devils, Carolina Hurricanes
- Dottie Green, female catcher who played from 1943 through 1947 in the All-American Girls Professional Baseball League
- Al Kaprielian, is a weather presenter in New Hampshire.
- Eddie Mahan, American football player
- Meg Mallon, professional golfer on the LPGA Tour and twice winner of the US Women's Open
- Stephen Maranian, is a retired major general who served in the United States Army of Armenian descent
- Joe McGlone, American football player
- John McNamara (baseball), former manager of the Boston Red Sox
- Mike Murphy (trainer and coach), trainer and coach at Yale
- Don Nardo, historian, composer, and writer
- William Nutt, moved to Natick in 1856, went to Kansas to oppose pro-slave forces there in 1858 and was an organizer of the Natick Shoe Strike in 1860. Served with the 55th Massachusetts Infantry during the Civil War and rose to the rank of Colonel
- John O'Hurley, actor best known for role as J. Peterman on Seinfeld
- Al Parker, gay porn actor, producer, and director
- Rob Patterson, former guitarist for Otep, touring guitarist for Korn, currently guitarist for Filter (band) and once engaged to Carmen Electra
- Rene Rancourt, professional singer, sang the national anthem at all home Boston Bruins hockey games
- Jonathan Richman, proto-punk rock icon and founder of The Modern Lovers
- Jim Riley, graduated from Natick High School and went on to become drummer and band leader for the award-winning country band Rascal Flatts
- John Sassamon, English-speaking praying Indian who assisted John Eliot (missionary) as interpreter
- Phil Schiller, senior vice president of worldwide marketing at Apple Inc
- Pete Smith, pitcher for Seattle Rainers and Boston Red Sox in 1961
- Joe Sostilio, racing driver
- Harriet Beecher Stowe (June 14, 1811 – July 1, 1896), author and abolitionist, whose novel Uncle Tom's Cabin (1852) attacked the cruelty of slavery and received worldwide acclaim. Her novel "Old Town Folks" was written while she was living in Natick and tells the story of her husband's family
- Donald Suxho, Olympic volleyball player
- Don Terry (1902–1988), film actor
- Alexander Wheelock Thayer, US consul at Trieste in 1859 and author of a biography of Ludwig van Beethoven published in 1866
- Ming Tsai, American restaurateur, television personality, and celebrity chef
- Frank Varrichione (born 1932), college All-American and five-time Pro Bowl professional football player
- Waban, 17th-century tribal chief
- Sara Whalen (born 1976), Olympic soccer silver medalist
- Sarita White, contestant on reality show "Survivor: Redemption Island"
- Fred Willis, former NFL player
- Henry Wilson, the 18th Vice President of the United States, lived at 33 West Central Street and worked as a shoemaker at his shoe shop at 181 West Central Street
- Ida E. Woods (1870–1940), astronomer, born and died in Natick
- Susan Wornick, former American television journalist and current TV host and spokesperson

== Points of interest ==
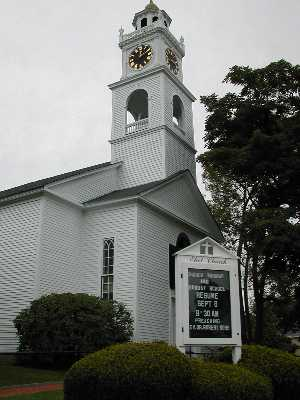
Eliot Church in South Natick, Mass.

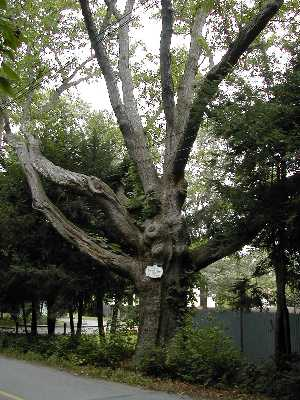
Natick Station Tree

- The U.S. Army Soldier Systems Center (SSC) (Also known as The Natick Army Labs), a complex of military R&D facilities, produces military-use items such as field rations, personal protective field equipment, and specialized uniforms.
- Natick Mall is the largest shopping center in New England. First opened in 1966, it was replaced by the current building in 1994. A major renovation took place in 2007.
- Cognex Corporation corporate headquarters.
- MathWorks corporate headquarters, which is split into two campuses, Lakeside and Apple Hill. The Lakeside campus was formerly the site of Boston Scientific headquarters and of mini-computer manufacturer Prime Computer. Before Prime, Carling ran a Black Label brewery there.
- The Walnut Hill School is a private secondary school, offering particular emphasis in the studio and performing arts. Walnut Hill graduates more students to the Juilliard School than any other secondary school in the world.
- The Center for Arts in Natick (TCAN), located in Natick's historic Central Fire Station, is a performance venue for musicians in jazz, folk, classical, and rock genres. TCAN also hosts theatrical productions by the TCAN Players and children's classes in theatre and dance. A cinema on the restored second floor shows new releases and classic films. Artists performing at TCAN have included Judy Collins, Don McLean, George Winston, Paula Poundstone, Shawn Colvin, Marshall Crenshaw, Jimmy Webb, Karla Bonoff, John Sebastian and Adrian Belew.

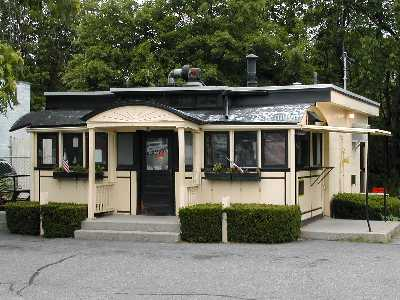
Casey's Diner

- Casey's Diner, constructed in 1922, is one of the oldest operating ten-stool diners in the United States. Casey's Diner is diminutive in size at only 10 feet (3.0 m) by 20-1/2 feet, and was constructed by the Worcester Lunch Car Company in Worcester, Massachusetts. Famous for its steamed hot dogs, Casey's originated as a horse-drawn lunch wagon that was parked on Natick Common.
- Henry Wilson Shoe Shop, 181 West Central Street, listed on the National Register of Historic Places
- The Chabad Center of Natick is a synagogue and Jewish educational center in West Natick which is dedicated to strengthening Jewish awareness in the Metrowest area. The Hebrew School for the Arts is a breakthrough in typical Hebrew school education. Located at the Chabad Center, Hebrew School for the Arts teaches traditional Judaism while integrating the modern arts of drama.
- The Morse Institute Library, located in Downtown Natick, is a public library which serves as a major educational resource as well as providing programs and hands-on learning opportunities for all residents of Natick and the Metrowest area.
- The Natick Historical Society, located in the lower level of the Bacon Free Library. Archives and exhibits on John Eliot and Praying Indians, natural history collections, life during colonial times, early republic and industrial revolution, memorabilia of famous Natick citizens.
- The Boden Lane Cemetery is a very small burial site established in 1815. Although the cemetery was established in that year, many of the gravestones are dated even earlier than this date, with some dating back to the Revolutionary War. The cemetery is located on Boden Lane, to the right of Beaver Dam, and directly across the street from the Chabad Center of Natick.

== In popular culture ==
Natick was the setting for Harriet Beecher-Stowe's 1869 fictional novel Oldtown Folks. The novel is based on her husband's childhood in Natick, and it accurately details town landmarks, ministers, and inhabitants despite renaming the location to Oldtown. Beecher-Stowe is best known for writing abolitionist fiction novel Uncle Tom's Cabin.

Natick's very own Stop & Shop inspired lyrics for the 1976 song "Roadrunner", written by Jonathan Richman and performed by The Modern Lovers.

Natick appears on the Family Guy episode "Da Boom" when the family sets out to the town after Peter reveals that there is a Twinkie factory there. Natick did contain a Hostess factory until 2007 when the Natick Mall expanded into the collection. He eventually starts a town on the ruins of the community, renaming it New Quahog.

To solvers of crossword puzzles such as those of The New York Times and the Los Angeles Times, "natick" (as coined by Rex Parker) refers to any square a solver cannot fill in correctly without guessing because the solver does not know either entry that passes through it (and there are at least two letters that are reasonable guesses). Such entries are generally proper nouns.

Scenes included in the 2013 American drama film Labor Day (film) starring Kate Winslet, Josh Brolin and Tobey Maguire were filmed in Natick, at locations including The Center for Arts in Natick and Park Street Ice Cream.

Natick appears in the 2015 video game Fallout 4, which is set in the greater Boston area (referred to in the game as The Commonwealth).

Part of South Natick made an appearance in the Oscar-nominated movie Knives Out. While filming on location, the project had the code name "Morning Bell". Other scenes were shot in surrounding towns such as Wellesley, Framingham, and Waltham.

In April 2019 Chris Evans was in Natick filming an upcoming TV series, Defending Jacob. The production was seen filming on the Natick Common, Park Street, and at Park Street Ice Cream. The ice cream shop was temporarily converted into "K.D. Scoops" for the filming. Many Natick residents crowded around in hopes of getting a glimpse of Evans. Photos were taken of him and his co-star sitting on a bench on the commons as well as inside and outside Park Street Ice Cream. Defending Jacob released on Apple TV+ on April 24, 2020.

The characters in the 2021 visual novel Emily is Away <3 by Kyle Seeley live in Natick and attend Natick High School.

== See also ==
- Golden Triangle
- Greater Boston
- MetroWest
- Representative town meeting
