= Emily Is Away =

2015 indie visual novel game

- Designer: Kyle Seeley
- Writer: Kyle Seeley
- Series: Emily Is Away
- Engine: Unity
- Platforms: Windows, Mac OS X, Linux
- Release: 20 November 2015
- Genres: Visual novel, Romance
- Mode: Single-player

Emily Is Away (Note: Stylized as Emily is Away and emily is away) is an indie visual novel by game developer Kyle Seeley, released for free in November 2015. Set in the early-to-mid 2000s, Emily Is Away tells the story of the protagonist's relationship with a girl, Emily, over the course of five years, from the senior year of high school to the senior year of college. The game is presented through a chat client on Windows XP styled after ICQ and AOL Instant Messenger, specifically their builds in the early-to-mid 2000s, complete with other users' profiles and interface. The choices for profile pictures are generally collected from the culture of the early-to-mid 2000s, including 28 Days Later, The Ring, Harry Potter, The Lord of the Rings, blink-182, Red Hot Chili Peppers, Eminem, and Avril Lavigne on the first level. Through special usernames, players can unlock more profile icons referencing early-to-mid 2010s culture, like The Binding of Isaac, Markiplier, Jacksepticeye, Portal, and The Stanley Parable.

== Plot ==
Gameplay screenshot.

Throughout the course of the game the player is given the option of changing avatars in tandem with whatever was popular at the time. Their friends also show progression by choosing new icons, biographies, and away messages.

In the protagonist's senior year of high school in 2002, they use a chat client to talk with "emilyluv", "emerly", or Emily. They discuss high school and a fellow student, Brad, who keeps sending Emily messages. They also talk about a party that a classmate Travis is throwing that evening, which they may or may not go to, depending on player choices. Then they say goodbye as Emily logs off.

In their first year of college (2003), the player talks to Emily again, who has gotten together with Brad or Travis (depending on if the player chose to go to the party or not), though she hints that the relationship has become rocky. The character congratulates her, and shifts to other questions, such as their classes. They say goodbye, as Emily yet again logs off.

In their second year of college (2004), the player learns that Emily has broken up with Brad/Travis, explained by Emily as "growing apart", and the character is given the option of consoling her. At this point, Emily either asks why they did not come to Travis's party in 2002 or why they did not kiss her if they did attend, depending on the player choices. They both wonder what could have been, and Emily immediately asks if she can come to visit. Most of the time, they will agree for Emily to come, and the player will subsequently cancel their plans with Emma, a friend of the player. The player, alternatively can choose to not allow Emily to come. Emily signs off.

In their third year of college (2005), the player again talks to Emily, who wants to talk things over about her previous visit. If the character does not set boundaries and Emily visits, it turns out that Emily and the character ended up hooking up, and Emily feels like she was taken advantage of when she was vulnerable. If the character does set boundaries and they do not hook up, Emily asks if the character had feelings for her when she visited and why they did not make a move. Alternatively, if the player chooses to not let Emily visit, she will ask the player character about their new friends. The conversation is awkward and distant, with Emily eventually leaving due to her discomfort, feeling too weird to continue.

In their final year of college (2006), Emily and the character have clearly grown apart. Emily comments how her life is better now; she started dating Brad/Travis again and is involved in other things. The player themselves have lost their friend Emma, in some cases because of Emily. As the conversation comes to an uncomfortable and cold finish, the character begins to revise sentences asking if the two will ever be the same – deleting earnest questions and asking about the weather or other mundane affairs instead. Despite the protagonist's obvious feelings for Emily, she obviously no longer cares, and as a result, they say goodbye. For the first time, the player character is the one who leaves the conversation, logging off.

Alternatively, if the player chooses not to talk things over in 2005, Emily will refuse to talk at all in 2006, stating she is too busy.

== Reception ==
Emily Is Away was met with mostly positive reviews, receiving an average score of "Very Positive" on its Steam page. Reviewers noted it for its gameplay, characters and price, but noted that it was short. Wired praised its gameplay and characters, calling it "one of those rare games that completely stopped me in my tracks." Rock, Paper, Shotgun said it was "good fun, for the nostalgia factor if nothing else."

== Sequels ==
=== Emily Is Away Too ===
A sequel known as Emily Is Away Too (Note: Stylized as Emily is Away Too and emily is away too) was released on 26 May 2017. The sequel was first revealed in October 2016 when Kyle Seeley uploaded a teaser trailer for the sequel on his YouTube channel. The game's website was also updated to Emily Is Away Too. The sequel allows players to chat with two people simultaneously and the game includes parodies of popular sites in 2006 such as YouTube and Newgrounds. The game also allows players to customize their profile and choose their story.

=== Emily Is Away <3 ===
Another sequel, Emily Is Away <3, (Note: Stylized as Emily is Away <3 and emily is away <3) was released on 16 April 2021. It is the spiritual successor to the 2017 video game Emily Is Away Too. The game is primarily set in Facenook, a parody of Facebook in the year 2008.
