= Baseball (ball) =

Ball used in the sport of baseball

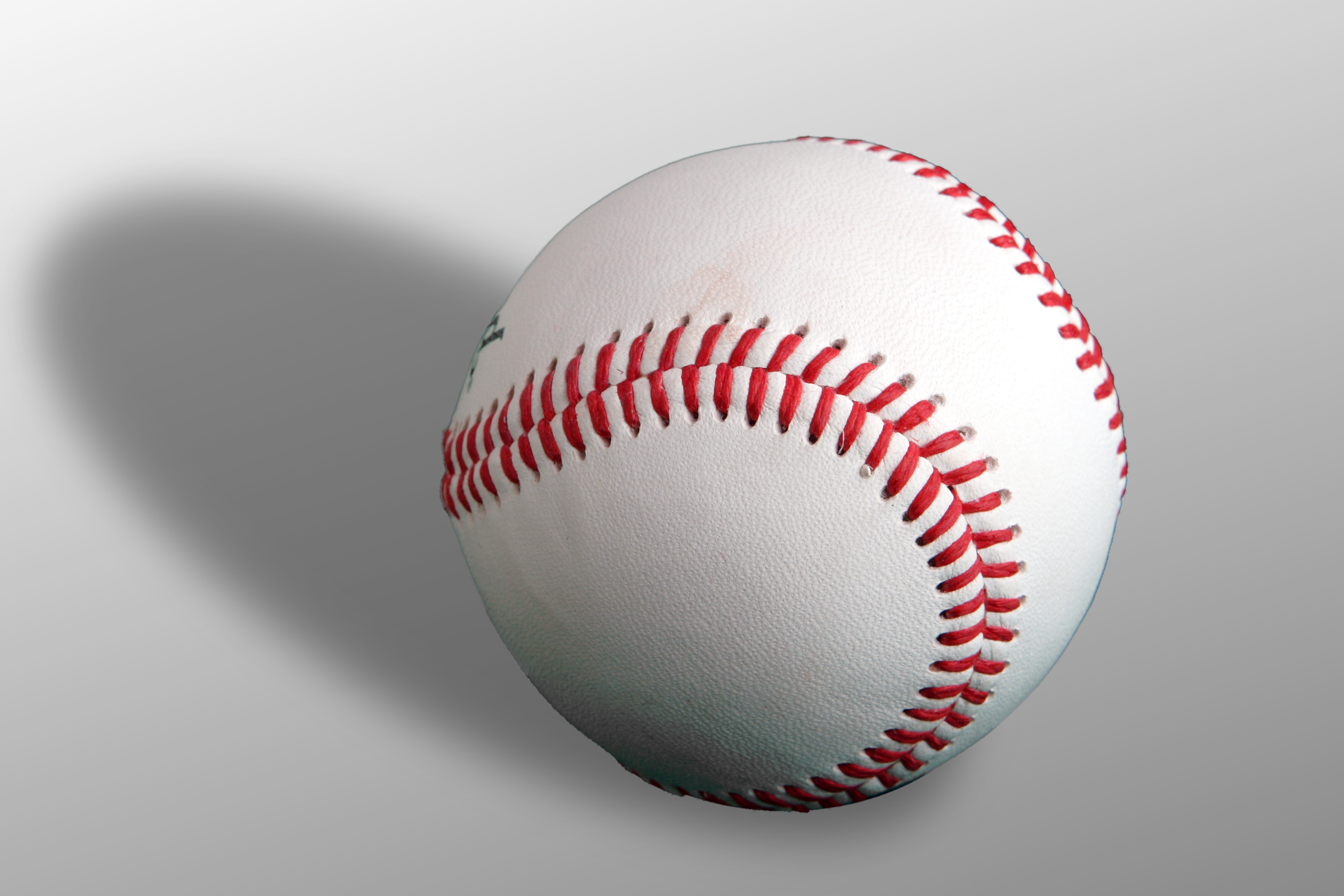
A typical baseball

A baseball is the ball used in the sport of baseball. It consists of a rubber or cork center wrapped in yarn and covered with white natural horsehide or cowhide, or a synthetic composite leather. A regulation baseball is 9 to 9.25 inches (229 to 235 mm) in circumference i.e. 2.86 to 2.94 inches (73 to 75 mm) in diameter, with a weight of 5 to 5.25 ounces (0.142 to 0.149 kg).

The leather cover is commonly formed from two saddle-shaped pieces stitched together, typically with red-dyed thread. There are 108 stitches on a regulation baseball. That stitching plays a significant role in the trajectory of a thrown baseball due to the drag caused by the interaction between the stitching and the air. Controlling the orientation of the stitches and the speed of the ball's rotation allows a pitcher to affect the behavior of the pitched ball in specific ways. Commonly thrown pitches include the curveball, slider, two-seam and four-seam fastballs, sinker, cutter, and changeup.

== History ==
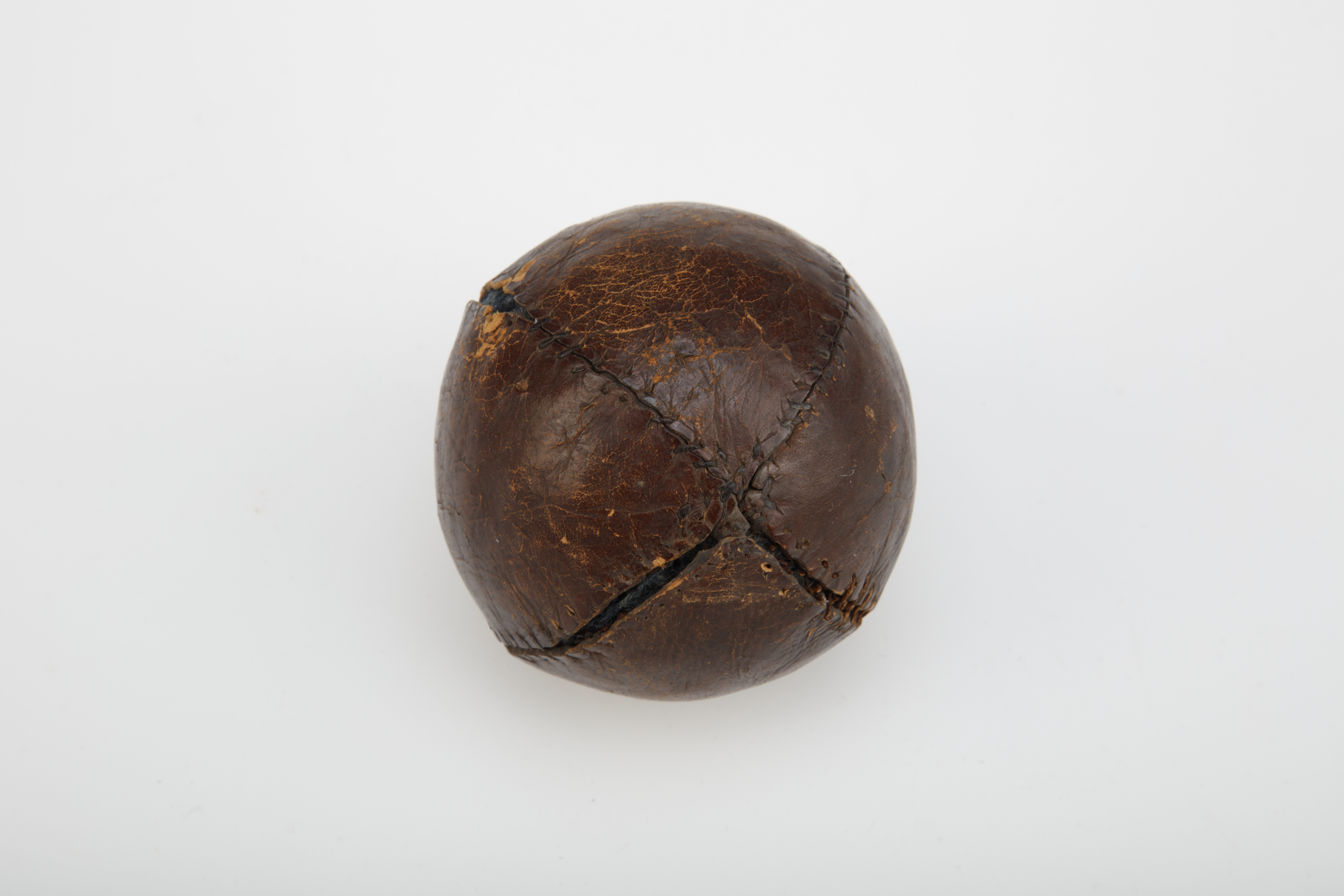
Early lemon peel baseball

In the early days of baseball in the mid-19th century, there was a great variety in the size, shape, weight, and manufacturing of baseballs. Early baseballs were made with a rubber core from old, melted shoes, wrapped in yarn and leather. Pitchers usually made their own balls, which were used throughout the game, softening and coming unraveled as the game went on. One of the more popular earlier ball designs was the "lemon peel ball," named after its distinct four lines of stitching design. Lemon peel balls were darker, smaller, and weighed less than other baseballs, prompting them to travel further and bounce higher, causing very high-scoring games.

In the mid-1850s, teams in and around New York met in an attempt to standardize the baseball. They decided to regulate the weight of baseballs at 5 1/2–6 oz, and with a circumference of 8–11 inches. There were still many variations of baseballs since they were completely handmade. Balls with more rubber and a tighter winding went further and faster (known as "live balls"), and balls with less rubber and a looser winding (known as "dead balls") did not travel as far or fast. This is generally true for all baseballs. Teams often used this knowledge to their advantage, as players from the team usually manufactured their own baseballs to use in games.

There is no agreement on who invented the commonplace figure-8 stitching on baseballs. Some historians say it was invented by Ellis Drake, a shoemaker's son, to make the cover stronger and more durable. Others say it was invented by Colonel William A. Cutler and sold to William Harwood in 1858. Harwood built the nation's first baseball factory in Natick, Massachusetts, and was the first to popularize and mass-produce baseballs with the figure-8 design.

In 1876, the National League (NL) was created, and standard rules and regulations were put in place. Albert Spalding, a well-known baseball pitcher who made his own balls, convinced the NL to adopt his ball as the official baseball for the NL. It remained that way for a century.

In 1910, the cork-core ball was introduced. They outlasted rubber core baseballs; for the first few years they were used, balls were hit further and faster than rubber core balls. Pitchers adapted with the use of the spitball, which is now illegal, and an emphasis on changing the ball.

In 1920, a couple of important changes were made to baseballs. They began to be made using machine winders and a higher grade of yarn from Australia. Offensive statistics rose immediately, and players and fans alike believed the new balls helped batters hit the ball farther.

In 1925, Milton Reach patented his "cushion cork" center. It was a cork core surrounded by black rubber, then another layer of red rubber.

In 1934, the National League and American League came to a compromise and standardized the baseball. They agreed on a cushion cork center; two wrappings of yarn; a special rubber cement coating; two more wrappings of yarn; and, finally, a horsehide cover.

Baseballs have gone through only a few small changes since the compromise. During World War II, the United States banned the use of rubber for non war-related goods, including for baseballs. So in 1943, instead of using rubber, baseballs were made with rubber-like shells of balata (also once used in golf balls), which is obtained from a tropical tree. Hitting declined significantly that year.

The introduction of synthetic rubber in 1944 resulted in baseballs returning to normal. Offense would return to normal after the return of players from the military and change back to the regular ball.

In 1974, due to a shortage of horsehide, cowhide replaced the big league ball's cover material.

In 1976, MLB ended its relationship with Spalding for manufacturing their baseballs and switched to Rawlings, which still provides the balls to MLB today.

A significant increase in the number of home runs since the start of the 2016 baseball season caused MLB officials to establish a committee that would examine the manufacturing process. In December 2019, MLB officials said that a lower stitching seam profile had most likely led to the increase in home runs, but also pledged to consider studying the issue. On February 5, 2021, MLB issued a memo that said that Rawlings had altered their manufacturing process to reduce the bounce in the balls and that after extensive testing, "... we are comfortable that these baseballs meet all of our performance specifications." The same memo also noted that more teams had applied for permission to use humidors to store their baseballs. As of 2020 only the Arizona Diamondbacks, Boston Red Sox, Colorado Rockies, and Seattle Mariners, were using the devices.

== Overview ==
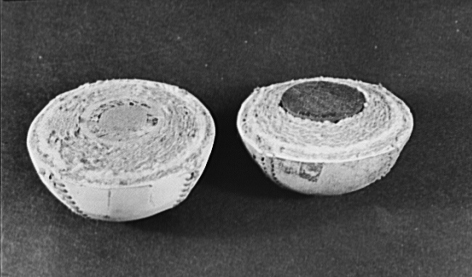
Halves of two baseballs; traditional cork-centered (left) and rubber-centered

Cushioned wood cores were patented in the late 19th century by sports equipment manufacturer Spalding, the company founded by former baseball star A.G. Spalding. In recent years, various synthetic materials have been used to create baseballs; however, they are generally considered lower quality, stitched with two red thick thread, and are not used in the major leagues. Using different types of materials affects the performance of the baseball. Generally a tighter-wound baseball will leave the bat faster, and fly further. Since the baseballs used today are wound tighter than in previous years, notably the dead-ball era that prevailed through 1920, people often say the ball is "juiced". The height of the seams also affects how well a pitcher can pitch.

Baseballs used in MLB and the top minor leagues (AAA) are made to the same specifications, but labelled separately. Balls used in the lower minor leagues (up to AA) use slightly different specifications intended to make those balls somewhat more durable, although MLB pitchers on rehab assignments in the minors are usually supplied with major league-grade balls. Generally, in Little League through college leagues, the seams are markedly higher than balls used in professional leagues.

In 1901, the Spalding and Reach companies manufactured the official baseballs for the National and American Leagues, respectively, at a listed unit price of $1.25 each, equivalent to $48 in 2025. By comparison, the same source lists top-quality baseball bats at a mere $0.75. Due to the high relative cost of ball production, club owners in the early 20th century were reluctant to spend much money on new balls if not necessary. It was not unusual for a single baseball to last an entire game, nor for a baseball to be reused for the next game especially if it was still in relatively good condition as would likely be the case for a ball introduced late in the game. Balls hit into the stands were retrieved by team employees in order to be put back in play, as is still done today in some other sports. Over the course of a game, a typical ball would become discolored due to dirt, and often tobacco juice and other materials applied by players; damage would also occur, causing slight rips and seam bursts. This would lower the offense during the games giving pitchers an advantage. However, after the 1920 death of batter Ray Chapman after being hit in the head by a pitch, perhaps due to his difficulty in seeing the ball during twilight, an effort was made to replace dirty or worn baseballs. However, even though scores of new balls are used nowadays in every game, some rules intended solely to reduce the frequency (and associated expense) of replacing balls during a game remain in force - the Pine Tar Incident in the 1980s was one famous incident triggered by a capricious enforcement of an obscure one.

Today, MLB teams are required to have a minimum of 156 baseballs ready for use in each game. When combined with baseballs needed for practice, etc. each MLB team uses tens of thousands of balls every season. However, modern professional-grade baseballs purchased in bulk only cost about seven dollars each (as of 2026) and thus make up a negligible portion of a modern MLB team's operating budget. Recreational-grade baseballs can be purchased by the public for an even lower unit price.

Once discarded by the umpire, game-used baseballs not hit into the stands are collected by batboys. Many baseballs involved in historical plays are displayed at the National Baseball Hall of Fame and Museum in Cooperstown, New York. Other baseballs associated with noteworthy in-game events are often authenticated and sold as memorabilia. Most such sales today are conducted on MLB's official website. The total proceeds from such sales represent a significant portion of the total purchase cost of baseballs since even balls used for relatively minor accomplishments can each fetch hundreds or thousands of dollars.

In 1909, sports magnate and former player Alfred J. Reach patented the ivory centered "ivory nut" in Panama and suggested it might be even better in a baseball than cork. However, Philadelphia Athletics president Benjamin F. Shibe, who had invented and patented the cork centered ball, commented, "I look for the leagues to adopt an 'ivory nut' baseball just as soon as they adopt a ferro-concrete bat and a base studded with steel spikes." Both leagues adopted Shibe's cork-centered ball in 1910.

The official major league ball is made by Rawlings, which produces the stitched balls in Costa Rica. Attempts to automate the manufacturing process were never entirely successful, leading to the continued use of hand-made balls. The raw materials are imported from the United States, assembled into baseballs and shipped back.

Throughout the 20th Century, Major League Baseball used two technically identical but differently marked balls. The American League had "Official American League" and the American League's president's signature in blue ink, while National League baseballs had "Official National League" and the National League president's signature in black ink. Bob Feller stated that when he was a rookie in the 1930s, National League baseball laces were black, intertwined with red; American League baseball laces were blue and red. In 2000, Major League Baseball reorganized its structure to eliminate the position of league presidents, and switched to one ball specification for both leagues. Under the current rules, a major league baseball weighs between 5 and 5 1/4 ounces (142 and 149 g), and is 9 to 9 1/4 inches (229–235 mm) in circumference (2 7/8–3 in or 73–76 mm in diameter). There are 108 double stitches on a baseball, or 216 individual stitches.

The Nippon Professional Baseball uses a ball that is slightly smaller (8.875–9.125 inches (22.54–23.18 cm)) than its MLB and WBSC equivalents (9–9.25 inches (22.9–23.5 cm)).

While the decision whether to discard a baseball is formally at the discretion of the home plate umpire, today baseballs are expected to be immediately replaced after even minor scratches, discoloration and undesirable texture that can occur during the game. Balls used for pre-game warm-ups are often given to fans. Because baseballs are almost always replaced after each half-inning it is increasingly customary for players to give balls used to end half-innings to fans in the front rows, either by handing the ball to a fan (especially a child) in the front row or by gently tossing it into the stands, especially if the player holding it is a home team player close to the stands as for example is often the case for an outfielder catching a fly ball. MLB has long recognized any ball that comes into the possession of a spectator by any lawful means after entering the stands as immediately becoming the property of that spectator, although balls hit out of the park for momentous occasions (record setting, or for personal reasons) are often requested to be returned by the fan who catches or otherwise retrieves it, or donated freely by the fan. Usually, the player will give the fan an autographed bat and/or other autographed items in exchange for the special ball.

Without proper preparation, an official professional-grade baseball is very dangerous to throw because it is so slick and hard. By rule, balls used in the professional game must be rubbed with a mud known as "rubbing mud", which is typically applied either by the umpires or someone working under their supervision before each game, and is intended to help the pitcher's grip. Because the mud discolors the ball, many fans prefer to purchase non-game-used balls for purposes such as collecting autographs, etc. In contrast, recreational-grade baseballs are designed so as not to require any special preparation before being used.

Three common forms of baseball exist: the standard leather-covered ball used in ubiquitously in the sport; a rubber version used in Japan for children's baseball; and a softer yet "practice" ball mainly used indoors:

- Baseball or Hard baseball – Ordinary baseball which is used in Major League Baseball, in Japan is used in high school baseball and above for (hardball) baseball, referred to as hardball or baseball
- Rubber baseball aka Nanshiki – Used for rubberball baseball usually played prior to high school in Japan; sometimes referred to as Japanese rubber baseball
- Soft (compression) baseball – Used for batting practice and fielding training or softball baseball which can be safely played indoors, usually made from polyurethane (PU) material
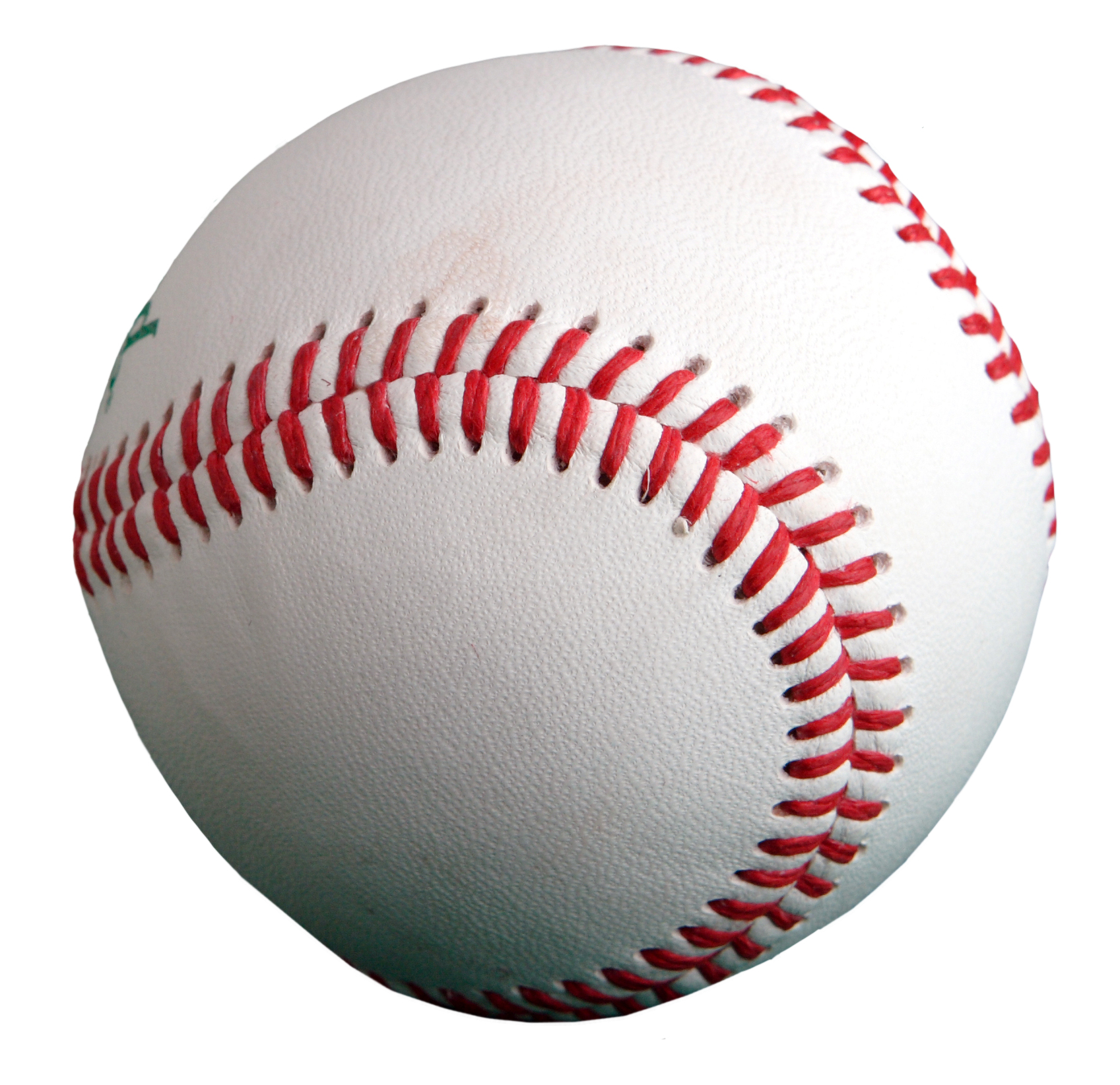
Ordinary baseball

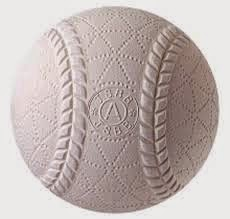
Rubber baseball

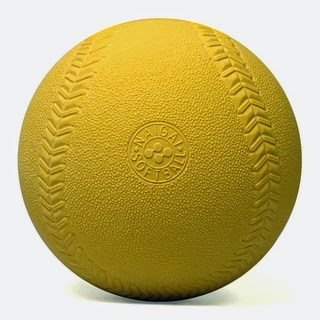
Soft (compression) baseball

== Famous baseballs ==
Fans catching baseballs tied to MLB milestones has been a part of the game since fences became a part of it, increasingly being kept (and increasingly valuable) over time:

- The ball that Mark McGwire hit for his 70th home run of the 1998 baseball season, then setting a new record, was sold by a fan to Todd McFarlane for US$3.2 million at auction.
- Larry Ellison, not to be confused with the software entrepreneur of the same name, famously retrieved both Barry Bonds' 660th and 661st home runs.
- Barry Bonds' 73rd home run of the 2001 season. It was the last home run of his historic, record breaking season where he broke Mark McGwire's single season home run record. Ownership of the ball generated controversy and litigation resulted between the two people who claimed to have caught it. The story was made into a documentary, Up for Grabs. It was sold in auction to Todd McFarlane for $450,000.
- Barry Bonds' record-breaking 756th home run, beating Hank Aaron's record, caught by a New York Mets fan in 2007. It was later sold at an online auction for more than $750,000 to Marc Eckō, a New York fashion designer.
- Derek Jeter's 3,000th hit, a home run, was caught by a New York Yankees fan who gave the ball back to the Yankees and was rewarded with about $70,000 worth of gifts and memorabilia.
- Roger Maris' 61st single-season home run was caught barehanded by a truck driver. The ball was sold at the price of $5,000.

Other famous baseballs:

- Babe Ruth's home run in the 1933 MLB All-Star Game sold for over $800,000. It was also signed by him.
- Hank Aaron's 755th home run ball sold for $650,000 at auction in 1999. The ball was kept in a safe deposit box for 23 years after groundskeeper Richard Arndt was fired from the Milwaukee Brewers for not returning the ball, even though he had attempted to the previous day.
- A baseball signed by both Joe DiMaggio and Marilyn Monroe (who were married for less than a year) in 1961 during spring training in Florida sold for $191,200 at auction.
- The ball that rolled between Bill Buckner's legs (and cost Boston extra innings) during the 1986 World Series sold for $418,250 at auction.
- Steve Bartman interfered with a play while attempting to catch a foul ball, causing the Chicago Cubs not to get an out in "The Inning" during the 2003 NLCS. The loose ball was snatched up by a Chicago lawyer and sold at an auction in December 2003. Grant DePorter purchased it for $113,824.16 on behalf of Harry Caray's Restaurant Group. On February 26, 2004, it was publicly exploded in a procedure designed by Cubs fan and Academy Award winning special effects expert Michael Lantieri. In 2005, the remains of the ball were used by the restaurant in a pasta sauce. While no part of the ball itself was in the sauce, the ball was boiled in water, beer, vodka, and herbs and the steam captured, condensed, and added to the final concoction.

== See also ==
- Cricket ball—ball as used in cricket of similar construction (cork center wrapped tightly with string and encased in leather with parallel sets of raised stitching across its girth).
- Spaldeen, a ball used for stickball, a variant of baseball.
- Juiced ball theory
- M67 grenade, a frag grenade designed like a baseball.

== Notes and references ==
- Major League Baseball: Official Rules: 1.00 Objectives of the Game See 1.09.
