= Aztec Two-Step =

American band

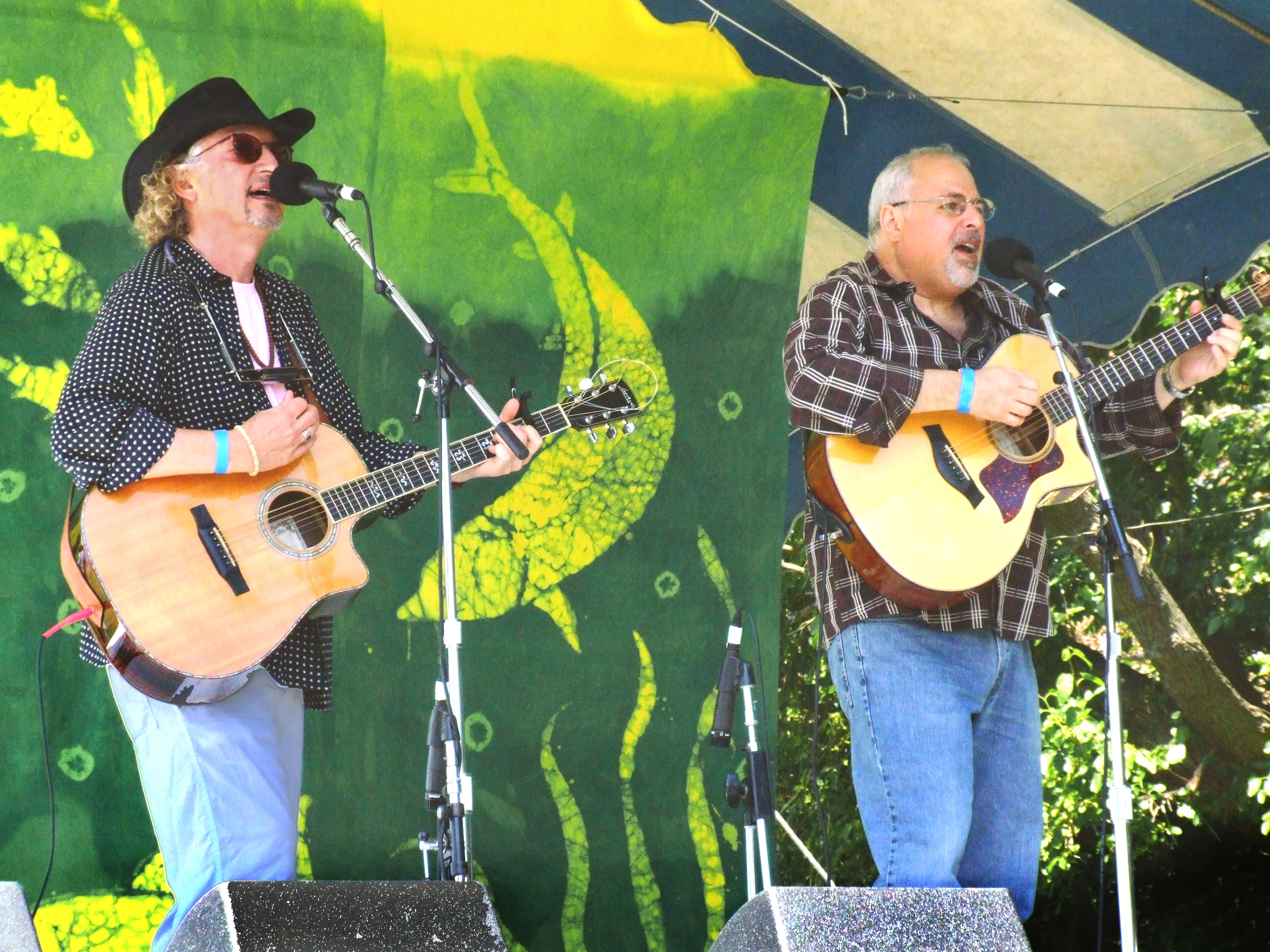
- Fowler and Shulman at the Clearwater Festival in 2007

Background information
- Also known as: Aztec Two-Step 2.0
- Origin: Boston, Massachusetts
- Years active: 1971–present
- Labels: Elektra; RCA; Red Engine
- Members: Rex Fowler; Dodie Pettit; Steven “Muddy” Roues; Peter Hohmeister; Joe Meo
- Past members: Neal Shulman

Aztec Two-Step is an American folk-rock band, formed by Rex Fowler and Neal Shulman at a chance meeting on open stage, at a Boston coffee house, the Stone Phoenix, in 1971. Fowler grew up in Connecticut and Maine, and Shulman grew up in Manhattan. The band was named after a line from a poem that appeared in A Coney Island of the Mind by Lawrence Ferlinghetti. Former Maine State Representative Chris Greeley once worked as a light man for the group.

After two months in Boston, the duo moved to New York City, which remained their base. Within a year after meeting, they had a contract with Elektra Records to make their first album. This self-titled debut on Elektra was followed by three albums with RCA Records. They are noted for longevity as a duo, with a career of more than 40 years of performing together. Fowler once explained, "we've survived with pure guile, DIY's and the support of our fan base which we established by recording on two major labels (Elektra and RCA Records) back in the Seventies."

In 1982, Aztec Two-Step played two sold-out performances at The Door (formerly The Cellar Door), the iconic Washington DC club in Georgetown, becoming the last band to play at the club before it closed. On that night, "possibly as a diversionary move to keep the doors open," the audience called the duo back for eight encores.

They received the New York Music Award for Best Folk Album in 1986, and have performed on TV and radio programs such as Late Night with David Letterman, The King Biscuit Flower Hour, and World Cafe Live. A documentary about the band, No-Hit Wonder, aired on PBS in 1999.

Since Shulman's retirement in 2017, the band has toured as Aztec Two-Step 2.0, a term coined by former bandmate Shulman to describe the group's new sound.

== Discography ==
- Aztec Two-Step (1972)
- Second Step (1975)
- Two's Company (1976)
- Adjoining Suites (1977)
- Times of Our Lives (1979)
- Living in America (1986)
- See It Was Like This... (1989)
- Of Age (1993)
- Highway Signs (1996) (Live album)
- Gettysburg: Reflections on American Life (2001)
- Live and Rare (2001)
- Plums (2003)
- Days of Horses (2004)
- Time It Was - The Simon & Garfunkel Songbook (2009)
- The Persecution & Restoration of Aztec Two-Step (An Anthology) (2009)
- Cause And Effect (2012)
- Naked (2017)
