= Emily Is Away Too =

2017 indie visual novel game

- Publisher: Kyle Seeley
- Designer: Kyle Seeley
- Writer: Kyle Seeley
- Series: Emily Is Away
- Engine: Unity
- Platforms: Windows, Mac OS X, Linux
- Release: 26 May 2017
- Genres: Visual novel, Romance
- Mode: Single player

Emily Is Away Too (Note: Stylized as Emily is Away Too and emily is away too) is a 2017 indie visual novel by Kyle Seeley. It is the spiritual successor to the 2015 video game Emily Is Away. (Note: The title of which is stylized as Emily is Away and emily is away) The game is primarily set in an instant messaging chat client, taking place during the protagonist's last year of high school during the 2006–07 school year. The player talks to other characters by selecting different responses, and specific choices change the course of the plot throughout the game. In addition to using the chat log, the player also visits parody websites such as YouToob and Facenook, all of which display their 2006/2007 layouts.

== Plot ==
Gameplay screenshot.

The game is divided into five chapters which take place a couple months apart from each other over the course of the school year. In each chapter, the player is given the option of changing avatars and editing their profile with references to whatever was popular at the time. Their friends also show progression by choosing new icons, editing their profile, and setting new away messages.

The game's plot centers around the protagonist's relationship to their friends Emily and Evelyn from school. Prior to the start of the game, the protagonist met them under different circumstances, and the two girls themselves do not know each other. In each chapter, the protagonist talks to both characters individually with the chat client, alternating back and forth between conversing with each.

In the first two chapters, the player will learn about Emily and Evelyn. The two of them have very different personalities and have differing opinions on many topics, including taste in music and how to spend life after college. The player will also be asked a series of questions about themselves by each of them separately. Both characters are in a relationship that they hint is not going well due to them feeling used and manipulated by their partners.

In chapter three, the rocky relationships Emily and Evelyn are in have reached a breaking point, and both of them ask the protagonist for help after their partners did something particularly upsetting. However, the player will only have the time to help one of them, and the other will angrily leave the conversation and log off. The player nonetheless is able to calm down the one they were able to help and give them advice for their situation.

In chapter four, the advice given by the player in the previous chapter worked successfully. The one they had chosen to help managed to end the relationship they were previously in and became close with the protagonist instead, potentially entering a relationship depending on the player's choices. At the end of the chapter, the one that the player didn't help in the previous chapter talks to the protagonist for the first time since that day. They apologize for what they said to the player in the previous chapter and wish to start talking with them again. They state they got out of the relationship they were previously stuck in, and now are looking forward to moving on from high school and starting a new one in college.

In the fifth and final chapter, Emily and Evelyn get to know each other when they are placed in the same class, and the two will talk about the protagonist. What they say, and the events that follow, depend on the player's actions from the first two chapters; specifically whether or not the player's answers to questions about themselves were consistent when asked by each character.

If the player's answers were not consistent, the character the player didn't help in chapter three will point out all inconsistencies to the one they helped. This will severely damage their trust in the player, believing they lied just to get close to them. The protagonist will attempt to talk things out and regain their trust, but will fail regardless of what the player chooses to say. Believing the protagonist to be no better than the manipulative partner of their previous relationship, they will end all ties with them.

If the player's answers were consistent, the character the player didn't help in chapter three will say nice things about the protagonist, specifically pointing out their honesty. The one the player helped will thank the protagonist for being truthful to them the entire time, and any worries they had about them being manipulative like their previous partner will be gone. From here, the player can choose whether to be just friends with them, enter a relationship with them if they hadn't already, or continue their relationship into college if they were already in one.

== Reception ==
The game received "generally favorable reviews" according to the review aggregator website Metacritic, where it garnered a rating of 81/100 based on 4 professional critics.

Destructoid said that while the game was "heartbreaking", it "wasn't perfect".

Polygon ranked the game 26th on their list of the 50 best games of 2017.

== Sequel ==
A third entry to the series, Emily Is Away <3, (Note: Stylized as Emily is Away <3 and emily is away <3) was revealed by Kyle Seeley in March 2019 with a teaser video. The game's website was also updated to Emily Is Away <3. In contrast to the use of the AOL Instant Messenger styled chat client in the previous installments, Emily Is Away <3 primarily takes on the online social media website Facenook, a parody of Facebook. The game takes place in 2008; around the same time Facebook was gaining massive popularity. A development update revealed more of the game's features, including the ability to write statuses, post on friend's walls, and get into poke wars.

The game was released on 16 April 2021.
