= List of DualDisc releases =

The following is a list of albums and singles released on DualDisc.

The DVD side of some DualDiscs is DVD-Audio formatted, often including DVD-Video files as well for wider compatibility. However, some releases simply used the standard DVD-Video format, typically including the album audio in standard-resolution stereo and/or 5.1 surround sound, rather than the high-resolution audio typical of DVD-Audio.

List of DualDisc releases, including release date and label
Release date	Artist	Title	Label	DVD format	DVD audio format(s)	Notes
March 2004 (Note: Released in test markets in March 2004; reissued for wide release in 2005.)	3 Doors Down	Away from the Sun	Republic / Universal	DVD-Audio	5.1 surround / Stereo	DVD extra: "The Road I'm On" music video.
February 8, 2005	3 Doors Down	Seventeen Days	Republic / Universal	DVD-Audio	5.1 surround / Stereo (Note: Standard album included in 5.1 surround and stereo; bonus tracks included in stereo only.)	Includes four bonus tracks. DVD extras: "Let Me Go" music video and TV performance.
February 8, 2005	AC/DC	Back in Black				
	Aerosmith	Rockin' the Joint				
April 26, 2005	Amerie	Touch	Richcraft / Sony Urban / Columbia	DVD-Video	Stereo	DVD extras: Bonus tracks, interview, making-of featurette, music videos.
	Alan Hovhaness	Janabar, Talin, Shambala	OgreOgress			
	Alan Parsons	A Valid Path				
	Anna Vissi	Nylon				First DualDisc released in Greece and Cyprus.
	Anne Murray	I'll Be Seeing You				
	Anssi Kela	Rakkaus on murhaa				First DualDisc by a Finnish artist.
	Aqualung	Strange and Beautiful				
February 3, 2004	Audioslave	Audioslave	Epic / Interscope	DVD-Video	Stereo	Released in test markets only. DVD extras: Music videos, documentary including live performances, photo gallery.
February 8, 2005	Avril Lavigne	Under My Skin	RCA / BMG (NA); Arista / RCA (EU)	DVD-Video	Stereo	DVD extras: Music videos, photo gallery.
June 14, 2005	Backstreet Boys	Never Gone	Jive	DVD-Video	5.1 surround / Stereo	DVD extras: "Incomplete" music video and making-of featurette, photo gallery, discography.
August 30, 2005	Barbra Streisand	Guilty (25th Anniversary Edition)	Columbia	DVD-Video	Stereo	DVD extras: Interview, live performances, Guilty Pleasures preview, photo gallery.
September 20, 2005	Barbra Streisand	Guilty Pleasures (Note: Titled Guilty Too in some territories.)	Columbia	DVD-Video	Stereo	DVD extras: Making-of documentary, music videos.
January 31, 2006	Barry Manilow	The Greatest Songs of the Fifties	Arista	DVD-Video	Stereo	DVD extra: Making-of documentary.
October 31, 2006	Barry Manilow	The Greatest Songs of the Sixties	Arista	DVD-Video	Stereo	DVD extra: Making-of documentary. Released in the US exclusively at Target stores.
September 18, 2007	Barry Manilow	The Greatest Songs of the Seventies (deluxe edition)	Arista	DVD-Video	Stereo	Bonus disc accompanying the album on standard CD, comprising four bonus tracks. DVD extra: Making-of documentary.
	Béla Fleck and the Flecktones	The Hidden Land				
October 25, 2005	Bette Midler	Bette Midler Sings the Peggy Lee Songbook	Columbia	DVD-Video	Stereo	DVD extras: Performance videos, rare footage of Peggy Lee, interviews.
	Ben Folds	Songs for Silverman				
June 27, 2006	Björk	Surrounded	One Little Indian (UK/JP); Polydor (EU); Rhino / Elektra (US)	DVD-Video	5.1 surround	7-disc box set including all of Björk's studio albums to 2006.
November 2, 2004	Blondie	The Curse of Blondie	Silverline / Sanctuary	DVD-Audio	5.1 surround	DVD extra: "Good Boys" music video.
	Bo Bice	The Real Thing				
September 20, 2005	Bon Jovi	Have a Nice Day	Island	DVD-Audio	5.1 surround / Stereo	DVD extras: EPK, "Have a Nice Day" music video, live videos.
September 20, 2005	Bon Jovi	Slippery When Wet	Mercury / Chronicles / UMe	DVD-Audio	5.1 surround / Stereo	DVD extras: Music videos.
	Bow Wow	Wanted				
April 26, 2005	Bowling for Soup	A Hangover You Don't Deserve	Jive	DVD-Video	5.1 surround / Stereo	DVD extras: Music videos, acoustic performance video.
	Boz Scaggs	Fade Into Light				
April 26, 2005	Britney Spears	In the Zone	Jive	DVD-Video	5.1 surround / Stereo	Includes a bonus track. DVD extras: Music videos.
April 26, 2005	Bruce Springsteen	Devils & Dust	Columbia	DVD-Video	5.1 surround / Stereo	DVD extras: Artist commentary, acoustic performance videos.
April 25, 2006	Bruce Springsteen	We Shall Overcome: The Seeger Sessions	Columbia	DVD-Video	Stereo	DVD extras: Bonus tracks, making-of documentary, artist commentary, performance videos.
	Bury Your Dead	Alive				
July 19, 2005	Carly Simon	Moonlight Serenade	Columbia	DVD-Video	Stereo	DVD extras: Making-of featurettes, interview.
	Casting Crowns	Lifesong				
	Chevelle	This Type of Thinking (Could Do Us In)				
	Cassidy	I'm a Hustla				
	Chris Botti	To Love Again: The Duets				
	Chris Botti	When I Fall in Love				
	Chris Brown	Chris Brown				
	Chris Rice	Amusing				
	Corrosion of Conformity	America's Volume Dealer				
	Crossfade	Crossfade				
	Crowded House	Crowded House				
November 8, 2005	Cyndi Lauper	The Body Acoustic	Epic / Daylight	DVD-Video	Stereo	DVD extras: Music videos, making-of featurette.
November 16, 2004	Dar Williams	The Green World	Silverline	DVD-Video	5.1 surround / Stereo	DVD extras: Tour rehearsal footage, photo gallery.
November 16, 2004	Dar Williams	The Beauty of the Rain	Silverline	DVD-Video	5.1 surround / Stereo	DVD extra: Photo gallery.
November 8, 2005	Darlene Zschech	Change Your World	INO	DVD-Video	No album audio	DVD contents: Making-of featurette, music video.
	Dave Matthews Band	Stand Up				
February 8, 2005	David Bowie	Reality	ISO / Columbia	DVD-Video	5.1 surround / Stereo	DVD extras: Short film, photo gallery, biography, discography.
	David Gray	Life in Slow Motion				
	David Huff	Really				
	Death	The Sound of Perseverance				
October 25, 2005	Destiny's Child	#1's	Columbia / Sony Urban	DVD-Video	Stereo	DVD extras: Music videos, live DVD trailer.
October 18, 2005	Destiny's Child	8 Days of Christmas	Columbia / Music World / Sony Urban	DVD-Video	Stereo	DVD extras: Music video, live video, bonus track, interview featurette, live DVD trailer.
February 8, 2005	Destiny's Child	Destiny Fulfilled	Columbia / Sony Urban	DVD-Video	5.1 surround / Stereo	DVD extras: Interview, music videos, bonus tracks.
	Devo	Devo Live 1980				
November 23, 2004	Diana Krall	The Girl in the Other Room	Verve	DVD-Audio	5.1 surround / Stereo	DVD extras: "Narrow Daylight" music video, live performances, biography, photo gallery.
	Dire Straits	Brothers in Arms (20th Anniversary Edition)				
March 8, 2005	Dishwalla	Opaline	Immergent	DVD-Video	5.1 surround	CD side encoded as HDCD. DVD extras: Artist commentary, music videos, photo gallery.
November 1, 2005	Dishwalla	Live... Greetings from the Flow State	Immergent	DVD-Video	5.1 surround / Stereo	DVD extras: Bonus track, live videos, "Home" music video, photo gallery.
	Dokken	Erase the Slate				
	Donald Fagen	The Nightfly				
	Donnie McClurkin	Again				
	Dr. Dre	The Chronic				
	Duran Duran	Astronaut				
	Ensiferum	Victory Songs				
	Eros Ramazzotti	Calma apparente				
August 30, 2005	Eric Clapton	Back Home	Reprise	DVD-Audio	5.1 surround / Stereo	DVD extras: Interview, performance videos.
August 23, 2005	Fear Factory	Transgression	Calvin	DVD-Video	Stereo	DVD extras: Music videos, documentary making of the cd.
	Fiona Apple	Extraordinary Machine				
	Foo Fighters	In Your Honor				
	Frankie J	The One				
	Franz Ferdinand	You Could Have It So Much Better				
September 01, 2009	Friendly Fires	Friendly Fires	XL Recordings	DVD-Video		DVD extras: live performance, music videos
	Ginuwine	Back II Da Basics				
	Grateful Dead	American Beauty				
	God Forbid	IV: Constitution of Treason				
February 8, 2005	Good Charlotte	The Young and the Hopeless	Epic / Daylight	DVD-Video	Stereo	DVD extras: Making-of featurette, photo gallery, discography.
March 29, 2005	Good Charlotte	The Chronicles of Life and Death	Epic / Daylight	DVD-Video	5.1 surround / Stereo	DVD extras: Interviews, live performances.
September 27, 2005	Gretchen Wilson	All Jacked Up	Epic / Sony Nashville	DVD-Video	Stereo	DVD extras: Making-of featurette, "All Jacked Up" music video, photo gallery.
March 22, 2005	Gretchen Wilson	Here for the Party	Epic / Sony Nashville	DVD-Video	5.1 surround	DVD extras: Interview, music videos, live performances.
	Hacken Lee	Concert Hall				
	Heather Headley	In My Mind				
	The Hidden Hand	Devoid of Colour				
December 20, 2005	Hooverphonic	No More Sweet Music	Columbia	DVD-Video	5.1 surround	2-disc set. DVD extras: Interviews, making-of documentary, music videos.
	Ian Gillan	Gillan's Inn				
	Il Divo	Il Divo				
February 8, 2005	Incubus	A Crow Left of the Murder				
	Indigo Girls	All That We Let In				
	INXS	Switch				
	Jack Johnson	In Between Dreams				
	Jamie Foxx	Unpredictable				
September 20, 2005	Jamiroquai	Dynamite	Epic	DVD-Video	Stereo	DVD extras: Making-of featurette, music videos.
	Jason Mraz	Mr. A-Z				
March 1, 2005	Jennifer Lopez	Rebirth	Epic	DVD-Video	Stereo	DVD extras: Making-of featurette, "Get Right" music videos.
March 22, 2005	Jessica Simpson	In This Skin	Columbia	DVD-Video	5.1 surround / Stereo	DVD extras: Jessica and Nick's wedding footage, Newlyweds excerpts, making-of featurette, music videos.
July 11, 2006	The Jesus and Mary Chain	Psychocandy	Blanco y Negro / Rhino	DVD-Audio	Stereo	DVD extras: Music videos.
July 11, 2006	The Jesus and Mary Chain	Darklands	Blanco y Negro / Rhino	DVD-Audio	Stereo	DVD extras: Music videos.
July 11, 2006	The Jesus and Mary Chain	Automatic	Blanco y Negro / Rhino	DVD-Audio	Stereo	DVD extras: Music videos.
July 11, 2006	The Jesus and Mary Chain	Honey's Dead	Blanco y Negro / Rhino	DVD-Audio	Stereo	DVD extras: Music videos.
July 11, 2006	The Jesus and Mary Chain	Stoned & Dethroned	Blanco y Negro / Rhino	DVD-Audio	Stereo	DVD extras: Music videos.
	Jim Jones	Harlem: Diary of a Summer				
	Joe Perry	Joe Perry				
	Joey Ramone	Don't Worry About Me				
2008	Jonathan King	Vile Pervert				
	John Legend	Get Lifted				
February 8, 2005	John Mayer	Heavier Things	Aware / Columbia	DVD-Video	5.1 surround / Stereo	DVD extras: The Paul Reddy Show interview, discography.
June 7, 2005	John Mayer	Room for Squares	Aware / Columbia	DVD-Video	5.1 surround / Stereo	DVD extra: Making-of documentary.
	John Oates	John Oates Solo: The Album, The Concert				
2006	Jonas Brothers	It's About Time	Daylight / Columbia	DVD-Video	Stereo	Features a different track list from the standard CD edition. DVD extras: Music videos, making-of featurettes.
February 8, 2005	Joshua Bell	Romance of the Violin				
March 1, 2005	Judas Priest	Angel of Retribution				
December 7, 2004	Keane	Hopes and Fears	Interscope	DVD-Audio	5.1 surround / Stereo	DVD extras: Music videos, photo gallery.
	Lamb of God	Ashes of the Wake				
	Live	Songs from Black Mountain				
	Lee Ann Womack	Greatest Hits				
	Linkin Park	Reanimation				
October 25, 2005	Mariah Carey	Merry Christmas	Columbia	DVD-Video	Stereo	DVD extras: Music videos.
	Massive Attack	Collected				
February 20, 2006 (Note: Released in Europe in weekly installments between February 20, 2006, and June 26, 2006; released in North America on November 14, 2006.)	Michael Jackson	Visionary: The Video Singles	Epic / Legacy	DVD-Video	Stereo	Box set; the only release of DualDisc singles.
November 22, 2005	Michael W. Smith	Healing Rain	Reunion	DVD-Video	5.1 surround / Stereo	DVD extras: Interview, music videos, The Second Chance movie trailer.
November 22, 2005	Michael W. Smith	Worship	Reunion	DVD-Video	5.1 surround / Stereo	DVD extras: Concert footage, interviews, The Second Chance movie trailer.
February 8, 2005	Miles Davis	Kind of Blue	Columbia	DVD-Audio	5ch	DVD extras: making-of featurette.
November 23, 2004	Ministry	Animositisomina	Silverline	DVD-Video	5.1 surround	DVD extras: Making-of featurettes, photo gallery.
November 16, 2004	Ministry	Sphinctour	Silverline	DVD-Video	5.1 surround	DVD extras: "So What" live video, photo gallery, biography, tour dates.
	Miranda Lambert	Kerosene				
	Modest Mouse	Good News for People Who Love Bad News				
	Morbid Angel	Altars of Madness				
	Motörhead	Deaf Forever: The Best of Motörhead				
	Mudvayne	The End of All Things to Come				
	Mudvayne	Lost and Found				
August 2, 2005	Natasha Bedingfield	Unwritten	Phonogenic / Epic	DVD-Video	Stereo	DVD extras: Music videos, making-of featurettes.
	Nellie McKay	Get Away from Me				
	Nightwish	Once				
October 11, 2005	Nina Simone	The Soul of Nina Simone	RCA / Legacy	DVD-Video	Stereo	DVD extras: Live performances.
	Nine Inch Nails	The Downward Spiral	Nothing / Interscope	DVD-Video	5.1 surround	DVD extras: Photo gallery, discography.
May 3, 2005	Nine Inch Nails	With Teeth	Nothing / Interscope	DVD-Video	5.1 surround	DVD extras: Photo gallery, discography.
	Oasis	Definitely Maybe				
	Oasis	Don't Believe the Truth				
	The Offspring	Greatest Hits				
February 22, 2005	Omarion	O				
	Our Lady Peace	Healthy in Paranoid Times				
	Ozzy Osbourne	Under Cover				
	Peter Gallagher	7 Days in Memphis				
	Pete Townshend	Rough Mix				
April 4, 2006	Pink	I'm Not Dead	LaFace	DVD-Video	5.1 surround / Stereo	DVD extras: Live in Europe trailer, interviews, "Stupid Girls" music video and outtakes.
	Pitty	Anacrônico				
	R.E.M.	Automatic for the People				
	R.E.M.	Document				
	Ricky Martin	Life				
	Ringo Starr	Choose Love				
April 19, 2005	Rob Thomas	...Something to Be	Melisma / Atlantic	DVD-Audio	5.1 surround / Stereo	DVD extras: Making-of documentary, photo gallery.
October 4, 2005	Sara Groves	Add to the Beauty	INO / Sponge (Note: Co-released with Columbia Records for the mainstream market.)	DVD-Video	Stereo	DVD extras: Making-of featurette, hurricane relief featurette, live performance.
	Shakira	Fijación Oral, Vol. 1				
	Shakira	Oral Fixation, Vol. 2				
2004	Sheryl Crow	The Globe Sessions	A&M	DVD-Audio	5.1 surround	DVD extras: Music videos, making-of featurette.
	Simple Plan	Still Not Getting Any...				
	Son Volt	Okemah and the Melody of Riot				
	Snoop Dogg	Doggystyle				
November 23, 2004	Snow Patrol	Final Straw	A&M / Polydor / Fiction	DVD-Audio	5.1 surround / Stereo	DVD extras: Music videos, Sessions@AOL performance and interview, biography, photo gallery.
	Steve Winwood	About Time				
February 8, 2005	Switchfoot	The Beautiful Letdown				
	Switchfoot	Nothing Is Sound				
	System of a Down	Hypnotize				
October 4, 2005	Talking Heads	Talking Heads	Sire / Warner Bros. / Rhino	DVD-Audio	5.1 surround	8-disc box set containing all of the band's albums to date.
January 10, 2006	Talking Heads	Fear of Music	Sire / Warner Bros. / Rhino	DVD-Audio	5.1 surround	Individual reissues as included in the Talking Heads box set.
January 10, 2006	Talking Heads	More Songs About Buildings and Food	Sire / Warner Bros. / Rhino	DVD-Audio	5.1 surround	Individual reissues as included in the Talking Heads box set.
January 10, 2006	Talking Heads	Remain in Light	Sire / Warner Bros. / Rhino	DVD-Audio	5.1 surround	Individual reissues as included in the Talking Heads box set.
January 10, 2006	Talking Heads	Talking Heads: 77	Sire / Warner Bros. / Rhino	DVD-Audio	5.1 surround	Individual reissues as included in the Talking Heads box set.
February 14, 2006	Talking Heads	Little Creatures	Sire / Warner Bros. / Rhino	DVD-Audio	5.1 surround	Individual reissues as included in the Talking Heads box set.
February 14, 2006	Talking Heads	Naked	Sire / Warner Bros. / Rhino	DVD-Audio	5.1 surround	Individual reissues as included in the Talking Heads box set.
February 14, 2006	Talking Heads	Speaking in Tongues	Sire / Warner Bros. / Rhino	DVD-Audio	5.1 surround	Individual reissues as included in the Talking Heads box set.
February 14, 2006	Talking Heads	True Stories	Sire / Warner Bros. / Rhino	DVD-Audio	5.1 surround	Individual reissues as included in the Talking Heads box set.
	Taking Back Sunday	Tell All Your Friends				
	Tupac Shakur	All Eyez on Me				
	Tupac Shakur	The Don Killuminati: The 7 Day Theory				
	Tipper	Surrounded				
	Third Day	Wherever You Are				
	Three Days Grace	Three Days Grace				
	Three 6 Mafia	Most Known Unknown				
	Toby Keith	Shock'n Y'all				
	Traffic	The Last Great Traffic Jam				
February 8, 2005	Train	My Private Nation				
	Trey Anastasio	Shine				
February 8, 2005	Usher	8701				
	Utah Symphony Orchestra	Tchaikovsky's The Nutcracker				
November 8, 2005	Various artists	Thrasher Magazine Skate Rock, Volume 12: Eat the Flag	Volcom	DVD-Video	No album audio	DVD contents: Film, music videos, trailers and commercials.
	Various artists	The Very Best of Death Row				
February 8, 2005	Velvet Revolver	Contraband				
December 5, 2005	Westlife	Face To Face	Sony BMG	DVD-Audio		Due to the way the DVD side has been authored (title mark for each track instead of title for whole album with chapter points for each track), the audio tracks only play individually, access from "Audio" button on main menu. Printed on rear insert... "Making Of "You Raise Me Up" Video, Photo Shoot For "Face To Face", Exclusive Interview Footage" these are included in one documentary feature shown as DVD-13 above, access from "Documentary" button on main menu. "Entire Album in PCM Stereo", audio is actually Dolby Digital 2.0 48K / 448Khz.
October 3, 2006	"Weird Al" Yankovic	Straight Outta Lynwood	Volcano	DVD-Video	5.1 surround / Stereo	DVD extras: Karaoke option, music videos, making-of featurette.
February 8, 2005	Yo-Yo Ma	Yo-Yo Ma Plays Ennio Morricone				
	YoungBloodZ	Ev'rybody Know Me				
