= Live at Bearsville Theater =

Live album by Dar Williams
- Released: October 16, 2007
- Recorded: 2007
- Genre: Folk
- Label: Razor & Tie

Dar Williams chronology
My Better Self (2005)	Live at Bearsville Theater (2007)	Promised Land (2008)

Live at Bearsville Theater is a live album and DVD release from Dar Williams. It is her second live album, after 2001's Out There Live.

== Track listing ==
All songs are by Dar Williams, except for "Ripple" (a cover version of a song by the Grateful Dead from their 1970 album American Beauty).

1. "When I Was a Boy"
2. "The Ocean"
3. "The One Who Knows"
4. "The Christians and the Pagans"
5. "February"
6. "Iowa"
7. "The Babysitter's Here"
8. "As Cool as I Am"
9. "Spring Street"
10. "If I Wrote You"
11. "Mercy of the Fallen"
12. "Are You Out There"
13. "The Beauty of the Rain"
14. "The Easy Way"
15. "After All"
16. "Ripple" (Garcia, Hunter)

== Band ==
- Ben Butler - Guitar
- Steve Holley - Drums
- Mike Visceglia - Bass
