= Darleen Wilson =

American record producer and musician

Darleen Wilson is an American, Boston, Massachusetts-based folk musician, audio engineer, record producer, and Director of Content for Integrated Media at public radio and television station WGBH. She has also written articles for Performing Songwriter magazine. She sings and plays guitar in the band Birdsong at Morning with Alan Williams.

Wilson's producing credits include more than fifty albums, for artists such as:

- Catie Curtis (Truth from Lies)
- Cry Cry Cry (Cry Cry Cry)
- Patty Larkin (I'm Fine, Live in the Square)
- Bill Morrissey (Standing Eight)
- Leslie Smith (These Things Wrapped)
