= Cry Cry Cry =

Folk supergroup

Richard Shindell, Lucy Kaplansky, and Dar Williams

Cry Cry Cry was a folk supergroup, consisting of Richard Shindell, Lucy Kaplansky, and Dar Williams. The band released an eponymous album of cover songs on October 13, 1998.

The trio toured in 1999 to support the album. The tour was met with very favorable reviews.

Cry Cry Cry contributed one song to the folk-tribute album Bleecker Street: Greenwich Village in the 60's, covering Tom Paxton's "The Last Thing on My Mind". The three also joined to cover Buddy and Julie Miller's "My Love Will Follow You" on Shindell's solo album, Somewhere Near Paterson, and to provide backing vocals for the song "Blue Shadows" on Jimmie Dale Gilmore's album (produced by Buddy Miller), "One Endless Night".

They performed on Sunday, June 18, 2017, at the Hudson River Clearwater Festival for their first show in 18 years, according to a comment at the show by Dar Williams.

In December 2020, the band released a live recording on Bandcamp of their final shows from the 2018 reunion tour, recorded at The Freight and Salvage in Berkeley, California. The digital album is entitled Live @ the Freight.

== Album ==
Cry Cry Cry

Studio album by Lucy Kaplansky Richard Shindell Dar Williams
- Released: October 13, 1998
- Genre: Folk
- Length: 49:20
- Label: Razor & Tie
- Producer: Darleen Wilson

Richard Shindell chronology
Reunion Hill (1997)	''Cry Cry Cry'' (1998)	Somewhere Near Paterson (2000)

Dar Williams chronology
End of The Summer (1997)	Cry Cry Cry (1998)	The Green World (2000)

Lucy Kaplansky chronology
Flesh and Bone (1996)	Cry Cry Cry (1998)	Ten Year Night (1999)

Professional ratings
Review scores
Source	Rating
Allmusic	3/5 stars
Fretplay	4.5/5 stars
PopMatters	(mixed)
The Washington Post	(favorable)

The album, Cry Cry Cry was a great success on folk music radio. Based on playlists sent to FolkDJ-L, it ranked as the fourth most played album by folk music DJs in 1998, the fifth most played in 1999, and remained in the top 250 through 2002.

=== Track listing ===
1. "Fall on Me" (Bill Berry, Peter Buck, Mike Mills, Michael Stipe) 2:56
2. "Cold Missouri Waters" (James Keelaghan) 4:32 (based on the Mann Gulch fire)
3. "Speaking With the Angel" (Ron Sexsmith) 3:58
4. "The Kid" (Buddy Mondlock) 5:39
5. "Shades of Gray" (Robert Earl Keen) 4:58
6. "Lord, I Have Made You a Place in My Heart" (Greg Brown) 3:34
7. "By Way of Sorrow" (Julie Miller) 3:03
8. "Memphis" (Cliff Eberhardt) 4:46
9. "Northern Cross" (Leslie Smith) 2:55
10. "Down by the Water" (Jim Armenti) 3:12
11. "I Know What Kind of Love This Is" (Nerissa Nields) 4:25
12. "The Ballad of Mary Magdalen" (Richard Shindell) 5:22

=== Credits ===
- Jay Bellerose – Percussion, Drums
- Larry Campbell – Guitar (Acoustic), Fiddle, Guitar, Mandolin, Pedal Steel, Arranger, Lap Steel Guitar, Guitar (Electric Fingerpicked)
- Cry Cry Cry – Vocal Arrangement
- Cliff Eberhardt – Guitar
- Richard Gates – Bass
- Jon Herington – Guitar
- Jeff Hill – Bass, Bass (Upright)
- Lucy Kaplansky – Vocals, Harmony Vocals
- Billy Masters – Guitar (Electric)
- Chuck Parrish – Guitar (Acoustic)
- Doug Plavin – Percussion, Drums
- Michael Rivard – Bass, Fretless Bass, Bass (Upright)
- Richard Shindell – Guitar (Acoustic), Vocals, Harmony Vocals
- Alan Williams – Organ, Percussion, Arranger, Guitar (Electric), Producer
- Dar Williams – Vocals, Harmony Vocals
- Darleen Wilson – Producer
- Stephanie Winters – Cello, Treated Cello
