= Step into the Light =

Step into the Light may refer to:

- Step into the Light (album), a 1985 album by Patty Larkin
- "Step into the Light" (Darren Hayes song)
- "Step into the Light" (Myra song)
- "Step into the Light", a song on the 1996 album Black Love (The Afghan Whigs album)
- "Step Into the Light" (Dust for life song)
