= Emerald (Dar Williams album) =

Studio album by Dar Williams
- Released: May 5, 2015
- Genre: Folk
- Length: 43:24
- Label: Bread & Butter
- Producer: Dar Williams, Jeff Haynes, Josh Kaler, Stewart Lerman, Brad Wood, Rob Hyman, Jim Lauderdale, John O. Senior

Dar Williams chronology
In the Time of Gods (2012)	Emerald (2015)	I'll Meet You Here (2021)

Emerald is the ninth studio album by singer/songwriter Dar Williams, released in 2015 by Bread & Butter Music.

== Release and reception ==
Williams found herself without a record label and turned to Kickstarter to fund this recording. For AllMusic Guide, Marcy Donelson gave the album a positive review, praising the line-up of guest musicians and Williams' cover of "Johnny Appleseed" in particular. In the Colorado Springs Independent, Loring Wirbel criticizes her "noticeable formula" for songwriting but concludes that the album is, "her most cohesive set since 2003's The Beauty of the Rain".

== Track listing ==
All songs written by Dar Williams, except where noted.

1. "Something to Get Through" – 3:31
2. "FM Radio" (Williams, Jill Sobule) – 4:03
3. "Empty Plane" – 4:15
4. "Emerald" – 3:18
5. "Slippery Slope" (Williams, Jim Lauderdale) – 3:02
6. "Here Tonight" (Williams, Angel Snow) – 3:54
7. "Girl of the World" – 4:14
8. "Mad River" – 4:40
9. "Weight of the World" (Kat Goldman) – 3:18
10. "Johnny Appleseed" (Joe Strummer, Martin Slattery, Scott Shields, Tymon Dogg, Pablo Cook) – 3:54
11. "New York is a Harbor" (Williams, Bryn Roberts) – 5:15

== Personnel ==
- Dar Williams – vocals, guitar
- Jim Lauderdale
- Milk Carton Kids
- Lucy Wainwright Roche
- Angel Snow
- Jill Sobule
- Richard Thompson
- Brad Wood – production
