= I'm Fine (album) =

Studio album by Patty Larkin
- Released: 1987
- Recorded: 1987
- Genre: Folk rock
- Length: 55:00
- Label: Philo
- Producer: Darleen Wilson, Gragg Lunsford, Patty Larkin

Patty Larkin chronology
Step into the Light (1985)	I'm Fine (1987)	Live in the Square (1990)

I'm Fine is the second album by singer-songwriter Patty Larkin. It was produced in 1987 and distributed by Philo Records.

== Track listing ==
1. "Rescue Me"
2. "Justine"
3. "Window"
4. "Dangerous"
5. "I'm Fine"
6. "Pucker Up"
7. "Lately"
8. "On the Run"
9. "Don't Want to Give It Up"
10. "Island of Time"
11. "If I Were Made of Metal"
12. "Caffeine"
13. "Valentine"
14. "Day to Day"

All songs were written by Patty Larkin.

== Personnel ==
- Patty Larkin – vocals, acoustic guitar, electric guitar, accordion
- Tony Allen – drums
- Robin Batteau – violin
- James Brough – synthesizer
- Richard Gates – bass, electric bass, backing vocals
- Cercie Miller – alto saxophone, soprano saxophone
- Chuck Parrish – electric guitar
- Rick Purro – percussion
- Tim Jackson – drums
- John Curtis – mandolin, 6 string and slide guitars
- Sheldon Mirowitz – synthesizer
- Catharine David – backing vocals
- Sheila Larkin – backing vocals
- Rodney Young – backing vocals
- Charlie Kirkland – backing vocals
- David Thomas – backing vocals
- Fred Griffith – backing vocals
