= End of the Summer =

Studio album by Dar Williams
- Released: July 15, 1997
- Genre: Folk, Pop
- Length: 43:45
- Label: Razor & Tie
- Producer: Steven Miller

Dar Williams chronology
Mortal City (1996)	End of the Summer (1997)	Cry Cry Cry (1998)

Professional ratings
Review scores
Source	Rating
Allmusic	4.5/5 stars
SoundStage!	3/5 stars

End of the Summer is Dar Williams's third album, released on July 15, 1997, by Razor & Tie.

The album ends with a cover version of "Better Things," a song originally performed by The Kinks on their 1981 album Give the People What They Want.

Joan Baez covered the song "If I Wrote You" on the album Gone from Danger.

== Track listing ==
All songs written by Dar Williams, except where noted.

1. "Are You Out There" – 3:04
2. "Party Generation" – 5:09
3. "If I Wrote You" – 3:52
4. "What Do You Hear in These Sounds" – 4:30
5. "The End of the Summer" – 4:12
6. "Teenagers, Kick Our Butts" – 3:36
7. "My Friends" – 4:07
8. "Bought and Sold" – 4:35
9. "Road Buddy" – 4:20
10. "It's a War in There" – 2:55
11. "Better Things" (Ray Davies) – 3:25

== Personnel ==
- Dar Williams – Guitar, Vocals
- Larry Campbell – Guitar (Acoustic), Dobro, Guitar, Pedal Steel, Bouzouki
- Bill Dillon – Guitar, Vocals, Guitar (Electric)
- Mark Egan – Bass, Guitar
- Shane Fontayne – Guitar (Electric)
- Erik Friedlander – Cello
- William Galison – Harmonica
- Lincoln Goines – Bass (Acoustic)
- Charlie Giordano – Accordion
- Jeff Golub – Guitar, Guitar (Electric), Slide Guitar
- Steven Miller – Guitar (Acoustic), Producer, Engineer
- Shawn Pelton – Cymbals, Drums (Snare), Hi Hat
- Roger Squitero – Conga, Tambourine
- Carol Steele – Timbales
- Glen Velez – Tambourine, Bodhran, Pandeiro

Backing vocals by Dee Carstensen, Amy Fairchild, Lorraine Ferro, Justina Golden, Lucy Kaplansky, Katryna Nields, Nerissa Nields, Richard Shindell, Kaz Silver, and Joyce Zymeck.
