= Live in the Square =

Live album by Patty Larkin
- Released: 1990
- Recorded: 1990
- Genre: Folk rock
- Length: 52:00
- Label: Philo
- Producer: Darleen Wilson

Patty Larkin chronology
I'm Fine (1987)	Live in the Square (1990)	Tango (1991)

Live in the Square is singer-songwriter Patty Larkin's third album, recorded live at Sanders Theatre, Cambridge Massachusetts. Produced in 1990, it was her last album on Philo Records, it contained the following performances:

== Track listing ==
1. The Letter
2. Time Was/Solo Flight
3. Holbrook intro [speech]
4. Metal Drums
5. Had To Be (Deja Vu)
6. Suburban Roots intro [spoken]
7. I'm White
8. Lately
9. The Last Leviathan and Prelude
10. Rescue Me
11. Valentine
12. Notes to Myself intro [spoken]
13. Me
14. Ruby (Like a Jewel)
15. I'm Fine
16. 3 Amazing Vocalists intro [spoken]
17. At the Mall

All songs were written by Patty Larkin except The Last Leviathan, written by Andy Barnes

== Personnel ==
- Patty Larkin — vocals and acoustic guitar
- Richard Gates - bass guitar
