= The Honesty Room =

Studio album by Dar Williams
- Released: 1993
- Genre: Folk
- Length: 47:17
- Label: Razor & Tie
- Producers: Dar Williams, Adam Rothberg, David Seitz, Brooks Williams

Dar Williams chronology
All My Heroes Are Dead (1991)	The Honesty Room (1993)	Mortal City (1996)

The Honesty Room is the first album by singer/songwriter Dar Williams. It was released independently in 1993 and rereleased in 1995 on Razor & Tie.

== Critical reception ==
Professional ratings
Review scores
Source	Rating
AllMusic	3/5 stars

The Washington Post noted that "few of her peers write in the first person with as much wit, warmth and ... honesty."

== Track listing ==
All songs written by Dar Williams.

1. "When I Was a Boy" – 4:46
2. "Alleluia" – 3:09
3. "The Great Unknown" – 4:15
4. "When Sal's Burned Down" – 4:16
5. "The Babysitter's Here" – 3:57
6. "You're Aging Well" – 4:13
7. "Traveling Again (Traveling I)" – 3:41
8. "In Love but Not at Peace" – 2:57
9. "Mark Rothko Song" – 3:44
10. "This Is Not the House That Pain Built" – 3:36
11. "I Love, I Love (Traveling II)" – 3:05
12. "Flinty Kind of Woman" – 2:44
13. "Arrival" – 2:54

== Personnel ==
- Dar Williams - Acoustic guitar, Vocals
- Adam Rothberg - Acoustic and electric guitars, bass, organ, dobro, accordion, xylophone, congas
- Karen Casey - Violin
- Max Cohen - Electric guitar
- Mark Dann - Bass and electric guitar
- Guy DeVito - Bass
- Craig Eastman - Mandolin, viola, violin
- Gideon Freudmann - Cello
- Rebecca Koehler - Violin
- Tom McClung - Piano
- Dave Noonan - Drums
- Jaimé Morton - Handclapping
- Katryna Nields - Choir, Chorus
- Nerissa Nields - Choir, Chorus

Track information and credits adapted from album's liner notes.
