= Out There Live =

Live album by Dar Williams
- Released: 2001
- Genre: Folk
- Label: Razor & Tie

Dar Williams chronology
The Green World (2000)	Out There Live (2001)	The Beauty of the Rain (2003)

Professional ratings
Review scores
Source	Rating
Allmusic	link

Out There is the first live album by Dar Williams.

== Track listing ==
All songs by Dar Williams, except as noted.

1. "As Cool as I Am" 3:47
2. "If I Wrote You" 4:05
3. "Spring Street" 5:00
4. "I Won't Be Your Yoko Ono Intro" 2:13
5. "I Won't Be Your Yoko Ono" 3:37
6. "February" 3:57
7. "The Ocean" 5:20
8. "Better Things" (Ray Davies) 3:02
9. "Iowa" 5:32
10. "End of the Summer" 4:26
11. "We Learned the Sea" 2:47
12. "Are You Out There Intro" 0:21
13. "Are You Out There" 3:02
14. "When I Was a Boy" 5:06
15. "What Do You Hear in These Sounds" 4:10
16. "After All" 4:49
17. "The Babysitter's Here Intro" 1:43
18. "The Babysitter's Here" 4:18
19. "Christians and Pagans" 3:31

== Personnel ==
- Dar Williams - vocals, guitar
- Steuart Smith – guitar, keyboards, background vocals
- Jeff Kazee – keyboards, background vocals
- Gail Ann Dorsey – bass guitar, background vocals
- Steve Holley – drums, percussion, background vocals
