= The Christians and the Pagans =

The Christians and the Pagans (EP)

EP by Dar Williams
- Released: 1996
- Genre: Folk
- Label: Razor & Tie

The Christians and the Pagans is an EP by Dar Williams released as a holiday bonus by Razor and Tie. It is also the name of a song by the same artist from the subsequent album Mortal City.

== Track listing ==
1. "The Christians and the Pagans"
2. "Traveling Again" (Solo)
3. "Nora"
