= 25 (Patty Larkin album) =

Studio album by Patty Larkin
- Released: March 9, 2010
- Genre: Folk
- Length: 97:11
- Label: Road Narrows/Signature Sounds
- Producer: Patty Larkin

Patty Larkin chronology
| Watch the Sky (2008) | 25 (2010) | Still Green (2013) |

25 is singer-songwriter Patty Larkin's twelfth album. Released by Road Narrows Records and Signature Sounds on March 9, 2010, it is a retrospective done in her 25th year as a professional recording artist and contains 25 songs, each recorded with backing from a different friend.

== Track listing ==
All songs were written by Patty Larkin.

1. "Lately" (with Martin Sexton)
2. "Only One" (with Jonatha Brooke)
3. "Open Arms" (with Bruce Cockburn)
4. "The Cranes" (with David Wilcox)
5. "Closest Thing" (with Rosanne Cash)
6. "Hallelujah" (with Shawn Colvin)
7. "Coming Up for Air" (with Jennifer Kimball)
8. "Tango" (with Lucy Kaplansky)
9. "You and Me" (with Willy Porter)
10. "Brazil" (with Chris Smither)
11. "Island of Time" (with Cheryl Wheeler)
12. "Cupid's Knee" (with Catie Curtis)
13. "Home" (with Birdsong at Morning)
14. "Pablo Neruda" (with Suzanne Vega)
15. "Beautiful" (with Erin McKeown)
16. "Booth of Glass" (with Peter Mulvey)
17. "Good Thing" (with Dar Williams)
18. "Déjà Vu" (with John Gorka)
19. "Inside Your Painting" (with Merrie Amsterburg)
20. "Chained to These Lovin' Arms" (with Mary Chapin Carpenter)
21. "Italian Shoes" (with Janis Ian)
22. "Here" (with Greg Brown)
23. "St. Augustine" (with Beppe Gambetta)
24. "Lost & Found" (with The She-las)
25. "I'm Fine" (with The Nields)
