= Promised Land (Dar Williams album) =

Studio album by Dar Williams
- Released: September 9, 2008
- Genre: Folk
- Label: Razor & Tie
- Producer: Brad Wood

Dar Williams chronology
My Better Self (2005)	Promised Land (2008)	In the Time of Gods (2012)

Promised Land is the seventh album by Dar Williams, released on September 9, 2008, on Razor & Tie. It was her first studio album in three years.

== Reception ==
Professional ratings
Review scores
Source	Rating
AllMusic	3.5/5 stars
Paste	(commendable)
PopMatters	6/10 stars

Slant Magazine called Promised Land "perhaps her strongest start-to-finish album since 1996's Mortal City. A review from The Washington Post said the album "lacks any musical growth" though a "newcomer to her music might appreciate the tunes."

The album entered the Billboard 200 album chart at No. 95, making it the highest-charting album of her career.

== Track listing ==
All songs are written by Dar Williams if not noted otherwise.

1. "It's Alright" – 3:27
2. "Book of Love" (Dar Williams, Lara Meyerratken) – 3:34
3. "The Easy Way" – 3:31
4. "The Tide Falls Away" (Dar Williams, Gary Louris) – 2:46
5. "Buzzer" – 2:57
6. "The Business of Things" – 2:31
7. "You Are Everyone" – 4:30
8. "Go to the Woods" – 2:54
9. "Holly Tree" – 4:13
10. "Troubled Times" (Adam Schlesinger, Chris Collingwood) – 3:34
11. "Midnight Radio" (Stephen Trask) – 4:27
12. "Summerday" (Dar Williams, Rob Hyman) – 3:22

The song "Buzzer" was inspired by the Milgram experiment; "Midnight Radio" is a cover of a song from Hedwig and the Angry Inch, written by a friend of hers from college. "Troubled Times" is a cover of a Fountains of Wayne song from that band's 1999 album Utopia Parkway.
