= DualDisc =

Double-sided optical disc

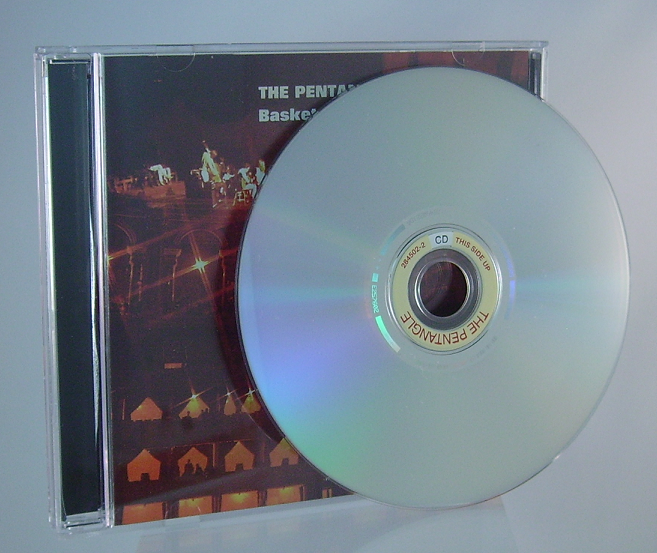
- CD side of a DualDisc
- Media type: Optical disc
- Released: 2004
- Discontinued: 2007

The DualDisc is a double-sided optical disc developed by a group of record companies including MJJ Productions Inc., EMI Music, Universal Music Group, Sony BMG Music Entertainment, Warner Music Group, and 5.1 Entertainment Group, and later supported by the Recording Industry Association of America (RIAA). It featured an audio layer intended to be compatible with CD players (but too thin to meet Red Book CD specifications) on one side and a standard DVD layer on the other. In this respect it was similar to, but distinct from, the DVDplus developed in Europe by Dieter Dierks and covered by European patents.

DualDiscs first appeared in the United States in March 2004 as part of a marketing test conducted by the same five record companies who developed the product. The test involved 13 titles being released to a limited number of retailers in the Boston, Massachusetts, and Seattle, Washington, markets. The test marketing was seen as a success after 82% of respondents to a survey (which was included with the test titles) said that DualDiscs met or exceeded their expectations. In addition, 90% of respondents said that they would recommend DualDisc to a friend. However, sales plummeted over the next three years, particularly in competition with rival formats like SACD and DVD-A discs.

DualDisc titles received a mass rollout to retailers throughout the United States in February 2005, though some titles were available as early as November 2004. The recording industry had nearly 200 DualDisc titles available by the end of 2005 and over 2,000,000 units had been sold by the middle of that year.

== Technical details ==
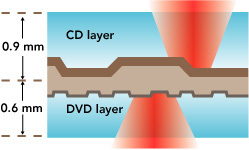
How a DualDisc works

DualDiscs were based on double-sided DVD technology such as DVD-10, DVD-14 and DVD-18 except that DualDisc technology replaced one of the DVD sides with a CD. The discs were made by fusing together a standard 0.6 mm-thick DVD layer (4.7-gigabyte storage capacity) to a 0.9 mm-thick CD layer (60-minute or 525-megabyte storage capacity), resulting in a 1.5 mm-thick double-sided hybrid disc which contained CD content on one side and DVD content on the other.

The challenge for the designers of DualDisc was to produce a dual-sided disc which was not too thick to play reliably in slot-loading drives, while the CD side was not too thin to be tracked easily by the laser. DVDplus, though conceptually similar, used a thicker CD layer and thus is more likely to get stuck in a slot-loading player (although this appears to be almost unknown); DualDisc took the other course by thinning the CD layer.

Because the 0.9 mm thickness of the DualDisc CD layer did not conform to Red Book CD specifications, which called for a layer no less than 1.1 mm thick, some CD players could not play the CD side of a DualDisc due to a phenomenon called spherical aberration. As a result, the laser reading the CD side might get a "blurry" picture of the data on the disc — the equivalent of a human reading a book with glasses of the wrong strength. Engineers tried to get around this by making the pits in the CD layer larger than on a conventional CD. This makes the CD side easier for the laser to read — equivalent to a book using bigger print to make it easier to see, even if the person's glasses are of the wrong strength. The downside to this, however, is that the playing time for the CD layer of some early DualDiscs decreased from the standard 74 minutes of a conventional CD to around 60 minutes, although this early limitation was later overcome.

Because the DualDisc CD layer did not conform to Red Book specifications, Philips and Sony (co-creators of the CD specifications) refused to allow DualDisc titles to carry the CD logo and most DualDiscs contain one of two warnings:

- "This disc is intended to play on standard DVD and CD players.
  May not play on certain car, slot-loading players and mega-disc changers."
- "The audio side of this disc does not conform to CD specifications and therefore not all DVD and CD players will play the audio side of this disc."

The DVD side of a DualDisc completely conformed to the specifications set forth by the DVD Forum and DualDiscs have been cleared to use the DVD logo.

== Hopes for DualDisc ==
Record companies had two main hopes for DualDiscs; the first being that they would eventually replace CDs as the preferred media for purchase at music retailers, and the second that the inclusion of bonus DVD content at a price similar to a conventional CD would help to slow down online music piracy by giving consumers more incentive to buy their music through retailers. Some titles such as Devils & Dust by Bruce Springsteen and Straight Outta Lynwood by "Weird Al" Yankovic have been released in the United States exclusively as DualDiscs.

=== Costs versus conventional CDs ===
In the United States, the cost of a DualDisc at retail versus that of a conventional CD varied depending on the title but, on average, a DualDisc cost about $1.50 to $2.50 more than the same title on CD. Some DualDisc titles such as Mr. A-Z by Jason Mraz and In Your Honor by the Foo Fighters had enhanced packaging which increased the retail cost of the DualDisc version of the albums over their CD counterparts more than the average. There were also other factors which go into the additional costs such as production, marketing etc.

== Common DVD content ==
What one finds on the DVD side of a DualDisc title will vary. Common content includes:

- The entire reprinted album (and possibly bonus material) in higher-quality stereophonic and/or surround sound.
- Documentaries
- Music videos
- The artist's discography
- A link to the artist's website
- There are sometimes film-and-soundtrack DualDiscs.

=== Audio types ===
The CD side of a DualDisc contained standard 16-bit LPCM audio sampled at 44.1 kHz. On the DVD side, most record companies (with the notable exception of Sony Music: see below) provided the album's music in both high-resolution, 24-bit DVD-Audio (typically at a sample rate of 96 or 192 kHz for stereo and 48 or 96 kHz for surround sound) and lower-resolution, 16-bit Dolby Digital sound (typically sampled at 48 kHz). This was done to allow consumers with DVD-Audio players access to very high-resolution stereophonic and/or surround sound versions of the album, while also providing the lower-resolution Dolby Digital stereophonic and/or surround sound which is compatible with any DVD player.

==== Sony ====
Because Sony had an existing high-resolution audio format, SACD, in the marketplace which directly competes with DVD-Audio (see next section), Sony Music, as a general rule, only provided 16-bit, 48 kHz sampled LPCM stereophonic (and sometimes Dolby Digital Surround) sound on the DVD side of their DualDiscs. The sound was compatible with any DVD player; however, it does not provide the higher fidelity and resolution of 24-bit, high sample-rate DVD-Audio.

In addition, several Sony BMG titles whose regular editions include copy protection programs (such as XCP and SunnComm) did not feature the software on the DualDisc versions.

== Competition ==
How a hybrid Super Audio CD works

The biggest competition to DualDisc was the hybrid Super Audio CD (SACD), which was developed by Sony and Philips Electronics, the same companies that created the standard CD. DualDiscs and hybrid SACDs were competing solutions to the problem of providing higher-resolution audio on a disc that can still be played on conventional CD players.

DualDiscs took the approach of using a double-sided disc to provide the necessary backwards compatibility; hybrid SACDs are a one-sided solution that instead use two layers: a conventional CD layer and a high-resolution layer.

Hybrid SACDs claim a higher compatibility rate with conventional CD players than DualDisc, because hybrid SACDs conform to Red Book standards. However, a SACD or SACD-capable DVD player is required to take advantage of the enhanced SACD layer. With a DualDisc, consumers could use their existing DVD player to hear surround mixes. (DVD-Audio capable players are required for higher-resolution audio, if present.) In 2005, it was estimated that 75% of households in the United States have at least one DVD player.

== Criticism ==
=== Manufacturer warnings ===
A number of electronics companies such as Lexicon, Marantz, Mark Levinson, Onkyo, Panasonic, Pioneer, and Sony (both its Computer Entertainment and Electronics divisions) issued statements warning consumers about possible problems with playing DualDisc titles on their equipment.

=== Legal controversy ===
There was some controversy surrounding the DualDisc format, as Dieter Dierks, the inventor of the DVDplus specification, claimed that DualDisc technology is in violation of his European patents.

== See also ==
- DVDplus
- High Definition Compatible Digital
- High Fidelity Pure Audio
- List of DualDisc releases
- Super Audio CD
- Total Hi Def
