= Lar Duggan =

- Born: 1942 (age 83–84)
- Origin: Washington, D.C., U.S.
- Instrument: Piano

Lar Duggan is an American jazz pianist, best known as an early, influential music teacher of Phish keyboardist Page McConnell. In his 1987 Goddard College thesis, McConnell wrote that Duggan was “the single most important person” in helping improve his improvisational playing.

== Background ==
Born in Washington, DC, Duggan moved with his family to the suburbs of New York City at the age of five. He began playing piano early on, taking a couple years of classical lessons in grade school, followed by several years of jazz lessons with Joel Forbes in high school. Duggan's first job was at age fifteen, sitting in for Dave McKenna. Living close to New York City in the late 1950s, Duggan went to hear the jazz icons of that era, but ended up going to college in Boston where he studied for a few months with Margaret Chaloff. Since that time, Duggan has continued to work and compose, with various non-musical jobs interspersed throughout.

== Career ==
In 1978, Duggan received a grant from the Vermont Council on the Arts to write music, which resulted in The Lake Studies, a series of sixteen eponymously named songs recorded by Charles Eller and released on Duggan's Aerie label. Two years later, Philo records re-recorded half the songs and released an album in 1980, which was reviewed by Keyboard in October 1981. In 2001, Duggan re-released his original 1978 recording. The Lake Studies remains Duggan's sole recorded material, as he has eschewed a typical musician's life of travelling and recording.

Duggan has given private piano lessons over the years, including to Page McConnell when the latter was starting in Phish. McConnell credits Duggan for teaching him fundamental improvisational techniques and methods.

== Personal life ==
Duggan has lived in the Burlington area of Vermont since 1967, and rarely ventures outside the area.

== Discography ==
- The Lake Studies (1978; partially re-recorded in 1980)
