= Dar Williams =

American singer-songwriter (born 1967)

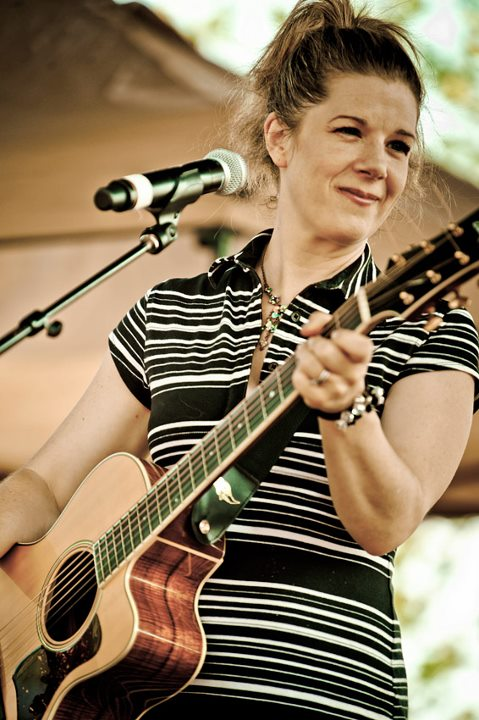
- Williams in 2011

Background information
- Born: Dorothy Snowden Williams; April 19, 1967 (age 59)
- Origin: Mount Kisco, New York
- Genres: Folk, Folk-pop, Alternative country
- Instruments: Vocals, guitar
- Years active: 1990–present
- Labels: Righteous Babe Records; Burning Field Music; Waterbug Records; Razor & Tie
- Formerly of: Cry Cry Cry
- Website: www.darwilliams.com

Dorothy Snowden "Dar" Williams (born April 19, 1967) is an American pop folk singer-songwriter from Chappaqua , New York. Hendrik Hertzberg of The New Yorker has described Williams as "one of America's very best singer-songwriters."

She is a frequent performer at folk festivals and has toured with such artists as Mary Chapin Carpenter, Patty Griffin, Ani DiFranco, the Nields, Shawn Colvin, Girlyman, Joan Baez, and Catie Curtis.

== Early life and education ==
Williams was born in Mount Kisco, New York, and grew up in Chappaqua with two older sisters, Meredith and Julie. Her nickname "Dar" originated due to a mispronunciation of "Dorothy" by one of Williams's sisters. In a 2008 interview with WUKY radio, Dar said her parents wanted to name her Darcy, after the character in Pride and Prejudice, and that they intentionally called her "Dar-Dar", which she shortened to "Dar" in school.

In interviews, she has described her parents as "liberal and loving" people who early on encouraged a career in songwriting. Williams began playing the guitar at age nine and wrote her first song two years later. However, she was more interested in drama at the time, and majored in theater and religion at Wesleyan University.

== Career ==
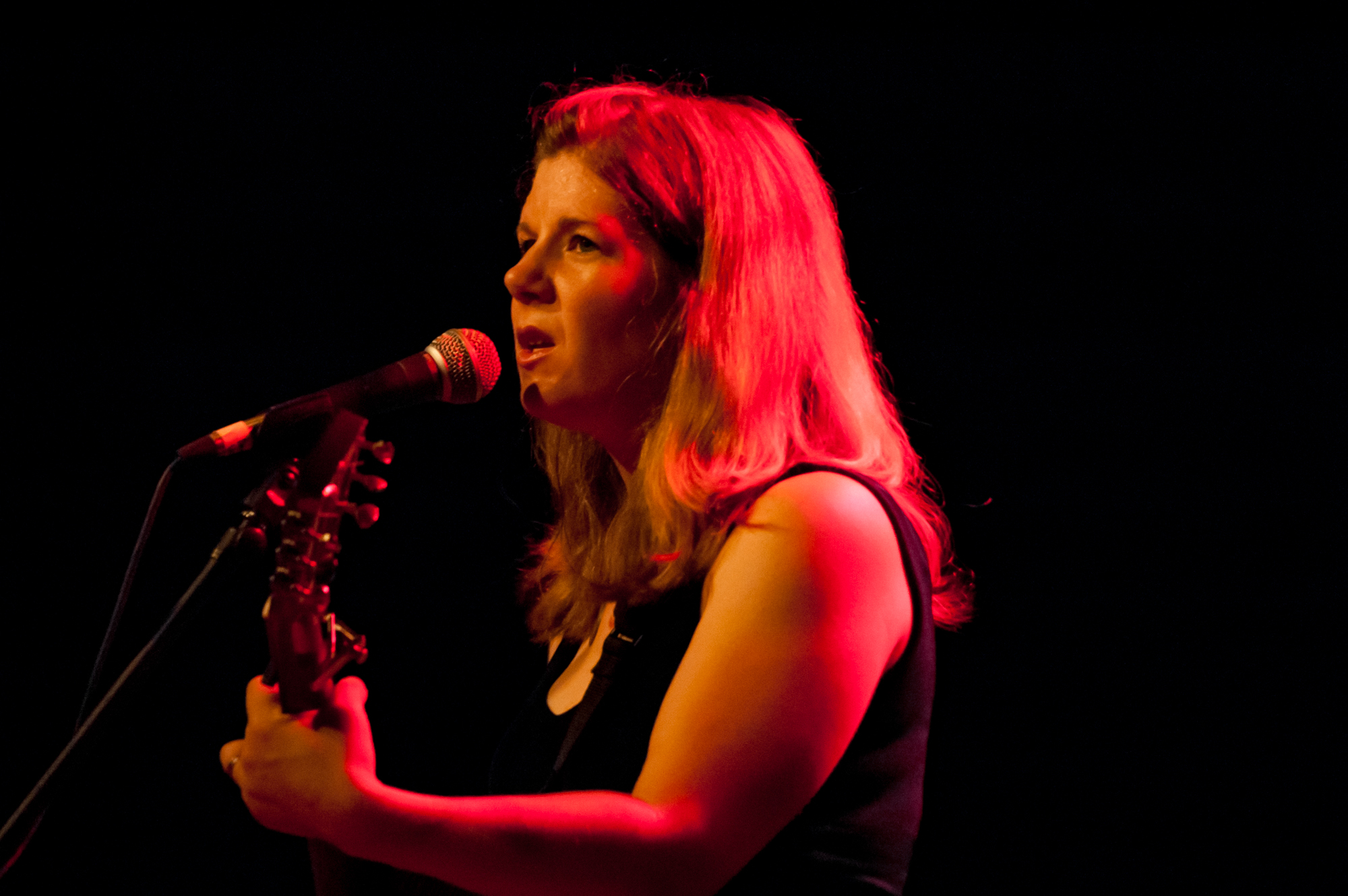
Williams in 2005, promoting My Better Self

Williams moved to Boston in 1990 to further explore a career in theater. She worked for a year as stage manager of the Opera Company of Boston, but on the side began to write songs, record demo tapes, and take voice lessons. In 1990, Dar recorded her first album, I Have No History, produced by Jeannie Deva and engineered by Rob Lehmann at Oak Grove Studios in Malden, Massachusetts. One year later in 1991, Dar recorded her second album, All My Heroes Are Dead, most of which was recorded at Wellspring Sound in Newton, Massachusetts. This album included "Mark Rothko Song", the original recording of which was included on her next album The Honesty Room. In 1993 Williams moved to Northampton, Massachusetts. Early in Williams's music career, she opened for Joan Baez, who would make her relatively well known by recording some of her songs (Williams also dueted with Baez on Ring Them Bells). Her growing popularity has since relied heavily on community coffeehouses, public radio, and an extensive fan base on the Internet.

Williams recorded her first full album, The Honesty Room, under her own label, Burning Field Music. Guest artists included Nerissa and Katryna Nields, Max Cohen and Gideon Freudmann. The album was briefly distributed by Chicago-based Waterbug Records. Williams soon secured a licensing-and-distribution deal for Burning Field with Razor and Tie, and in 1995 reissued the album on that label, with two re-recorded bonus tracks. The record went on to become one of the top-selling independent folk albums of the year. 1996's Mortal City, also licensed and distributed with Razor and Tie, received substantial notice, partially due to the fact that it coincided with her tour with Baez. The album again featured guest appearances by the Nields sisters and Freudmann, as well as noted folk artists John Prine, Cliff Eberhardt and Lucy Kaplansky. With that success, Razor & Tie re-released The Honesty Room. By the time of her third release, End of The Summer (1997), Williams's career had gathered substantial momentum, and the album did remarkably well, given its genre and independent label status.

In 1998, Williams, Richard Shindell and Lucy Kaplansky formed the group Cry Cry Cry as a way to pay homage to some of their favorite folk artists. The band released an eponymous album of covers and toured from 1998 to 2000. In June 2017, Cry Cry Cry reunited for the first time to play at the Clearwater Festival in New York.

She has since released six more studio albums on the Razor & Tie label (The Green World (2000), which included "Spring Street", based on Spring Street in SoHo in Manhattan), The Beauty of the Rain (2003), My Better Self (2005), Promised Land (2008), Many Great Companions (2010), and In the Time of Gods (2012), as well as two live albums: Out There Live (2001) and Live at Bearsville Theater (2007).

Williams founded the Snowden Environmental Trust and has been a part of many benefit concerts. She performed in a show at Alcatraz with Baez and the Indigo Girls, to benefit the prisoner-rights group Bread and Roses.

As someone who has toured a great deal and had trouble finding suitable food on the road, Williams was inspired to write and publish a directory of natural food stores and restaurants called The Tofu Tollbooth in 1994. In 1998, Williams co-authored a second edition with Elizabeth Zipern.

Williams wrote a book, released on September 5, 2017, titled What I Found in a Thousand Towns: A Traveling Musicians Guide to Rebuilding America's Communities – One Coffee Shop, Dog Run, & Open-Mike Night at a Time, that focuses in part on rebuilding smaller cities and larger towns in America.

On April 18, 2025, Ani DiFranco welcomed Williams to Righteous Babe Records. She also hinted at a new recording. Williams' new album, Hummingbird Highway, was released on September 12, 2025.

== Personal life ==
On May 4, 2002, she married Michael Robinson, an old friend from college. Their son, Stephen Gray Robinson, was born on April 24, 2004. In addition, they have an adopted daughter named Taya, who was born in Ethiopia. Williams and Robinson divorced prior to 2020 but remain friends. Williams resides in the Hudson Valley region of New York.

== Songs ==
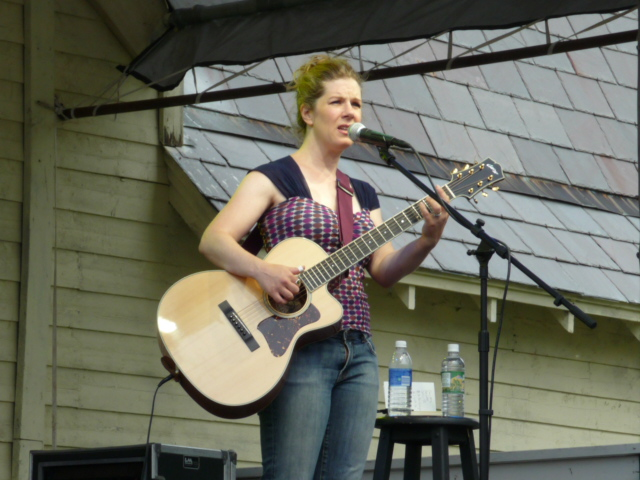
Williams onstage in 2008

Recurrent themes in Williams's songs include religion, adolescence, gender issues, anti-commercialism, misunderstood relationships, loss, humor, and geography.

Williams' early work spoke clearly of her upbringing in 1970s and 80s suburbia – of alienation, and the hypocrisy evident in the post-WWII middle class. On the track "Anthem" on her early tape All My Heroes Are Dead, she sang, "I know there's blood in the pavement and we've turned the fields to sand."

Williams' songs often address gender typing, roles, and inequities. "You're Aging Well" on The Honesty Room discusses adolescent body image, ageism and self-loathing in detail. The song ends with the singer finding an unnamed female mentor — "the woman of voices" — who points her toward a more enlightened and mature point of view. Joan Baez covered the song in concert and later dueted with Williams on tours.

A 2001 article in The Advocate discussed Williams' popularity among LGBT people, writing that among LGBT-supportive straight songwriters, "few manage in their lyrics to dig as deeply or as authentically as... Williams does".

"When I Was a Boy", also on The Honesty Room, uses Williams' own childhood experiences as a tomboy to muse on gender roles and how they limit boys and girls, who then become limited men and women.

"The Christians and the Pagans" on Mortal City simultaneously tackles both religion and sexual orientation through a tale of a lesbian, pagan couple that chooses to spend solstice with the devout Christian uncle of one of the women, thus creating a situation where people who would oppose each other on almost every political and cultural front try to get by on pure politeness. Throughout the song, the family members begin to discover their differences need not estrange them from one another.

In an interview in 2007 on the Food Is Not Love podcast, she said that the song "February" from Mortal City is one of her songs that she likes best. She referred to the way the song "kept on evolving into, not only what I wanted to say, but what I wanted to say and didn't even know was in there." She liked the way the song "kept on breaking its own rules in a way that art is all about."

Williams' relationship with her family is hinted at through several songs, including "After All" on The Green World. The song deals mainly with her depression at the age of twenty-one, referring to it as a "winter machine that you go through" repeatedly while "everyone else is spring-bound."

Her song "As Cool As I Am" has become part of Bryn Mawr College's traditional May Day, when the song is played during the "May Hole" celebration. The song is even called an "unofficial anthem" for the school. Williams has visited the college several times to perform at concerts.

== Discography ==
=== Albums ===
- I Have No History (1990)
- All My Heroes Are Dead (1991)
- The Honesty Room (1993)
- Mortal City (1996)
- End of the Summer (1997)
- The Green World (2000)
- Out There Live (2001)
- The Beauty of the Rain (2003)
- My Better Self (2005)
- Promised Land (2008)
- Many Great Companions (2010)
- In the Time of Gods (2012)
- Keeping Me Honest: The Honesty Room 20th Anniversary Concert Live (2014)
- Emerald (2015)
- I'll Meet You Here (2021)
- Hummingbird Highway (2025)

=== Extended plays ===
- The Christians and the Pagans (1996)
- What Do You Hear in These Sounds? (1997)
- It's Alright (2008)
- Folkadelphia Session 6/26/2015 (2016)

=== Singles ===
- "Alleluia" (1995)
- "As Cool as I Am" (1996)
- "Are You Out There" (1997)
- "Play the Greed" (1999)
- "I Won't Be Your Yoko Ono" (2000)
- "I Saw a Bird Fly Away" (2002)
- "Closer To Me" (2003)
- "Comfortably Numb" (2005)
- "Echoes" (2005)
- "The Easy Way" (2008)
- "Summer Child" (2012)
- "Hummingbird Highway" (2025)

=== Videos ===
- Live At Bearsville Theater DVD (2007)

=== As a member of Cry Cry Cry ===
- Cry Cry Cry (1998)
- Live @ the Freight (2020)

=== Contributions ===
- A Home for the Holidays (Hammer & Lace), 1997 – "What Child is This?"
- Darol Anger – Heritage (Six Degrees Records), 1997 – "While Roving on a Winter's Night" (with John Gorka)
- Hempilation 2: Free the Weed (Capricorn Records), 1998 – "Play the Greed"
- Badlands: A Tribute to Bruce Springsteen's Nebraska (Sub Pop), 2000 – "Highway Patrolman"
- Labour of Love: The Music of Nick Lowe (Telarc), 2001 – "All Men Are Liars"
- The Songs of Pete Seeger Vol.2: If I Had a Song... (Appleseed Recordings), 2001 – "Oh, Had I a Golden Thread" (with Toshi Reagon)
- Dan Zanes & Friends – Night Time! (Festival Five Records), 2002 – "Wild Mountain Thyme"
- This Bird Has Flown – A 40th Anniversary Tribute to the Beatles' Rubber Soul (Razor & Tie), 2005 – "You Won't See Me"
- Remembering Rachel: Songs of Rachel Bissex (Rachel Bissex Memorial Fund), 2005 – "Just Like That" (with Patty Larkin)
- Born to the Breed: A Tribute to Judy Collins (Wildflower Records), 2008 – "Weaver Song (Holly's Song)"
- Big League Babe: The Christine Lavin Tribute Album (Philo), 2008 – "The Kind of Love You Never Recover From" (with Hugh Blumenfeld)
- Patty Larkin - 25 (Signature Sounds), 2010 – "Good Thing"
- Sing SOS > Songs of the Spectrum (Songs of the Spectrum), 2010 – "House on Fire"

== Bibliography ==
- The Tofu Tollbooth (1994, co-author)
- Amalee (May 2004)
- Lights, Camera, Amalee (July 2006)
- What I Found in a Thousand Towns (September 2017)
- How to Write a Song That Matters (August 2022)
