= À Gogo: Live on Tour =

1999 live album by Patty Larkin

à gogo

Live album by Patty Larkin
- Released: September 28, 1999
- Recorded: 1991 – 1997
- Genre: Folk rock
- Length: 57:03
- Label: Vanguard
- Producer: Bette Warner and Patty Larkin

Patty Larkin chronology
Perishable Fruit (1997)	à gogo (1999)	Regrooving the Dream (2000)

à gogo is singer-songwriter Patty Larkin's eighth album, her second live album, and her first on her label Vanguard. Produced by Larkin and Bette Warner in 1999, it has 14 tracks.

== Track listing ==
All songs were written by Patty Larkin except "Banish Misfortune" (traditional, arr. by Richard Thompson) and "Don't Do It" (William Stevenson).

1. "Wolf at the Door"
2. "Banish Misfortune/Open Hand"
3. "Tango"
4. "Do Not Disturb"
5. "Don't"
6. "Dear Diary"
7. "I Told Him That My Dog Wouldn't Run"
8. "Booth of Glass"
9. "Who Holds Your Hand"
10. "The Book I'm Not Reading"
11. "Don't Do It"
12. "Mary Magdalene"
13. "Me and That Train"
14. "Good Thing"

== Personnel ==
- Patty Larkin – vocals and acoustic guitar
