= Step into the Light (album) =

Studio album by Patty Larkin
- Released: 1985
- Genre: Folk rock
- Length: 41 minutes
- Label: Philo
- Producer: Ben Wisch

Patty Larkin chronology
Step into the Light (1985)	I'm Fine (1987)

Step Into the Light is the debut album by American singer-songwriter Patty Larkin. Produced in 1985 and distributed by Philo Records, it contains the following songs:

== Track listing ==
1. "If I Were Made of Metal"
2. "Round and Around"
3. "It Better Be Me"
4. "Dodge Dart"
5. "Day to Day"
6. "Caffeine"
7. "Step Into The Light"
8. "Back Into Your Arms"
9. "Mainstreet"
10. "Valentine"
11. "Cupid's Knee"
12. "Not Bad for a Broad"

== Reviews ==
Of the album, reviewer George Graham wrote: "Her 1985 debut album Step into the Light introduced us to a fine artist who was musically sophisticated, an astute lyricist, and one who could also show a keen sense of humor from time to time."
