= My Better Self =

Studio album by Dar Williams
- Released: September 13, 2005
- Genre: Folk
- Length: 49:56
- Label: Razor & Tie
- Producer: Stewart Lerman

Dar Williams chronology
The Beauty of the Rain (2003)	My Better Self (2005)	Promised Land (2008)

Professional ratings
Review scores
Source	Rating
AllMusic	4.5/5 stars
Paste	3.5/5 stars

My Better Self is the sixth album by singer/songwriter Dar Williams. It was released on September 13, 2005, by Razor & Tie.

== Track listing ==
All songs written by Dar Williams, except where noted.

1. "Teen for God" – 3:28
2. "I'll Miss You Till I Meet You" – 4:27
3. "Echoes" (Jules Shear, Rob Hyman, Stewart Lerman) – 3:59
4. "Blue Light of the Flame" (Williams, Hyman) – 3:05
5. "Everybody Knows This Is Nowhere" (Neil Young) – 4:28
6. "Two Sides of the River" – 4:09
7. "Empire" – 3:47
8. "Comfortably Numb" (Roger Waters, David Gilmour) – 5:26
9. "So Close to My Heart" – 3:11
10. "Beautiful Enemy" – 3:10
11. "Liar" – 2:58
12. "You Rise and Meet the Day" – 3:06
13. "The Hudson" – 4:38

The album was released with different bonus tracks depending on the vendor. Copies bought at Borders bookstores included a live recording of "And a God Descended" and Barnes & Noble customers got a live rendition of "I Saw a Bird Fly Away".

== Personnel ==
- Dar Williams – guitar, vocals
- Sammy Merendino – percussion
- Steuart Smith – organ, acoustic guitar, piano, keyboards, guitar
- Michael Visceglia – bass, bass pedals
- Julie Wolf – organ, melodica, vox organ, Fender Rhodes, Mellotron, piano, accordion, glockenspiel, clavinet
- Neal Evans – organ, bass guitar, piano
- Alan Evans – drums
- Eric Krasno – guitar
- Ben Butler – guitar
- Ani DiFranco – guitar, vocals
- Eric Bazilian – vocals
- Steve Holley – drums, glockenspiel
- Rob Hyman – organ, Cordovox, piano, Wurlitzer
- Stewart Lerman – guitar, keyboards, production
- Patty Larkin – vocals
- Marshall Crenshaw – guitar, vocals, backing vocals
