= Regrooving the Dream =

Studio album by Patty Larkin
- Released: July 25, 2000
- Genre: Folk rock
- Length: 58:22
- Label: Vanguard
- Producer: Bette Warner and Patty Larkin

Patty Larkin chronology
A Gogo: Live on Tour (1999)	Regrooving the Dream (2000)	Red=Luck (2003)

Regrooving the Dream is singer-songwriter Patty Larkin's ninth album. Produced by Larkin and Bette Warner in 2000 and distributed by Vanguard Records, it contained the following songs:

== Track listing ==
1. "Random Play"
2. "River"
3. "Only One"
4. "Beg to Differ"
5. "Sorry"
6. "Anyway the Main Thing Is"
7. "Burnin Down"
8. "Hotel Monte Vista"
9. "Hand Full of Water"
10. "Mink Coats"
11. "Poetry of Lies"
12. "When"
13. "Just a Few Words"
14. "Lost and Found"

The song "Anyway the Main Thing Is" was used prominently in the soundtrack of the film Evolution.

All songs were written by Patty Larkin.

== Personnel ==
- Patty Larkin – vocals, acoustic guitar, electric guitar, octave mandolin, bouzouki, lap steel guitar, accordion, slide guitar, vocal loops, keyboards
- John Leventhal – electric guitars, bouzouki, lap steel guitar
- Marc Shulman – electric guitar
- Richard Gates – bass guitar
- Greg Porter – bass guitar
- Mike Rivard – bass guitar, double bass
- Cercie Miller – alto saxophone
- Tiger Okoshi – trumpet
- Gideon Freudmann – cello
- Bette Warner – harmonica
- Alan Williams – piano
- Ben Wittman – drums, rods, brushes, dumbek, percussion
- Glen Valez – hand drum
- Ghost – electric slide guitar, piano, backing vocals
- Jennifer Kimball – backing vocals
