= Strangers World =

Studio album by Patty Larkin
- Released: 1995
- Genre: Folk rock
- Length: 38:54
- Label: High Street
- Producer: John Leventhal, Patty Larkin

Patty Larkin chronology
Angels Running (1993)	Strangers World (1995)	Perishable Fruit (1997)

Strangers World (sometimes spelled Stranger's World) is the sixth album by American singer-songwriter Patty Larkin.

== Track listing ==
In the CD Jacket, next to each song title, Patty Larkin wrote brief explanations for each song:

1. "Closest Thing" (A Meditation on the Truth)
2. "Johnny Was A Pyro" (Once upon a time...)
3. "Don't" (The confusion of thinking for yourself. Oh, yeah.)
4. "Mary Magdalene" (I think I saw her coming out of the subway at Rush Hour)
5. "Open Arms (Don't Explain)" (Dedicated, with love, to my mother and father)
6. "Dear Diary" (Life is strange, but good (good, good, good).)
7. "Danny" (Written after the Labor Day nor'easter that took the lives of four fisherman from Gloucester.)
8. "Italy" (Thank you, John Gorka, for the first two lines (I'd like to go to Italy/Just to eat the food). I'll get there someday.)
9. "Me And That Train" (A True Story)
10. "When the Heavens Light Up" (Liz's song. Artist, musician, wearer of red lipstick, friend.)
11. "Carolina" (Closing Prayer)
