= Red=Luck =

Studio album by Patty Larkin
- Released: February 11, 2003
- Genre: Folk rock
- Length: 45:38
- Label: Vanguard
- Producer: Patty Larkin, Bette Warner, Ben Wittman

Patty Larkin chronology
Regrooving the Dream (2000)	Red=Luck (2003)	Watch the Sky (2008)

Red=Luck is singer-songwriter Patty Larkin's tenth album. Produced by Larkin, Bette Warner, and Ben Wittman in 2003 and distributed by Vanguard Records, it contained the following songs:

== Track listing ==
1. "All That Innocence"
2. "24/7/365"
3. "The Cranes"
4. "Children"
5. "Italian Shoes"
6. "Birmingham"
7. "Too Bad"
8. "Home"
9. "Different World"
10. "Normal"
11. "Red=Luck"
12. "Inside Your Painting"
13. "St. Augustine"
14. "Louder"

All songs were written by Patty Larkin.

== Album personnel ==
- Patty Larkin - vocals, acoustic guitar, harmonica, backing vocals
- Ben Wittman - drums
- Richard Gates - bass
- Mike Rivard - sintir
- John Hickey - electric guitar
- Marc Shulman - electric guitar
- Duke Levine - electric guitar
- Jeff Lang - slide guitar
- Seamus Egan - low flute and mandolin
- Mick McAuley - button accordion
- Winifred Horan - fiddle
- Merrie Amsterburg - backing vocals
- Jonatha Brooke - backing vocals
- Bette Warner - talking
- Tim Craven - electric guitar
- Gideon Freudmann - cello
- Jennifer Kimball - backing vocals
- Willy Porter - backing vocals, thumb piano
