= DVDplus =

The DVDplus is a dual-sided disc similar to the DualDisc. It is an optical disc storage technology that combines the technology of DVD and CD in one disc. A DVD and a CD-compatible layer are bonded together to provide a multi-format hybrid disc. DVDplus, like DualDisc, is not a new format as such: it combines two existing formats, DVD and CD, to produce a new product.

DVDplus is currently available in three variants:

1. CD / DVD
2. CD / DVD-Audio
3. DVD / ROM

These variants can be combined: for example the DVD side can contain a DVD-Video zone, a DVD-Audio zone and a ROM/file download zone, just as is the case with conventional DVDs.

It will eventually be possible to produce the DVDplus with upcoming formats, such as Blu-ray. All DVDplus formats can be played both on conventional CD players, on DVD players and on the computer (the format is compatible with approximately 99% of the players on the market).

There has been some controversy surrounding the DVDplus format as of late, as United States record labels have attempted to roll out its DualDisc format with a specification that the creators of DVDplus claim is in violation of its essential patents (but see below for the actual patent status of DVDPlus).

According to the DVDPlus website, in December 2004, Sony DADC signed a global license agreement with DVDplus International, the makers of DVDplus.

To circumvent legal wrangles, manufacturers releasing DualDiscs in Europe have generally, so far, paid a licence fee to Dierks, even though the discs they are releasing are actually DualDiscs and not DVDplus discs. This has generally been achieved by using certified DualDisc plants that are also licensed to make DVDplus discs.

It would be erroneous to think of DVDplus as 'the European equivalent of DualDisc'. Some record companies in the United States, notably Ryko, have released DVDplus products, and DualDisc is now a great deal more common in Europe (though not as common as in the USA). They are essentially two similar approaches to the same goal, although the RIAA has pointed out that DualDisc is a music medium, and not a video medium. No such nominal restriction applies to DVDplus.

Although theoretically almost identical, DVDplus discs have so far appeared in practice - despite claims to the contrary - to measure as having slightly thicker CD-compatible layers than DualDiscs (though not sufficiently thick to make them conform to CD Red Book specifications). As a result, DVDplus has been able to claim a higher level of compatibility with CD players than DualDisc (where the thinness of the CD-compatible layer has shown some incompatibilities with a few players). This also meant that there were no limitations to the CD-compatible side's playing time as was the case with early DualDiscs. However, increased overall disc thickness risks an increased likelihood of the disc getting stuck in slot-loading players and autochangers. Despite these factors, return rates for both of the dual-sided disc products as a result of either sticking or non-playability are claimed to be extremely small.

== Status of the trademark "DVDPlus" ==
DVDplus is a trademark of Dieter Dierks. A search in the trademarks database of the European Union's Office of Harmonisation of the Internal Market (OHIM) reveals that the trademark was registered in 2001.

== Patent History of DVDPlus applications ==
As the table below shows, although the company and Mr. Dierks have been successful in closing licensing agreements with various companies, DVDPlus is not actually subject to much patent protection. The only European patents granted for the DVDPlus concept have either been withdrawn, revoked or allowed to lapse. The only jurisdiction in which patent protection exists is Australia.

Type	Application number	Published as	Status date	Date	European patent register
EP application	EP03750410	EP1530792	Withdrawn	01-03-2008	
Family member of above	WO2004017316		Published		
Family member of above	WO2004017306		Published		
Family member of above	AU2003249783		Published		
Family member of above	AU2003269866		Published		
EP application	EP02776802	EP1436809	Granted/Lapsed	01-05-2008	
Family member of above	DE10150025		Published		
Family member of above	WO03034418		Published		
Family member of above	US2004246869		Published		
Family member of above	AT343204T		Published		
Family member of above	ES2275010T		Published		
EP application	EP99121839	EP1006513	Withdrawn	03-06-2008	
Family member of above	DE19950707		Published		
Family member of above	US2004196778		Published/Abandoned		
EP application	EP98907662	EP0914653	Granted/Revoked	26-01-2009	
Family member of above	WO9838637		Published		
Family member of above	AU6341598		Published		
Family member of above	JP2000509879T		Published		
Family member of above	AU729812B		Accepted	02-08-2001	
Family member of above	DE29824505U		Published		
Family member of above	AT269576T		Published		
Family member of above	PT914653E		Published		
Family member of above	ES2223124T		Published		
Family member of above	DE69824521T		Published		

== See also ==
- DualDisc
- Super Audio CD, another format that has discs that both take advantage of the higher bandwidth audio in supported machines, and are also sometimes readable in standard CD players.
