= Angels Running =

Studio album by Patty Larkin
- Released: 1993
- Genre: Folk-pop
- Length: 39:00
- Label: High Street
- Producer: Ben Wisch, John Leventhal

Patty Larkin chronology
Tango (1991)	Angels Running (1993)	Strangers World (1995)

Angels Running is an album by the American singer-songwriter Patty Larkin, released in 1993. Larkin supported the album with a North American tour.

== Production ==
The album was produced by Ben Wisch and John Leventhal. Larkin played guitar, mandolin, and accordion. "Channeling Marlene" is about Marlene Dietrich. "Video" ridicules the music business.

== Critical reception ==
Professional ratings
Review scores
Source	Rating
AllMusic	4/5 stars
Orlando Sentinel	4/5 stars
Windsor Star	B

The New York Times deemed it Larkin's best album, and praised the "smoky, slightly weatherbeaten folk-pop voice that resonates with a plucky resignation and humor." The Orlando Sentinel determined that "the album's substance generally manages to keep up with its style, which is considerable."

AllMusic wrote that "Larkin continues the good fight, penning some fantastic tunes and delivering them with a fine blend of class and humor."

== Track listing ==
1. "Who Holds Your Hand"
2. "Do Not Disturb"
3. "Good Thing (Angels Running)"
4. "Banish Misfortune/Open Hand"
5. "Might as Well Dance"
6. "Ain't That as Good"
7. "Helen"
8. "I Told Him That My Dog Wouldn't Run"
9. "Pundits and Poets"
10. "Booth of Glass"
11. "Winter Wind"
12. "Channeling Marlene"
13. "Video"

All songs were written by Patty Larkin except Banish Misfortune/Open Hand (traditional).

== Personnel ==
- Patty Larkin – vocals, guitars, mandolin, accordion
- John Leventhal – guitars, bazouki, mandolin, keyboards, percussion, backing vocals
- Michael Manring – fretless bass, bass, e bow
- Richard Gates – bass guitar
- Ben Wisch – keyboards
- Dennis McDermott – drums, percussion
- Glen Velez – percussion
- Bashiri Johnson – percussion
- Jonatha Brooke – backing vocals
- Mary Chapin Carpenter – backing vocals
- Judith Casselberry – backing vocals
- Casselberry-Du Pree – backing vocals
- Catharine David – backing vocals
- Champion Jack Dupree – backing vocals
- Jacqué Dupreé – backing vocals
- Milt Grayson – backing vocals
- Jennifer Kimball – backing vocals
- Curtis King – backing vocals
- Madeline – backing vocals
- Kenny Williams – backing vocals
