= Perishable Fruit =

Studio album by Patty Larkin
- Released: 1997
- Genre: Folk
- Length: 49:54
- Label: High Street Records
- Producer: Patty Larkin

Patty Larkin chronology
Strangers World (1995)	Perishable Fruit (1997)	à gogo: Live on Tour (1999)

Professional ratings
Review scores
Source	Rating
AllMusic	2.5/5 stars

Perishable Fruit is an album by the singer-songwriter Patty Larkin, released in 1997. It was produced by Larkin, and recorded at her home studio on Cape Cod.

== Critical reception ==
AllMusic wrote that "the love songs were idealized at best and vague at worst, and the singer rarely seemed involved in any case."

== Track listing ==
1. "The Road"
2. "The Book I'm Not Reading"
3. "Coming Up for Air"
4. "Angels Wings"
5. "You and Me"
6. "Pablo Neruda"
7. "Wolf at the Door"
8. "Brazil"
9. "Rear View Mirror"
10. "Heart"
11. "Red Accordion"

All songs were written by Patty Larkin.

== Album personnel ==
- Patty Larkin - vocals, acoustic guitar, electric guitar, mandolin, bouzouki, and various other guitars
- Jennifer Kimball - backing vocals
- Ben Wittman - lap steel percussion
- Richard Gates - fretless and fretted bass
- Marc Shulman - tiple, electric guitar, wolf electric
- Ben Wisch - backing vocals
- Jane Siberry - backing vocals
- Bette Warner - "song sculpting" and spoken word backing vocal
- Michael Manring - fretless and fretted bass, E-bow, and 10-string bass
- Gideon Freudmann - cello
- Alan Williams - Wolf-man
- Bruce Cockburn - backing vocals and acoustic guitar
