= I'll Meet You Here =

Studio album by Dar Williams
- Released: October 1, 2021
- Genre: Folk pop
- Length: 36:40
- Language: English
- Label: BMG Rights Management and Renew Records
- Producer: Larry Campbell; Stewart Lerman

Dar Williams chronology
Emerald (2015)	I'll Meet You Here (2021)	Hummingbird Highway (2025)

"It was nice to have taken so much time away and to apply what I had learned from leading these songwriting retreats, in terms of all the little jump starts you give yourself when you have a little collapse – when you’re at a fork in the road with your writing or with your confidence. It was almost like I was a student of where we had gotten in the songwriting retreat, so it was great. I had led this thing and come up with something close to a pedagogy and then I followed it and I was like, “Wow, this really works.” So that was good. If there had been a part of my brain that says, “It’s too late, you’ve lost it. You had a guardian angel, but she didn’t want you to write about urban planning, and now you will never write any more songs.” That’s all a bunch of BS. I would just put all that stuff aside and keep on writing. It was really exciting to get back in that sense, to see how my past helped my present.

—Dar Williams on taking a break from recording albums to write and host songwriting workshops.

I'll Meet You Here is a 2021 studio album by American folk musician Dar Williams. This is Williams' first studio album in six years, after a time spent writing books and giving songwriting retreats. Songwriting for the album began while touring and being inspired by reading about smalltown America; it explores themes of accepting life as it is, detaching from judgement, and being optimistic and is based on Williams' songwriting and personal history.

== Reception ==
Debra Kate Schafer of The Aquarian Weekly characterized this work as "there is no surprising moment on the record, which is beneficial in the sense that you’re not slapped in the face with something too edgy or radical, but it also means that there is no standout moment either" and continued that many individual songs are standout, but the album is not cohesive. Lyndon Bolton of No Depression called this "a compelling insight into how Dar Williams has accepted change and lives with contentment" and "her unique blend of encouragement and resilience is as much a gift to the listener as it must be for those who have been on her retreats" In a feature for Portland Press Herald, Aimsel Ponti wrote that this album displays Williams' "exemplary songwriting" and emphasized the emotional impact of “Little Town”.

== Track listing ==
All songs written by Dar Williams, except where noted.

1. "Time, Be My Friend" – 4:06
2. "You Give It All Away" – 2:47
3. "Let the Wind Blow" – 3:35
4. "Magical Thinking" – 4:08
5. "Little Town" – 3:59
6. "Berkeley" – 3:38
7. "Today and Every Day" – 3:02
8. "I Never Knew" – 3:18
9. "Sullivan Lane" (Joziah Longo) – 3:51
10. "You’re Aging Well" – 4:20

== Personnel ==
- Dar Williams – guitar, vocals
- Chris Bittner – engineering
- Ben Butler – acoustic guitar on "Let the Wind Blow", "Magical Thinking", and "Sullivan Lane", electric guitar on "Let the Wind Blow", "Magical Thinking", and "Sullivan Lane"
- Larry Campbell – acoustic guitar on "Time, Be My Friend", baritone guitar on "Time, Be My Friend", electric guitar on "Time, Be My Friend", pedal steel guitar on "Time, Be My Friend", production on "Time, Be My Friend"
- Gail Ann Dorsey – bass guitar on "Time, Be My Friend", vocals on "Time, Be My Friend"
- Alan Douches – engineering
- Dave Eggar – cello on "Little Town", "Berkeley", and "I Never Knew", arrangement
- Steve Elson – baritone saxophone on "You Give It All Away", tenor saxophone on "You Give It All Away", arrangement on "You Give It All Away"
- James Frazee – engineering
- Pete Hanlon – engineering
- Stewart Lerman – acoustic guitar on "You Give It All Away","Let the Wind Blow","Magical Thinking", and "Berkeley"; mixing on all tracks except "Time, Be My Friend"; production on all tracks except "Time, Be My Friend"
- David Mansfield – violin on "Berkeley"
- Dennis McDermott – drums on "Time, Be My Friend"
- Erik Della Penna – electric guitar on "Little Town"
- Jim Price – recording
- Bryn Roberts – Fender Rhodes, Hammond B3, keyboards, organ, piano: "You Give It All Away", "Let the Wind Blow", "Magical Thinking", "Little Town", "Berkeley", "Today and Every Day", "I Never Knew", and "Sullivan Lane"
- Steuart Smith – Fender Rhodes, acoustic guitar, electric guitar, hammer dulcimer, mandolin: "You Give It All Away", "Magical Thinking", "Berkeley", "Today and Every Day", and "Sullivan Lane"
- Paul Socolow – bass guitar on "You Give It All Away", "Let the Wind Blow", "Magical Thinking", "Berkeley", "Today and Every Day", "I Never Knew", and "Sullivan Lane"
- The Sweet Remains – vocals on "Sullivan Lane"
- Entcho Todorov – viola on "Berkeley"
- Doug Yowell – drums on "You Give It All Away", "Let the Wind Blow", "Magical Thinking", "Berkeley", "Today and Every Day", "I Never Knew", and "Sullivan Lane"

== See also ==
- 2021 in American music
- List of 2021 albums
