= Mary McCaslin =

American folk singer (1946–2022)

Mary McCaslin (December 22, 1946 – October 2, 2022) was an American folk singer who wrote, recorded, and performed contemporary folk music.

== Early life ==
McCaslin was born in Indianapolis on December 22, 1946, and was raised in Southern California.

== Career ==
McCaslin got her start in the mid-1960s at the Troubadour club, performing at its Monday Night Hoots, as the club's open-mic nights were known.

She recorded primarily for Philo Records, and traveled and performed with her husband, Arkansas folk singer Jim Ringer. Her music ranged from ballads of the old west to her own songs of the new west and modern times. She was regarded as a pioneer of open guitar tunings, and known for her distinctive vocal style. Her influences can be heard in many younger folk performers, and she set the path for future folk-pop stars Nanci Griffith and Mary Chapin Carpenter.

In 1969, she released a cover version of the Supremes’ hit “You Keep Me Hangin’ On.” According to New York Times: “transforms the tune from an urban teen-oriented lament into a mountain-flavored folk song of quiet, adult desperation.”

Her musical development was influenced by the western ballads of Marty Robbins, the guitar playing of Joan Baez and Joni Mitchell, the singing and banjo playing of Hedy West, and the vocal inflections of the Beatles and the Bee Gees. Writing of McCaslin's Way Out West LP, Robert Christgau said in Christgau's Record Guide: Rock Albums of the Seventies (1981), "Without self-dramatization—she favors plain melodies and commonplace imagery and her singing is gamely unhistrionic—this woman explores Joni Mitchell's territory with equal intelligence, more charm, and no drums."

Her songs have been recorded by Tom Russell, Bill Staines, Gretchen Peters, David Bromberg, Kate Wolf, Stan Rogers, and Còig. The Grand Canyon Railroad used her song "Last Cannonball" for its promotional television ad.

== Personal life ==
McCaslin met singer-songwriter Jim Ringer in 1972, and began performing with him. They married in 1978, and as a duo released the album The Bramble & the Rose. They moved to San Bernardino, California. McCaslin separated from him in 1989. Ringer died in 1992 after a long illness, and McCaslin provided the liner notes for a retrospective album of his songs: The Best of Jim Ringer.

McCaslin was busy with family matters for most of the 1980s, finally releasing a new album, Broken Promises, in 1994. She suffered from progressive supranuclear palsy (PSP), a rare neurological condition that can cause problems with balance, movement, vision, speech and swallowing. She died from PSP in Hemet, California on October 2, 2022, at the age of 75.

== Discography ==
- Goodnight Everybody (1969) [reissued in 1980 as Blue Ridge Epitaph but with one less track]
- Way Out West (1973)
- Prairie in the Sky (1975)
- Old Friends (1977)
- The Bramble & the Rose (1978)
- Sunny California (1979)
- A Life and Time (1981) Flying Fish Records
- The Best of Mary McCaslin (1984)
- The Best of Mary McCaslin: Things We Said Today (1992)
- Broken Promises (1994)
- Rain (1999) [recorded in 1968]
- Better Late Than Never (2006)
