= Watch the Sky =

Studio album by Patty Larkin
- Released: January 22, 2008
- Genre: Folk
- Length: 39:26
- Label: Vanguard
- Producer: Patty Larkin

Patty Larkin chronology
Red=Luck (2003)	Watch the Sky (2008)	25 (2010)

Professional ratings
Review scores
Source	Rating
AllMusic	4/5 stars
PopMatters	8/10 stars

Watch the Sky is an album by American singer-songwriter Patty Larkin. It was released by Vanguard Records on January 22, 2008.

== Track listing ==
1. "Phone Message" – 3:27
2. "Cover Me" – 3:09
3. "Hallelujah" – 4:38
4. "Beautiful" – 2:57
5. "Dear Heart" – 3:10
6. "Hollywood" – 2:26
7. "Walking In My Sleep" – 5:12
8. "All Souls Day" – 2:13
9. "Bound Brook" – 4:02
10. "Traveling Alone" – 3:19
11. "Here" – 2:34
12. "Waterside" – 2:19

All songs were written by Patty Larkin.

== Album personnel ==
- Patty Larkin – vocals, acoustic guitar, electric guitar, lap steel guitar, National guitar, baritone guitar, bass guitar, chimes, drum loops, backing vocals

== Reviews ==
- Jon Pareles, New York Times CD review, January 21, 2008
- Joan Anderman. Boston Globe online review, January 22, 2008
