= In the Time of Gods =

Studio album by Dar Williams
- Released: April 17, 2012
- Genre: Folk
- Length: 32:58
- Label: Razor & Tie
- Producer: Kevin Killen

Dar Williams chronology
Promised Land (2008)	In the Time of Gods (2012)	Emerald (2015)

Professional ratings
Review scores
Source	Rating
AllMusic	4/5 stars

In the Time of Gods is the eighth studio album by Dar Williams. It was released April 17, 2012 on Razor & Tie, the label that has released almost all of her albums.

== Track listing ==
All songs written by Dar Williams, except where noted.

1. "I Am the One Who Will Remember Everything" – 3:33
2. "This Earth" – 3:13
3. "I Have Been Around the World" (Williams, Rob Hyman) – 3:17
4. "The Light and the Sea" (Williams, Hyman) – 3:42
5. "You Will Ride with Me Tonight" – 2:41
6. "Crystal Creek" – 3:56
7. "Summer Child" (Williams, Hyman) – 3:05
8. "I Will Free Myself" (Williams, Hyman) – 3:15
9. "Write This Number Down" – 3:00
10. "Storm King" – 3:16

The album is about Greek mythology.
