= Hybrid disc =

Optical disc whose functionality varies depending on the device it is used on

A hybrid disc is a disc, such as CD-ROM or Blu-ray, which contains multiple types of data which can be used differently on different devices. These include CD-ROM music albums containing video files viewable on a personal computer, or feature film Blu-rays containing interactive content when used with a PlayStation 3 game console.

== Multiple file systems ==
A hybrid disc is an optical disc that has multiple file systems installed on it, typically ISO 9660 and HFS+ (or HFS on older discs). One reason for the hybrid format is the restrictions of ISO 9660 (filenames of only eight characters, and a maximum depth of eight directories, similar to the Microsoft FAT file system). Another key factor is that ISO 9660 does not support resource forks, which is critical to the classic Mac OS software design. Companies that released products for both MS-DOS and Classic Mac OS could release a CD containing software for both, natively readable on either system. Data files can even be shared by both partitions, while keeping the platform specific data separate. In a "true" (or "shared") hybrid HFS filesystem, files common to both the ISO 9660 and HFS partitions are stored only once, with the ISO 9660 partition pointing to file content in the HFS area (or vice versa). Blizzard Entertainment has released most of their computer games on hybrid CDs. By default, Mac OS 9 and OS X burn hybrid discs.

An ISO 9660/HFS hybrid disc has an ISO 9660 primary volume descriptor, which makes it a valid ISO 9660 disc, and an Apple partition. It may also have an Apple partition map, although this is not necessary. The ISO 9660 portion of the disc can co-exist with an Apple partition because the header areas which define the contents of the disc are located in different places. The ISO 9660 primary volume descriptor begins 32,768 bytes (32 KB) into the disc. If present, an Apple partition map begins 512 bytes into the disc; if there is no partition map, the header for an Apple HFS partition (known as a Master Directory Block, or MDB) begins 1,024 bytes into the disc.

== Audio CD with added data tracks ==
Hybrid-CD also refers to an audio CD which also includes a data track (see CD-Extra) storing MP3 (or other digital audio compression format) copy of those CD-DA tracks. Before the introduction and subsequent popularization of iTunes and the iPod, such discs were popular for sharing music on compact disc without requiring the recipient to extract and encode the CD-DA themselves — a technical and perhaps time-consuming process on older computing hardware. However, with the advent of faster computing hardware and vastly simplified automated extraction and encoding tools (e.g. iTunes, Rhythmbox, etc.) and the lack of an automated hybrid feature in that very same software, popularity of such hybrid CD has subsequently declined. However, such hybrid discs do remain in a commercial setting as a digital rights management enforcement technique, where encrypted compressed copies of the digital audio are provided with proprietary software for listening in a computer disc drive, while the CD-DA is included for playback in stand-alone CD players.

== Hybrid Blu-rays ==
In recent years, some Blu-rays have been released as Hybrid discs, demonstrating its compatibility with the PlayStation 3 console, which uses BD as its primary disc format. These discs generally include a movie or feature that can be played on any Blu-ray Disc player and playable content which is accessible when run on a PlayStation 3 console. Examples include Tekken Hybrid, Macross Frontier: Itsuwari no Utahime and Lagrange: The Flower of Rin-ne -Kamogawa Days-.

== See also ==
- Universal binary
- DualDisc
- DVDplus
- Super Audio CD
