= Still Green (album) =

Studio album by Patty Larkin
- Released: September 24, 2013
- Genre: Folk
- Length: 38:50
- Label: Signature Sounds
- Producer: Patty Larkin

Patty Larkin chronology
25 (2010)	Still Green (2013)	Bird in a Cage (2020)

Still Green is singer-songwriter Patty Larkin's thirteenth album. Released by Signature Sounds in 2013.

== Track listing ==
1. "Best of Intentions" – 3:17
2. "Down Through the Wood" – 4:11
3. "It Could Be Worse" – 4:24
4. "Soon As I'm Better" – 2:39
5. "Bon Vivants" – 3:45
6. "Green Behind the Ears" – 3:47
7. "My Baby" – 2:39
8. "Mando Drum" – 2:19
9. "New Hotel" – 1:45
10. "So Cold" – 4:46
11. "Nothing Else Really Matters" – 2:50
12. "Because of This" – 2:28
