= Tango (Patty Larkin album) =

Studio album by Patty Larkin
- Released: 1991
- Studio: Different Fur
- Genre: Folk
- Length: 46:00
- Label: High Street/Windham Hill
- Producers: Patty Larkin, Will Ackerman

Patty Larkin chronology
Live in the Square (1990)	Tango (1991)	Angels Running (1993)

Tango is an album by the American musician Patty Larkin, released in 1991. Larkin promoted the album by participating in the "On a Winter's Night" tour, with Christine Lavin and John Gorka.

== Production ==
Recorded at Different Fur, in San Francisco, the album was produced by Larkin and Will Ackerman. Larkin played a 1946 Martin D-18 guitar. Lyle Workman contributed on electric guitar.

"Metal Drums" is about a toxic waste site in Holbrook, Massachusetts. "Waiting for the Dawn" concerns South Africa. "Solo Flight" is an instrumental.

== Critical reception ==
The Washington Post wrote that "the ensemble creates delicate textures, with Larkin's percussive acoustic guitar and sandpaper-brushed near-whisper working against Michael Manring's fluid fretless bass, and Mike Marshall's mandolin."

== Track listing ==
1. "Tango"
2. "Used to Be"
3. "Upside Down"
4. "Time Was"
5. "Solo Flight"
6. "Dave's Holiday"
7. "Chained to These Lovin' Arms"
8. "Metal Drums"
9. "Letter from Vancouver"
10. "Deadlines and Dollar Signs"
11. "Waiting for the Dawn"
12. "Kathleen"
13. "Tango Reprise"

All songs were written by Patty Larkin.

== Personnel ==
- Patty Larkin – vocals, acoustic guitar
- Michael Manring – fretless bass, e bow bass
- Brian MacLeod – drums, percussion
- Richard Gates – bass
- Lyle Workman – electric guitar
- Mike Marshall – mandolin
- Darol Anger – violin
- Josef Brinckmann – accordion
- John Gorka – backup vocals on "Dave's Holiday", "Chained to These Lovin' Arms"
