= Mortal City =

Studio album by Dar Williams
- Released: January 23, 1996
- Studio: Sorcer Sound, Spa Studios and Live Wire, New York City
- Genre: Folk
- Length: 42:16
- Label: Razor & Tie
- Producer: Steven Miller

Dar Williams chronology
The Honesty Room (1993)	Mortal City (1996)	End of The Summer (1997)

Professional ratings
Review scores
Source	Rating
Allmusic	4/5 stars
Robert Christgau	(dud)

Mortal City is Dar Williams' second album, released in January 1996 by Razor & Tie.

The songs "As Cool as I Am" and "The Christians and the Pagans" were released as singles in 1996; the former was also accompanied by a music video. Unlike Williams' previous album, The Honesty Room, which was entirely acoustic, Mortal City featured electric backup on a number of the album's songs, particularly "The Ocean" and "The Blessings".

Joan Baez covered the song "February" on the album Gone from Danger.

== Track listing ==
All songs written by Dar Williams, except where noted.

1. "As Cool As I Am" – 3:35
2. "February" – 3:51
3. "Iowa (Travelling III)" – 4:46
4. "The Christians and the Pagans" – 3:03
5. "This Was Pompeii" – 3:53
6. "The Ocean" – 5:16
7. "Family" (Pierce Pettis) – 3:22
8. "The Pointless, Yet Poignant, Crisis of a Co-Ed" – 3:12
9. "The Blessings" – 3:50
10. "Southern California Wants To Be Western New York" – 4:08
11. "Mortal City" – 7:15

== Personnel ==
- Dar Williams – vocals (all tracks), guitar (2-11)
- William Galison – harmonica (1), mandolin (4)
- Larry Campbell – guitar (1,3,10), dobro (3), fiddle (7), mandolin (10)
- Mark Egan – bass (1)
- Art Baron – digeridoo (1)
- Sammy Merendino – rhythm textures (1)
- Roger Squitero – bongos (1)
- Katryna Nields – vocals (1)
- Nerissa Nields – vocals (1)
- Erik Friedlander – cello (2,11)
- Cliff Eberhardt – vocals (3)
- Lucy Kaplansky – vocals (4)
- Zev Katz – bass (4,6,9)
- Billy Ward – snare drum (4), drums (6,9)
- Mark Shulman – electric guitar (5)
- John Prine – vocals (6)
- Jeff Golub – electric guitar (6,9)
- Eileen Ivers – fiddle (6)
- Gideon Freudmann – cello (8)
- Steve Gaboury – piano (11), textures (11)
