= The Green World =

Studio album by Dar Williams
- Released: August 22, 2000
- Genre: Folk
- Length: 42:42
- Label: Razor & Tie
- Producer: Stewart Lerman

Dar Williams chronology
Cry Cry Cry (1998)	The Green World (2000)	The Beauty of the Rain (2003)

Professional ratings
Review scores
Source	Rating
Allmusic	4/5 stars

The Green World is the fourth studio album by American folk music singer-songwriter Dar Williams, released in 2000.

While writing songs for the album, Williams incorporated her ongoing interest in religion into the process. One particular inspiration was the book Drawing Down the Moon by Margot Adler.

"Calling the Moon" was covered by Richard Shindell on the album Somewhere Near Paterson.

== Track listing ==
All songs written by Dar Williams

1. "Playing to the Firmament" – 3:53
2. "And a God Descended" – 4:15
3. "After All" – 4:48
4. "What Do You Love More Than Love" – 3:17
5. "Spring Street" – 4:52
6. "We Learned the Sea" – 2:34
7. "I Won't Be Your Yoko Ono" – 3:38
8. "Calling the Moon" – 5:02
9. "I Had No Right" – 3:25
10. "It Happens Every Day" – 3:53
11. "Another Mystery" – 3:03

== Personnel ==
- Dar Williams – acoustic guitar, vocals
- Steve Holley – drums
- Rob Hyman – organ
- Graham Maby – bass guitar
- David Mansfield – violin, string arrangements
- Billy Masters – electric guitar
- Doug Plavin – percussion
- Steuart Smith – guitar, accordion, Wurlitzer, electric sitar
- Jane Scarpantoni – cello
