= Patty Larkin =

American singer-songwriter

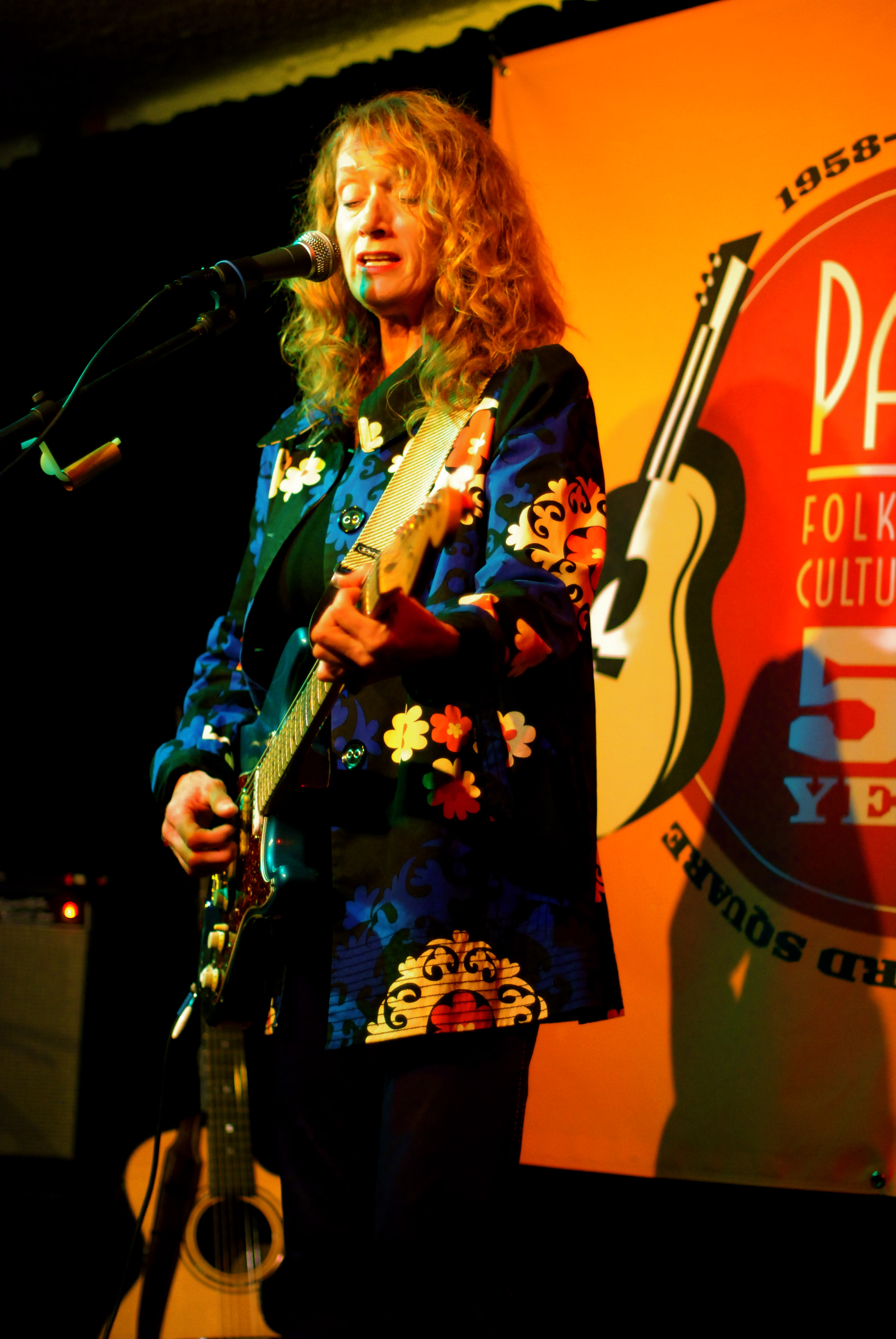
- Patty Larkin

Background information
- Born: June 19, 1951 (age 74); Des Moines, Iowa, U.S.
- Genres: Folk rock
- Occupation: Singer-songwriter
- Instruments: Vocals, guitar
- Years active: 1980s–present
- Label: Signature Sounds
- Website: pattylarkin.com

Patty Larkin (born June 19, 1951) is an American singer-songwriter and guitarist based in Boston, Massachusetts. She is a founding member of Four Bitchin' Babes. Her music has been described as folk-urban pop music.

== Life and career ==
Patty Larkin was born in Des Moines, Iowa, United States, and grew up in a musical and artistic family in Milwaukee, Wisconsin. Descended from a long line of Irish-American singers and storytellers, her mother was a painter and her sisters both musicians. She learned at a young age to appreciate the beauty and magic of the arts. She began classical piano studies at age 7, and became swept up in the sounds of pop and folk in the 1960s, teaching herself the guitar and experimenting with songwriting in high school. An English major, Larkin sang throughout her high school and college career, starting out in coffeehouses in Oregon and San Francisco. Upon graduation from the University of Oregon, she moved to Boston, Massachusetts, where she devoted herself to music, busking on the streets of Cambridge and studying jazz guitar at Berklee College of Music and with Boston area jazz guitarists.

Her recording career began in 1985 with Philo/Rounder Records where she recorded Step into The Light, I'm Fine, and Live in the Square. In 1990, she signed to Windham Hill's new High Street label and delivered four releases: Tango, Angels Running, Strangers World, and Perishable Fruit. After Windham Hill was sold to BMG, Larkin moved to Vanguard Records and released à gogo, Regrooving The Dream, Red=Luck, and Watch The Sky. The latter was a New York Times "critic choice". In 2010, Larkin celebrated her 25th year of recording with 25, a stripped down retrospective of 25 love songs with 25 featured guests (Road Narrows Records/Signature Sounds).

Larkin produced La Guitara, a compilation of international women guitarists challenging the notion that there are no great women guitarists. She has also performed on numerous compilations and her songs have been featured in the following films: "Anyway The Main Thing Is" in Evolution (Columbia/DreamWorks); "Good Thing" in Random Hearts (Columbia); and "Coming Up For Air" and "Tenderness on the Block" in Sliding Doors (Miramax/Paramount). Cher recorded Larkin's "Angels Running" on her album It's a Man's World.

Larkin is the recipient of an honorary doctorate of music degree from Berklee College of Music. She has also been honored by Boston's Mayor Thomas Menino with "Patty Larkin Appreciation Day" for her career in music and philanthropic contributions.

== Personal life ==
She currently lives with her partner and two adopted children in Wellfleet, Massachusetts.

== Discography ==
Date	Title	Label	Charted	Country	Catalog Number
Album
1985	Step into the Light	Philo Records	–	–	1103
1987	I'm Fine	Philo Records	–	–	1115
1990	Live in the Square	Philo Records	–	–	1136
1991	Tango	High Street Records	–	–	10312
1993	Angels Running	High Street Records	–	–	10318
1995	Strangers World	High Street Records	–	–	10335
1997	Perishable Fruit	High Street Records	–	–	10354
1999	À Gogo: Live on Tour	Vanguard Records	–	–	79547
2000	Regrooving the Dream	Vanguard Records	–	–	79552
2003	Red=Luck	Vanguard Records	38; Billboard Top Independent Albums	US	79727
2008	Watch the Sky	Vanguard Records	–	–	79851
2010	25	Signature Sounds	–	–	2028
2013	Still Green	Signature Sounds	–	–	2057
2020	Bird in a Cage	Road Narrows Records		US	
Collaborations
1991	Buy Me Bring Me Take Me: Don't Mess My Hair!!! (with Four Bitchin' Babes)	Philo Records	–	–	1141
2005	La Guitara: Gender Bending Strings	Vanguard Records	–	–	79796
