= The Beauty of the Rain =

Studio album by Dar Williams
- Released: 2003
- Genre: Folk
- Length: 37:27
- Label: Razor & Tie
- Producer: Stewart Lerman, Rob Hyman

Dar Williams chronology
The Green World (2000)	The Beauty of the Rain (2003)	My Better Self (2005)

Professional ratings
Review scores
Source	Rating
Allmusic	link
Blender	link
Rolling Stone	link

The Beauty of the Rain is the fifth studio album by Dar Williams.

== Track listing ==
All songs written by Dar Williams, except where noted.

1. "Mercy of the Fallen" – 4:11
2. "Farewell to the Old Me" – 2:45
3. "I Saw a Bird Fly Away" – 2:51
4. "The Beauty of the Rain" – 3:00
5. "The World's Not Falling Apart" – 4:24
6. "The One Who Knows" – 3:47
7. "Closer to Me" (Williams, Rob Hyman) – 3:42
8. "Fishing in the Morning" – 2:38
9. "Whispering Pines" (Richard Manuel, Robbie Robertson) – 4:00
10. "Your Fire Your Soul" – 3:04
11. "I Have Lost My Dreams" – 3:05

== Personnel ==
- Dar Williams – guitar, vocals
- Eric Bazilian – guitar, mandolin
- Chris Botti – trumpet
- Cliff Eberhardt – vocals
- Béla Fleck – banjo
- Steve Holley – drums
- Rob Hyman – piano, Hammond organ, production, Wurlitzer, melodica, keyboards, Reed organ
- Stewart Lerman – bass guitar, guitar, keyboards, engineering, production
- Michael Kang – violin
- Alison Krauss – vocals
- Stefan Lessard – bass guitar
- David Mansfield – violin
- John Medeski – piano, clavinet, Hammond organ
- Sammy Merendino – drums
- John Popper – harmonica, vocals
- Steuart Smith – guitar, 12-string guitar, e-bow, piano, Hammond organ, harmonica
- Paul Sokolow – bass guitar
- Carol Steele – percussion
- William Wittman – bass guitar, engineering, mixing
