= Philo Records (folk) =

- Parent company: Concord Music
- Founded: 1973; 53 years ago
- Founder: Michael Couture; Bill Schubart
- Distributor: Rounder Records
- Genre: Folk; traditional music
- Country of origin: U.S.
- Location: Ferrisburgh, Vermont

Philo Records was founded in 1973 by half-brothers Michael Couture and Bill Schubart to record and distribute folk and traditional music. Over the course of its nine-year history, before its sale to Rounder Records in 1982, Philo produced roughly 100 albums of folk, traditional, and later, jazz, world, and new music from a converted barn-studio in North Ferrisburg, Vermont. Philo's allure to many established and emerging artists was its policy of giving them full control over their productions and repertoire.

== Early years ==
Philo Records (as distinct from the Philo Records founded in California in 1945 by Eddie, Leo and Ira Messner, a jazz and R&B label) was founded in 1973 in a barn in North Ferrisburg, Vermont by half-brothers Bill Schubart and Michael Couture. The two brothers shared a love of eclectic music and Couture was himself a performing musician, while Schubart had long dabbled in recording various folk and classical groups. Schubart bought a vacant dairy barn on eight acres in 1969 that had been recently used to raise pigs, steam-cleaned it and elicited the help of an architect friend, Arthur Norcross, to create a home recording studio. The studio opened as Earth Audio Techniques in 1972. Schubart and Couture founded Philo Records to produce and distribute some of the music they had recorded at Earth Audio.

The first two releases in 1973 were Philo 1000 The UVM Choral Union performing The Psalmody and Fuguing tunes of Justin Morgan (of Morgan Horse fame) and Philo 2000 Louis Beaudoin, the soon to become renowned French-Canadian fiddler. These two releases loosely defined the 1000 series of more popular releases and the 2000 series that was more strictly roots or traditional music. In 1979, the 9000 series was added to include jazz, world and new music releases.

Philo’s aesthetic hallmark was its artist-centered culture. The prevailing industry employment of sA&R (artists & repertoire) executives who choose material, hire arrangers and sidemen, and then oversee the production of market-ready music was never adopted at Philo. Schubart and Couture chose musicians, not for only their renown, but for their ability to perform live outside the studio. They often opted to record unknown artists whose work they respected and gave them full control over their own production and choice of sidemen. Their goal was to capture on LP the artist’s own vision of their music. There was no prescribed company vision. This, of course, cut both ways. The company produced a number of releases that received significant critical acclaim but sold only a few hundred copies. It also led to considerable success and the debut of a number of new faces in the folk, traditional and, later, new music fields such as: Tom Mitchell, Kilimanjaro, Mary McCaslin and Jim Ringer

== Engineers ==
Resident engineers included co-founders Michael Couture and Bill Schubart, and also Chas Eller and David Green. Gregg Lamping served as the technical engineer.

== Artists ==
Philo’s better known artists included Mary McCaslin, Jim Ringer, Jean Carignan (Canada), Dave van Ronk, Rosalie Sorrels, Jean Redpath, The Boys of the Lough, Utah Phillips, The New Black Eagle Jazz Band, Bill Staines, Kilimanjaro, Patty Larkin, Martin Grosswendt, and Nanci Griffith.

== Bought by Rounder Records ==
In 1979, the music industry suffered major losses from piracy and the collapse of the two-tier distribution system. In that year, Philo saw two of its major distributors fail and the significant loss of receivables triggered a chapter 11 filing under which Philo sought bankruptcy protection. The label limped along for two and a half more years continuing to pay down its debts and then sold itself to Rounder Records which assumed the label name and catalog of artists. Rounder proved to be a good steward, keeping many of the albums available and converting many to the then-new CD format. Rounder added other well-known artists to the roster including: Ray Wylie Hubbard, Ellis Paul, Bill Morrissey, Iris Dement, Carrie Newcomer, Christine Lavin, Vance Gilbert and Cliff Eberhardt. In the continuing consolidation of a collapsing music media industry, Rounder itself was sold to Concord Music Group in April 2010.

== Master List / Discography ==
Philo PHEP 001 The Decentz: Get In Trouble
Philo PHEP 002 Christine Lavin: Another Woman’s Man
Philo 01DT Mary McCaslin & Jim Ringer: Live at the Bottom Line

Philo 1000 Vermont Harmony I: UVM Choral Union, arr. Dr. James Chapman (1973)
Philo 1001 Margaret MacArthur: The Old Songs
Philo 1002 Craig Morton: Them Liverpool Judies (1973)
Philo 1003 Jim Brewer, 1974
Philo 1004 Utah Phillips: Good Though (1973)
Philo 1005 Owen McBride, 1973
Philo 1006 10th Annual Old Time Fiddlers Conference at Craftsbury (1973)
Philo 1007 Lazy Bill Lucas, 1974
Philo 1008 Kenny Hall, 1974
Philo 1009 Ray Wylie Hubbard: Crusdaes of the Restless Knight
Philo 1010 Eric & Martha Nagler (w/ Evelyne Beers): Gentleness in Living (1973)
Philo 1011 Mary McCaslin: Way Out West (1973)
Philo 1012 Jim Ringer: Good to Get Home (1974)
Philo 1013 Billy Vanaver and Livia Drapkin: Landfall 2
Philo 1014 Priscilla Herdman: The Water Lily
Philo 1015 Bodie Wagner: Hobo (1975)
Philo 1016 Utah Phillips: El Capitan (1975)
Philo 1017 Glenn Ohrlin: Cowboy Songs
Philo 1018 Vermont Harmony II
Philo 1019 The Music of Rev. Baybie Hoover & Virginia Brown
Philo 1020 Sara Cleveland (1975)
Philo 1021 Jim Ringer: Any Old Wind (1974)
Philo 1022 Ted Ashlaw: Adirondack Woods Singer
Philo 1023 Jay Ungar & Lyndon Hardy - Jay & Lyn: Songs, Ballads & Fiddle Tunes
Philo 1024 Mary McCaslin: Prairie in the Sky (1975)
Philo 1026 The Boys of the Lough: Live at Passim (1975)
Philo 1027 Tom Mitchell (1976)
Philo 1028 Various - National Folk Festival: Good Time Music
Philo 1029 Rosalie Sorrels: Always A Lady
Philo 1030 Fred Holstein: Chicago & Other Ports (1977)
Philo 1031 Boys of the Lough: Lochaber No More (1976)
Philo 1032 Lew London: Swingtime In Springtime
Philo 1033 Rosalie Sorrels: Moments of Happiness (1976–77)
Philo 1034 Doris Abrahams: Labor of Love (1976)
Philo 1036 Dave van Ronk: Sunday Street
Philo 1037 Jean Redpath: The Songs of Robert Burns Vol. I, arr. Serge Hovey (1976)
Philo 1038 VT Choral Union: Vermont Harmony II, cond. Dr. James Chapman (1976)
Philo 1040 Jay Ungar and Lyn Hardy: Catskill Mountain Goose Chase
Philo 1041 Martin Grosswendt: Dog on a Dance Floor (1979)
Philo 1042 Boys of the Lough: The Piper’s Broken Finger
Philo 1044 Bill Lucas
Philo 1045 John Lutz: Midnight And Dawn
Philo 1046 Mary McCaslin: Old Friends (1977)
Philo 1047 Jim Ringer: Tramps & Hawkers (1977)
Philo 1048 Jean Redpath: Songs of Robert Burns Vol. II, arr. Serge Hovey (1980)
Philo 1049 Rosalie Sorrels: Travelin’ Lady Rides Again
Philo 1050 Utah Phillips: The Telling Takes Me Home (1976)
Philo 1051 The Boys of the Lough: Good Friends — Good Music
Philo 1052 Eric von Schmidt: Champagne Don’t Hurt Me Baby
Philo 1053 Huxtable, Christensen & Hood: Wallflowers (1980)
Philo 1054 Jean Redpath: Song of the Seals (1978)
Philo 1055 Jim Ringer & Mary McCaslin: The Bramble and the Rose
Philo 1056 Do’a: Light Upon Light (1978)
Philo 1058 Winnie Winston: Steel Wool
Philo 1061 Jean Redpath: Father Adam
Philo 1062 VT Choral Union: An Early New England Christmas (1978)
Philo 1065 Dave van Ronk: Somebody Else, Not Me (1980)
Philo 1066 Jean Redpath: Lowlands
Philo 1067 Mary McCaslin: No Deposit, No Return (1975)
Philo 1068 Jean Redpath, Lisa Neustadt & The Angel Band: Shout for Joy
Philo 1069 Lilianne Labbé and Don Hinkley: Un Canadien Errant - French Music In The North American Tradition (1986)
Philo 1070 Mason Daring & Jeanie Stahl: Heartbreak
Philo 1071 Jean Redpath: The Songs of Robert Burns Vol. III arr. Serge Hovey
Philo 1072 Jean Redpath: The Songs of Robert Burns Vol. IV arr by Serge Hovey
Philo 1073 The University Of Vermont Choral Union: Vermont Harmony III (1985)
Philo 1074 Ferron: Testimony (1981 reissue, originally released on Lucy in 1980)
Philo 1075 Mary McCaslin: the Best of… (1981)
Philo 1076 Utah Phillips: We Have Fed You All A Thousand Years (1983)
Philo 1077 Lui Collins: Baptism of Fire (1981)
Philo 1078 Robert J. Lurtsema: Christmas Stories
Philo 1079 Bill Staines: Rodeo Rose (1981)
Philo 1080 The Best of Mary McCaslin: Things We Said Today
Philo 1081 Lui Collins: Made in New England, which
Philo 1082 Jean Redpath w Abby Newton: Haydn Scottish Songs
Philo 1083 Ellis Paul: Live
Philo 1084 Laurie Spiegel: Expanding Universe
Philo 1085 Cheryl Wheeler: Live and Otherwise
Philo 1086 The New Black Eagle Jazz Band: At Symphony Hall (1982)
Philo 1087 Jean Redpath: Lady Nairne
Philo 1088 Utah Phillips: Good Though!
Philo 1089 Jim Fitzgerald: Jim Fitzgerald Sings the Quiet Place
Philo PHC 1091 Jim Ringer & Mary McCaslin: Bramble and the Rose (1978)
Philo 1092 Jon Gailmor: Dirt!
Philo 1093 Jean Redpath : The Songs of Robert Burns Vol. V, arr. Serge Hovey (1983-4)
Philo 1096 Nanci Griffith: Once in a Very Blue Moon
Philo 1097 Nanci Griffith: There’s a Light Beyond These Woods
Philo 1099 Mary McCaslin: Sunny California (Leased to Mercury as SRM-1-3772 Produced by Philo)
Philo 1103 Patty Larkin: Step Into the Light (1985)
Philo 1104 Christine Lavin: Future Fossils
Philo 1109 Nanci Griffith: Last of the True Believers (1986)
Philo 1110 Jean Redpath: A Fine Song for Singing
Philo 1111 Hugh Moffatt: Loving You
Philo 1112 Magpie: If It Ain't Love
Philo 1113 Spirit of the West: Tripping Up the Stairs
Philo 1114 Jean Redpath: The Songs of Robert Burns Vol. VI, arr. Serge Hovey
Philo 1115 Patty Larkin: I’m Fine
Philo 1116 Tom Russell Band: Road to Bayamon
Philo 1117 David Olney: Deeper Well
Philo PH 1118 Bill Staines: Redbird's Wing (1987)
Philo 1124 Maura O’Connell: Just in Time (1988)
Philo 1126 Jean Redpath: The Songs of Robert Burns Vol. VII, arr. Serge Hovey
Philo 1131 Jean Redpath: Leaving the Land (1990)
Philo 1132 Christine Lavin: Attainable Love
Philo 1133 Katy Moffatt: Child Bride
Philo 1134 Bill Staines: Tracks And Trails
Philo 1135 Tony Bird: Sorry Africa
Philo 1136 Patty Larkin: Live in the Square
Philo 1153 Sharon Shannon
Philo 1156 Vance Gilbert: Edgewise
Philo 1171 Disappear Fear (1994)
Philo 1172 Disappear Fear: Live at the Bottom Line (1995)
Philo 1173 Disappear Fear: Deep Soul Diver (1990)
Philo 1174 Diane Zeigler: Sting of the Honeybee
Philo 1175 Kristina Olsen: Hurry on Home
Philo 1176 Carol Noonan: Absolution
Philo 1177 David Olney: High, Wide And Lonesome
Philo 1178 The Burns Sisters Band: Close To Home
Philo 1179 Kimberly M'Carver: Inherited Road
Philo 1180 Disappear Fear: Seed in the Sahara (1996)
Philo 1186 Vance Gilbert: Fugitives
Philo 1206 Ray Wylie Hubbard: Dangerous Spirits
Philo 1207 SONia: Almost Chocolate
Philo 1208 The Burns Sisters Band: Tradition: Holiday Songs Old & New (1996)
Philo 1209 Carol Noonan Band: The Only Witness
Philo 1210 Utah Phillips: The Telling Takes Me Home (1997)
Philo 1211 The Kennedys: Angel Fire
Philo 1212 Cheryl Wheeler: Sylvia Hotel
Philo 1213 Vance Gilbert: Shaking Off Gravity
Philo 1214 John Forster: Helium
Philo 1215 Lynn Miles: Night In A Strange Town
Philo 1216 Bill Morrissey: Songs of Mississippi John Hurt
Philo 1217 Garnet Rogers and Archie Fisher: Home Is Where the Music Is
Philo 1218 Ray Wylie Hubbard: Crusades of the Restless Knights
Philo 1219 Lynn Miles: Slightly Haunted
Philo 1221 Jean Redpath: Father Adam
Philo 1222 Ray Wylie Hubbard: Eternal & Lowdown (2001)
Philo 1247 Carrie Newcomer: Regulars and Refugees

Philo 9000 Do’a Ornament of Hope (digital)
Philo 9001 Kilimanjaro (1980)
Philo 9002 Lar Duggan: The Lake Studies (1980)
Philo 9003 Laurie Spiegel: The Expanding Universe (1977)
Philo 9004 Do’a: Ancient Beauty (1981)
Philo 9005 Kilimanjaro II
Philo 9006 Ancient Future
Philo 9007 Tony Vacca & Tim Moran w Don Cherry: City Spirits (1985)
Philo 9008 Elements with Mark Egan and Danny Gottlieb
Philo 9009 Do’a: Companions of the Crimson Ark
Philo 9011 Elements (Mark Egan, Danny Gottlieb, Clifford Carter, Bill Evans)
Philo 9012 Lorraine Duisit and Tom Espinola: Feather River (1988)

Philo 2000 Louis Beaudoin, 1973
Philo 2001 Jean Carignan, 1973
Philo 2002 Henri Landry
Philo 2003 Philippe Bruneau, 1973
Philo 2004 Joe Heaney: Come All Ye Gallant Irishmen
Philo 2005 John McGreevy and Seamus Cooley (1974)
Philo 2006 Philippe Bruneau: Danses pour veillées canadiennes
Philo 2007 La Famille Verret = The Verret Family – Volume One : Jules Verret
Philo 2008 Joe Heaney
Philo 2009 Collection Québécoise
Philo 2012 Jean Carignan: Rend Hommage À Joseph Allard
Philo 2013 La Bolduc
Philo 2014 Jean d’Arc Charlebois (1975)
Philo 2015 Jean Redpath
Philo 2017 Eric Sahlström & Gösta Sandström: Fiddle Music From Uppland, Volume 1
Philo 2018 Jean Carignan: Plays the Music of Coleman, Morrison & Skinner
Philo 2019 The Silver Bow: Shetland Folk Fiddling
Philo 2022 La Famille Beaudoin = The Beaudoin Family

Philo 11671-1220-2 Christine Lavin: The Bellevue Years
Philo 11671-1225-2 Slaid Cleaves: Broke Down
Philo 11671-1239-2 Ellis Paul & Vance Gilbert: Side Of The Road
Philo 11671-1244-2 Ray Wylie Hubbard: Delirium Tremolos (2005)
Philo 11671-1245-2 Betty's Diner: The Best Of Carrie Newcomer
Philo 11671-1246-2 Ellis Paul: American Jukebox Fables

Philo 41067 Hans W. Brimi, Mary Barthelemy, and Jon Faukstad: Norwegian Folk Music (Fiddle, Flute, and Accordion)
Philo 41069 Lilianne Labbé and Don Hinkley: Un Canadien Errant - French Music In The North American Tradition (1980)

Fretless 101 The Campbell Family: Champion Fiddlers (1971)
Fretless 102 Burt Porter And Tom Azarian
Fretless 103 Clem Myers: Northeast Regional Oldtime Fiddle Champion 1967 & 1970
Fretless 104 Joe Robertson: square dance caller (1973)
Fretless 105 Harry Stark and Dave Farr: Old Time Fiddling
Fretless 106 Debby McClatchy: Homemade Goodies
Fretless 107 Joe Robertson: Joe Robertson Volume Two (1974)
Fretless 108 Charles Brauer: Blue Sky & Scraped Knuckles (1974)
Fretless 109 Banjo Dan and the Mid-Nite Plowboys: Snowfall (1975)
Fretless 110 Richard Johnson: Plum Island (1974)
Fretless 111 Bill Russell: From Old Leaves (1975)
Fretless 112 John Nutting: Songs of Lamoille County, Vermont (1975)
Fretless 113 Calliope's Children: Harvest
Fretless 114 Papa John Kolstad & Wildman Turk: Beans Taste Fine
Fretless 115 Peter & John Isaacson
Fretless 116 Bob Franke: Love Can’t Be Bitter All the Time
Fretless 117 Danny & Judy Rose-Redwood: Homecoming (1975)
Fretless 118 Marie Rhines: The Reconciliation (1976)
Fretless 119 Rodney & Randy Miller: Castles in the Air (1975)
Fretless 120 Gilby Hager (1975)
Fretless 121 Joan Crane: Dirt Pusher Blues (1976)
Fretless 122 Various: Oldtime Fiddling, Volume 10 (1976)
Fretless 123 John Stanfield: Carolina
Fretless 124 Pine Island: Live Inside
Fretless 125 Ed Snodderly: Sidewalk Shoes (1977)
Fretless 126 Burt Porter: Living Just The Same
Fretless 127 John Perrault: Thief in the Night
Fretless 128 Susan Joy: Like A Bird
Fretless 129 Banjo Dan And The Mid-Nite Plowboys: High Time (1977)
Fretless 130 Rep. Danny Gore: Rep. Danny Gore's Borderline Material
Fretless 131 Dave Griffiths: Pigeons On My Brain
Fretless 132 Ron West: Vermont Fiddler
Fretless 133 Tom Church: Mixed Emotions
Fretless FR 134 Lui Collins: Made in New England (1978)
Fretless 135 Juan De La Sierra: España
Fretless 136 Arm & Hammer String Band: Stay On the Farm
Fretless 137 Downpour: Flyaway
Fretless 138: Jean Redpath, Lisa Neustadt, & the Angel Band: Angels Hovering Round
Fretless 139 Meg Davis: Captain Jack & The Mermaid
Fretless 140 The North Fork Rounders: Gee Ain't It Grand
Fretless 141 The Bluestein Family: The Bluestein Family Album Sowin' On The Mountain (1972)
Fretless 142 Molly Scott and Sumitra: Honor The Earth
Fretless 143 Jon Gailmor: Gonna Die With A Smile If It Kills Me
Fretless 144 The Double Decker String Band: Giddyap Napoleon (1980)
Fretless 145 Alan Kelly: Greatest Hits, Vol. 11
Fretless 146 The Fly By Night String Band (1980)
Fretless 153 County Down
Fretless 154 Jean Redpath, Lisa Neustadt, & the Angel Band: Anywhere is Home
Fretless 155 Gordon Stone: Scratchin' The Surface
Fretless 156 The Bluestein Family: Let The Dove Come In (1981)
Fretless 160 The Double Decker String Band: Sentimental Songs And Old Time Melodies
Fretless 165: County Down: Living in the Country

Fretless 200a Yankee Ingenuity: Kitchen Junket (1977)
Fretless 200b Yankee Ingenuity: Kitchen Junket (1978)
Fretless 201 Jerry Robichaud: Maritime Dance Party
Fretless 202 Sandy Bradley Featuring Various: Potluck and Dance Tonite!
Fretless 203 Rodney & Randy Miller, George Wilson, Sandy Brady, and Steve Woodruff: New England Chestnuts

Fretless 501 The John Cassel Band: Blown Away In The Country
Fretless 503 Dan Gillmore, Doug McClaran, and Frank Williams: Road Apple and Beyond (1977)

Fretless 5000: Dan Gillmore and Doug McClaran: Road Apple (1974)
