= The Nields =

American folk-rock band

The Nields is a folk-rock band that started in 1991. As a five-piece band, they toured much of the United States, performing with artists such as Dar Williams, Moxy Früvous, 10,000 Maniacs, Ani DiFranco and Catie Curtis and appeared at many folk festivals. Two members, Katryna and Nerissa Nields, continue to tour as a folk duo. Full band performances still occur from time to time.

== History of the band ==
The first incarnation of what would later become the Nields came together in 1987 in McLean, Virginia, when Nerissa Nields met David Jones, and started a band with Nerissa's sister Katryna.

In 1991, Katryna had graduated from Trinity College in Connecticut, and Nerissa had graduated from Yale University. Nerissa married David, who was now known as David Nields, having taken her surname. By now, the threesome was performing together as the Nields, with Katryna as the lead singer, Nerissa playing rhythm guitar and singing harmony, and David Nields on lead guitar. In 1992, the three of them moved to Connecticut, where David had accepted a job at the Loomis Chaffee School, and the band recorded its first album, the self-released 66 Hoxsey Street, named for a house in Williamstown where they had lived. The band began to tour New England in earnest, earning a reputation in the regional folk music scene. In 1993, they released a live album titled Live at the Iron Horse Music Hall, recorded at the folk club in Northampton, Massachusetts.

In 1994 the band grew from a three-piece folk group to a five-piece rock band. The new members were Dave Chalfant (bass), whom Katryna had met in college, and Dave Hower (drums), a friend of Chalfant's. Chalfant also produced the band's album released that year, Bob on the Ceiling. This album featured a mix of the acoustic material that the Nields had previously specialized in and a more rock-oriented sound that would become their trademark. With their new sound, the Nields received critical acclaim, and quit their day jobs to become full-time musicians.

Their 1995 EP Abigail, named for Katryna and Nerissa's sister, was self-released, followed by Gotta Get Over Greta in 1996 on the independent Razor & Tie record label. The album was re-released in 1997 with three bonus tracks on Guardian, a division of Elektra Records.

The group suffered a number of setbacks the next year. Guardian folded, leaving them without a record label, and their tour van was growing increasingly unreliable. The band self-released an album called Mousse (the nickname for Dave Chalfant's sister Andromache) and held a special fundraising concert entitled "Jam for the Van." As a result, the Nields were able to purchase a new van, and were also able to secure a new label, Zoë, a division of Rounder Records. Over the next three years, the Nields released two more records (Play and If You Lived Here You'd Be Home Now), and in 1999 Katryna Nields and Dave Chalfant got married.

Although the band enjoyed a moderate degree of success, they ceased touring as a five-piece in 2001. Their final recording with David Nields was a two-disc album titled Live From Northampton. Like their 1993 album, it was recorded at the Iron Horse, and was self-released by the band. In 2002, David and Nerissa Nields were divorced.

== Katryna and Nerissa Nields as a duo ==
In 1998, Katryna and Nerissa were invited to play Lilith Fair as a duo. The performances were successful, and the two sisters performed several more shows together in areas where the full band had not previously been able to tour. Dar Williams dubbed this the "probe effect," a reference to Star Trek's Enterprise sending a probe to unexplored areas.

By 2001, shows by the full band were increasingly rare, as Katryna and Nerissa toured mostly by themselves. In mid-2001, Katryna took some time off to have a baby, Amelia. Afterwards, she and Nerissa recorded their first album as a duo, titled Love and China, followed by an EP of children's songs, Songs for Amelia. In 2004, they released their second full album, This Town is Wrong. In 2005, Nerissa's young adult novel, Plastic Angel, was published by Scholastic Books. This Town Is Wrong was intended as a soundtrack to the novel, which came packaged with a CD containing the songs "This Town Is Wrong" and "Glow-In-The-Dark Plastic Angel" from the album.

== Current status ==
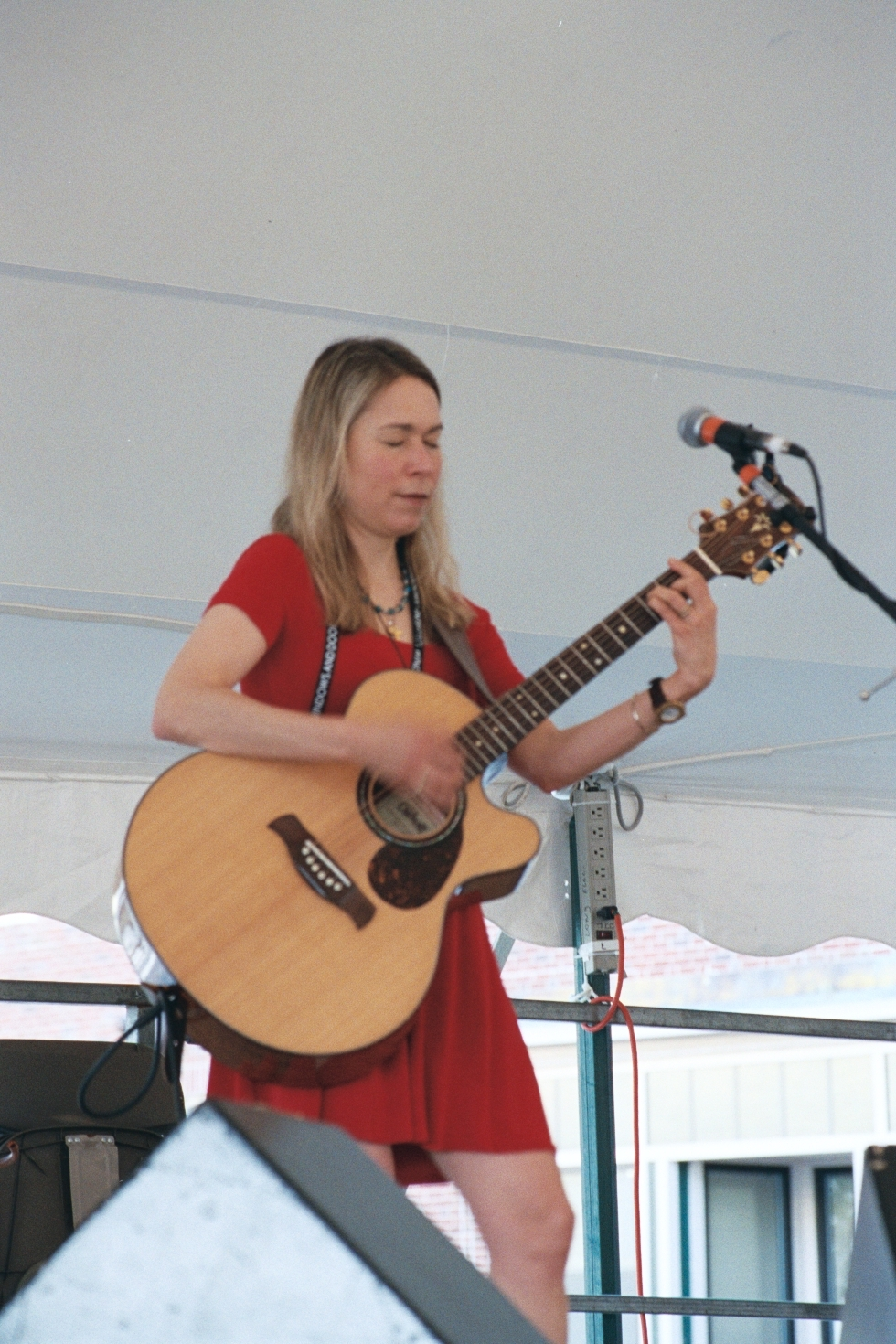
Nerissa Nields performing in 2005

Katryna and Nerissa live in the Pioneer Valley of Massachusetts and continue to make music and perform together. They have continued touring as a duo, although they have occasionally performed shows as a full band. In their 'full-band' shows, they are joined by Dave Hower on drums, Paul Kochanski on bass, and Dave Chalfant on guitar. In July 2007, they released Sister Holler, an ode to the folk canon. In August 2008 they released Rock All Day Rock All Night, a double family album. In 2010, they made a family DVD called Organic Farm. In 2012, their 16th CD The Full Catastrophe came out, reflecting their recent lives as artist/mothers and the challenges of living with the myth of "having it all." They released the album XVII in 2015 and a Christmas album, Joy to the World in 2017. The single, “Tyrants Always Fall” was also released in 2017.

In addition to making music, Nerissa has been teaching guitar, leading writing workshops, and working on a second novel, titled The Big Idea. In May 2005, she married Tom Duffy, a writer. On May 3, 2006, Nerissa gave birth to her first child, Lila Mary Nields-Duffy. John Patrick Thomas Nields-Duffy followed on August 23, 2008.

In November 2004, Katryna gave birth to her second child, a son named William John Chalfant.

Katryna and Nerissa lead a popular children's singing class called Hootenanny, which draws new pre-school-aged fans to their already substantial grassroots following.

Dave Hower plays drums with a variety of bands, including Winterpills, Spanish for Hitchhiking, and The Fucking Sparklies.

Dave Chalfant has opened a recording studio and produced albums by a number of artists. He was also a teacher of Instrumental Music at the Academy at Charlemont in Charlemont, Massachusetts.

David Nields became the Theatre Director for the Imperial Centre of Arts and Sciences in Rocky Mount, North Carolina. Currently, he teaches Theater at the college level.

== Discography ==
- 66 Hoxsey Street (1992, out of print)
- Live at the Iron Horse Music Hall (1993, out of print)
- Bob on the Ceiling (1994)
- Abigail (1995, EP)
- Gotta Get Over Greta (1996, re-release 1997)
- 'Mousse (1998)
- Play (1998)
- If You Lived Here, You'd Be Home Now (2000)
- Live From Northampton (2001)
- Love and China (2001, Katryna and Nerissa Nields)
- This Town is Wrong (2004, Katryna and Nerissa Nields)
- Songs for Amelia (2004, EP, Katryna and Nerissa Nields, children's album)
- All Together Singing In The Kitchen (2006, family album)
- Sister Holler (2007)
- Rock All Day/Rock All Night (2008, family album)
- Organic Farm (2010, live DVD)
- The Full Catastrophe (2012)
- XVII (2015)
- Joy to the World (2017)
- November (2020)
- Circle of Days (2023)

== Bibliography ==
- Nields, Nerissa (2005). Plastic Angel. New York (Scholastic Books). ISBN 0-439-70913-X
- Nields, Nerissa (2008). How To Be an Adult. (Mercy House). ISBN 0-9770454-6-3
- Nields, Nerissa and Nields, Katryna (2011). All Together Singing in the Kitchen: Creative Ways to Make and Listen to Music as a Family (Shambhala/Roost Books). ISBN 978-1-59030-898-1
