= Pure John Gorka =

Windham Hill Presents: Pure John Gorka

Compilation album by John Gorka
- Released: June 27, 2006
- Recorded: 1990–1996
- Genre: Folk; Singer-songwriter
- Label: Windham Hill Records
- Producer: Dawn Atkinson

Professional ratings
Review scores
Source	Rating
Allmusic	3.5/5 stars

Pure John Gorka is a "best of" collection of John Gorka's work selected from the five albums Gorka released on the Windham Hill/High Street label between 1990 and 1996. This collection was released on June 27, 2006, by Windham Hill (now owned by Sony/BMG and distributed by Legacy Recordings) as part of a series of "Pure" albums by former Windham Hill artists; other titles cover the careers of diverse musicians such as Jim Brickman, Mark Isham, Shadowfax, Tuck & Patti, and Will Ackerman.

Gorka says he didn't know anything about this release until he got a call from the copyright department of Sony/BMG: "I called them back and said, 'I have a record coming out?' I found out the story behind it, they're putting out a series from Windham Hill artists." Dawn Atkinson, producer of two of Gorka's albums, selected the songs. "It's hard to describe as a greatest hits thing," says Gorka, "The songs were picked to make a good record upon itself. A best-of, with my favorite songs, that would not make a good record to listen to. My favorites would be too slow." Although the collection offers no new recordings to owners of Gorka's complete back catalog, others will find a few "gems" from many of his earlier albums, many of which are no longer in print. These tracks also feature many of the collaborations Gorka has enjoyed over the years. Backing vocalist include Shawn Colvin, Lucy Kaplansky, Nanci Griffith, Jennifer Kimball, and Cliff Eberhardt.

== Gorka on Windham Hill ==
After receiving much critical acclaim for his debut album, I Know for Red House Records, Will Ackerman offered Gorka a contract with High Street Records. High Street was then a new branch of Windham Hill that was to do for the singer-songwriter what Windham Hill had done for the new age musician. He released a total of five albums with Windham Hill/High Street: Land of the Bottom Line (1990), Jack's Crows (1991), Temporary Road (1992), Out of the Valley (1994), and Between Five and Seven (1996). Initially, Gorka was treated as "the darling of the label" and was able to enjoy a larger distribution of his music. Ultimately, however, Windham Hill/High Street was sold to Sony/BMG, High Street folded, and Gorka left in disappointment. Gorka was pleased to return to the smaller label, Red House Records for his subsequent recordings.

== Track listing ==
All songs written by John Gorka

1. "Looking Forward"
2. "Jack's Crows"
3. "Blue Chalk"
4. "I Saw a Stranger With Your Hair"
5. "Lightning's Blues"
6. "The Gypsy Life"
7. "Silence"
8. "Vinnie Charles Is Free"
9. "Where the Bottles Break"
10. "That's Why"
11. "Houses in the Fields"
12. "When She Kisses Me"
13. "The Ballad of Jamie Bee"
14. "I'm From New Jersey"
15. "Italian Girls"
