= Between Five and Seven =

Studio album by John Gorka
- Released: August 1996
- Studio: Paisley Park, Chanhassen, Minnesota, US
- Genre: Folk
- Length: 49:17
- Label: High Street
- Producer: John Jennings; John Gorka

John Gorka chronology
Out of the Valley (1994)	Between Five and Seven (1996)	After Yesterday (1998)

Professional ratings
Review scores
Source	Rating
Allmusic	link
Dirty Linen	(favorable)
George Grahm	(favorable) link
Sing Out!	(favorable)

Between Five and Seven is (as the name suggests) the sixth studio album by folk singer-songwriter John Gorka. It was released in August 1996. It is the last of the five albums Gorka recorded for Windham Hill/High Street Records before returning to the smaller Red House label. Gorka produced the album with John Jennings who also produced Gorka's previous record, Out of the Valley. Unlike the previous record made in Nashville, Tennessee, the recording was done at Paisley Park Studios, Chanhassen, Minnesota, and the instrumentation has been described as "more acoustic, less pop-oriented." Paisley Park is southwest of Minneapolis and is the studio designed and owned by the artist Prince.

The album includes several lyrical portraits of Gorka's misfit characters, love songs, and philosophical musings. The songs are also full of the wordplay for which Gorka has become known.

The album features an impressive array of supporting musicians. Lucy Kaplansky and Jennifer Kimball add carefully placed harmony vocals to many tracks. John Jennings also brings along several other musicians who had worked with Mary Chapin Carpenter including drummer Robbie Magruder, guitarist Dean Magraw, and pianist Jonathan Carroll. Gorka's fellow Minnesotan Peter Ostroushko sits in on mandolin. As with many of Gorkas recordings Michael Manring plays fretless bass on nearly half of the songs. The tracks alternate between two different sets of instrumentalists which varies the pace of the music. The two bass players styles are distinct enough for the listener to recognize the difference.

== Track listing ==
All songs written by John Gorka.

1. "Lightning's Blues" – 3:54
2. "Blue Chalk" – 4:41
3. "Can't Make Up My Mind" – 4:10
4. "The Mortal Groove" – 3:25
5. "My Invisible Gun" – 2:58
6. "Part of Your Own" – 3:29
7. "Two Good Reasons" – 4:07
8. "Airstream Bohemians" – 5:20
9. "Paradise, Once" – 3:09
10. "Campaign Trail" – 4:05
11. "Edgar the Party Man" – 3:27
12. "Scraping Dixie" – 6:27

== Songs ==
This is one of few John Gorka albums without explanatory liner notes which leaves Gorka's source of inspiration for these songs unknown or up to speculation.

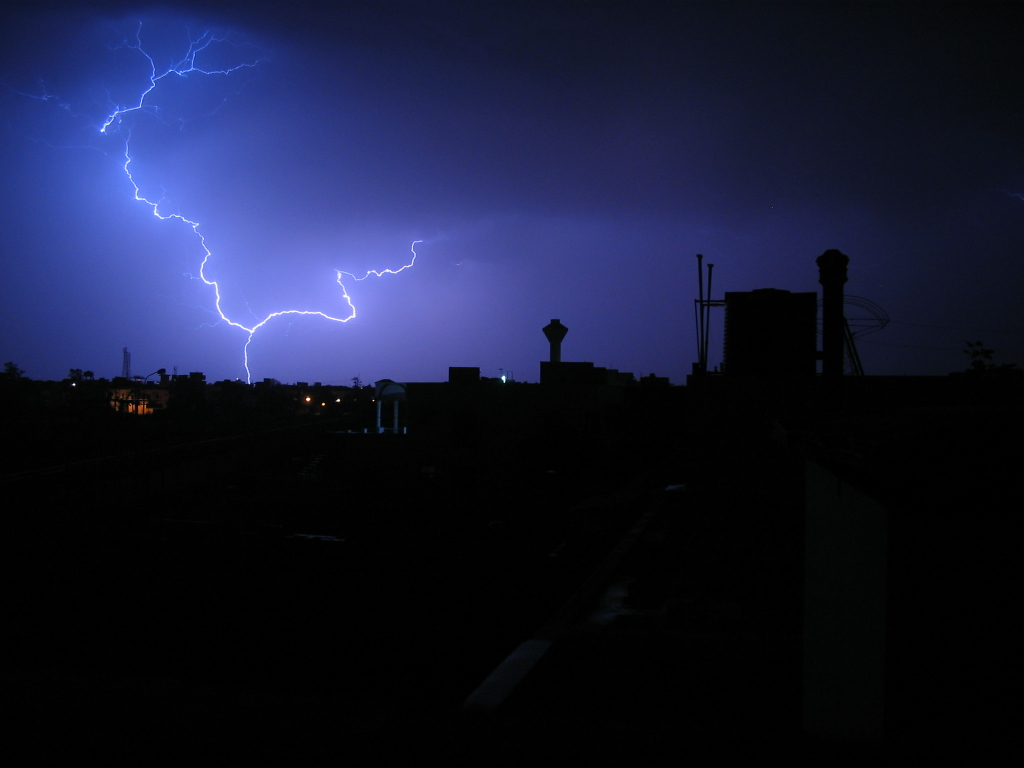
Lightning

=== Lightning's Blues ===
"Lightning's Blues" appears to be a love song written from the unusual perspective of lightning—complete with references to forest fires, Benjamin Franklin, pressure systems, and weather fronts.

Musicians:

- Robbie Magruder – drums
- J. T. Brown – bass
- Jonathan Carroll – piano
- Duke Levine – electric guitar
- John Jennings – percussion and noises
- Jennifer Kimball and Lucy Kaplansky – vocals
- John Gorka – vocal and acoustic guitar

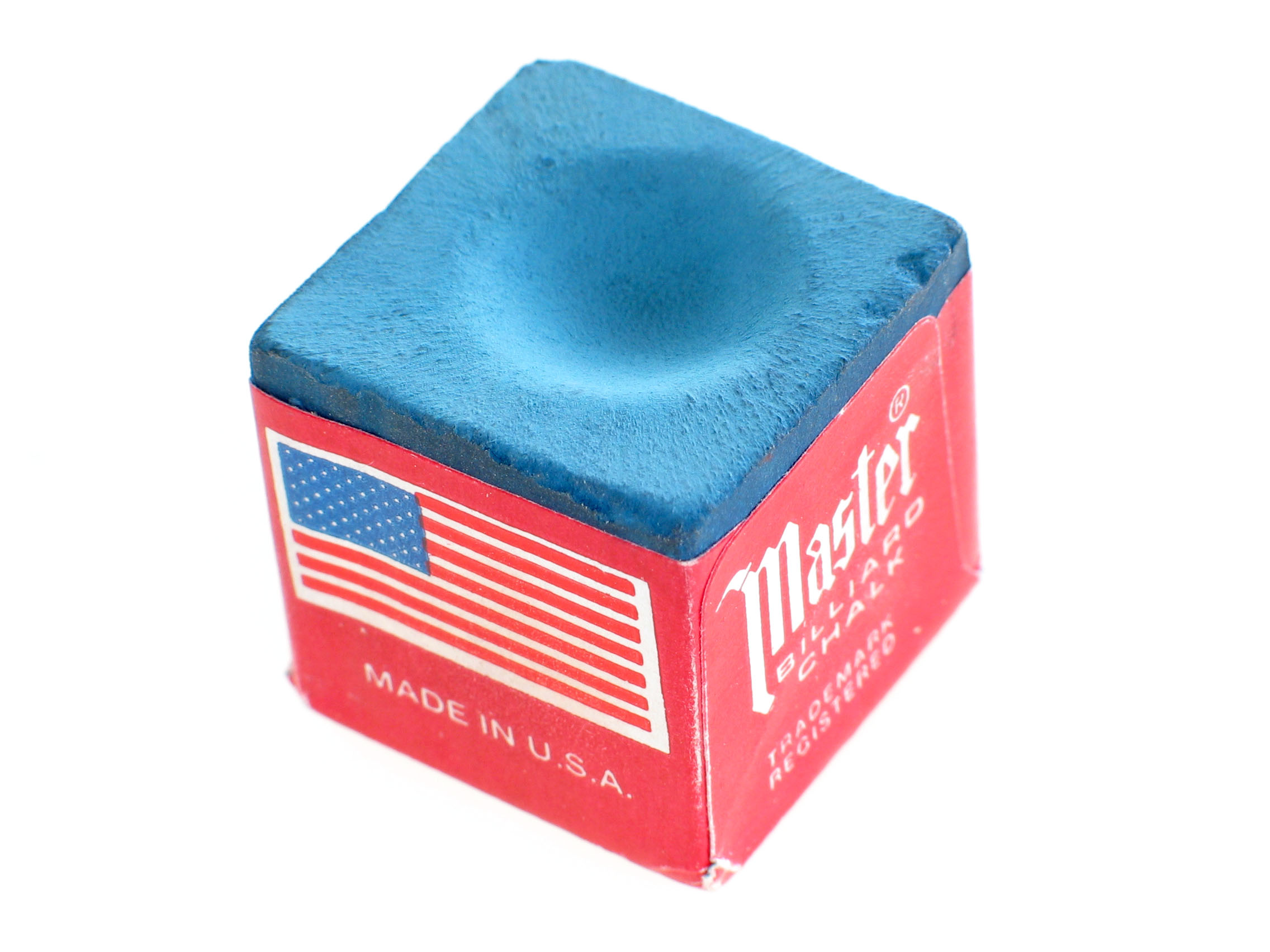
Billiard chalk

=== Blue Chalk ===
The title of "Blue Chalk" refers to the chalk used in billiards. The song introduces a pair of Gorka's characters a woman and a man. Gorka describes the male character's addiction:

He could always find the holes in the bottles
Even with a blindfold on
Never kept his seat on the wagon
Rolling off like a rolling stone

"Blue Chalk" was first recorded by Irish singer Maura O'Connell for her 1995 album, Stories. More recently it has also been recorded by the New England–based bluegrass band, Northern Lights for their 2005 album, New Moon. It has also been covered in concert performances by Lucy Kaplansky.

Musicians:

- Robbie Magruder – drums
- Michael Manring – bass
- Dean McGraw – acoustic guitar
- Peter Ostroushko – mandolin
- John Jennings – percussion
- Jennifer Kimball and Lucy Kaplansky – vocals
- John Gorka – vocal and rhythm guitar

=== Can't Make Up My Mind ===
In "Can't Make Up My Mind" Gorka creates a song about indecision through a series of paradoxical statements. Some of these are humorous in nature. For example:

I have a lot of trouble
My boss at work
Yeah I'm still self-employed
I'd better wipe that smirk

Musicians:

- Robbie Magruder – drums
- J. T. Brown – bass
- Jonathan Carroll – piano, organ, and vocals (Ooh Baby Now)
- John Jennings – the ubiquitous backpacker guitar,

tambourine & vocals

- John Gorka – 12-string guitar and vocals

=== The Mortal Groove ===
"The Mortal Groove" is one of only two tracks not to include drums. Michael Manring's fretless bass is featured as a lead instrument and is even given a solo. The late winter mood of the song is like the classic "brooding" often used to describe Gorka's earlier work. The lyrics also revisit the urban themes of blue-collar jobs and gentrification found in writing for his earlier albums such as Land of the Bottom Line and Jack's Crows.

Musicians:

- Michael Manring – bass
- Dean McGraw – acoustic guitar
- Peter Ostroushko – mandolin
- John Jennings – piano
- John Gorka – acoustic guitar and vocals

=== My Invisible Gun ===
Musicians:

- Robbie Magruder – drums
- J. T. Brown – bass
- Jonathan Carroll – piano
- Duke Levine – electric guitar
- John Jennings – backpacker guitar and percussion
- Jennifer Kimball and Lucy Kaplansky – vocals
- John Gorka – acoustic guitar and vocals

=== Part of Your Own ===
Apparently a song written for Gorka's mother.

Soloist:

- John Gorka – vocal and guitar

=== Two Good Reasons ===
"Two Good Reasons" is a love song.

Musicians:

- Robbie Magruder – drums
- Michael Manring – bass
- Dean McGraw – acoustic guitar
- Peter Ostroushko – mandolin
- John Jennings – piano and percussion
- Jennifer Kimball and Lucy Kaplansky – vocals
- John Gorka – vocal and acoustic guitar

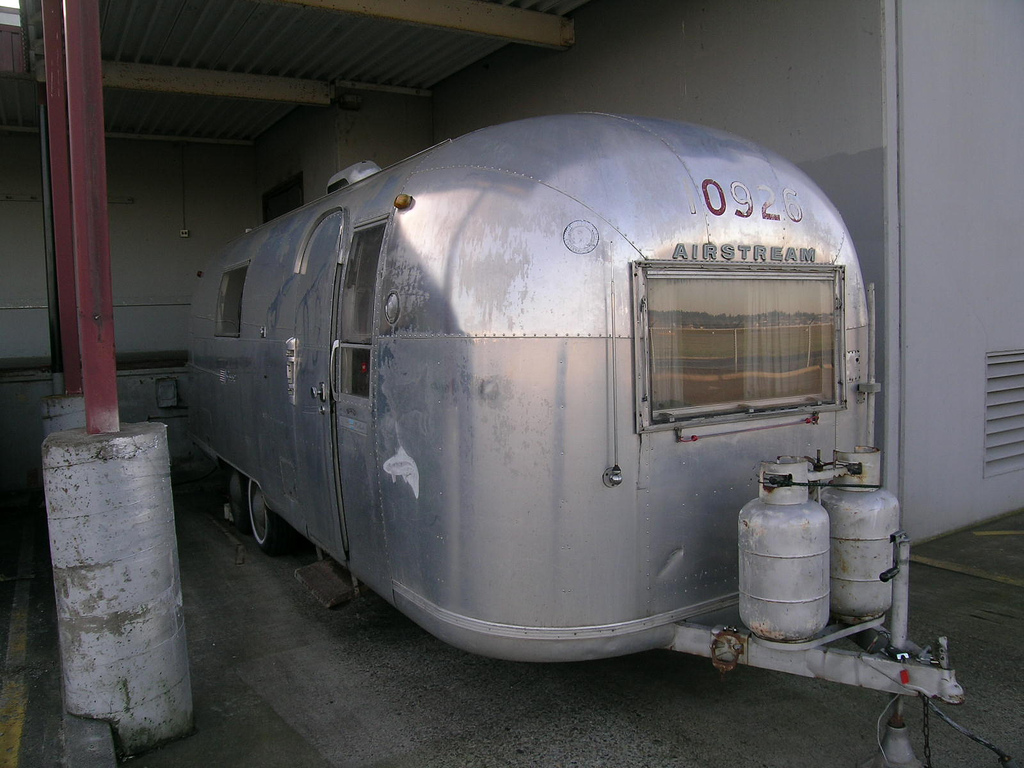
"From an Indiana Dodge To an Airstream by the parkway In the silver they would lodge And as for love they hit it sharply..."

=== Airstream Bohemians ===
"Airstream Bohemians" introduces another pair of Gorka's characters apparently living in an Airstream, recreational vehicle.

Musicians:

- Robbie Magruder – drums
- J. T. Brown – bass
- Jonathan Carroll – piano
- Duke Levine – electric guitar
- John Jennings – baritone electric guitar and percussion
- John Gorka – vocal & guitar

=== Paradise, Once ===
Musicians:

- Robbie Magruder – drums
- Michael Manring – bass
- Dean McGraw – acoustic guitar
- Peter Ostroushko – mandolin
- John Jennings – baritone acoustic guitar, and percussion
- Jennifer Kimball and Lucy Kaplansky – vocals
- John Gorka – vocal & acoustic guitar

=== Campaign Trail ===
Between Five and Seven was released just months prior to the 1996 U.S. presidential election, this song, however, appears to be several years older. "Campaign Trail" is spoken from the point of view of a candidate who is apologetic, but still seemingly insincere:

And I hope you will forgive me if I don't return your call
But there's someone watching every move I make
And I've got more hands than I could ever shake

At times the message appears to be of a more personal nature. Perhaps as a touring and performing songwriter, Gorka sees parallels between himself and the politician on the trial:

I pay my bills to the time collectors
They're getting more from me each day
I pay them off a few words at a time

Unlike the other songs, the basic tracks of this one were recorded by Eric Paul at Imagine Studios in Nashville, Tennessee. An earlier mix of the song appeared on the EP, Motor Folkin' (Windham Hill/High Street Records, 1994).

Musicians:

- Dave Mattacks – drums
- J. T. Brown – bass
- John Jennings – electric guitar, lap steel, organ, and percussion
- John Gorka – vocal & guitar

=== Edgar the Party Man ===
Following his own forty-sixth birthday (nearly eight years after this album's release) Gorka proclaimed on his web site, "I am now officially older than Edgar The Party Man." "Edgar" is one of Gorka's characters, a middle-aged divorcé looking for a good time.

My name is Edgar
And I am a party man
I come from a party town
I come in my party van

Musicians:

- Robbie Magruder – drums
- Michael Manring – bass
- Dean McGraw – acoustic guitar
- Peter Ostroushko – mandolin
- John Gorka – vocal and guitar

=== Scraping Dixie ===
"Scraping Dixie" is by far the album's longest track. The song profiles yet another of Gorka's misfits, this time a war veteran working various jobs throughout the south to avoid winter's cold. The imagery in the lyrics include lines such as, "I'll be fighting 'till they put that tree suit on."

Musicians:

- Robbie Magruder – drums
- J. T. Brown – bass
- Jonathan Carroll – piano
- Duke Levine – electric guitar
- John Jennings – acoustic guitar, backpacker guitar,

percussion, and vocal

- John Gorka – vocal and guitar

== Credits ==
- Produced by John Gorka and John Jennings
- Bob Dawson – Engineer, Mixing
- David Glasser – Mastering
- Fred Harrington – Engineer, Second Engineer
- Shane T. Keller – Engineer, Second Engineer
- Laura Levy – Layout Design
- Ann Marsden – Photography
- Eric Paul – Engineer
- Chuck Peters – Production Assistant
- Jim Robeson – Engineer
- Tommy Tucker, Jr. – Engineer
- Candace Upman – Art Direction
- Rudy T. Zasloff – Design
