= Old Futures Gone =

Studio album by John Gorka
- Released: September 23, 2003
- Genres: Folk; Singer-songwriter
- Label: Red House
- Producer: Rob Genadek

John Gorka chronology
The Company You Keep (2001)	Old Futures Gone (2003)	Writing in the Margins (2006)

Professional ratings
Review scores
Source	Rating
Allmusic	3/5 stars
Detroit Free Press	3/5 stars
Dirty Linen	Unfavorable
Harp	Favorable
PopMatters	Mixed
Rambles	Favorable
Sing Out!	Favorable
Sydney Morning Herald	Favorable

Old Futures Gone is the ninth studio album by folk singer-songwriter John Gorka. It was released on September 23, 2003, by Red House Records. The album debuted at number two on the Folk Music Radio Airplay Chart and reached number one in October 2003. Gorka shares writing credit with his wife, Laurie Allman, for the lyrics of "Trouble and Care".

Lucy Kaplansky, Alice Peacock, Kathleen Johnson and Joel Sayles each add harmony vocals to various tracks.

== Track listing ==
1. "Dogs & Thunder" (Gorka) – 5:20
2. "Always" (Gorka) – 3:55
3. "Look the Other Way" (Gorka) – 3:11
4. "Outside" (Gorka) – 4:48
5. "Trouble & Care" (Allmann, Gorka) – 4:16
6. "Make Them Crazy" (Gorka) – 3:15
7. "Old Future" (Gorka) – 3:55
8. "Lay Me Down" (Gorka) – 4:18
9. "Shapes" (Gorka) – 3:49
10. "Soldier After All" (Gorka) – 4:27
11. "Poor Side" (Gorka) – 4:46
12. "War Makes War" (Gorka) – 4:06
13. "If Not Now" (Gorka) – 1:33
14. "Riverside" (Gorka) – 4:01

== Personnel ==
- Marc Anderson – Percussion, Drums
- Jim Anton – Bass
- Rick Barnes – Engineer
- J. T. Bates – Drums
- Zack Bates – Assistant Engineer
- Dirk Freymuth – Guitar (Electric)
- Rob Genadek – Percussion, Tambourine, producer, engineer, Mixing
- John Gorka – Guitar (Acoustic), Banjo, Vocals
- Kathleen Johnson – Harmony Vocals
- Lucy Kaplansky – Harmony Vocals
- Carla Leighton – Art Direction, Design
- Noah Levy – Drums
- Dean Magraw – Guitar (Electric)
- Ann Marsden – Photography
- John Munson – Bass
- Gene Paul – Mastering
- Alice Peacock – Harmony Vocals
- Rob & The Players – Arranger
- Joel Sayles – Harmony Vocals
- Enrique Toussaint – Bass
- Jeff Victor – Keyboards
- Ben Wittman – Engineer
