= After Yesterday =

Studio album by John Gorka
- Released: October 20, 1998
- Recorded: April–June 1998
- Genre: Folk; Singer-songwriter
- Length: 48:11
- Label: Red House
- Producer: John Jennings

John Gorka chronology
Between Five and Seven (1996)	After Yesterday (1998)	The Company You Keep (2001)

Professional ratings
Review scores
Source	Rating
Acoustic Guitar	favorable link
AllMusic	link
Billboard	
Boston Herald	(favorable)
Robert Christgau	(dud)
Dirty Linen	(favorable)
Paste	(favorable) link
Seattle Post-Intelligencer	(favorable)
Sing Out!	(favorable)
The Washington Post	(unfavorable)

After Yesterday is the seventh studio album by folk singer-songwriter John Gorka. It was released on October 20, 1998, by Red House Records. The album marked Gorka's return to Red House, after five albums with Windham Hill/High Street Records. This was heralded as a homecoming-of-sorts as Red House had issued Gorka's debut, I Know in 1987. The album also marks several changes in the life of the artist himself. Themes of parenting and family life first heard here on songs such as, "When He Cries" and "Cypress Trees" have now become a regular feature of Gorka's subsequent albums.

The album was well received by both reviewers and folk music radio DJs. The album debuted at number two on the Folk Music Radio Airplay Chart for October and held the number one position in November 1998.

== Songs ==
=== "Heroes" ===
"Heroes" was actually written by Gorka sometime in the 1980s. Gorka's copy of the lyrics were stolen, however, and the song was forgotten until Gorka relearned it from Hugh Blumenfeld a decade later. Blumenfeld tells this story:

I learned 'Heroes' from John in Kerrville – I think it was 1987. He was camped next to my wife Andrea and me in an enclave that had been dubbed 'Little New York.' I forget when we first heard the song, whether it was there or earlier in NYC, but it was at Andrea's request that I learned it. The song was brand new and we both loved it as soon as we heard it, but Andrea was the one who wanted to sing it. So, one bright midmorning when things in the campgrounds are lazy and slow, John passed over his notebook and I copied out the words. Soon afterwards, the notebook – along with his guitar – was stolen from his car and never recovered.

Andrea and I sang it at home from time to time during the next ten years – our own private little treasure. It never occurred to either of us to ask John about it, until I opened for him at Godfreys in 1997. It was only then I learned that the song had been lost in the notebook and that he'd forgotten it long ago. So I was able to play it for him downstairs in the dressing room before the gig and write him out a copy of his own lyric.

== Track listing ==
All songs written by John Gorka except where noted

1. "When the Ice Goes Out" – 4:51
2. "Thorny Patch" – 5:22
3. "Cypress Trees" – 3:12
4. "Wisdom" – 5:34
5. "Silvertown" – 4:31
6. "January Floor" (Cass Gorka, John Gorka) – 4:00
7. "Amber Lee" – 4:30
8. "After Yesterday" – 2:28
9. "When He Cries" – 1:24
10. "St. Caffeine" – 3:27
11. "Zuly" – 4:46
12. "Heroes" – 4:36

== Personnel ==
- Linda Beauvais – Artwork, Design
- David Glasser – Mastering
- John Gorka Banjo, – Guitar, Vocals, producer
- Peter Horvath – Engineer, Original Production Assistance
- John Jennings – Acoustic and electric guitar, Percussion, Drums, Keyboards, producer, Upright bass
- Lucy Kaplansky – Vocals
- Jed Luhmann – Engineer
- Dean Magraw – Acoustic guitar
- Michael Manring – Bass
- Ann Marsden – Artwork, Design, Photography
- Peter Ostroushko – Fiddle, Mandolin
- Andy Stochansky – Percussion, Drums, Original Production Assistance
- Tommy Tucker – Engineer
- Shane Washington – Mixing
