= Writing in the Margins =

Studio album by John Gorka
- Released: July 11, 2006
- Genre: Folk
- Label: Red House
- Producer: Rob Genadek

John Gorka chronology
Old Futures Gone (2003)	Writing in the Margins (2006)	So Dark You See (2009)

Professional ratings
Review scores
Source	Rating
Acoustic Guitar	(favorable) link
Billboard Magazine	(favorable)
Dirty Linen	(favorable)
FAME	(favorable) link
Fretplay	link
George Grahm	(favorable) link
Goldmine	(favorable)
Hickory Wind	(favorable) link
No Depression	
PopMatters	(6/10) link
Rambles	(mixed) link
Sing Out!	(favorable)
Twangville	(favorable) link

Writing in the Margins is the tenth studio album by folk singer-songwriter John Gorka. It was released on July 11, 2006, by Red House Records and debuted at number one on the Folk Music Radio Airplay Chart. One departure from previous recordings is the inclusion of a couple of cover songs that blend nicely with Gorka's own compositions. Gorka received some encouragement from Nanci Griffith to record Townes Van Zandt's "Snow Don't Fall", and pays tribute to a personal hero by covering Stan Rogers' "Lockkeeper". Gorka also shares writing credit with his wife, Laurie Allman, on several tracks.

Many of Gorka's past collaborators also return to perform here. Nanci Griffith, Lucy Kaplansky, and Alice Peacock each lend their voices to various tracks. Meanwhile, distinctive fretless bass player Michael Manring and multi-instrumentalist John Jennings also contribute their skills.

The album made a number of "best of 2006" lists and was nominated as a "Contemporary Release of the Year" by the North American Folk Music & Dance Alliance (an award that was given to the Wailin' Jennys for the album, Firecracker). The song "The Road to Good Intentions" was named by the Indie Acoustic Music Project to the list of "Songs of Note: 25 of the Best Songs from 2006".

== Track listing ==
1. "Chance of Rain" (Allman, Gorka) – (3:59)
2. "Broken Place" (Allman, Gorka) – (3:21)
3. "Satellites" (Gorka) – (2:24)
4. "Writing in the Margins" (Gorka) – (4:12)
5. "Snow Don't Fall" (Van Zandt) – (3:00)
6. "Bluer State" (Allman, Gorka) – (3:17)
7. "Arms Length" (Gorka) – (3:34)
8. "The Lockkeeper" (Rogers) – (5:09)
9. "I Miss Everyone" (Allman, Gorka) – (4:13)
10. "When You Sing" (Gorka) – (4:24)
11. "Road of Good Intentions" (Gorka) – (3:49)
12. "Unblindfold the Referee" (Gorka) – (2:25)
