= Legacy: A Collection of New Folk Music =

Compilation album

Compilation album by Various artists
- Released: 1989
- Genres: Folk; Singer-songwriter
- Length: 56:59
- Label: Windham Hill Records
- Producers: Robert Duskis; Will Ackerman

Professional ratings
Review scores
Source	Rating
Allmusic	4.5/5 stars

Legacy: A Collection of New Folk Music and Legacy II: A Collection of Singer-songwriters are a pair of compilations that were released by Windham Hill Records in 1989 and 1992 respectively to introduce listeners to a new crop of young singer-songwriters.

The first volume was an attempt to document a very recent "passing of the torch from one generation to another" that was taking place with a resurgence of folk music in the 1980s. In his liner notes, folk radio host for WNEW-FM, Pete Fornatale explains:

The depth and breadth of this new scene is truly staggering. The only constant is diversity. Sure, it owes a debt to the great American Folk Tradition, but call any of the fifteen artist gathered on this sampler a "folkie" and you're liable to get smashed over the head with a six-string acoustic guitar! This is, after all, the post-Dylan era of American music. The old labels simply don't work anymore. Especially when it comes to the arts. It's just an annoying habit we human have of categorizing anything and everything. There's no need for it. At all. Period.

Will Ackerman goes on to note the debt owed to "marvelously talented singer/songwriters" Suzanne Vega, Tracy Chapman and Michelle Shocked for "prying open the doors at radio and retail", but suggests that they are just the beginning and predicts that a real musical movement is about to explode onto the scene.

Some of the artists included on the compilation went on to major label record deals. Others remained fairly obscure. Windham Hill began long term relationships with some of the artists. Years later John Gorka recalled these events: "Windham Hill decided to include one of my songs on the first Legacy songwriters compilation. Before it was even released, Will Ackerman called to say that they would like me to record for them. Land of the Bottom Line came out shortly thereafter...."

Some of the artists already had albums of their own while other did not. Some of the artists also appeared on compilations for Fast Folk Musical Magazine.

Following the album's release, some of the artists appeared together in concerts to promote the compilation.

== Track listing ==
1. "Legacy" – Pierce Pettis
2. "My Father's Shoes" – Cliff Eberhardt
3. "Through the Leaves" – Rebecca Jenkins
4. "My Name Joe" – David Massengill
5. "When You Were Mine" (written by Prince) – Blue Rubies
6. "Handsome Molly" – Bill Morrissey
7. "Insanity Street" – Lillie Palmer
8. "I Saw a Stranger with Your Hair" – John Gorka
9. "Men and Women" (words and music by Andrew Ratshin) – Uncle Bonsai
10. "Old World" – Steven Roback
11. "Blue Ballet" – Anne Bourne
12. "Go Man Go" – Kirk Kelly
13. "On Squirrel Hill" – Iain Matthews
14. "Salvador" – Sara Hickman
15. "New Toys" – Milo Binder

Legacy II: A Collection of Singer-songwriters

Compilation album by Various artists
- Released: 1992
- Genres: Folk; Singer-songwriter
- Length: 55:02
- Label: Windham Hill/High Street Records
- Producers: Robert Duskis; Will Ackerman

Professional ratings
Review scores
Source	Rating
Allmusic	link

== Legacy II: A Collection of Singer-songwriters ==
The second volume was released several years after the first. As Will Ackerman's liner notes explain:

When we released the first volume of Legacy, we were documenting the resurgence of a new folk music and the singer-songwriter. Tracy Chapman and Suzanne Vega heralded this renaissance and new voices like John Gorka are emerging as part of the next wave. Four of the artists on Legacy went on to major label distribution recording deals. And far from being a flash in the pan this musical movement is very much alive and flourishing. The intelligent lyric is back. The singer-songwriter is very much a force again in today's music scene. Legacy II presents some of the finest emerging talents now recording. You'll be hearing more from them, but this may be where you discover them first.

The first compilation also resulted in the formation of a new branch at Windam Hill, High Street Records, a label that was to do for singer-songwriters what Windam Hill had done for new-age music. This second disc was introduced as a High Street Records release. High street also signed deals with some of the artist from the first compilation such as John Gorka and Pierce Pettis.

=== Track listing ===
1. "Tango" – Patty Larkin
2. "Ashes to Dust" – Ellis Paul
3. "Gloria" – Heidi Berry
4. "Who Woulda Thunk It" – Greg Brown
5. "I Write the Book" – Patty Griffin
6. "What Could I Add to That" – Frank Tedesso
7. "Slow Justice" – Paul Metsa
8. "Damn Everything But the Circus" (Jonatha Brooke) – The Story
9. "Look Over Your Shoulder" – Mark Heard
10. "Omaha Nebraska" – Doug Mathews
11. "Arrow" – Cheryl Wheeler
12. "Joey's Car" – Tony Gilkyson
13. "The Good Little Children" – Dots Will Echo (as Nick Berry)
