= The Company You Keep (John Gorka album) =

Studio album by John Gorka
- Released: March 13, 2001
- Genre: Folk; Singer-songwriter
- Label: Red House
- Producer: John Gorka; Rob Genadek; Andy Stochansky

John Gorka chronology
After Yesterday (1998)	The Company You Keep (2001)	Old Futures Gone (2003)

Professional ratings
Review scores
Source	Rating
Acoustic Guitar (Gorka's gear)	(not rated) link
Allmusic	link
Billboard	(favorable)
Boston Herald	(favorable) link
Dirty Linen	(favorable)
Paste	(favorable) link
Sing Out!	(favorable)
sonicnet.com	(favorable) 5/'01 archv at the Wayback Machine (archived May 9, 2001)
Washington Post	(mixed) link
Vintage Guitar	(favorable) link

The Company You Keep is the eighth studio album by folk singer-songwriter John Gorka. It was released on March 13, 2001, by Red House Records.

The album debuted at number two on the Folk Music Radio Airplay Chart for March 2001 and was ranked sixth on the year-end chart for 2001. The tracks receiving the most airplay were "What Was That", "Oh Abraham", "Let Them In", and "People My Age".

Consistent with previous albums, many of Gorka's musician friends join him on various tracks. His guests include such talents as Ani DiFranco, Mary Chapin Carpenter, Lucy Kaplansky, Rich Dworsky, Patty Larkin, John Jennings, Dean Magraw, and Peter Ostroushko.

== Track listing ==
All songs written by John Gorka.

1. "What Was That" – 5:17
2. "A Saint's Complaint" – 4:08
3. "Oh Abraham" – 4:21
4. "When You Walk In" – 3:21
5. "Shape of the World" – 3:03
6. "Morningside" – 3:46
7. "When I Lost My Faith" – 4:48
8. "Joint of No Return" – 2:58
9. "Let Them In" – 4:53
10. "Over There" – 2:35
11. "Hank Senior Moment" – 2:06
12. "Around the House" – 3:20
13. "Wisheries" – 5:53
14. "People My Age" – 2:16

== Personnel ==
- Mary Chapin Carpenter – Harmony
- Ani DiFranco – Guitar, Harmony
- Richard Dworsky – Organ, Piano, Production Assistant
- Dirk Freymuth – Guitar
- Rob Genadek – Engineer, Mastering, Mixing
- Heidi Gerber – Remote Recording
- Goatboy – Remote Recording
- John Gorka – Guitar, Tambourine, Vocals, engineer
- Fred Harrington – Engineer
- Gordon Johnson – Bass
- Kathleen Johnson – Harmony
- Lucy Kaplansky – Harmony
- Shane T. Keller – Engineer
- Patty Larkin – Guitar (Electric), Remote Recording
- Dean Magraw – Guitar
- Michael Manring – Bass, Remote Recording
- Ann Marsden – Photography
- Peter Ostroushko – Fiddle
- Andy Stochansky – Percussion, Drums
- Tommy Tucker – Engineer, Mixing
