= Land of the Bottom Line =

Studio album by John Gorka
- Released: 1990
- Recorded: Woodbridge, New Jersey, US
- Genre: Folk; Singer-songwriter
- Length: 59:27
- Label: High Street/Windham Hill
- Producer: Bill Kollar

John Gorka chronology
I Know (1987)	Land of the Bottom Line (1990)	Jack's Crows (1991)

Professional ratings
Review scores
Source	Rating
Allmusic	link
Fast Folk	(favorable)
Sing Out!	(not rated)

Land of the Bottom Line is the second album by contemporary folk singer-songwriter John Gorka. The album was also Gorka's major label debut for High Street Records/Windham Hill Records. The album was highly acclaimed by critics at the time, and continues to be cited by some as Gorka's finest work. The album's fifteen tracks and near hour-long length also provided an unusually large amount of music for a recording of that era. As Sing Out! editor Mark Moss noted in a review, the topics covered run "the gamut of John's favorite subjects: love, hard luck, local characters, and more."

== Track listing ==
All tracks are written by John Gorka, unless otherwise noted.

No.	Title	Writer(s)	Length
1.	"Land of the Bottom Line"		3:35
2.	"Armed with a Broken Heart"		3:31
3.	"Raven in the Storm"	John Gorka; Geoff Bartley	3:16
4.	"The One That Got Away"		3:46
5.	"Full of Life"		3:14
6.	"Stranger in My Driver's Seat"		3:37
7.	"The Sentinel"		3:56
8.	"Dream Street"		3:11
9.	"Mean Streak"		2:32
10.	"Italian Girls"		5:48
11.	"Jailbirds in the Bighouse"		3:54
12.	"Promnight in Pigtown"		5:21
13.	"I Saw a Stranger With Your Hair"		4:02
14.	"Love Is Our Cross to Bear"		4:57
15.	"That's How Legends Are Made"		4:47
Total length:			59:27

== Personnel ==
Musicians: (see individual song listings below)

Production:

- Produced – Bill Kollar
- Recorded/Mixed – Bill Kollar at London By Night Productions, Woodbridge, New Jersey
- Assembled – Rhonda Schoen at Sterling Sound, New York City
- Mastered – Ted Jensen at Sterling Sound, New York City, using the AUDIO AUTOMATION MUSE CONSOLE
- Arrangements – Janice Kollar
- Strings and English Horn written and arranged by Bill & Janice Kollar

Artwork:

- Concept and Art Direction – Anne Robinson
- Graphic design – Candace Upman
- Photography – Ann Marsden
- Photo printing – Myrslava Dziuk

== Songs ==
1. "Land of the Bottom Line"
  Gorka first recorded the song for a 1984 issue of Fast Folk Musical Magazine (FF 103, March 1984)
  Musicians:
  - John Gorka – vocals, harmony vocals, & acoustic guitar
  - Bill Kollar – electric guitar
  - Kevin Jenkins – bass
  - Marshal Rosenberg – conga
  - Janice Kollar – congas, salt shaker, vox voices, & harmony vocals
  - Tommy West – harmony vocals
2. "Armed with a Broken Heart"
  Musicians:
  - John Gorka – vocals, & acoustic guitar
  - Vic Colucci – bass
  - Michael Blair – Chinese drum
  - Claudia Schmidt – harmony vocals
  - Barry Mitterhoff – mandolin
3. "Raven in the Storm"
  The lyrics to Raven in the storm were co-written with Geoff Bartley. The two artist also collaborate on the song "Mystery to Me" which appeared years later on Gorka's Out of the Valley.
  There have been a number of artists to cover this song:
  - Mary Black, on her album, Circus (1995 Grapevine)
  - Ten Sugar Coffee on their Addicted (1998 Huge Secret)
  - The John Wright Band, on Language of the Heart (2001 Greentrax)
  Musicians:
  - John Gorka – vocals, harmony vocals, & acoustic guitar
  - Vic Colucci – bass
  - Chuck Loeb – electric guitar
  - Elliott Randall – electric guitar
  - Bill Kollar – electric guitar
  - Marshal Rosenberg – bongos
  - Janice Kollar – heartbeat, snare, cowbell, & shaker
4. "The One That Got Away"
  Musicians:
  - John Gorka – vocals & acoustic guitar
  - Vic Colucci – bass
  - Shawn Colvin – harmony vocals
5. "Full of Life"
  Musicians:
  - John Gorka – vocals & acoustic guitar
  - Vic Colucci – bass
  - Janice Kollar – accordion, harmony vocals, & tambourine
  - Michael Blair – Uru, clay drum, klangobjete, & shaker
  - Claudia Schmidt – harmony vocals
  - Joe Ascione – bass drum
6. "Stranger in My Driver's Seat"
  Musicians:
  - John Gorka – vocals, harmony vocals, & acoustic guitar
  - Elliott Randall – electric guitar
  - Vic Colucci – bass
  - Janice Kollar – bass drum & keyboards
  - Michael Blair – spox, crasher
7. "The Sentinel"
  Musicians:
  - John Gorka – vocals, harmony vocals, & acoustic guitar
  - Vic Colucci – bass
  - Marsha Heller – English horn
8. "Dream Street"
  Musicians:
  - John Gorka – vocals, harmony vocals, & acoustic guitar
  - Vic Colucci – bass
  - Chuck Loeb – electric guitar
  - Janice Kollar – bass drum, punching bag, gravel shaker, conga & harmony vocals
  - Shawn Colvin – harmony vocals
  - Tommy West – harmony vocals
9. "Mean Streak"
  Gorka's liner notes read, "'Mean Streak' is dedicated to Cliff Eberhardt and his bad attitude."
  Musicians:
  - John Gorka – vocals, harmony vocals, & acoustic guitar
  - Kefin Jenkins – bass
  - Janice Kollar – bass drum, shotgun, & cowbell
  - Bill Kollar – crasher
  - Vic Colucci – lead bass
10. "Italian Girls"
  Musicians:
  - John Gorka – vocals, & acoustic guitar
  - Vic Colucci – bass
  - Timothy Pitt – acoustic guitar
  - Frank Vignola – electric guitar
  - Eugene Friesen – cello
11. "Jailbirds in the Bighouse"
  Musicians:
  - John Gorka – vocals, harmony vocals, & acoustic guitar
  - Vic Colucci – bass
  - Chuck Loeb – electric guitar
  - Janice Kollar – drums, percussion, keyboards, & harmony vocals
  - Claudia Schmidt – harmony vocals
12. "Promnight in Pigtown"
  Musicians:
  - John Gorka – vocals & acoustic guitar
  - Vic Colucci – bass
  - Barry Mittenhoff – mandolin
  - Kenny Cosek – violin
  - Michael Blair – marching drum, cymbals, & klangobjekte
13. "I Saw a Stranger With Your Hair"
  "I Saw a Stranger with Your Hair" is one of two songs that previously appeared on Gorka's debut album for Red House Records, I Know at the request of Will Ackerman.
  Musicians:
  - John Gorka – vocals, harmony vocals, & acoustic guitar
  - Eugene Friesen – cello
  - Kenny Cosek – violin
  - Vic Colucci – bass
  - Janice Kollar – keyboards & harmony vocals
  - Shawn Colvin – harmony vocals
  - Tommy West – harmony vocals
14. "Love Is Our Cross to Bear"
  This is the other song re-recorded by Gorka that originally appeared on I Know.
  Musicians:
  - John Gorka – vocals & acoustic guitar
  - Chuck Loeb – electric guitar
15. "That's How Legends Are Made"
  Musicians:
  - John Gorka – vocals & acoustic guitar
  - Vic Colucci – bass
  - Timothy Pitt – acoustic guitar
  - Barry Mittenhoff – mandolin
  - Michael Blair – shaker
