= Out of the Valley =

Studio album by John Gorka
- Released: May 10, 1994
- Recorded: Nashville, Tennessee
- Genre: Folk
- Length: 49:06
- Label: High Street Records/Windham Hill Records
- Producer: John Jennings

John Gorka chronology
Temporary Road (1992)	Out of the Valley (1994)	Between Five and Seven (1996)

Professional ratings
Review scores
Source	Rating
Allmusic	link
Sing Out!	(favorable)
Washington Post	(favorable)

Out of the Valley is a 1994 album by contemporary folk singer-songwriter John Gorka. This is Gorka's fifth album and unlike the previous four recorded in various places in the northeastern United States, Out of the Valley was recorded at Imagine Sound Studios in Nashville, Tennessee. This is also the first of several Gorka albums to employ the talents of guitarist/producer John Jennings.

Guest vocalists include country music superstars Kathy Mattea and Mary Chapin Carpenter among others. Guest instrumentalists include guitarist Leo Kottke, Fairport Convention drummer Dave Mattacks, and bluegrass virtuosos Jerry Douglas and Tim O'Brien. A notable absence is the voice of Lucy Kaplansky whose background vocals have been a feature of all other Gorka albums.

This is perhaps Gorka's most commercial album and is his only work to have ranked on one of Billboard's charts. It peaked at # 26 on the "Heatseekers" chart. Reactions to the increased level of commercial production in Gorka's folk music were varied. Allmusic states: "...many of the dense musical arrangements do a disservice to his powerful voice." Meanwhile, a review in Sing Out! reads: "...nowhere does star power take precedence over bringing out the best in these songs. Congratulations are due to both Gorka and to producer John Jennings." The songs are more upbeat than some of Gorka's earlier works and generally better suited to a more glossy production. Gorka's writing, however, remains strong. Sing Out! states that "Out of the Valley... reveals a mature artist with a keen sense of observation with equal parts humor and compassion." "The Valley" in Gorka's title is a reference to Pennsylvania's Lehigh Valley and as with Gorka's previous albums a number of songs feature stories and characters that are based on Gorka's experiences living in this area that surrounds Bethlehem, Pennsylvania.

High Street Records also offered a limited release promotional EP titled Motor Folkin' with alternative mixes of songs from the Out of the Valley recording sessions.

== Track listing ==
All songs written by John Gorka except where noted.

1. "Good Noise" – 3:05
2. "That's Why" – 3:19
3. "Carnival Knowledge (Second Hand Face)" – 3:46
4. "Talk About Love" – 3:11
5. "Big Time Lonesome" – 5:31
6. "Furniture" – 4:47
7. "Mystery to Me" (Gorka, Bartley) – 3:43
8. "Out of the Valley" – 4:48
9. "Thoughtless Behavior" – 4:22
10. "Always Going Home" – 3:32
11. "Flying Red Horse" – 4:14
12. "Up Until Then" – 4:48

== Songs ==
=== Good Noise ===
"Good Noise" is an upbeat gospel-tinged song that promotes a bright optimism not often found in Gorka's earlier work. High Street Records promoted this song with a music video that appeared on media such as CMT. Cover versions include a recording of the song by the Scottish folk band, The John Wright Band for the 2001 album, Language of the Heart.

Musicians:

- Drums – Dave Mattacks
- Bass – J. T. Brown
- Piano – Matt Rollings
- Electric and acoustic guitar – John Jennings
- Acoustic guitar and vocal – John Gorka
- Backing Vocals – Jonell Mosser, Barbara Santoro, Vinnie Santoro, and John Jennings
- "Testifying vocals" – Jonell Mosser

=== That's Why ===
Gorka never explicitly names the subject of "That's Why". Listeners, however, are able to ascertain much from various references. The following lines about a commemorative stamp are just one example:

The fat man's gone the thin one stayed
Still flashy in that gold lame'
Lick his back and press him down
Mail him to another town
That's why, why they say he's still alive

"That's Why" is not Gorka's only tribute to the "King of Rock'n'Roll", for another see the 2006 Billy C. Wirtz album, Sermon from Bethlehem, for a recording of "The King & I", a tune penned by Gorka and Fred Koller.

Musicians:

- Bass – – Michael Manring
- Lead guitar – Leo Kottke
- Acoustic guitar & vocal – John Gorka
- Backing vocal – Kathy Mattea

=== Carnival Knowledge ===
According to Sing Out! "Carnival Knowledge" is a tragic story of a circus clown whose grease paint provides his only escape from the depths of low self-esteem."

Musicians:

- Drums – Vinnie Santoro
- Bass – J. T. Brown
- Electric guitar – John Jennings
- Acoustic guitar – John Gorka

=== Talk About Love ===
"Talk About Love" is another one of Gorka's happy blue-inflected love songs. As with the track, "Good Noise" the liner notes describe Jonell Mossers' work as "Testifying vocals".

Musicians:

- Drums – Dave Mattacks
- Bass – J. T. Brown
- Piano & Organ – Matt Rollings
- Electric, acoustic guitars & backing vocal – John Jennings
- 12-string guitar & vocal – John Gorka
- Testifying & backing vocals – Jonell Mosser

=== Big Time Lonesome ===
- Bass – John Jennings
- "Weisenheimer" guitar – Jerry Douglas
- Acoustic guitar – John Gorka

=== Furniture ===
Sing Out! called "Furniture", a "song of critical self-examination without self-pity."

Musicians:

- 10-string basses – Michael Manring
- Guitar – Leo Kottke
- Vocal – John Gorka
- Backing vocals – Kathy Mattea

=== Mystery to Me ===
According to Allmusic, "the track "Mystery to Me" reveals [Gorka's] wicked sense of humor about the mysteries of attraction."

Musicians:

- Drums – Dave Mattacks
- Bass – J. T. Brown
- Electric & acoustic guitars – John Jennings
- Gibson archtop acoustic guitar & vocal – John Gorka
- Backing & testifying vocals – Jonell Mosser
- Tambourine – "Mystery Man"

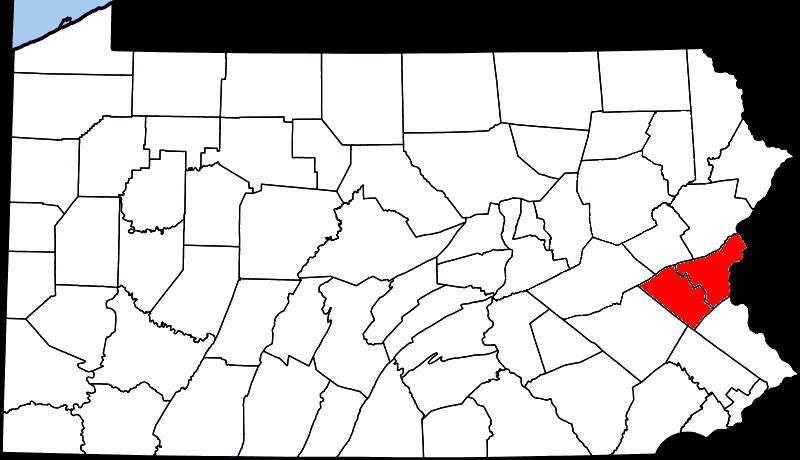
Counties comprising the Lehigh Valley region of eastern Pennsylvania

=== Out of the Valley ===
Like many songs in Gorka's earlier catalog, "Out of the Valley" draws on Gorka's experiences living in Pennsylvania's Lehigh Valley. It was sometime around the time of the recording of this album that Gorka himself moved out of "The Valley" and began the transition to his current home in Minnesota.

Musicians:

- Drums – Dave Mattacks
- Bass – J. T. Brown
- Electric guitar & organ – John Jennings
- Acoustic guitar & vocal – John Gorka
- Additional vocals – Mary Chapin Carpenter

=== Thoughtless Behavior ===
Musicians

- Acoustic guitar & vocal – John Gorka
- Backpack guitar, & harmony vocal – John Jennings
- Bass – Michael Manring

=== Always Going Home ===
Musicians:

- Percussion – Vinnie Santoro
- Bass mandolin & vocal – Tim O'Brien
- Bass – John Jennings
- Dobro – Jerry Douglas
- 12-string guitar – John Gorka

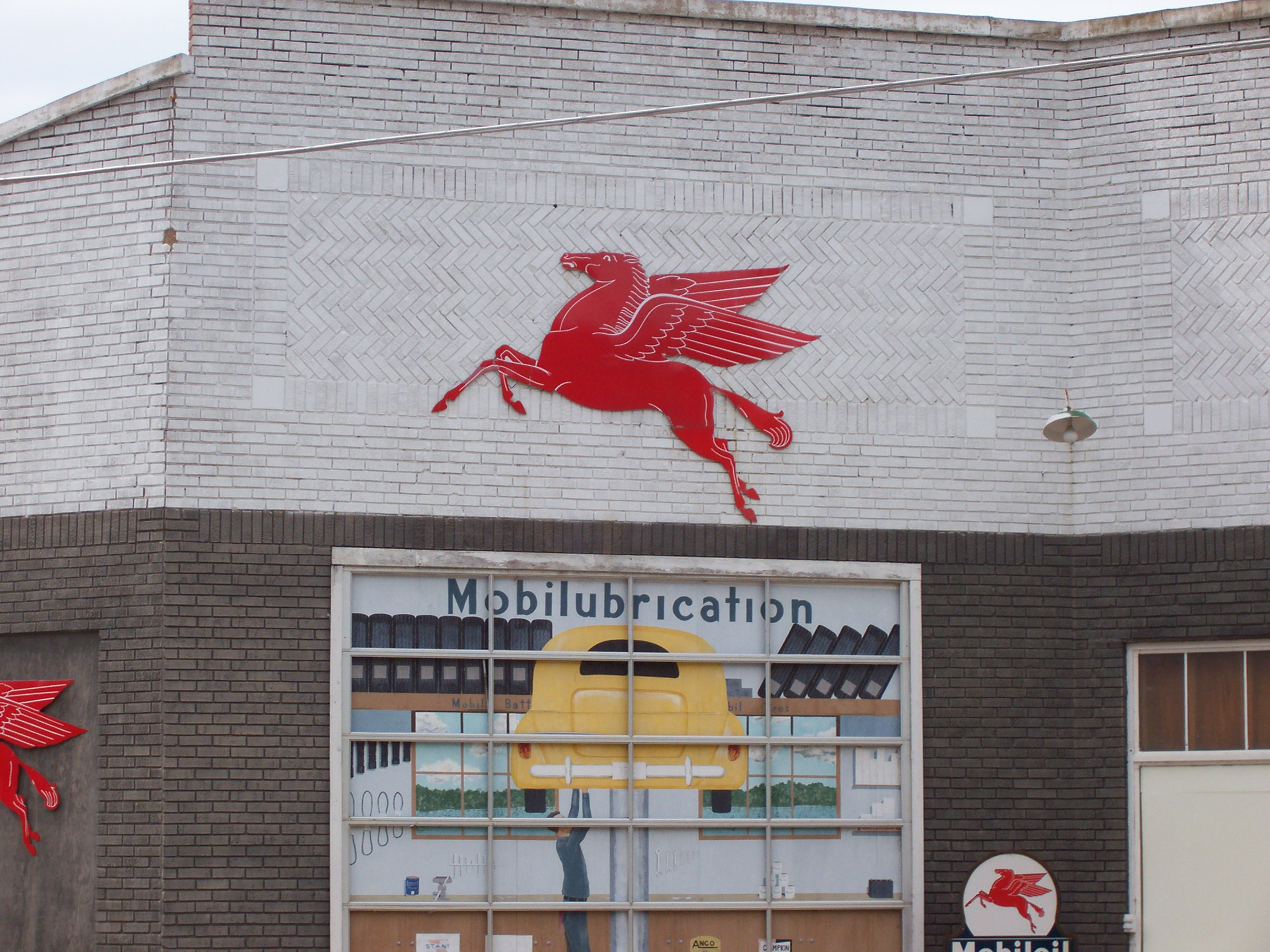
"Flying Red Horse" is an apparent reference to the historic Mobil logo

=== Flying Red Horse ===
"Flying Red Horse" has been described as a "fantasy of freedom inspired by a gas station sign." Gorka shares his vision of the Mobil logo coming to life and escaping to the sky. While the song is delivered in a serious tone Gorka manages to inject a fair amount of humor:

Full serve attendants were spilling their hoses
Self-serve was doing the same
The manager dialed the emergency numbers
Insurance man won't take the claim

A reviewer for Allmusic preferred the relatively simple production. He wrote that this track, "in which the only instrumentation is a guitar and the voices of Gorka and Mary Chapin Carpenter, demonstrates an amazing imagination and an ability to captivate with great storytelling."

Musicians:

- Bass – Edgar Meyer
- Piano Matt Rollings
- Acoustic guitar & vocal John Gorka
- Backing vocal Mary Chapin Carpenter

=== Up Until Then ===
Sing Out! stated that "Up Until Then" offers a scene of local characters "that would make Tom Waits proud."

Musicians:

- Drums – Dave Mattacks
- Bass – J. T. Brown
- Electric & acoustic guitars – John Jennings
- Acoustic guitars & vocal – John Gorka
- Harmony vocal – Jonell Mosser

== Credits ==
Musicians:

(see individual songs above)

Production:

- Producer – John Jennings
- Recorded – Eric Paul at Imagine Sound Studios, Nashville, Tennessee, US
- Additional recording of Leo Kottke – Scott Rivard at Studio M, Saint Paul, Minnesota, US
- Mixed – Bob Dawson and John Jennings at Bias Recording Company, Springfield, Virginia, US

Cover of Motor Folkin', a 1994 promotional EP

== Motor Folkin' ==
Motor Folkin' was a 1994 limited issue promotional EP released by High Street Records. Perhaps the track of greatest interest from this release was the live solo version of "Furniture" recorded at "The Mountain", KMTT in Seattle, Washington. Remixes of "Mystery to Me" and "Good Noise" were also included, as was an in-studio recording of "Campaign Trail". A final mix of "Campaign Trail" was not released until 1996 on Gorka's Between Five and Seven.
