= So Dark You See =

Studio album by John Gorka
- Released: October 13, 2009
- Genre: Folk, singer-songwriter
- Label: Blue chalk/Red House
- Producer: Rob Genadek and John Gorka

John Gorka chronology
Writing in the Margins (2006)	So Dark You See (2009)	Red Horse (2010)

So Dark You See is the eleventh studio album by folk singer-songwriter John Gorka, released on October 13, 2009. The album offers eight new examples of Gorka's own lyrical songwriting, two instrumental tracks, poetry of Robert Burns and William Stafford performed and set to music by Gorka, covers of songs by fellow folk musicians, Utah Phillips and Michael Smith, and Gorka's take on the blues standard, "Trouble in Mind".

== History ==
This was Gorka's eleventh studio album release in a career that has spanned over two decades. The album held the top position on the Folk Radio airplay chart for the months of September and October 2009. Folk Alley named "Ignorance & Privilege" as No. 6 on their list of The Top 10 Folk Songs of 2009.

== Reception and commentary ==
Professional ratings
Review scores
Source	Rating
Acoustic Guitar	favorable
Curator	favorable
Flying Shoes	favorable
The Gazette	favorable
MusicMatters	favorable
PopMatters	6/10
Washington Post	favorable
Rob Williams	favorable

Critical response was positive.

== Track listing ==
No.	Title	Lyrics	Music	Musicians	Length
1.	"A Fond Kiss"	Robert Burns	John Gorka	* John Gorka (vocal, guitar, harmonium, V-Station)	3:37
2.	"Whole Wide World"	John Gorka	John Gorka	* John Gorka (vocal, acoustic guitar, percussion): Dean Magraw (acoustic guitar); Marc Anderson (percussion); Eliza Gilkyson (supporting vocals); Jeff Victor (keyboard)	2:54
3.	"Can't Get Over It"	John Gorka	John Gorka	* John Gorka (vocal, acoustic guitar): Dan Chouinard (accordion); Jeff Victor (Oberheim OB-8)	3:32
4.	"Fret One"	[instrumental]	John Gorka	* John Gorka (acoustic guitar): Dirk Freymuth (electric guitar); Michael Manring (fretless bass); Rob Genadek (percussion); "Stylus" (percussion)	2:10
5.	"Ignorance & Privilege"	John Gorka	John Gorka	* John Gorka (vocal, acoustic guitar): Marc Anderson (percussion); Enrique Toussaint (electric guitar); Dirk Freymuth (electric guitar); Eliza Gilkyson (harmony vocal)	4:22
6.	"Utah"			(The track is Utah Phillips' recorded voice, stating a wish hear Gorka perform one of his songs.)	0:07
7.	"I Think of You"	Utah Phillips	Utah Phillips	* John Gorka (vocal, acoustic guitar): Lucy Kaplansky (harmony vocals); Joel Salyles (upright bass); Jeff Victor (keyboard)	3:36
8.	"Where No Monument Stands"	William Stafford	John Gorka	* John Gorka (vocal, acoustic guitar): Dean Magraw (electric guitar)	2:23
9.	"Night into Day"	John Gorka	John Gorka	* John Gorka (vocal, acoustic guitar): Peter Ostroushko (fiddle)	3:44
10.	"Fret Not"	[instrumental]	John Gorka	* John Gorka (fretless tackhead banjo)	1:20
11.	"Live by the Sword"	John Gorka	John Gorka	* John Gorka (vocal, keyboards, acoustic guitar): Dean Magraw (2nd acoustic guitar); Joel Sayles (upright bass)	2:14
12.	"Trouble in Mind"	Richard M. Jones	Richard M. Jones	* John Gorka (vocal, acoustic guitar)	3:02
13.	"The Dutchman"	Michael Smith		* John Gorka (vocal, acoustic guitar)	4:48
14.	"Mr. Chambers"	John Gorka	John Gorka	* John Gorka (vocal, acoustic guitar)	2:58
15.	"That Was the Year"	John Gorka	John Gorka	* John Gorka (vocal, acoustic guitar)	2:46
16.	"Diminishing Winds"	John Gorka	John Gorka	* John Gorka (vocal, guitar): Joel Sayles (harmony vocal); Enrique Toussaint (electric bass); Dan Chouinard (accordion); Marc Anderson (percussion)	4:09
113.	Untitled		Michael Smith

== Personnel ==
Musicians

- John Gorka — vocals, fretless banjo, guitar, harmonium, keyboards and percussion
- Marc Anderson — percussion
- Dan Chouinard – accordion
- Dick Freymuth – electric guitar
- Rob Genadek – Percussion
- Eliza Gilkyson — vocals
- Dean Magraw — electric and acoustic guitars
- Michael Manring — fretless bass
- Peter Ostroushko — fiddle and mandolin
- Joel Sayles – vocals, upright bass
- Enrique Toussaint – electric bass
- Jeff Victor – keyboards

Production

- Produced by Rob Genadek and John Gorka
- Engineering by Rob Genadek and John Gorka at The Brewhouse in Minneapolis, MN
- Lucy Kaplansky recorded by Mark Dann in New York City

Artwork

- Front cover painting, "Clairmont near Ascutney" by Tom Pirozzoli
- Back cover photography by Jos Van Vliet
- Art direction and design by Jon Reischl

== Chart performance ==
Chart (2009)	Peak position
Folk Radio Top Albums	1
Americana Radio Albums	44
