= The Red Thread (Lucy Kaplansky album) =

Studio album by Lucy Kaplansky
- Released: February 10, 2004
- Recorded: June 2003
- Genre: Folk, singer-songwriter
- Label: Red House
- Producer: Ben Wittman

Lucy Kaplansky chronology
Every Single Day (2001)	The Red Thread (2004)	Over the Hills (2007)

Professional ratings
Review scores
Source	Rating
Allmusic	3/5 stars

The Red Thread is the fifth solo album by New York City singer-songwriter Lucy Kaplansky, released in 2004.

== Track listing ==
Unless noted otherwise, lyrics by Lucy Kaplansky & Richard Litvin, music by Lucy Kaplansky

1. "I Had Something" – 4:16
2. "Line in the Sand" – 4:23
3. "Love Song/New York" (Bill Morrissey) – 4:35
4. "This Is Home" – 4:02
5. "Off and Running" (James McMurtry) – 3:44
6. "Land of the Living" – 4:04
7. "Cowboy Singer" (Dave Carter) – 3:59
8. "Hole in My Head" (Jim Lauderdale, Buddy Miller) – 2:53
9. "The Red Thread" – 3:35
10. "Brooklyn Train" (Kaplansky, Litvin, Ben Wittman) – 3:15

== Personnel ==
- Lucy Kaplansky – vocals, guitar, background vocals
- Duke Levine – mandolin, guitar, slide guitar, mandola, National Steel guitar, guitorgan
- Andy Ezrin – piano
- Jon Herington – guitar, Harmonium
- Zev Katz – bass, baritone guitar
- Brian Mitchell – organ
- Jonatha Brooke – background vocals
- Eliza Gilkyson – background vocals
- John Gorka – background vocals
- Richard Shindell – background vocals
- Ben Wittman – piano, drums, percussion, keyboards, Wurlitzer

Production notes:

- Ben Wittman – producer, engineer
- Manfred Knoop – engineer
- Rob Genadek – engineer
- Steven Patterson – engineer
- Roy Hendrickson – engineer
- Ben Wisch – mixing
- David Glasser – mastering
- Andy Sarroff – assistant
- Carla Leighton – graphic design
- C. Taylor Crothers – photography
- Assumpta Clohessy – make-up, hair stylist
