= Red Horse (album) =

Studio album by Red Horse (Eliza Gilkyson, John Gorka, and Lucy Kaplansky)
- Released: July 13, 2010
- Genre: Folk; Singer-songwriter
- Length: 44:26
- Label: Red House

Eliza Gilkyson chronology
Beautiful World (2008)	Red Horse (2010)

John Gorka chronology
So Dark You See (2009)	Red Horse (2010)

Lucy Kaplansky chronology
Over the Hills (2007)	Red Horse (2010)

Professional ratings
Review scores
Source	Rating
Allmusic	3/5 stars
American Songwriter	3.5/5 stars
FAME	(favorable)
Flyinshoes Review	(favorable)
Folk Alley	(favorable)
PopMatters	(6/10)
Rambles	(favorable)
Sing Out!	(favorable)
Twin Cities Daily Planet	(favorable)

Red Horse is a collaboration by independent folk singer-songwriters Eliza Gilkyson, John Gorka, and Lucy Kaplansky. It is both the name of the studio album released by the trio on Red House Records in July 2010, and the name under which they have toured and performed in concert together as a supergroup.

== Track listing ==
No.	Title	Writer(s)	Performed by	Length
1.	"I Am a Child"	Neil Young	Eliza Gilkyson	3:26
2.	"Scorpion"	Lucy Kaplansky, Richard Litvin	Lucy Kaplansky	3:48
3.	"Wild Horse"	Gilkyson	John Gorka	3:51
4.	"Promise Me"	Kaplansky, Litvin	Gilkyson	4:30
5.	"Don't Mind Me"	Kaplansky, Litvin	Gorka	4:07
6.	"Sanctuary"	Gilkyson	Kaplansky	3:53
7.	"Coshieville"	Stuart McGregor	Gorka	3:25
8.	"Blue Chalk"	Gorka	Kaplansky	4:11
9.	"Forget to Breathe"	Gorka	Gilkyson	2:18
10.	"If These Walls Could Talk"	Gorka	Gorka	2:26
11.	"Walk Away from Love"	Gilkyson	Gilkyson	5:00
12.	"Wayfaring Stranger"	traditional	Kaplansky	3:31

== Chart performance ==
Sales charts:

Chart	Peak position	Date
U.S. Billboard Top Heatseekers	38	August 21, 2010
U.S. Billboard Folk albums	6	August 21, 2010

Radio airplay charts:

Chart	Peak position	Date
Folk Radio Top Albums	1	July & August 2010
Folk Radio Top Artists	1	July & August 2010
Americana Radio Albums	29	August 9, 2010

== Tour dates ==
Date	Venue	City
August 21, 2010	Summerfolk Music and Crafts Festival	Owen Sound, ON, Canada
August 22, 2010	Summerfolk Music and Crafts Festival	Owen Sound, ON, Canada
November 19, 2010	Northern California Center for the Arts	Grass Valley, CA
November 20, 2010	Sebastopol Community Center	Sebastopol, CA
November 21, 2010	The Freight and Salvage	Berkeley, CA
November 22, 2010	Sierra Nevada Brewing Company	Chico, CA
December 2, 2010	Smith Opera House	Geneva, NY
December 3, 2010	The Ridgefield Playhouse	Ridgefield, CT
December 4, 2010	Landmark on Main Street	Port Washington, NY
April 14, 2011	Aladdin Theater	Portland, OR
April 15, 2011	The Minnaert Center for the Arts; South Puget Sound Community College	Olympia, WA
April 17, 2011	St. James Hall	Vancouver, BC, Canada
June 19, 2011	Clearwater's Great Hudson River Revival, Croton Point Park	Croton-on-Hudson, NY
July 12, 2011	Great South Bay Music Festival	Patchogue, NY
