= The High Above and the Down Below =

Studio album by Cliff Eberhardt
- Released: April 10, 2007
- Recorded: Minneapolis, Minnesota
- Genres: folk, singer–songwriter
- Length: 39:48
- Label: Red House
- Producer: Eric Peltoniemi

Cliff Eberhardt chronology
School for Love (2002)	The High Above and the Down Below (2007)

The High Above and the Down Below is the seventh studio album by contemporary folk singer–songwriter Cliff Eberhardt. It was released on Red House Records on April 10, 2007. It is Eberhardt's first album in five years and follows a lengthy recovery from serious injuries Eberhardt suffered in a 2002 auto accident.

== Recording ==
The album was recorded live-in-studio and produced by Eric Peltoniemi. Only a few overdubs were added (mostly doubling Eberhardt's own slide guitar work to his own guitar playing). Eberhardt says, "This is the recording that I always wanted to make." The musicians featured include Eberhardt (vocals & guitars), Richard Dworsky (piano, B3, Rhodes), Gordy Johnson (basses), and J. T. Bates (drums).

== Reception ==
Professional ratings
Review scores
Source	Rating
Dirty Linen	(favorable)
Folkwax	(8/10)
Music Matters	(favorable)
Sing Out!	(favorable)

The album received favorable reviews, and made at least one critic's list of best albums of the year. The album debuted at #12, on the Folk Radio Airplay chart for April 2007.

== Track listing ==
All songs written by Cliff Eberhardt

1. "The High Above and the Down Below" - 3:14
2. "Missing You" - 2:43
3. "It's Home Everywhere I Go" - 3:28
4. "The Next Big Thing" - 3:15
5. "The Right Words" - 4:52
6. "After the Rain Falls" - 2:14
7. "Assembly Line" - 3:55
8. "Dug Your Own Grave" - 2:57
9. "Let This Whole Thing Burn" - 3:18
10. "New Is What's Come Over You" - 4:04
11. "I'm All Right" - 2:34
12. "Goodbye Again" - 3:09

== Credits ==
=== Musicians ===
- Cliff Eberhardt - vocals & acoustic & electric guitars
- Richard Dworsky - piano, Hammond B3 organ, Rhodes piano
- Gordy Johnson - electric and acoustic bass
- J. T. Bates - drums and percussion
- Matt Zimmermann - congas on "After the Rain Falls"

=== Production ===
- Produced by Eric Peltoniemi
- recorded, mixed, and mastered by Mathew Zimmerman at Wild Sound, Minneapolis, Minnesota
  - Assisted by Gerard Boissy
  - Additional input from Chris Frymire

=== Artwork ===
- Photography - Jim Herrington
- Layout and design - Eric Peltoniemi
- Cover concept - Cliff Eberhardt

=== Other ===
- Bookings - Steve Lindquist
- Management - Stephen Garvan/Garvan Management

== Charts ==
date	chart	peak
April 2007	Folk Radio Airplay Chart	12

== Releases ==
year	format	label	catalog #
2007	CD	Red House	RHR CD 199
