= Temporary Road =

Studio album by John Gorka
- Released: December 8, 1992
- Genre: folk, singer-songwriter
- Length: 45:53
- Label: High Street
- Producer: Steven Miller and Dawn Atkinson

John Gorka chronology
Jack's Crows (1991)	Temporary Road (1992)	Out of the Valley (1994)

Professional ratings
Review scores
Source	Rating
Allmusic	3/5 stars

Temporary Road is the fourth album by folk singer-songwriter John Gorka. In 1992 there was some critical consensus that Gorka was one of the leading male voices of the "new folk" movement. As titles like "Looking Forward" and "Gravyland" might imply, the album has an overall optimistic tone. High Street Records produced videos for the upbeat "When She Kisses Me" and "I Don't Feel Like a Train", both of which received some airplay on CMT.

Despite the upbeat tone of many tracks the album also contains some darker political commentary. The title track, and "The Gypsy Life" offer reflections on the first Gulf War. "Can You Understand My Joy?" is asked in an ironic, sarcastic way. The mix of moods in Gorka's songs helped earn him the description of "the dark optimist."

== Track listing ==
All songs written by John Gorka

1. "Looking Forward" – 4:03
2. "Baby Blues" – 3:40
3. "The Gypsy Life" – 4;23
4. "Vinnie Charles Is Free" – 4:27
5. "Gravyland" – 3:38
6. "Temporary Road" – 3:30
7. "All That Hammering" – 3:21
8. "I Don't Feel Like A Train" – 3:06
9. "When She Kisses Me" – 2:44
10. "Grand Larceny" – 3:24
11. "If I Could Forget To Breathe" – 2:28
12. "Can You Understand My Joy" – 3:17
13. "Brown Shirts" – 3:52

== Personnel ==
- John Gorka – Vocals, 6 & 12-string guitars
- Nanci Griffith – Backing vocals
- Cliff Eberhardt – Backing vocals
- Lucy Kaplansky – Backing vocals
- Lee Satterfield – Backing vocals
- Dawn Atkinson – Backing vocals
- Denise Mininfield – Backing vocals
- Jennifer Newell – Backing vocals
- Charlene Moore – Backing vocals
- Tom Corwin – Backing vocals
- Darol Anger – Baritone violin
- Mike Marshall – Mandolin, nylon-string guitar
- William Gallison – Harmonica
- John Leventhal – Electric guitars
- Roy Rogers – Slide guitar, National steel guitar
- Sean Hopper – Synthesizer, organ
- Richard Tee – Organ
- Steve Gaboury – Synthesizer
- Michael Manring – Fretless bass
- Todd Phillips – Acoustic bass
- Rich Girard – Bass
- Denny Fongheiser – drums
