= Flesh and Bone =

Flesh and Bone may refer to:

- Flesh and Bone (film), a 1993 film starring Meg Ryan, Dennis Quaid and James Caan
- Flesh and Bone (miniseries), a 2015 American television series on Starz
- "Flesh and Bone" (Battlestar Galactica), an episode of the 2004 TV series Battlestar Galactica
- Flesh and Bone (Lucy Kaplansky album), 1996
- Flesh and Bone (Richard Marx album), 1997
- "Flesh and Bone", a song by Matt Maher from the album Alive Again
- "Flesh and Bone", a song by The Killers from the album Battle Born
- "Flesh and Bone", a song by Alien Ant Farm from the album ANThology
- "Flesh and Bone", a song by Marion Raven from the album Nevermore
- "Flesh & Bone", a song by Plan B from the album Heaven Before All Hell Breaks Loose
- "Flesh and Bone", a song from the 2020 Disney Channel movie Zombies 2
- Flesh and Bone, a young adult novel by Jonathan Maberry

== See also ==
- Flesh-n-Bone (born 1973), member of the rap group Bone Thugs-n-Harmony
