= Ten Year Night =

Studio album by Lucy Kaplansky
- Released: March 23, 1999
- Genre: Folk, singer-songwriter
- Length: 78:20
- Label: Red House
- Producer: Ben Wittman

Lucy Kaplansky chronology
Flesh and Bone (1996)	Ten Year Night (1999)	Every Single Day (2001)

Professional ratings
Review scores
Source	Rating
Allmusic	4/5 stars

Ten Year Night is the third solo album by American singer-songwriter Lucy Kaplansky, released in 1999.

== Track listing ==
All songs by Lucy Kaplansky and Richard Litvin unless otherwise noted.

1. "Written on the Back of His Hand" – 4:37
2. "Ten Year Night" – 5:10
3. "End of the Day" – 4:07
4. "One Good Reason" – 3:06
5. "Five in the Morning" – 4:05
6. "Promise Me" – 5:20
7. "Turn the Lights Back On" – 3:47
8. "Just You Tonight" – 4:00
9. "For Once in Your Life" – 4:13
10. "Somewhere Out There" (Steve Earle) – 3:16
11. "A Child's Hands" – 5:16

== Personnel ==
- Lucy Kaplansky – vocals, guitar, background vocals
- Duke Levine – guitar, slide guitar
- Larry Campbell – guitar, fiddle, mandolin, pedal steel guitar, slide guitar
- Jon Herington – guitar, slide guitar, Harmonium
- Zev Katz – bass, baritone guitar
- Jennifer Kimball – background vocals
- John Gorka – background vocals
- Richard Shindell – background vocals
- Ben Wittman – organ, drums, percussion

Production notes:

- Ben Wittman – producer, engineer
- Hillary Johnson – engineer
- James Tuttle – engineer
- Alan Williams – engineer
- Ben Wisch – mixing
- Grace Falconer – assistant engineer
- David Glasser – mastering
- C. Taylor Crothers – photography
