= Every Single Day (Lucy Kaplansky album) =

Studio album by Lucy Kaplansky
- Released: September 11, 2001
- Genre: Folk, singer-songwriter
- Label: Red House
- Producer: Ben Wittman

Lucy Kaplansky chronology
Ten Year Night (1999)	Every Single Day (2001)	The Red Thread (2004)

Professional ratings
Review scores
Source	Rating
Allmusic	4/5 stars

Every Single Day is the fourth solo album by American singer-songwriter Lucy Kaplansky, released in 2001.

== Track listing ==
All songs by Lucy Kaplansky and Richard Litvin unless otherwise noted.

1. "Written on the Back of His Hand" – 4:37
2. "Crazy Dreams" (Paul Brady) – 3:52
3. "Every Single Day" (Kaplansky, Litvin, Duke Levine) – 4:15
4. "Don't Mind Me" – 3:31
5. "Broken Things" (Julie Miller) – 4:05
6. "Guilty as Sin" – 4:27
7. "Nowhere" – 5:36
8. "No More Excuses" – 4:04
9. "Song for Molly" – 4:17
10. "You're Still Standing There" (Steve Earle) – 3:25
11. "The Angels Rejoiced Last Night" (Charlie Louvin, Ira Louvin) – 4:47

== Personnel ==
- Lucy Kaplansky – vocals, guitar, background vocals
- Duke Levine – guitar, mandola
- Larry Campbell – guitar, fiddle, mandolin, pedal steel guitar, Cittern, slide guitar
- Jon Herington – guitar, slide guitar
- Zev Katz – bass, baritone guitar
- Jennifer Kimball – background vocals
- John Gorka – background vocals
- Richard Shindell – background vocals
- Ben Wittman – piano, drums, percussion, keyboards

Production notes:

- Ben Wittman – producer, engineer
- Manfred Knoop – assistant engineer
- Ian Fraser – assistant engineer
- C. Taylor Crothers – photography
