= Razzy Dazzy Spasm Band (folk) =

The Razzy Dazzy Spasm Band was formed in 1976 at Moravian College in Bethlehem, Pennsylvania. The band consisted initially of John Gorka, Russ Rentler, and Doug Anderson. Later, Richard Shindell joined the group on lead guitar. Tim Germer was also part of the group, playing bass guitar. As Gorka would later describe it, "It was kind of a bluegrass band, but not a real formal, traditional one." Although the band never recorded an album or even went on a tour, three members (Gorka, Shindell, and Rentler) went on to have significant careers in folk music. Doug Anderson, is now a philosophy professor at Southern Illinois University and continues to play music locally and Tim Germer is a software engineer in Northern Virginia.

== Personnel ==
- John Gorka – banjo
- Russ Rentler – mandolin
- Doug Anderson – rhythm guitar
- Richard Shindell – lead guitar
- Tim Germer – bass guitar

== History ==
The original three members of the Razzy Dazzy Spasm Band met as freshmen at Moravian College at an open mic held as part of freshman orientation. Gorka was performing on banjo and Rentler on mandolin. After meeting guitarist Doug Anderson in the audience the three formed a band. According to Rentler, "John played incredible 5-string banjo and Doug Andersen provided the solid rock rhythm on his custom made Froggy Bottom guitars." A year or two later the group was joined by "Rich" Shindell on lead guitar. They were also joined by Tim Germer on bass guitar.

The band played at various venues in Pennsylvania's Lehigh Valley, particularly Godfrey Daniels, throughout four years of college. Gorka, a history and philosophy major, shifted his focus to music before the end of college and went on to become a major figure in the contemporary folk of the 1980s and 1990s. Anderson followed a more academic path completing a PhD and later joining the Department of Philosophy at Penn State University, as well as becoming author of the children's book Too Big To Dance. Anderson continues to play music locally with the alternative country bands Retromoose and Philbilly Cadillac. Rentler went on to medical school and continued to practice general internal medicine for several years. During that time he continued to pursue music on the side. Sometime around 2003 Rentler left his medical practice to pursue music full-time. His initial efforts have been well received in the press. Shindell eventually left Moravian and pursued his musical interests at Hobart College in Geneva, New York. Today Shindell, like Gorka, is a highly successful singer-songwriter.
