= The Tide (album) =

Studio album by Lucy Kaplansky
- Released: 1994
- Genre: Folk
- Length: 42:19
- Label: Red House
- Producer: Shawn Colvin

Lucy Kaplansky chronology
The Tide (1994)	Flesh and Bone (1996)

The Tide is the debut album by American singer-songwriter Lucy Kaplansky, released in 1994. It was produced primarily by Shawn Colvin.

Red House Records released a remastered version on October 4, 2005, including two bonus tracks.

== Critical reception ==
Professional ratings
Review scores
Source	Rating
AllMusic	3/5 stars
Chicago Tribune	2.5/4 stars

The Boston Herald wrote that the album "is a fine showcase for Kaplansky's small but emotive voice, a warbling approach that has its limits, but often pierces through to the frightened heart of a lovelorn lyric."

== Track listing ==
1. "The Tide" (Lucy Kaplansky, Richard Litvin) – 4:15
2. "When I Get to the Border" (Richard Thompson) – 2:57
3. "Texas Blues" (Bill Morrissey) – 2:47
4. "The Heart" (Tom Russell, Greg Trooper) – 3:34
5. "My Name Joe" (David Massengill) – 5:02
6. "Somebody's Home" (Kaplansky) – 3:37
7. "Guinevere" (Robin Batteau) – 4:17
8. "Delivery Truck" (George Gerdes, Mark Johnson) – 3:06
9. "You Just Need a Home" (Kaplansky) – 3:50
10. "The Eyes of My Beholder" (Batteau) – 3:02
11. "Secret Journey" (Sting) – 2:35
12. "Goodnight" (Cliff Eberhardt) – 3:17
13. "Everybody Knows but Me" (Jesse Winchester) – 2:14 (remastered edition)
14. "I've Just Seen a Face" (John Lennon, Paul McCartney) – 3:13 (remastered edition)

== Personnel ==
- Lucy Kaplansky – vocals, guitar, background vocals
- Larry Campbell – guitar, fiddle, dobro, mandolin, pedal steel guitar, Cittern, guitar
- Anton Sanko – organ, lap steel guitar
- Charlie Giordano – accordion
- Drew Zingg – guitar
- Michael Visceglia – bass
- Roly Salley – bass, background vocals
- Shawn Colvin – guitar, background vocals
- Richard Shindell – background vocals
- Kenneth Blevins – drums, percussion
- Frank Vilardi – percussion

Production

- Shawn Colvin – producer
- Anton Sanko – additional production
- Dennis McNerney – engineer
- Geoff Keehn – engineer
- David Glasser – mastering
- Linda Beauvais – art direction
- Irene Young – photography
