= Over the Hills =

Studio album by Lucy Kaplansky
- Released: March 13, 2007
- Recorded: August 2006
- Genre: Folk, singer–songwriter
- Label: Red House
- Producer: Ben Wittman

Lucy Kaplansky chronology
| The Red Thread (2004) | Over the Hills (2007) |

Professional ratings
Review scores
| Source | Rating |
|---|---|
| Dirty Linen | (favorable) |
| Folkwax | 8/10) |
| Vintage Guitar | (favorable) |
| The Washington Post | (favorable) |

Over the Hills is the sixth solo album by New York singer–songwriter Lucy Kaplansky, released in 2007. The album contains a mix of covers and original songs written with her husband, Rick Litvin.

The album is dedicated to the memories of the artist's father, Irving Kaplansky, and Red House Records founder, Bob Feldman. Several of the songs acknowledge the "gifts" that Kaplansky has received from these men.

Over the Hills topped the Folk Radio Airplay Chart in March 2007.

== Track listing ==
Unless noted otherwise, lyrics by Lucy Kaplansky & Richard Litvin, music by Lucy Kaplansky

1. "Manhattan Moon" – 3:54
  - Larry Campbell - pedal steel guitar
  - Duke Levine - mandola
  - Stephan Crump - acoustic bass
  - Ben Wittman - percussion, harmonium
  - Lucy Kaplansky - acoustic guitar, background vocals
2. "Amelia" – 4:08
  - Larry Campbell - electric slide guitar, acoustic guitar
  - Duke Levine - electric guitar
  - Stephan Crump - acoustic bass
  - Ben Wittman - drum set, 12-string electric guitar
  - Lucy Kaplansky - background vocals
3. "More Than This" (Bryan Ferry) – 4:22
  - Larry Campbell - pedal steel guitar
  - Duke Levine - National steel guitar
  - Stephan Crump - acoustic bass
  - Ben Wittman - harmonium
  - Jonatha Brooke - background vocals
  - Lucy Kaplansky - acoustic guitar
4. "Ring of Fire" (June Carter, Merle Kilgore) – 4:25
  - Larry Campbell - electric guitar
  - Duke Levine - electric guitar
  - Stephan Crump - acoustic bass
  - Ben Wittman - drum set, organ
  - Lucy Kaplansky - acoustic guitar, background vocals
5. "Swimming Song" (Loudon Wainwright III) – 3:01
  - Larry Campbell - fiddle, National steel guitar
  - Duke Levine - electric guitar
  - Stephan Crump - acoustic bass
  - Ben Wittman - percussion
  - Charles Giordano - accordion
  - Richard Shindell -background vocals
  - Lucy Kaplansky - acoustic guitar, background vocals
6. "Today's the Day" – 3:11
  - Ben Wittman - harmonium
  - Lucy Kaplansky - acoustic guitar, background vocals
7. "Over the Hills" – 3:45
  - Charlie Giordano - accordion
  - Jon Herington - acoustic guitar
  - Stephan Crump - acoustic bass
  - Eliza Gilkyson - background vocals
  - Ben Wittman - harmonium
  - Lucy Kaplansky - acoustic guitar, background vocals
8. "Somewhere Trouble Don't Go" (Julie Miller) – 3:31
  - Larry Campbell - electric slide guitar
  - Duke Levine - mandola
  - Stephan Crump - acoustic bass
  - Ben Wittman - percussion
  - Buddy Miller - background vocals
  - Lucy Kaplansky - background vocals
9. "Someday Soon" (Ian Tyson) – 4:01
  - Larry Campbell - mandolin, Dobro
  - Jon Herrington - electric guitar
  - Duke Levine - acoustic 12-string guitar
  - Stephan Crump - acoustic bass
  - Ben Wittman - drum set, harmonium
  - Lucy Kaplansky - acoustic guitar
10. "The Gift" – 3:43
  - Larry Campbell - pedal steel guitar
  - Duke Levine - electric mandolin
  - Stephan Crump - acoustic bass
  - Ben Wittman - floor tom
  - Richard Shindell - background vocals
  - Lucy Kaplansky - acoustic guitar

== Credits ==
Production

- Produced by Ben Wittman
- Arranged by Ben Wittman, Larry Campbell, Stephan Crump, & Duke Levine
- Recorded in August 2006 in New York City at Avatar Recordings
- Additional recording by Ben Wittman at Wittman Productions
- Mixed by Ben Wisch at Bailey Building and Loan
- Mastered by David Glasser at Airshow Mastering

Artwork

- Graphic design - Carla Leighton for Gloo Design, NY
- Photography - C. Taylor Crothers
- Back cover photo - Rick Litvin
- Hair & Makeup - Jim Crawford

== Charts ==
| Date | Chart | Peak |
|---|---|---|
| March 2007 | Folk Radio Airplay Chart | 1 |
