= Flesh and Bone (Lucy Kaplansky album) =

Studio album by Lucy Kaplansky
- Released: October 15, 1996
- Genre: Folk, singer-songwriter
- Length: 48:50
- Label: Red House
- Producer: Anton Sanko, Larry Campbell

Lucy Kaplansky chronology
The Tide (1994)	Flesh and Bone (1996)	Ten Year Night (1999)

Professional ratings
Review scores
Source	Rating
AllMusic	4/5 stars

Flesh and Bone is the second album by American singer-songwriter Lucy Kaplansky, released in 1996. The original release of the CD contained a hidden "Track 0" containing a cover of the Beatles' "I've Just Seen a Face" that could be accessed on some players by stepping back a track from Track 1.

== Track listing ==
All songs by Lucy Kaplansky and Richard Litvin unless otherwise noted.

1. "Scorpion" – 3:51
2. "(What's So Funny 'Bout) Peace, Love, and Understanding" (Nick Lowe) – 3:19
3. "If You Could See" – 3:32
4. "Don't Renege on Our Love" (Richard Thompson) – 4:16
5. "Still Life" – 5:58
6. "This Is Mine" – 3:08
7. "Mary and the Soldier" (Traditional) – 4:47
8. "Love Is the Ride" – 2:45
9. "The Thief" – 3:46
10. "Edges" – 5:14
11. "Return of the Grievous Angel" (Gram Parsons, Thomas Stanley Brown) – 3:52
12. "Ruby" – 4:22

== Personnel ==
- Lucy Kaplansky – vocals, guitar, background vocals
- Marc Shulman – guitar
- Larry Campbell – guitar, fiddle, dobro, mandolin, pedal steel guitar, Cittern, guitar
- Anton Sanko – organ, guitar, tiple, lap steel guitar
- Gary Schreiner – accordion
- Drew Zingg – guitar
- Zev Katz – bass
- Jennifer Kimball – background vocals
- John Gorka – background vocals
- Richard Shindell – background vocals
- Frank Vilardi – drums, percussion

Production notes:

- Anton Sanko – producer
- Tom Mudge – engineer
- Bruce Calder – engineer
- Dennis McNerney – mixing, engineer
- Matt Knobel – mixing, engineer
- David Glasser – mastering
- Linda Beauvais – art direction
- Paul Brady – arranger
