= Jack's Crows =

Studio album by John Gorka
- Released: 1991
- Genre: Folk
- Label: High Street
- Producers: Dawn Atkinson, Will Ackerman

John Gorka chronology
Land of the Bottom Line (1990)	Jack's Crows (1991)	Temporary Road (1992)

Jack's Crows is an album by the American musician John Gorka. It was released in 1991. The album's title was supplied by Jack Hardy. "House in the Fields", for which a video was produced, was marketed to country music outlets.

== Production ==
The album was produced by Dawn Atkinson and Will Ackerman. Its songs are set mostly in the small towns near the border between Pennsylvania and New Jersey. Unlike during the recording sessions for his previous albums, Gorka recorded most of Jack's Crows with all the musicians present in the studio at one time. It was Gorka's intention to move on from the love songs of previous albums to songs about places and people. Shawn Colvin sang on two of Jack's Crows' tracks.

== Critical reception ==
Professional ratings
Review scores
Source	Rating
AllMusic	3/5 stars
The Encyclopedia of Popular Music	3/5 stars
MusicHound Rock: The Essential Album Guide	3.5/5 stars
The Republican	4/5 stars

The Washington Post wrote that "Gorka matches his subtle, intelligent and original songwriting with a deep, thrilling baritone ripe with masculine melancholy, that makes whatever he's singing fairly unforgettable." The Ottawa Citizen stated that Gorka "conjures up characters and landscapes that share an unpretentious dignity and grandeur."

The Republican determined that, "though ballads dominate, there is sizzle here, particularly on the bleak urban landscape Gorka paints on 'Where the Bottles Break'." The State-Times concluded that, "though his calmly academic baritone on Jack's Crows tends to put the lyrics at arm's length, the lyrics themselves are so intelligently written that they manage to transcend their aloof presentation."

AllMusic noted that "Where the Bottles Break" "is a rockin' song about personal convictions and the real-estate business."

== Track listing ==
No.	Title	Length
1.	"Silence"
2.	"Treasure Islands"
3.	"Jack's Crows"
4.	"House in the Fields"
5.	"The Mercy of the Wheels"
6.	"Good"
7.	"Semper Fi"
8.	"Where the Bottles Break"
9.	"Night Is a Woman"
10.	"I'm from New Jersey"
11.	"My New Neighborhood"
12.	"The Ballad of Jamie Bee"
13.	"You're on Your Way"
