= Godfrey Daniels =

- Interactive map of Godfrey Daniels
- Location: Bethlehem, Pennsylvania, United States
- Coordinates: 40°36′38.52″N 75°22′40.98″W
- Owner: Godfrey Daniels, Inc.
- Capacity: 90
- Type: Music venue
- Events: Folk, Blues, Bluegrass, Cajun, Celtic, Country, Jazz

Construction
- Opened: March 19, 1976

Website
- godfreydaniels.org

Godfrey Daniels is a live music listening room in Bethlehem, Pennsylvania. Founded in 1976, the venue has featured performances by some of the leading musicians in folk, blues, bluegrass, Cajun, Celtic, country, and other contemporary and traditional genres. Additional events at Godfrey's include storytelling, poetry readings, children's theater, comedy, and open mikes.

== History ==
Godfrey's opened on March 19, 1976 in a former doughnut shop at 7 E. 4th Street on Bethlehem's South Side. Its co-founders were Dave Fry, a local musician who had graduated from nearby Lehigh University three years earlier, and Cindy Dinsmore, whose father taught at Lehigh. Fry served as the club's first artistic director with responsibility for booking artists, while Dinsmore managed the house and also prepared baked goods and other homemade foods sold at the venue's front counter. The venue seats under 100 attendees.

== Musicians ==
Some of the many artists who have appeared at Godfrey's include Tom Paxton, Townes Van Zandt, members of The Roches, John Gorka, Rosalie Sorrels, David Bromberg, John Sebastian, Livingston Taylor, John Hartford, Eric Andersen, Tony Trischka, Norman and Nancy Blake, Red Clay Ramblers, Peter Rowan, Gamble Rogers, Nanci Griffith, Guy Clark, Peter Tork, James Cotton, Stan Rogers, Odetta, Chris Smither, and Bill Morrissey.
