= Dots Will Echo =

- Origin: New Jersey, U.S.
- Genres: Rock, indie rock, pop, folk
- Years active: 1991–present
- Labels: Asthmatic Kitty, High Street, Windham Hill

Dots Will Echo is an indie rock group from Ridgewood, New Jersey. The band consists of vocalist and multi-instrumentalist Nick Berry and drummer Kurt Biroc.

== History ==
Musician William Ackerman produced and released Dots Will Echo's first official album Dots Will Echo in 1991 on High Street Records. The album sold 10,000 copies.

In 1996, the group independently released their second album Get Your Hands Off My Modem, You Weasel.

In 2001, lead singer Nick Berry appeared on William Ackerman's Grammy nominated album Hearing Voices. He played guitar and lent background vocals for the song "Fear Not Mary" with Ugandan American musician Samite.

On July 24, 2012, Dots Will Echo released a double-length album entitled Drunk Is The New Sober/Stupid Is The New Dumb on the Asthmatic Kitty label.

== Discography ==
- 1991: Dots Will Echo
- 1996: Get Your Hands Off My Modem, You Weasel
- 2000: "Black Folks, White Folks" (single)
- 2012: Drunk Is the New Sober/Stupid Is the New Dumb

Appearances

- 1992: "The Good Little Children", from Legacy II: A Collection of Singer–Songwriters
- 1999: '"Help! Gerard Cosloy Is Chasing Me With an Axe!", from Music for Listening To
- 2008: "Tell Me Today", from A Few Uneven Rhymes – A Tribute to Winter Hours
