= Alice Peacock =

American singer-songwriter

- Born: November 19, 1969 (age 56)
- Origin: White Bear Lake, Minnesota, U.S.
- Genres: Folk, Rock, Adult Contemporary
- Occupation: singer/songwriter
- Instruments: singer, guitarist, pianist
- Years active: 1999–present
- Labels: Peacock Music, Aware/Columbia
- Website: www.alicepeacock.com

Alice Peacock (born November 19, 1969) is an American folk singer known for "flawless songwriting with a near confessional quality." She has recorded seven albums, including Alice Peacock, released by Aware/Columbia Records.

== Style ==
Crain’s Chicago Business described Peacock as a performer with a “remarkable voice and a natural talent for writing lyrics that are smart and sentimental without being saccharine.” She prioritizes sincerity in her music. "Write from a true place. People can relate to it," she told New City Music. "If I'm really honest with myself as a writer, other people can smell that honesty," she said. "For me, music has always been a heart and a spirit thing."

== Early life and education ==
The daughter of a minister, Peacock was born and raised in White Bear Lake, Minnesota. Her grandfather was German actor Fritz Gnass, whose films included Fritz Lang’s M, her grandmother composed songs for cabarets, and both of her parents were actors. Peacock grew up in a house full of music—folk, Latin, religious, classical, singer-songwriters, acid rock—and started writing songs at an early age, eventually teaching herself to play piano and guitar.

Peacock attended Lawrence University, where she studied theater, and graduated in 1992. In 2012, The university honored her with its Lucia Russell Briggs Distinguished Achievement Award.

Peacock lives in Cincinnati, Ohio with her husband and three children.

== Career ==
Peacock started performing music professionally in the early 1990s, singing in bands and as a backup singer with San Francisco Bay Area blues recording artist E.C. Scott. After moving to Chicago, she began playing her original music. She released her first album, Real Day, in 1999.

After the release of Real Day, Peacock was signed to Aware/Columbia Records. (When she was picked up by Columbia, she baked cookies for everyone at the label.) They released her second album, Alice Peacock, which included "Bliss," a fan favorite, featuring backup vocals by John Mayer. Emily Sailers of the Indigo Girls and John Gorka also contributed vocals to the album. Peacock returned the favor as guest vocalist on John Gorka's albums Old Futures Gone and Writing in the Margins.

Peacock's first widespread exposure came when she opened for John Cougar Mellencamp during his 2002 tour. She continued to expand her fanbase with songs featured in films, commercials, and television. "Leading With My Heart" was on the soundtrack of the film Win a Date with Tad Hamilton!, "Sunflower" was featured in the film Because of Winn-Dixie, and "The Beginning" was featured in the 2006 series finale of What I Like About You. "Bliss" appeared in ads for J. Jill and Hershey's, and it became a wedding staple. Peacock also lent her voice to a film version of the children's book The Fox Went out on a Chilly Night, singing the title song. In 2005, Peacock sang "The Star-Spangled Banner" at U.S. Cellular Field during the Chicago White Sox's playoff run and again at their on April 4, 2006, at their World Series ring ceremony on April 4, 2006. In 2010, she returned to U.S. Cellular Field to perform "Bliss."

From Chicago, Peacock relocated to Nashville and then moved to Cincinnati in 2017. She took time off from recording to raise her three children, but continued to write and perform.

Peacock released her most recent album, Minnesota, in 2019. Minnesota was influenced by the time she spends each summer on the Minnesota-Canadian border working at summer camps maintained by The Camping & Education Foundation, an organization run by her husband. Peacock recorded the album with Emmylou Harris’s band, the Red Dirt Boys.

Minnesota was described as "stunningly beautiful" and "an entrancing album," by No Depression's Henry Carrigan. "The opening track on Alice Peacock's Minnesota, 'Love Goes with You,' is a harbinger of the subtle and simple beauty of the entire album," he wrote. "The song opens with Peacock's and Derri Daugherty's crystalline a cappella plea—'What does it mean when you say goodbye?'—before a snare shot opens into a shuffling, pop-inflected ballad laid down by shimmering vocals that create a cascading wall of sound. The song explores loving, leaving, and the fleeting nature of time and relationships."

After the Covid-19 pandemic, Peacock returned to touring and plays twenty-five to thirty shows annually at folk and acoustic clubs around the country.

== Activism ==
Peacock has advocated for artists' rights, including testifying before the Senate Judiciary Committee alongside Lyle Lovett on behalf of artist performance royalties for broadcast sound recordings. She set up Rock For Reading, a nonprofit that raises money and supports grassroots literacy programs through concerts, and continues to perform in benefit concerts in Cincinnati.

== Discography ==
- Real Day, 1999
- Imagination (EP)
- Alice Peacock, 2002, featuring backup vocals by John Mayer, John Gorka, and Emily Saliers
- Who I Am, 2006
- Love Remains, 2009
- Myrick/Peacock, 2011
- Live From Space, 2014
- Minnesota, 2019
