= Geoff Bartley =

American singer-songwriter (born 1948)

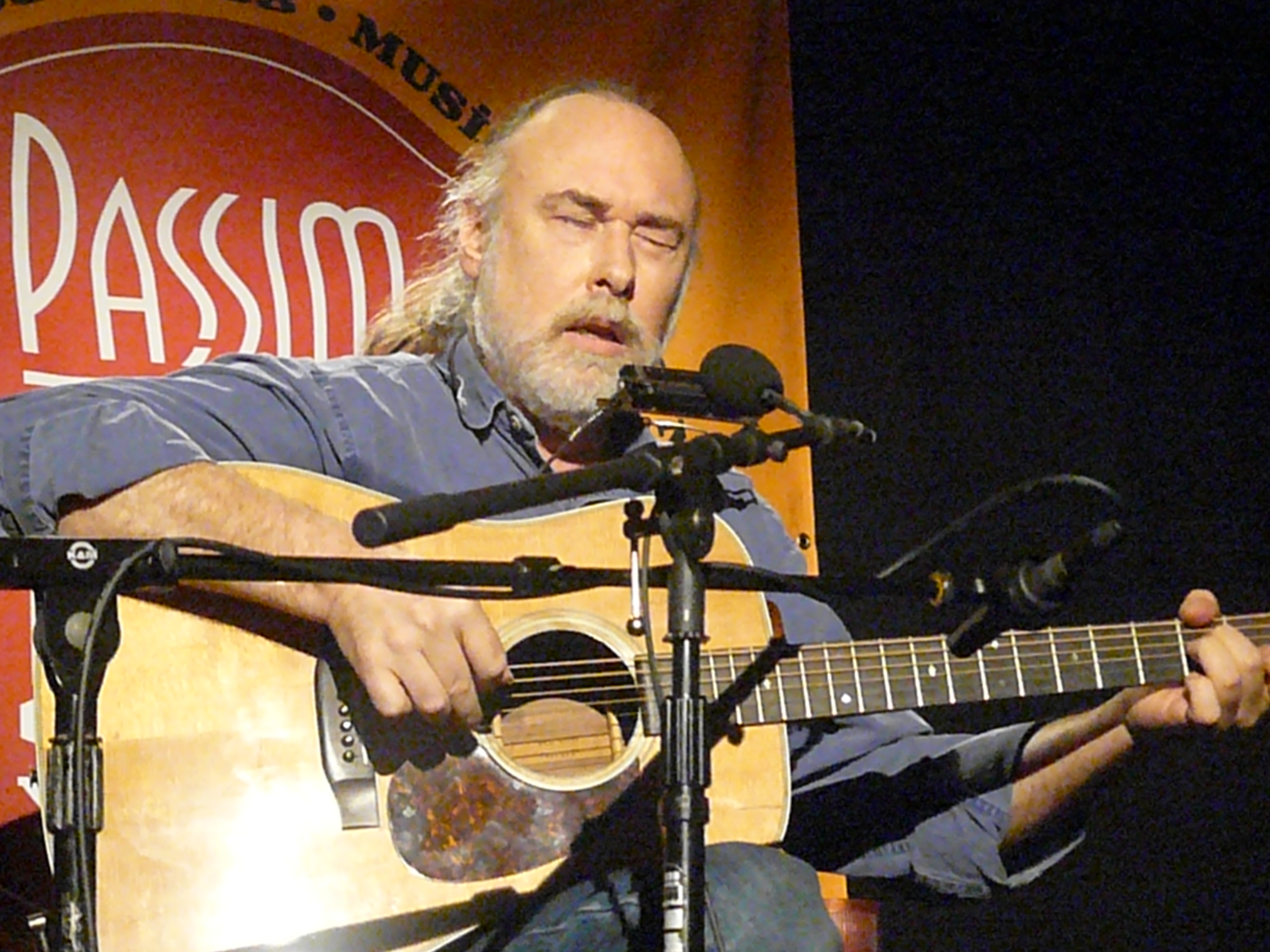
- Bartley performing in 2008

Background information
- Born: 1948 (age 76–77)
- Origin: Boston
- Genres: Folk, blues, roots
- Occupation: Singer-songwriter
- Instrument(s): Guitar, harmonica
- Years active: 1969–present
- Labels: Waterbug, Swallowtail, Magic Crow
- Website: www.geoffbartley.com

Geoff Bartley (born 1948) is an American acoustic guitarist and singer-songwriter based in Boston, Massachusetts. Since 1994, Bartley has played guitar regularly alongside Tom Paxton.

== Early life and influences ==
Geoff Bartley was born in New York City in 1948 and grew up on the eastern shore of Maryland. His mother played piano and his father, a doctor, played clarinet. He grew up surrounded by classical music. In fourth grade, Bartley began to study clarinet, and in 1963 began playing the acoustic guitar. In 1967, he moved to Boston to attend Boston University. He has also lived in Nevada, Colorado, Connecticut, New Hampshire and Pennsylvania.

Among his influences, Bartley cites original pre-war acoustic blues players and singers such as Lightnin’ Hopkins, Robert Johnson, Bessie Smith, and Blind Willie McTell, as well as later musicians, such as Bob Dylan, Tom Rush, Bonnie Raitt, and Dave Van Ronk.

== Career ==
Bartley performed his first professional gig in 1970 at a Boston coffeehouse. By 1973, he was able to support himself financially playing in bars and coffee houses, and he toured nationally for the next fifteen years. During the 1980s, Bartley participated in the Fast Folk Music Cooperative. Since 1994, he has regularly accompanied folk musician Tom Paxton. Bartley was involved in the creation of the 2004 Tom Paxton signature model Martin guitar.

=== Can Tab Lounge and the bluegrass connection ===
In 1991, Bartley began hosting a folk singer-songwriter open mic at the Can Tab Lounge in Cambridge on Monday evenings. The success of the folk open mic led the venue asked him in 1993 to host Tuesday evenings as well, and he decided to make that a bluegrass event. Bluegrass Tuesdays eventually became what musician Matt Glaser called "the epicenter of bluegrass in Boston." In 2016, the Boston Bluegrass Union recognized Bartley's contributions to bluegrass with its Industry Heritage Award.

=== Songwriting ===
Bartley's songs have been recorded by numerous artists and licensed for film and television. His song "Sunny Side of Town" won the 2015 Podunk Bluegrass Festival Songwriters Competition. His recordings Put the Big Stone Down (2009) and Mercy for the Dispossessed (2011) both reached number one on the international Folk DJ Radio chart. Through his open mics, he has been a mentor to many aspiring songwriters. The folk press has called him a world-class guitarist, a brilliant songwriter, and the prophet and spiritual godfather of the Boston folk scene.

=== Awards and recognition ===
The city of Cambridge, Massachusetts declared February 13, 2004 Geoff Bartley Day. In 2009, he was awarded the Jerry Christen Memorial Lifetime Achievement Award by the Boston Area Coffeehouse Association. In 2015, Bartley was the winner of the Podunk songwriting contest. He has won the New Hampshire Acoustic Guitar Contest twice, and won a guitar each year from 1984 to 1987 by four-second-place wins at the National Fingerstyle Guitar Championships in Winfield, Kansas.

== Discography ==
- Blues Beneath the Surface (1984)
- Interstates (1986)
- I Am the Heart (1989)
- One Kind Word (1998)
- Hear That Wind Howl (1999)
- Bones and Breath (with Timothy Mason) (2003)
- Interstates (2005)
- Blackbirds in the Pie (2008)
- Put The Big Stone Down (2010)
- Mercy for the Dispossessed (2011)
- Uncle Wiggly's Bicycle Ride (2015)
- Particles of Light (September 2016)
- The Ballad of Billy Bridger (2023)
