= Eliza Gilkyson =

American musician (born 1950)

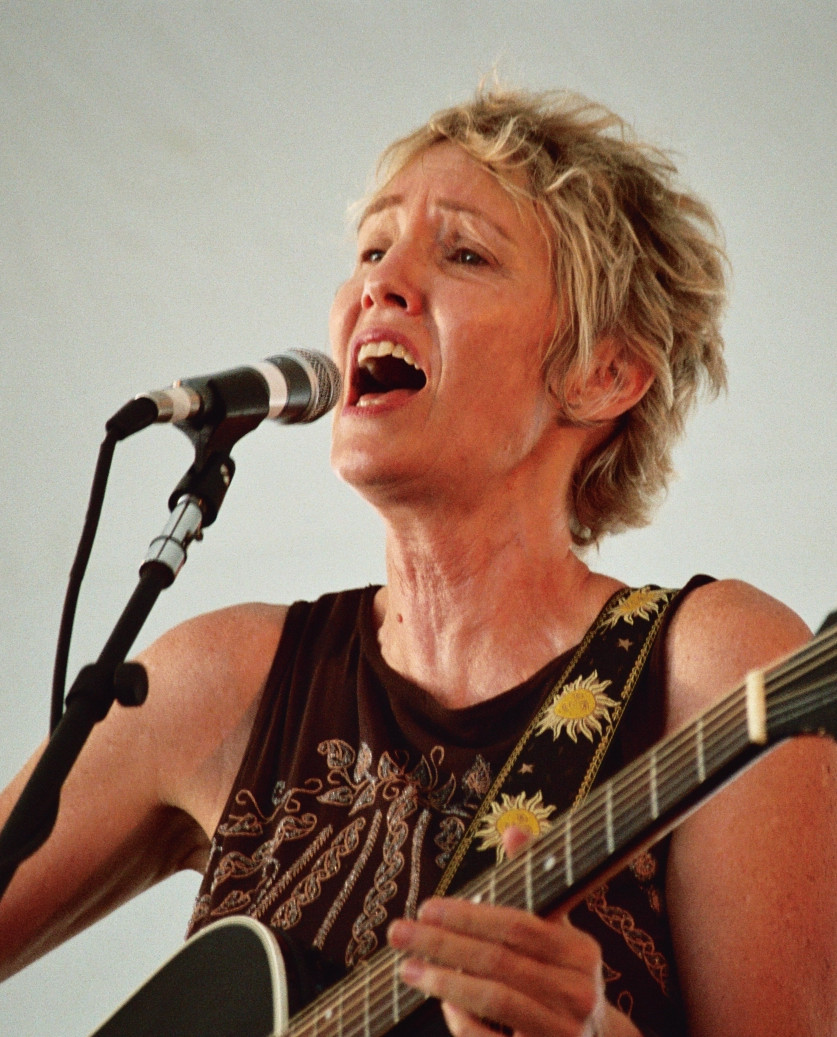
- Eliza Gilkyson in 2006

Background information
- Born: Eliza Gilkyson; August 24, 1950 (age 76); Hollywood, Los Angeles, California, U.S.
- Genres: Folk
- Occupation: musician
- Instrument: Guitar
- Years active: 1979–present
- Spouse: Robert Jensen
- Website: elizagilkyson.com

Eliza Gilkyson (born August 24, 1950, Hollywood, California) is an American folk musician based in Taos, New Mexico. Gilkyson is a two-time Grammy Award nominee, receiving a nomination for Best Contemporary Folk Album in 2004 and Best Folk Album in 2014.

== Personal life ==
Eliza's father was singer-songwriter Terry Gilkyson and her brother is Tony Gilkyson.

== Career ==
Gilkyson released Eliza '69, her first album, in 1969 while raising a family in Santa Fe, New Mexico. She didn't come out with her second, Love from the Heart, until ten years later. She moved to Austin, Texas, in 1981 and released the commercial album Pilgrims before moving to Los Angeles in 1987.

After a brief stint in Los Angeles, Gilkyson returned to New Mexico in the early 1990s, releasing several albums of original material. In 1993 she collaborated with New Age artist Andreas Vollenweider on his recording, Eolian Minstrel.

Gilkyson has been with Red House Records since 2000, although she also worked on three albums independently, recording on her own label, Realiza Records. In 2003 she was inducted into the Texas Music Hall of Fame. Her third album with Red House Records, Land of Milk and Honey was released in 2004 and was nominated for a Grammy. In 2005, she released Paradise Hotel with the song "Requiem" about the 2004 Indian Ocean earthquake and tsunami in December 2004. Coinciding with Hurricane Katrina's devastation of the Gulf Coast region in August 2005, this composition is a song of prayer and comfort. The same year Gilkyson was recognized with three Austin Music Awards and four Folk Alliance Music Awards, one of which was for her song "Man of God" about the Bush administration.

In 2008, Gilkyson's album Beautiful World was released, again on Red House Records. The songs vary from pop to folk, ranging from intimate ballads to rallying cries against imperialism. In 2010, she collaborated on a new album entitled Red Horse with two of her Red House Records label-mates John Gorka and Lucy Kaplansky.

In 2011, Gilkyson released Roses at the End of Time and in 2014 released The Nocturne Diaries, which was nominated for a Grammy for best Folk Album. Both CDs were recorded at her home with the help of her son and co-producer Cisco Ryder.

In 2020, Gilkyson released 2020, described as "a collection of politically charged anthems."

Gilkyson continues to tour about 150 dates per year in the United States and overseas, as well as hosting annual songwriting workshops near Taos, New Mexico.

In June 2026, CBS News included her song When You Walk On in its list of the 250 essential American songs of the past 250 years.

== Discography ==
=== Albums ===
- 1969 – Eliza '69, Mont Clare Records (out of print)
- 1979 – Love from the Heart, as Lisa Gilkyson, Helios Records (out of print)
- 1982 – No Commercial Potential, as Lisa Gilkyson, Wind River Productions (cassette - out of print)
- 1984 – Eliza Gilkyson / Mark Hallman, SouthCoast Records (EP - out of print)
- 1987 – Pilgrims, Gold Castle Records
- 1988 – Legends of Rainmaker, Gold Castle Records (out of print)
- 1992 – Through the Looking Glass, Private Music (out of print but may be reissued in the future)
- 1993 – Eolian Minstrel by Andreas Vollenweider, vocals, acoustic guitar, and lyrical co-author, although Gilkyson's credit only appears in the liner notes, Capitol Records
- 1994 – Undressed, Realiza Records (out of print)
- 1997 – Redemption Road, Silverwave Records
- 1999 – Misfits, Realiza Records
- 2000 – Hard Times in Babylon, Red House Records
- 2001 – More Than a Song, with Ad Vanderveen and Iain Matthews, Perfect Pitch Productions
- 2002 – Lost and Found, Red House Records
- 2004 – Land of Milk and Honey, Red House Records
- 2005 – RetroSpecto, Realiza Records
- 2005 – Paradise Hotel, Red House Records
- 2007 – Your Town Tonight, Red House Records
- 2008 – Beautiful World, Red House Records
- 2010 – Red Horse with John Gorka and Lucy Kaplansky, Red House Records
- 2011 – Roses At The End Of Time, Red House Records
- 2014 – The Nocturne Diaries, Red House Records
- 2018 – Secularia, Red House Records
- 2020 – 2020, Red House Records
- 2022 – Songs from the River Wind, Howling Dog Records
- 2023 – Home, Realiza
- 2025 - Dark Ages, Realiza

=== DVDs ===
- 2008 – Live From Austin, Texas

== Personal life ==
Gilkyson is the daughter of songwriter and folk musician Terry Gilkyson and his wife, Jane. Her brother is guitarist Tony Gilkyson, who played with the Los Angeles–based bands Lone Justice and X. She is married to scholar and author Robert Jensen.

== See also ==
- Music of Austin
