= Cliff Eberhardt =

American folk singer-songwriter

- Born: January 7, 1954 (age 72); Berwyn, Pennsylvania, United States
- Genre: Folk
- Occupation: Singer-songwriter
- Instruments: Vocals, guitar

Cliff Eberhardt (born January 7, 1954, in Berwyn, Pennsylvania) is an American folk singer-songwriter. He is a founding member of the Fast Folk Music Cooperative in New York City. Eberhardt joined Red House Records in 1997 and has recorded five albums for the label, the most recent in 2009, 500 Miles: The Blue Rock Sessions. In 2011, he released an acoustic album of Doors songs, All Wood and Doors, with fellow musician James Lee Stanley on Beechwood Recordings. Also that year, he contributed a cover to Nod to Bob II, a Red House compilation honoring Bob Dylan on his 70th birthday.

== Early life ==
Eberhardt was born on January 7, 1954, in Berwyn, Pennsylvania, near Philadelphia. His family had a musical background, and he began playing guitar at an early age. At 15, he and his brother Geoff began touring as a duo. In 1976, he moved to Carbondale, Illinois, attracted by the local music scene, spent some time in Colorado, and then in 1978 relocated to New York City, where he became part of the second folk and acoustic music revival. Among the other artists performing in Lower Manhattan coffeehouses at the time were John Gorka, Shawn Colvin, Lucy Kaplansky and David Massengill.

== Discography ==
=== Albums ===
- The Long Road (1990)
- Now You Are My Home (1993)
- Mona Lisa Cafe (1995)
- Twelve Songs of Good and Evil (1997)
- Borders (1999)
- School for Love (2002)
- The High Above and the Down Below (2007)
- 500 Miles: The Blue Rock Sessions (2009)
- Shrew Songs: Music for The Taming of the Shrew (2012)
- 18 Essential Songs 1990 - 2009 (2020)
- Knew Things (2021)

with James Lee Stanley

- All Wood and Doors (2011)

=== Compilation albums ===
- A Nod to Bob 2: An Artist's Tribute to Bob Dylan (2011) (Track 11: "Just Like Tom Thumb's Blues")

=== Singles ===
- "The Long Road'" (1990)
