= John Gorka =

American singer-songwriter (born 1958)

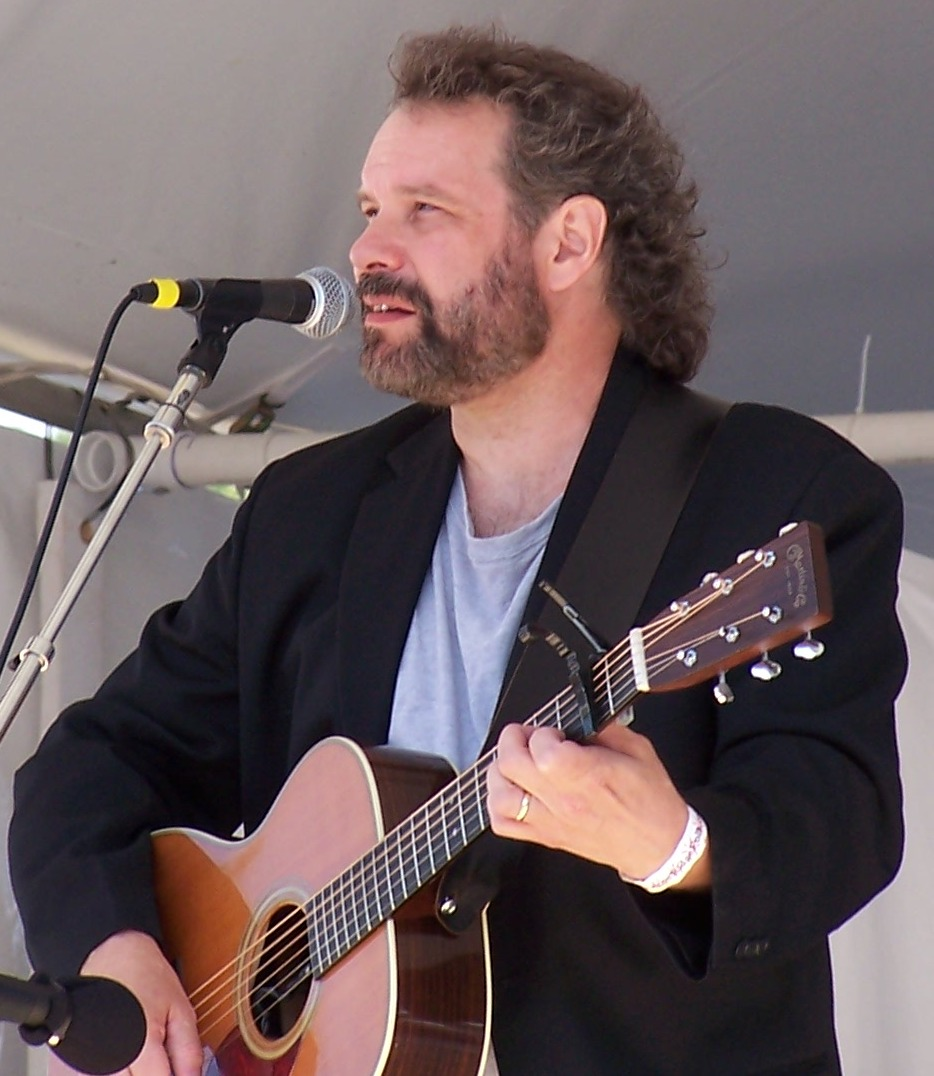
- John Gorka at the Falcon Ridge Folk Festival, 2004

Background information
- Born: July 27, 1958 (age 68); Colonia, New Jersey, U.S.
- Genre: Folk
- Occupations: Songwriter, musician
- Instruments: Vocals, guitars, piano
- Years active: 1980s–present
- Labels: Windham Hill, High Street, Red House
- Website: www.johngorka.com

John Gorka (born July 27, 1958) is an American singer-songwriter. In 1991, Rolling Stone magazine called him "the preeminent male singer-songwriter of what has been dubbed the New Folk Movement."

== Personal life ==
Gorka was raised in the Colonia section of Woodbridge Township, New Jersey, where he attended Colonia High School.

He studied philosophy and history at Moravian College in Bethlehem, Pennsylvania and graduated from there in 1980.

He moved to Minnesota in January of 1996. As of 2005, he was residing in the St. Croix Valley area near Saint Paul, Minnesota.

His son Joe Gorka released his first EP, called Evergreen, on June 1, 2025.

== Career ==
Gorka formed the Razzy Dazzy Spasm Band with Doug Anderson and Russ Rentler, which would also include guitarist Richard Shindell. After graduating from Moravian, he began performing solo at Godfrey Daniels coffee house in South Bethlehem as the opening act for various musicians including Nanci Griffith, Bill Morrissey, Claudia Schmidt and Jack Hardy. In 1984, Gorka was one of six winners chosen from the finalists in the New Folk competition at the Kerrville Folk Festival. Since then he has regularly toured Europe and North America.

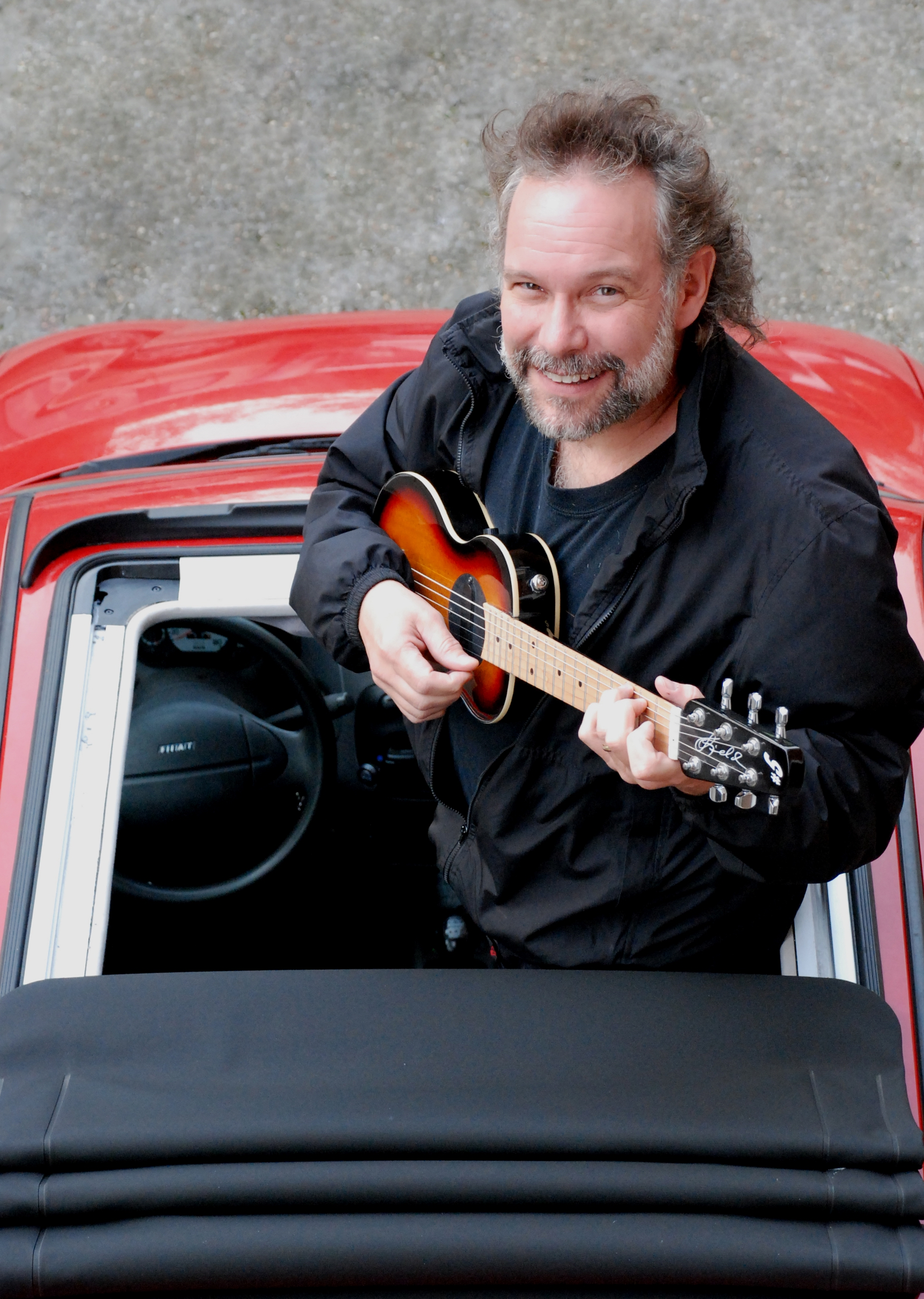
John Gorka, 2008

In 1987, Gorka recorded his first album, I Know. It was released by Red House—beginning a long association with that label. Although his next five albums were distributed by Windham Hill and High Street, he returned to Red House with 1998's After Yesterday and produced nine albums with them over the next twenty-seven years—most recently unentitled (2025).

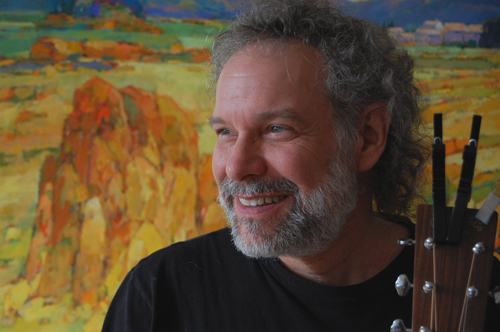
John Gorka in The Hague, Netherlands

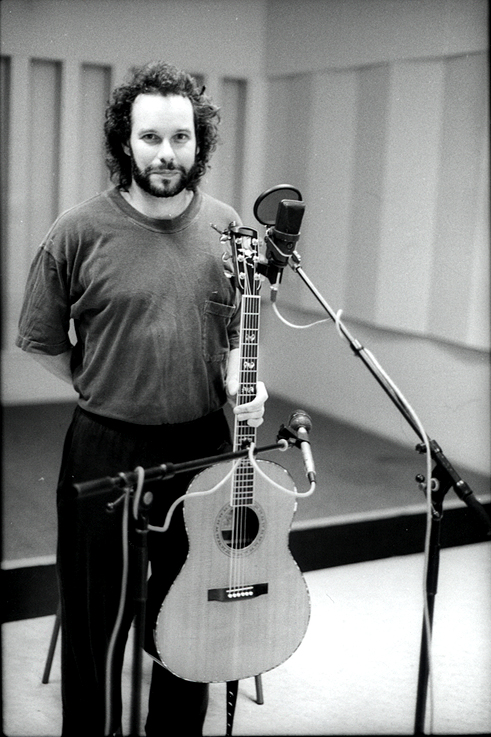
John Gorka at VPRO Studio, Hilversum

He has appeared with artists such as Suzanne Vega, Shawn Colvin, Michael Manring, Christine Lavin, Dave Van Ronk, Cliff Eberhardt, David Massengill, Frank Christian, Antje Duvekot, Meg Hutchinson, and Lucy Kaplansky. He joined with Kaplansky and Eliza Gilkyson to form the folk supergroup Red Horse in 2010, touring together and releasing a self-titled album on which they performed each other's compositions. Red Horse toured through July 2014.

== Discography ==
=== Studio albums ===
- I Know (Red House, 1987)
- Land of the Bottom Line (Windham Hill/High Street, 1990)
- Jack's Crows (Windham Hill/High Street, 1991)
- Temporary Road (Windham Hill/High Street, 1992)
- Out of the Valley (Windham Hill/High Street, 1994)
- Between Five and Seven (Windham Hill/High Street, 1996)
- After Yesterday (Red House, 1998)
- The Company You Keep (Red House, 2001)
- Old Futures Gone (Red House, 2003)
- Writing in the Margins (Red House, 2006)
- So Dark You See (Red House, 2009)
- Red Horse (Red House, 2010) with Lucy Kaplansky and Eliza Gilkyson
- Bright Side Of Down (Red House, 2014)
- Before Beginning (The Unreleased I Know - Nashville, 1985) (Red House, 2016)
- True in Time (Red House, 2018)
- unentitled (Red House, 2025)

=== Other releases ===
Promotional EPs

- Motor Folkin' (Windham Hill/High Street, 1994)

Remix albums

- Before Beginning: The Unreleased I Know - Nashville, 1985 (Red House, 2016) (early version of I Know)

DVD

- The Gypsy Life (AIX Records, 2007)

Live CD/DVDs

- Live at Tales from the Tavern (CD/DVD) (2013)
- Live at Tales from the Tavern II (CD/DVD) (2018)

Compilation albums

- Pure John Gorka (Windham Hill, 2006)

On various artists compilations

- See various issues of Fast Folk Musical Magazine for early recordings.
- "I Saw a Stranger with Your Hair" on Legacy: A Collection of New Folk Music (Windham Hill, 1989)
- "Christmas Bells", on A Winter's Solstice, Vol. III (Windham Hill, 1990)
- "Love Minus Zero/No Limit" on A Tribute to Bob Dylan, Vol. 2 (SIS, 1994)
- "The Gypsy Life" on The Live from Mountain Stage, Vol. 8 (Blue Plate, 1995)
- "Love is Our Cross to Bear" on KGSR Broadcasts Vol. 3 (KGSR, 1995)
- "The Water is Wide" on Where Have All the Flowers Gone: The Songs of Pete Seeger (Wundertüte Musik, 1998)
- "Sweet Love" on "Treasures Left Behind: Remembering Kate Wolf" (Red House, 1998)
- "Bracero" on What's That I Hear?: The Songs of Phil Ochs (Sliced Bread, 1998)
- "Out of My Mind" on When October Goes : Autumn Love Songs (Philo, 1998)
- "Thirsty Boots" (Eric Andersen) on Bleecker Street: Greenwich Village in the 1960s (Astor Place Records, 1999)
- "Girl from the North Country" on A Nod to Bob: An Artists' Tribute to Bob Dylan on His 60th Birthday (Red House, 2001)
- "Do La Lay", "Things We've Handed Down" and others on Down at the Sea Hotel (La Montagne Secrète, 2007)
