= Dirty Linen (magazine) =

By-gone American bi-monthly magazine covering folk music

- Editor: Paul Hartman
- Categories: Music magazine Folk music
- Frequency: bi-monthly
- Founded: 1983 as Fairport Fanatics; 1987 as Dirty Linen
- Final issue: Spring 2010
- Company: Dirty Linen, Ltd./Visionation, Inc.
- Country: United States
- Based in: Baltimore, Maryland
- Website: dirtynelson.com
- ISSN: 1047-4315

Dirty Linen was a bi-monthly magazine of folk and world music based in Baltimore, Maryland, US. The magazine ceased publication in the spring of 2010. The magazine offered extensive reviews of folk music recordings, videos, books, and concerts as well as in depth profiles of musical artists and venues. They also maintained a schedule of concerts and festivals of folk music performances in North America in their "gig guide" which was available within the magazine or through their web site. Other features included, "The Horse Trader" classified ads, and a "Wireless" discussion of whats on the air waves.

== History ==
Dirty Linen originated in 1983 as a publication titled Fairport Fanatics, a fan magazine for the British band Fairport Convention created by T.J. McGrath of Fairfield, Connecticut. In 1987 Paul Hartman took over as editor and publisher, renamed the magazine Dirty Linen. "Dirty Linen" was the title of a traditional tune, arranged as an instrumental by Dave Swarbrick on Fairport Convention's 1970 album, Full House. The publication expanded its scope to cover genres of rooted music from many countries and cultures.

Based in Baltimore, Maryland, the magazine grew with direction from Hartman and his wife, Susan, who also served as co-editor of the magazine for many years. The photocopied fanzine became a glossy color publication in the early 1990s. Dirty Linen began international distribution and gained sales in North American chains such as Borders Books & Music, Barnes & Noble, and Chapters.

=== 2007 merger with VisioNation ===
In September 2007, Dirty Linen announced a merger with VisioNation, Inc., publishers of Blues Revue and the e-zines BluesWax and FolkWax. The merger was greeted enthusiastically by both parties who announced plans for new projects for Dirty Linen such as the inclusion of a sampler CD for subscribers, and planned growth for all four of VisioNation's roots music publications, including entry into radio and cable markets and sponsorship of music festivals.

In April 2010, Paul and Sue Hartman left Dirty Linen and VisioNation. Dirty Linen canceled their March/April and May/June 2010 issues.

VisioNation, Ltd., was an Iowa entity established August 13, 1999. Chip Eagle (né Charles Arthur Eagle, Jr.; born 1959) was president. The Secretary of State of Iowa VisioNation, Ltd., administratively dissolved VisioNation, Ltd., August 6, 2010. Chip's father, Charles Arthur Eagle (1936–1996), had been vice president of marketing for Look magazine before it ceased publication in 1971.

== Writers ==
A number of writers for the magazine also provide music content elsewhere on the web:

- Kerry Dexter
- Steve Ide
- Anil Prasad (former writer) now runs Innerviews and is a contributing editor for Guitar Player.
- Chris Nickson
- Bill Nevins
- Paul Hartman (editor)
- Duck Baker
- Cliff Furnald (former writer) now runs Roots World, Hollow Ear, and CD Roots
- Chris Kocher (né Christopher Kocher; born 1973) writes for the Press & Sun-Bulletin of Binghamton, New York, and has a blog on the paper's website.
