= High Street Records =

American record label

- Founded: 1990s
- Country of origin: United States

High Street Records was a subsidiary label of Windham Hill Records from about 1990 to 1997. While Windham Hill emphasized instrumental work in the new age music genre, High Street focused on rock and folk oriented performers.

Notable acts who recorded for the label include Steve Morse, John Gorka, Pierce Pettis, Patty Larkin, The Subdudes, Downy Mildew, and Dots Will Echo. Several singer-songwriters associated with High Street appeared on the 1989 Windham Hill compilation, Legacy: A Collection of New Folk Music and the 1992 follow-up on High Street, Legacy II: A Collection of Singer-songwriters.

== See also ==
- List of record labels
