= Sing Out! =

Defunct American folk music journal

- Sing Out! Volume 50 No. 2 (Summer 2006), cover, featuring Dar Williams
- Editor: Mark Moss
- Categories: Music magazines
- Frequency: Quarterly
- Circulation: ~12,000
- First issue: May 1950
- Final issue: Spring 2014
- Company: Sing Out! Corporation
- Country: United States
- Based in: Bethlehem, Pennsylvania
- Language: English
- Website: www.singout.org
- ISSN: 0037-5624

Sing Out! was a quarterly journal of folk music and folk songs that was published from May 1950 through spring 2014. It was originally based in New York City, with a national circulation of approximately 10,000 by 1960.

== Background ==
Sing Out! was the primary publication of the tax exempt not-for-profit educational corporation of the same name. According to the organization's website, "Sing Out!'s mission is to preserve and support the cultural diversity and heritage of all traditional and contemporary folk musics, and to encourage making folk music a part of our everyday lives." Irwin Silber was an important co-founder along with Pete Seeger and was the magazine's long-time editor from 1951 to 1967. Its final editor and executive director, since 1983, was Mark D. Moss. The editors applied a very broad definition of folk music including material from contemporary singer-songwriters, Americana, roots, blues, bluegrass, and world music.

Sing Out! began under a different name, People's Songs which published "politically charged...civil rights songs, songs of peace and traditional ballads". Because it was committed to being a non-commercial magazine, in 1948, due to financial difficulties, People's Songs was forced to close. However after some restructuring, the first issue of Sing Out! was published in May 1950.

One defining feature of the magazine was the inclusion of 15 or more songs with lyrics and music within the pages of each issue—supplemented with an illustrative CD from 2001 until it ceased publication in 2014. The magazine also contained in-depth articles profiling musicians and musical traditions, "teach-ins," reviews of recordings and print publications, a comprehensive festival and camp listing, and columns covering topics such as songwriting, storytelling, children's music, and the folk process.

The corporate headquarters of Sing Out! were located in Bethlehem, Pennsylvania, which is also home to the Sing Out! Resource Center. The magazine was distributed by mail subscriptions and could be found in some North American bookstores and libraries.

== Sing Out! publications ==
In addition to the quarterly magazine, the corporation also offered an extensive mail order catalog of printed material on folk-music and folklore. The catalog included other Sing Out! publications, such as the folk music fake book, Rise Up Singing.

== The Sing Out! Resource Center ==
The Sing Out! Resource Center (SORCe) is a collection of recordings, photos, books, periodicals and other items. It is located in Bethlehem, Pennsylvania.

== Sing Out! Radio Magazine ==
Even after the magazine's print publication ceased, the Sing Out! Radio Magazine has continued as a weekly syndicated radio program featuring songs, news and interviews with musicians. The show is hosted by Tom Druckenmiller.
