= Lucy Kaplansky =

American folk musician

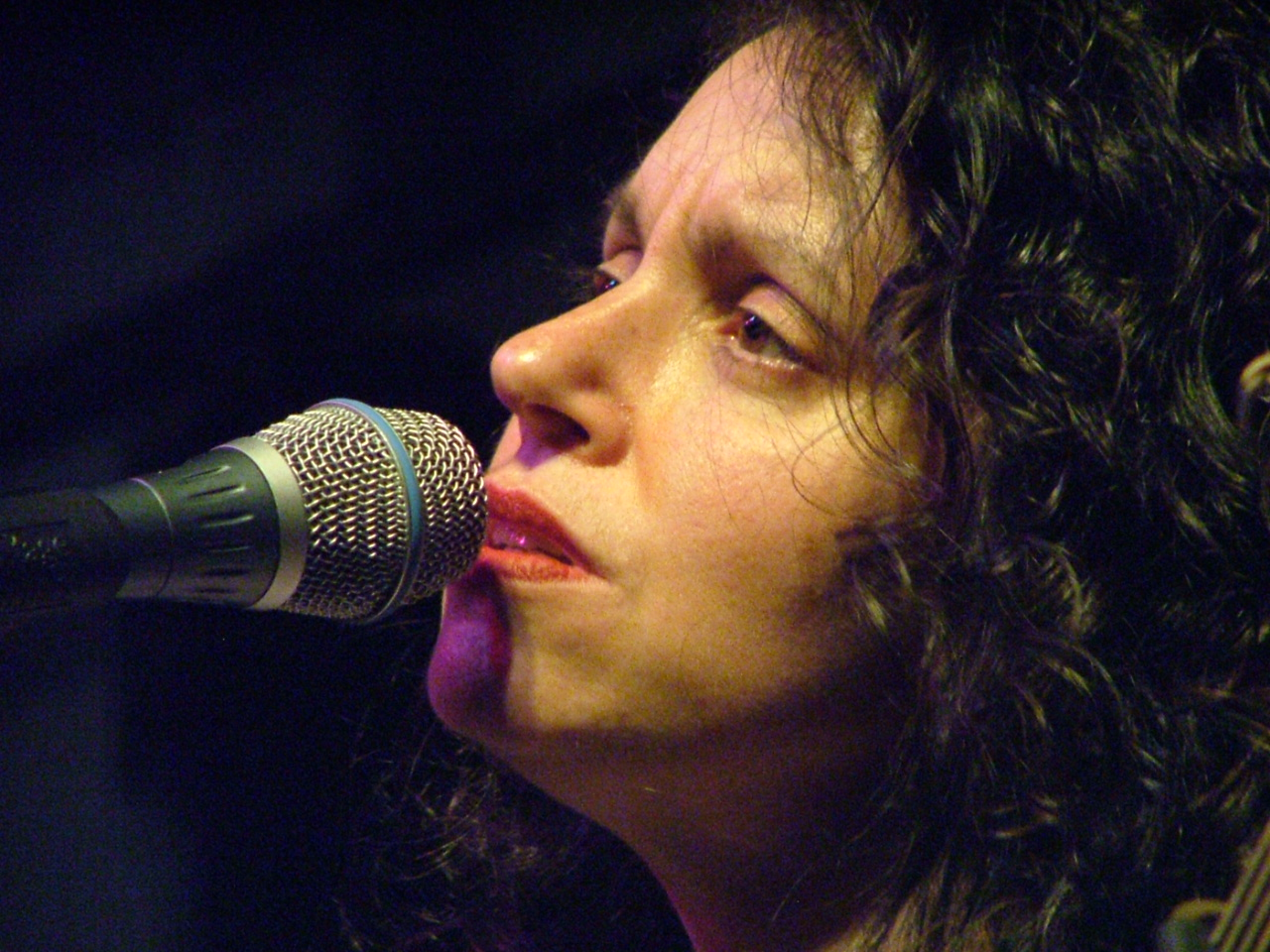
- Kaplansky in 2006

Background information
- Born: Lucy Kaplansky; February 16, 1960 (age 66)
- Origin: Chicago, Illinois, U.S.
- Genres: Folk
- Occupation: Singer-songwriter
- Instruments: Vocals, guitar, piano, mandolin
- Years active: 1978–present
- Labels: Red House, Razor & Tie
- Website: www.lucykaplansky.com

Lucy Kaplansky (born February 16, 1960) is an American folk musician based in New York City. Kaplansky has a PhD in clinical psychology from Yeshiva University and plays guitar, mandolin, and piano.

== Life and career ==
Kaplansky was originally from Chicago; her father was the noted mathematician Irving Kaplansky (1917–2006). Later, she would sometimes perform math-related songs composed by her father, who was also an accomplished pianist. At the age of 18, she decided not to go to college, but moved to New York City, where she became involved in the city's folk music scene, particularly around Greenwich Village, where she played with, among others, Suzanne Vega, Shawn Colvin and Richard Shindell.

In 1983, she decided to become a psychologist, enrolling at Yeshiva University. She continued playing music while pursuing her PhD, and began to have some success as part of a duo with Colvin. When they began to attract record company interest, Kaplansky declined, choosing instead to set up a private practice and become a staff psychologist at a New York hospital. For several years, she concentrated largely on this work, and played little in the way of concerts. She still did some session work, such as singing backing vocals in the studio for Suzanne Vega.

By the early 1990s, she found herself increasingly drawn back to music. Colvin, who by this time had experienced some commercial success, offered to produce an album for her. The result, The Tide, a mixture of her own songs and several covers, was released by Red House Records in 1994. At this time, she decided to give up her psychology practice and return to music full-time. More albums have followed.

In 1998, Kaplansky joined with Dar Williams and Richard Shindell to form the folk group Cry Cry Cry; they made an album and toured at length before going their separate ways. Her album Ten Year Night, released in 1999, won rave reviews and boosted her popularity, leading to performances on CBS-TV. Her album The Red Thread has a song about her experience of being a New Yorker on 9–11. In August 2001, Kaplansky had sung harmony with John Gorka in a concert on the World Trade Center plaza.

She is a semi-regular collaborator with John Gorka and appeared often with the late Nanci Griffith.

== Discography ==
=== Solo releases ===
- The Tide (1994, re-released 2005)
- Flesh and Bone (1996)
- Ten Year Night (1999)
- Every Single Day (2001)
- The Red Thread (2004)
- Over the Hills (2007)
- Kaplansky Squared (formerly Kaplansky sings Kaplansky) EP available at live shows (2011)
- Reunion (2012)
- Everyday Street (2018)
- Last Days of Summer (2022)

=== Collaborations ===
- The Song Project (1985) with Frank Christian, Tom Intondi, and Martha Hogen
- Cry Cry Cry (1998) with Dar Williams and Richard Shindell
- Red Horse (July 13, 2010) with John Gorka and Eliza Gilkyson
- Tomorrow You're Going (2014) with Richard Shindell (The Pine Hill Project)
- Live @ the Freight (2020; digital album) as a member of Cry Cry Cry

=== Appears on ===
- "It Ain't Me, Babe" on the album A Nod to Bob: An Artists' Tribute to Bob Dylan on His 60th Birthday (2001) – various Dylan songs by various artists. Similarly, "Every Grain of Sand" on Nod to Bob 2 (2011).
