= Singer-songwriter =

Musician who writes, composes, and sings their own material

A singer-songwriter is a musician who writes, composes, and performs their own musical material, including lyrics and melodies. In the United States, this category is built on the folk-acoustic tradition with a guitar, although this role has transmuted through different eras of popular music. Traditionally, these musicians would write and sing songs personal to them. Singer-songwriters often provide the sole musical accompaniment to an entire song. The piano is also an instrument of choice.

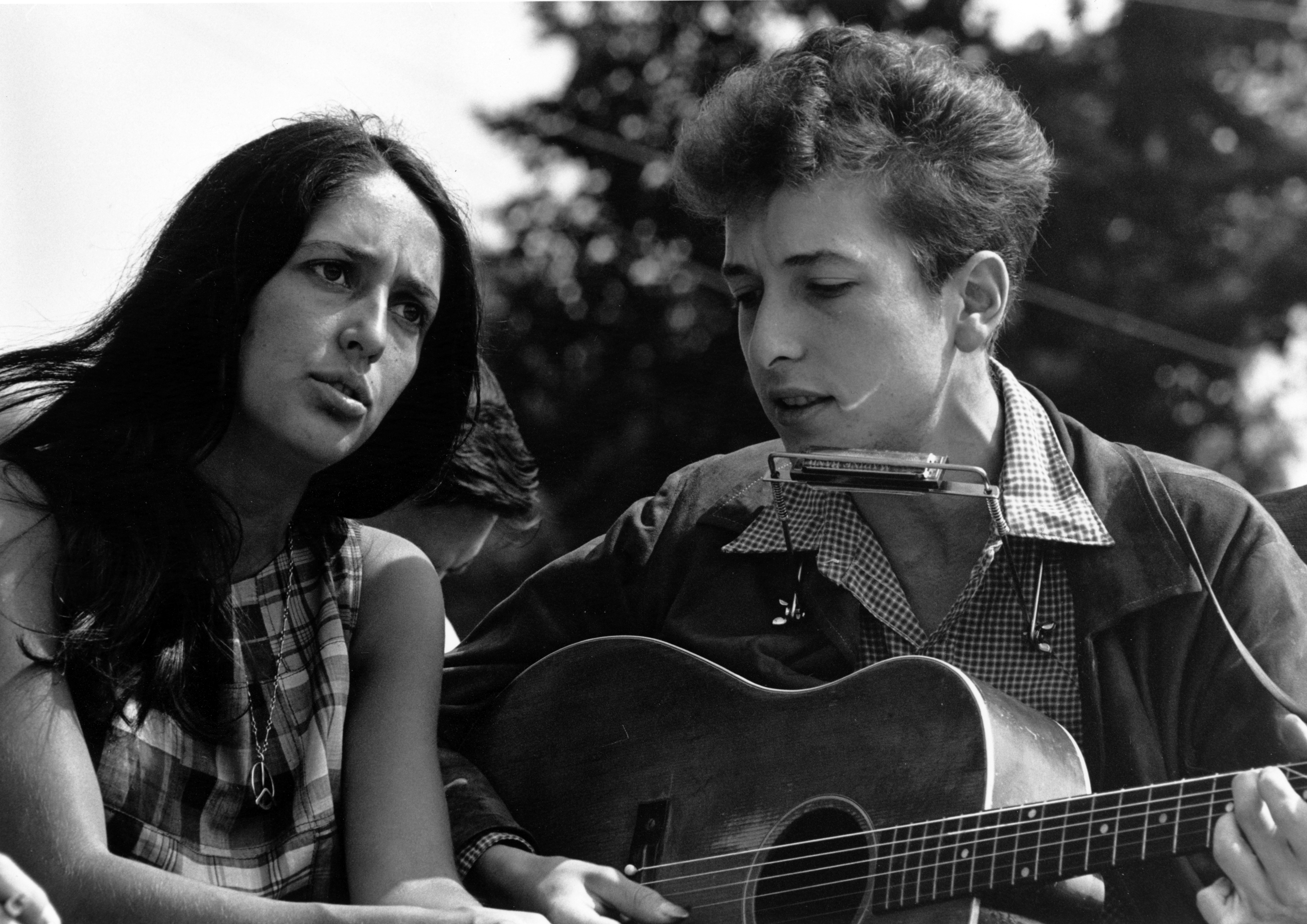
Bob Dylan with Joan Baez during the March on Washington in Washington, D.C., 1963

== Biography ==
The label "singer-songwriter" (or "song-writer/singer") is used by record labels and critics to define popular music artists who write and perform their own material, which is often self-accompanied – generally on acoustic guitar or piano. Such an artist performs the roles of composer, lyricist, vocalist, sometimes instrumentalist, and often self-manager. According to AllMusic, singer-songwriters' lyrics are often personal but veiled by elaborate metaphors and vague imagery, and their creative concern is to place emphasis on the song rather than on their performance of it. Most records by such artists have a similarly straightforward and spare sound that places emphasis on the song itself.

The term may also characterise songwriters in the rock, folk, country, and pop-music genres – including Henry Russell (1812–1900), Aristide Bruant (1851–1925), Hank Williams (1923–1953), and Buddy Holly (1936–1959). The phrase "singer-songwriter", recorded from 1949, came into popular usage from the 1960s onwards to describe songwriters who followed particular stylistic and thematic conventions, particularly lyrical introspection, confessional songwriting, mild musical arrangements, and an understated performing style. According to writer Larry David Smith, because it merged the roles of composer, writer, and singer, the popularity of the singer-songwriter phenomenon reintroduced the Medieval troubadour tradition of "songs with public personalities" after the Tin Pan Alley era in American popular music. Song topics of singer-songwriters from the American folk music revival include political protest, as in the case of Woody Guthrie (1912–1967) and Pete Seeger (1919–2014). According to the

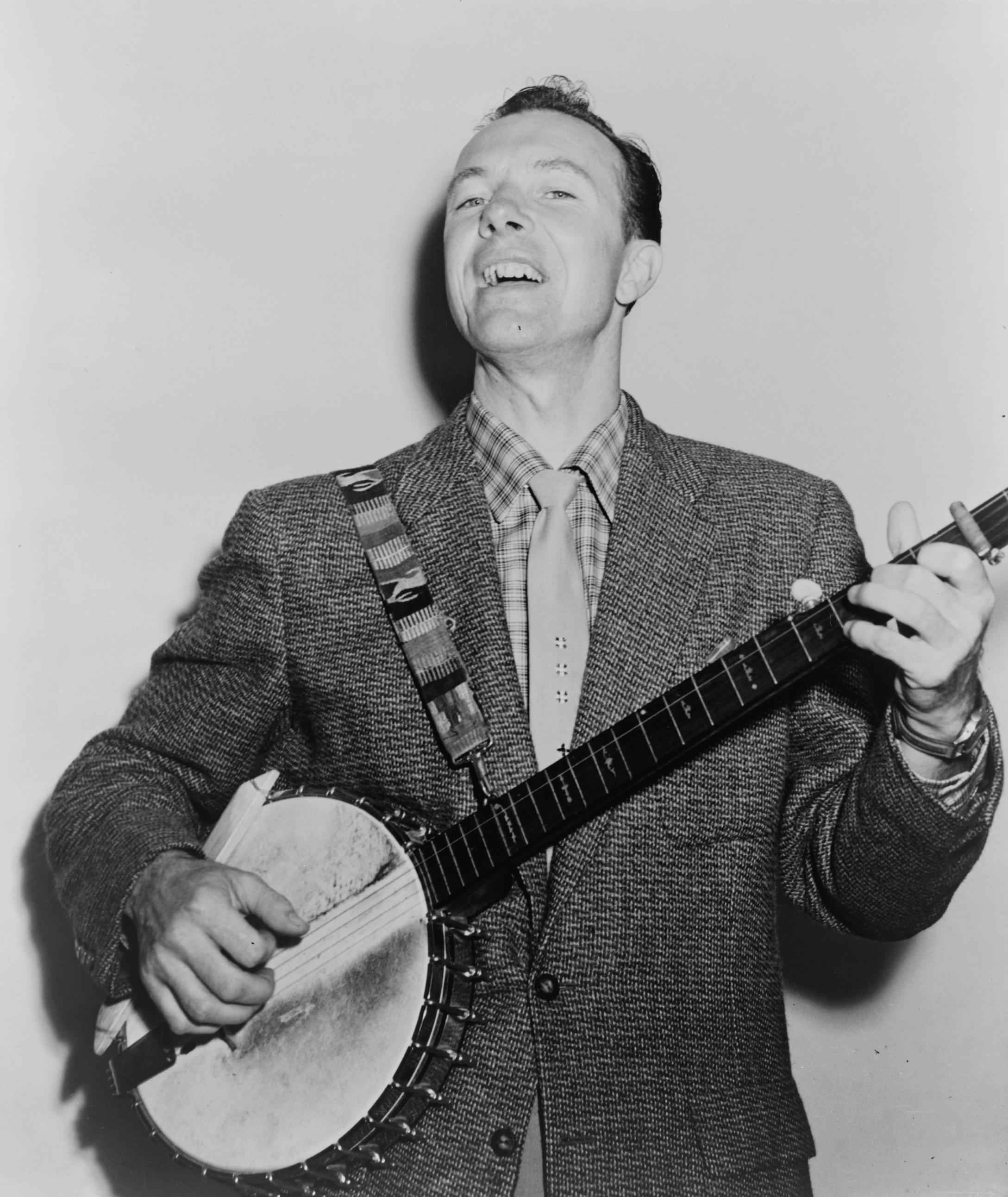
Singer-songwriter Pete Seeger of The Weavers, on banjo in 1955

Journal of Popular Music Studies, from the folk revival and onward into its permanence in pop music, the role of a singer-songwriter has involved several dimensions of creative identity:

The first aesthetic layer encourages songwriters to sing and perform their own works and to instill their own stylistic flavors into the song texts. The songwriters are not independent from the works once they are finished; rather, they enter into, activate, and authenticate the song texts through their vocal and musical performances. While the first layer does not always require the singer to be the songwriter, the second sociological layer not only fixates on the relationship between singer and songwriter (in this case, singer-songwriter is often hyphenated instead of using a slash between singer and songwriter), but also solicits more sociological agency aside from singing and songwriting, such as arranging, mixing, producing, collaborating, and media management. In other words, a singer-songwriter thus undergoes a thickening process involving two-layered voices, including performing stylistic persona, amassing other voices, and coordinating other sociological skills. This thickening process demonstrates the fluid, multiple, and heterogeneous voices underneath the singular authorial image, thus complicating the notion of authorship for singer-songwriters.

== History ==
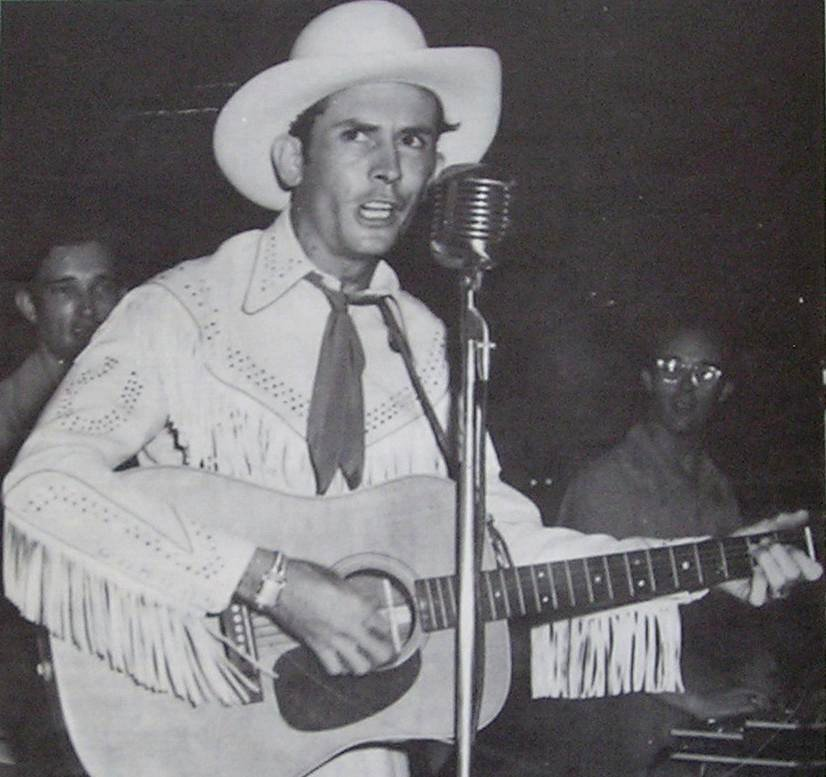
Hank Williams, 1951

The concept of a singer-songwriter can be traced to ancient bardic oral tradition, which has existed in various forms throughout the world. Poems would be performed as chant or song, sometimes accompanied by a harp or other similar instrument. After the invention of printing, songs would be written and performed by ballad sellers. Usually these would be versions of existing tunes and lyrics, which were constantly evolving. This developed into the singer-songwriting traditions of folk culture.

Traveling performers existed throughout Europe. Thus, the folklorist Anatole Le Braz gives a detailed account of one ballad singer, Yann Ar Minouz, who wrote and performed songs traveling through Brittany in the late nineteenth century and selling printed versions.

In large towns it was possible to make a living performing in public venues, and with the invention of phonographic recording, early singer-songwriters like Théodore Botrel, George M. Cohan, and Hank Williams became celebrities; radio further added to their public recognition and appeal. The growth of recorded music and radio also provided singer-songwriters with additional ways to distribute their performances and reach audiences beyond local venues.

During the period from the 1940s through the 1960s, sparked by the American folk music revival, young performers inspired by traditional folk music and groups like the Almanac Singers and the Weavers began writing and performing their own original material and creating their own musical arrangements.

In the early 21st century, the digital audio workstation GarageBand has been utilized by many aspiring singer-songwriters to compose and record music. Singer-songwriters who have composed music professionally with GarageBand include Erykah Badu (for her 2008 album New Amerykah Part One) and Bilal (for his 2010 album Airtight's Revenge).

== Traditions in different countries ==
=== North America, United Kingdom, and Ireland ===
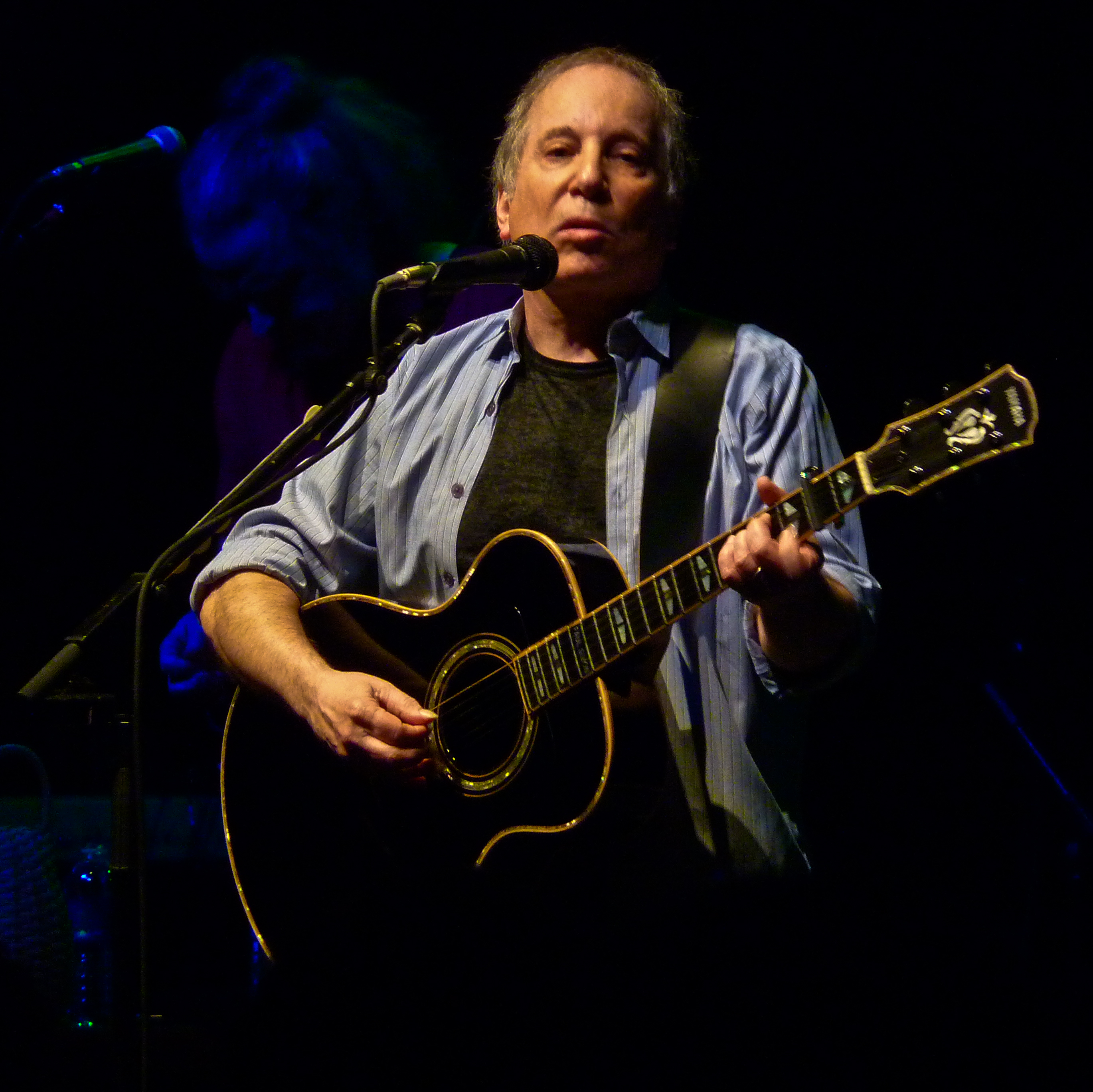
Paul Simon in concert, 2011

The term "singer-songwriter" in North America can be traced back to singers who developed works in the blues and folk music style. Early to mid-20th century American singer-songwriters include Lead Belly, Jimmie Rodgers, Blind Lemon Jefferson, T-Bone Walker, Blind Willie McTell, Lightnin' Hopkins, Son House, and Robert Johnson. In the 1940s and 1950s country singer-songwriters like Hank Williams became well known, as well as Woody Guthrie, and Pete Seeger, along with Ronnie Gilbert and Lee Hays and other members of the Weavers who performed their mostly topical works to an ever-growing wider audience. These proto-singer-songwriters were less concerned than today's singer-songwriters with the unadulterated originality of their music and lyrics, and would lift parts from other songs and play covers without hesitation. The tradition of writing topical songs (songs regarding specific issues of the day, such as Lead Belly's "Jim Crow Blues" or Guthrie's "Deportee (Plane Wreck at Los Gatos)") was established by this group of musicians. Singers like Seeger and Guthrie would attend rallies for labor unions, and so wrote many songs concerning the life of the working classes, and social protest; as did other folksingers like Josh White, Cisco Houston, Malvina Reynolds, Earl Robinson, Ewan MacColl, John Jacob Niles, and Doc Watson, while blues singers like Johnson and Hopkins wrote songs about their personal life experiences. This focus on social issues has greatly influenced the singer-songwriter genre. Additionally in the 1930s through the 1950s several jazz and blues singer-songwriters emerged like Hoagy Carmichael, Billie Holiday, Ray Charles, Harry Gibson, Peggy Lee, and Nina Simone, as well as in the rock n' roll genre from which emerged influential singer-songwriters Jerry Lee Lewis, Buddy Holly, Chuck Berry, Roy Orbison, Sam Cooke, Ritchie Valens, and Paul Anka. In the country music field, singer-songwriters like Hank Williams, Patsy Cline, Tammy Wynette, Loretta Lynn, George Jones, Merle Haggard, Roger Miller, Billy Edd Wheeler, and others emerged from the 1940s through the 1960s, often writing compelling songs about love relationships and other subjects.

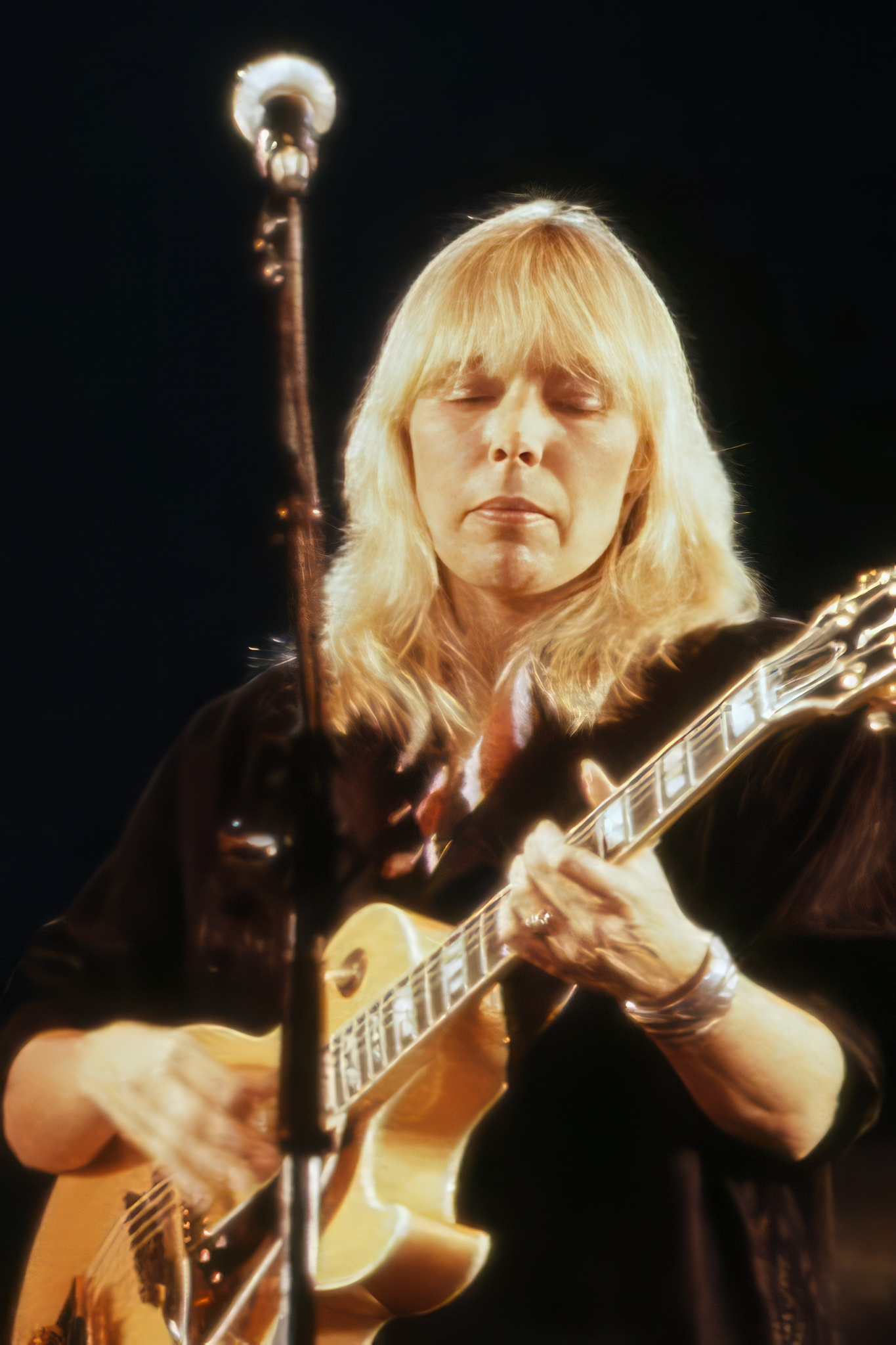
Joni Mitchell, 1983

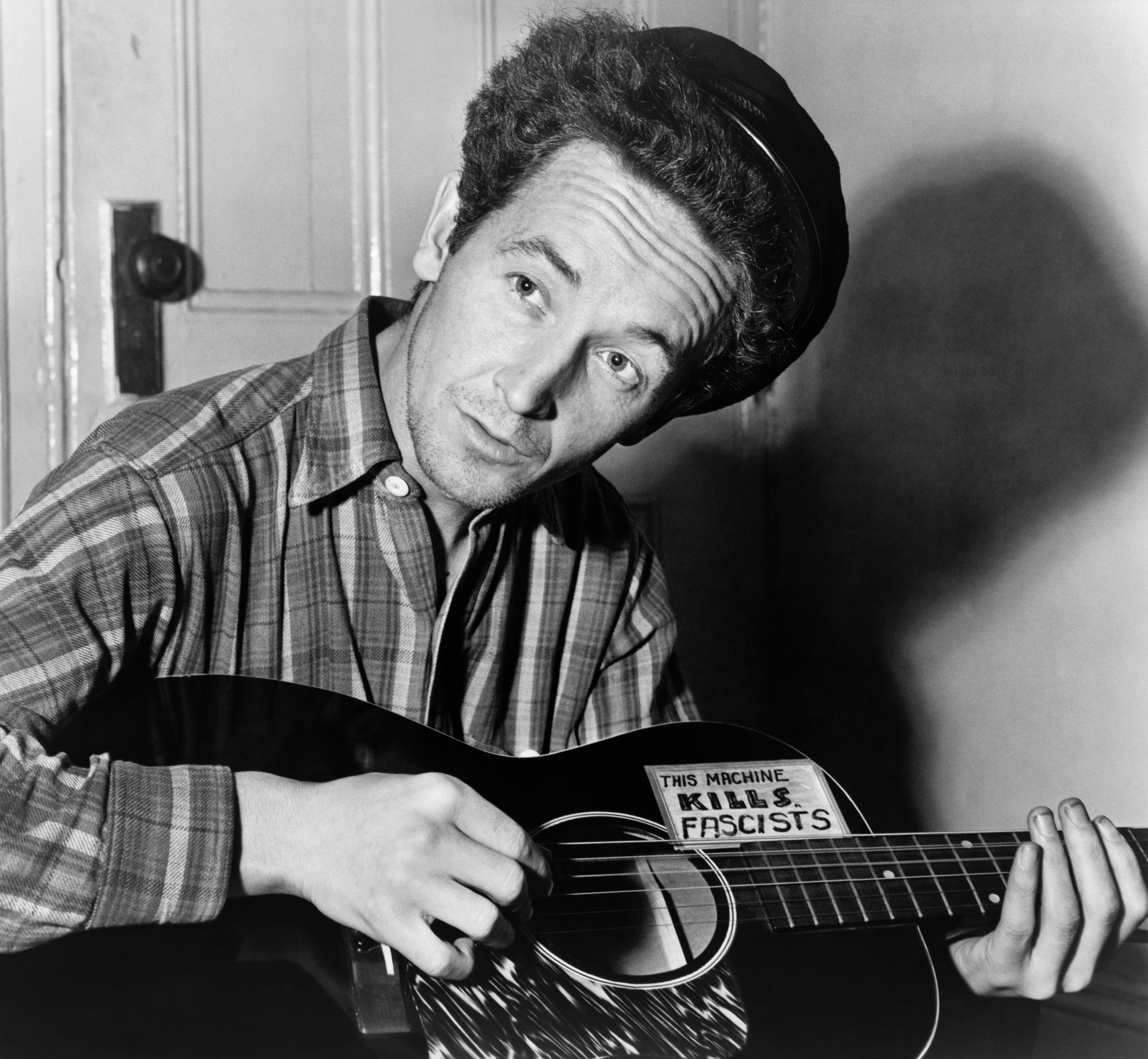
Woody Guthrie, 1943

The first popular recognition of the singer-songwriter in English-speaking North America and the United Kingdom occurred in the 1960s and early 1970s when a series of blues, folk and country-influenced musicians rose to prominence and popularity. These singer-songwriters included Bob Dylan, Neil Young, John Lennon, Van Morrison, Willie Nelson, Paul Simon, Leonard Cohen, Albert Hammond, Gordon Lightfoot, and Joni Mitchell. Artists who had been primarily songwriters, notably Carole King, Townes Van Zandt, and Neil Diamond, also began releasing work as performers. In contrast to the storytelling approach of most prior country and folk music, these performers typically wrote songs from a highly personal (often first-person), introspective point of view. The adjectives "confessional" and "sensitive" were often used (sometimes derisively) to describe singer-songwriter style.

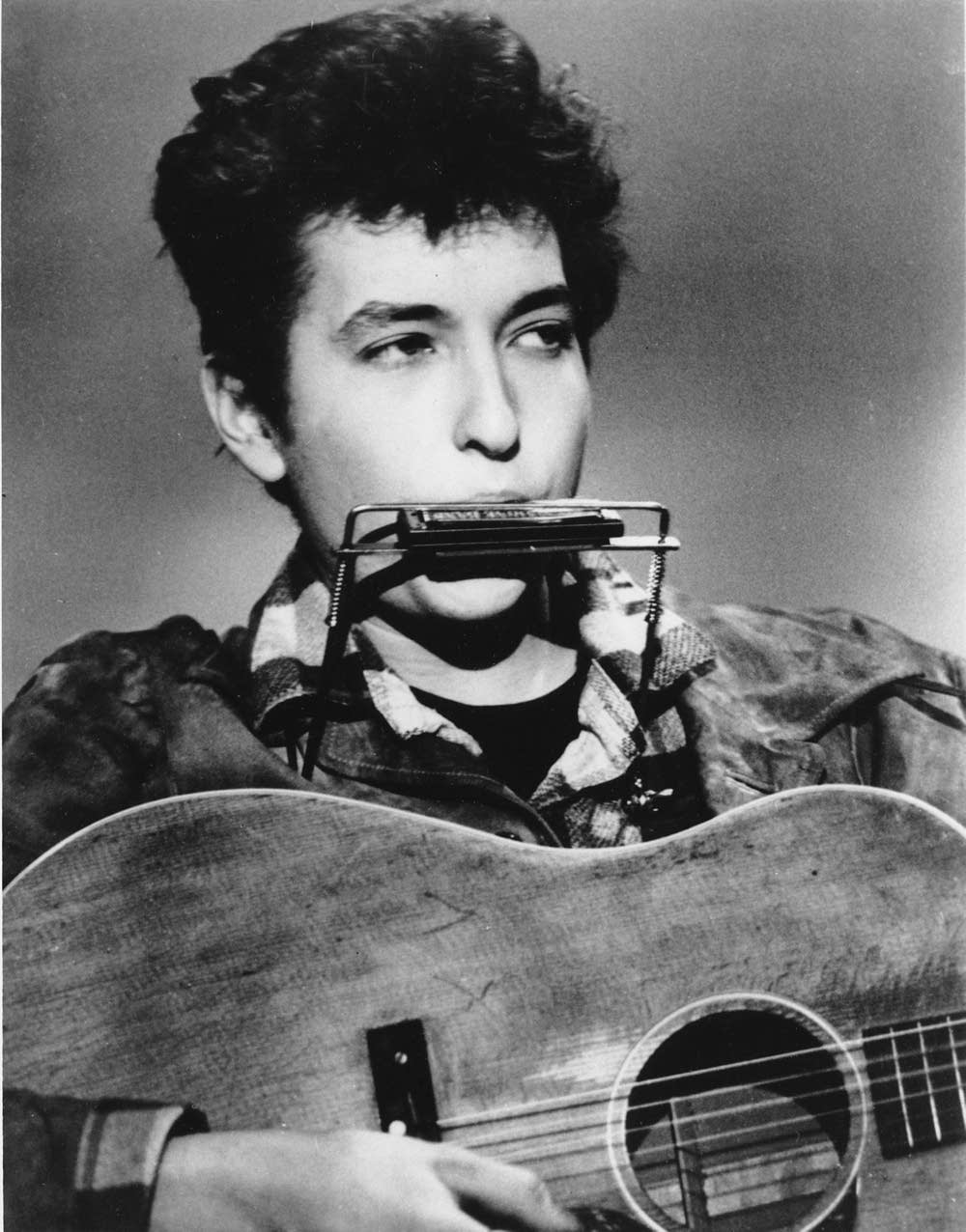
Bob Dylan, 1963

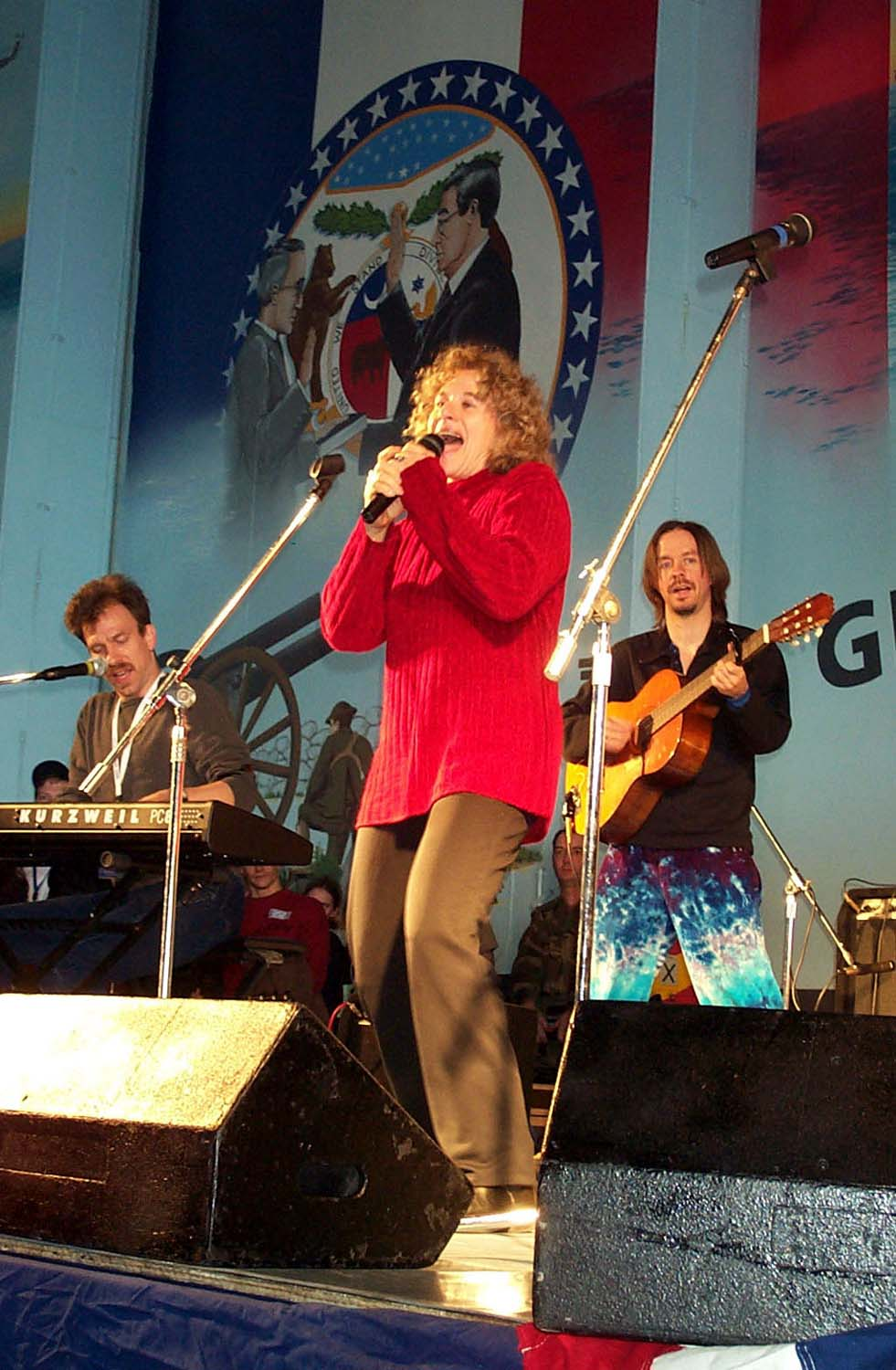
Carole King performing aboard USS Harry S. Truman in the Mediterranean in 2000

In the rock band era, members were not technically singer-songwriters as solo acts. However, many were singer-songwriters who created songs with other band members. Examples include Paul McCartney, John Lennon, George Harrison, Ringo Starr, Brian Wilson, Mick Jagger, Keith Richards, Jerry Garcia and Bob Weir, Elton John (with Bernie Taupin), Justin Hayward, John Lodge, Robbie Robertson, Ian Anderson, Phil Collins, Peter Gabriel, Peter Frampton, Don Henley, Glenn Frey, Country Joe McDonald, and Barry Melton. Many others like Eric Clapton found success as singer-songwriters in their later careers.

The scene that had developed out of the American folk music revival, pioneered by Woody Guthrie and Pete Seeger had grown to a major movement in the early 1960s, popularized by Joan Baez and her protégée, Bob Dylan, who had started reaching a mainstream audience with his hit, Blowin' in the Wind" (1963) bringing "protest songs" to a wider audience. There were hints of cross-pollination, but rock and folk music had remained largely separate genres, often with different audiences. An early attempt at fusing elements of folk and rock was highlighted in the Animals "House of the Rising Sun" (1964), a folk song, recorded with rock and roll instrumentation.

By the mid-1960s Bob Dylan took the lead in merging folk and rock, and in July 1965, released "Like a Rolling Stone", with a revolutionary rock sound, steeped in tawdry urban imagery, followed by an electric performance later that month at the Newport Folk Festival. Dylan plugged an entire generation into the milieu of the singer-songwriter. Often writing from an urban point of view, with poetry punctuated by rock rhythms and electric power, Dylan's fusing of folk and rock freed up emerging singer-songwriters to use elements of both traditions to tell their stories. In the mid- to late 1960s, bands and singer-songwriters began to proliferate the underground New York art/music scene. The release of The Velvet Underground & Nico in 1967, featuring singer-songwriter Lou Reed and German singer and collaborator Nico was described as the "most prophetic rock album ever made" by Rolling Stone in 2003.

In the late '60s a new wave of female singer-songwriters broke from the confines of pop, using the urban landscape as their canvas for lyrics in the confessional style of poets like Anne Sexton and Sylvia Plath. These pioneering women, appeared in a feature in Newsweek, July 1969, "The Girls: Letting Go: 'What is common to them – to Joni Mitchell and Lotti Golden, to Laura Nyro, Melanie, and to Elyse Weinberg, are the personalised songs they write, like voyages of self-discovery, brimming with keen observation and startling in the impact of their poetry." In The Guardian, author Laura Barton describes the radical shift in subject matter—they sang about politics, love affairs, the urban landscape, drugs, disappointment, and the life and loneliness of the itinerant performer. Lotti Golden, in her Atlantic debut album Motor-Cycle, chronicled her life in NYC's East Village in the late 1960s counterculture, visiting subjects such as gender identity (The Space Queens-Silky is Sad) and excessive drug use (Gonna Fay's). The women in the 1969 Newsweek article ushered in a new age of the contemporary female singer-songwriter that has informed generations of women singer-songwriters into the 21st century, with poet Warsan Shire as the muse for Beyoncé's 2016 album Lemonade.

By the mid-1970s and early 1980s, the original wave of singer-songwriters had largely been absorbed into a more general pop or soft rock format, but some new artists in the singer-songwriter tradition (including Billy Joel, Stevie Wonder, Gilbert O'Sullivan, Bruce Springsteen, Tom Petty, Jackson Browne, Chris Isaak, Victoria Williams, John Mellencamp, and Warren Zevon) continued to emerge, and in other cases rock and even punk rock artists such as Peter Case, Paul Collins, and Paul Westerberg transitioned to careers as solo singer-songwriters. Kate Bush remained distinctive throughout with her idiosyncratic style.

In the late 1980s, the term was applied to a group of predominantly female U.S. artists, beginning with Suzanne Vega whose first album sold unexpectedly well, followed by the likes of Tracy Chapman, Melissa Etheridge, Nanci Griffith, k.d. lang, Mariah Carey, Shania Twain, Sarah McLachlan, Shawn Colvin, Sheryl Crow, Lisa Loeb, Joan Osborne, Indigo Girls, and Tori Amos, who found success first in the United Kingdom, then in her home market. In the early 1990s, female artists also began to emerge in new styles, including Courtney Love and PJ Harvey. Later in the mid-1990s, the term was revived again with the success of Canada's Alanis Morissette and her breakthrough album Jagged Little Pill.

Also in the 1980s and 1990s, artists such as Bono, the Edge, Dave Matthews, Jeff Buckley, Richard Barone, Duncan Sheik, and Elliott Smith borrowed from the singer-songwriter tradition to create new acoustic-based rock styles. In the 2000s, a quieter style emerged, with largely impressionistic lyrics, from artists such as Norah Jones, Conor Oberst, Sufjan Stevens, David Bazan, South San Gabriel, Iron & Wine, David Gray, Ray LaMontagne, Meg Hutchinson, Darden Smith, Josh Rouse, Steve Millar, Jolie Holland, Patrick Duff, Richard Buckner, Jewel, Jack Savoretti, Richard Shindell, John Gorka, and Antje Duvekot. Some started to branch out in new genres such as Kurt Cobain, Noel Gallagher, T Bone Burnett, Eddie Vedder, and Pete Yorn. Others used drugs as a mind-altering way to boost creativity; for example, Emil Amos of Holy Sons took drugs daily from age sixteen on, wrote over 1,000 songs, and landed a record contract with an indie label.

Recording on the professional-grade systems became affordable for individuals in the late 1990s. This created opportunities for people to independently record and sell their music. Such artists are known as "indies" because they release their records on independent, often self-owned record labels, or no label at all. Additionally the Internet has provided a means for indies to get their music heard by a wider audience.

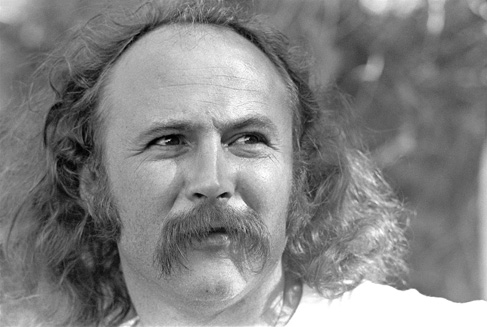
David Crosby, (of the Byrds and Crosby, Stills & Nash) is one of the singer-songwriters who crossed over into mainstream rock, seen here in 1976 backstage of the Frost Amphitheater, Stanford University.

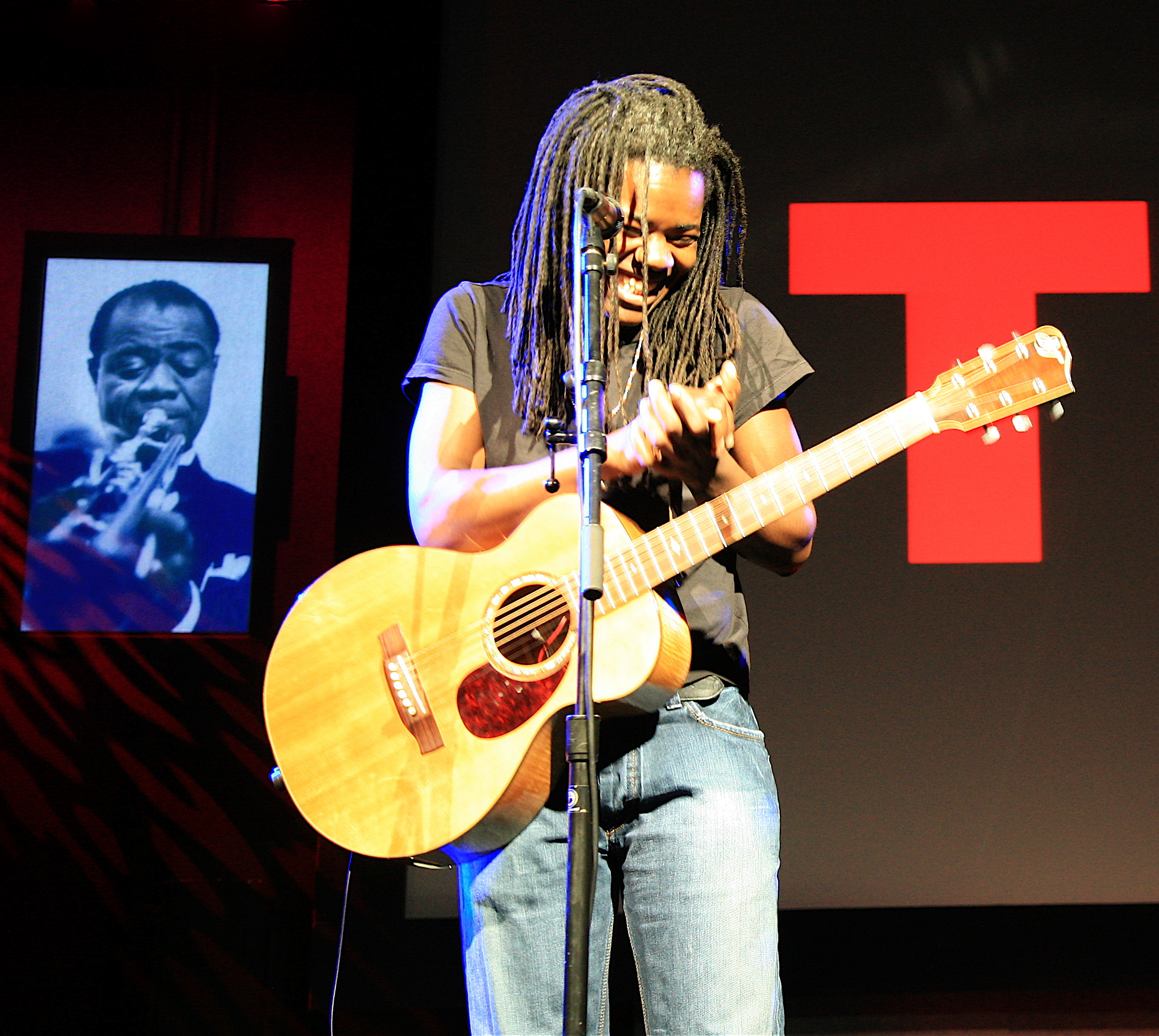
Tracy Chapman began singing about social issues in American society in the 1980s.

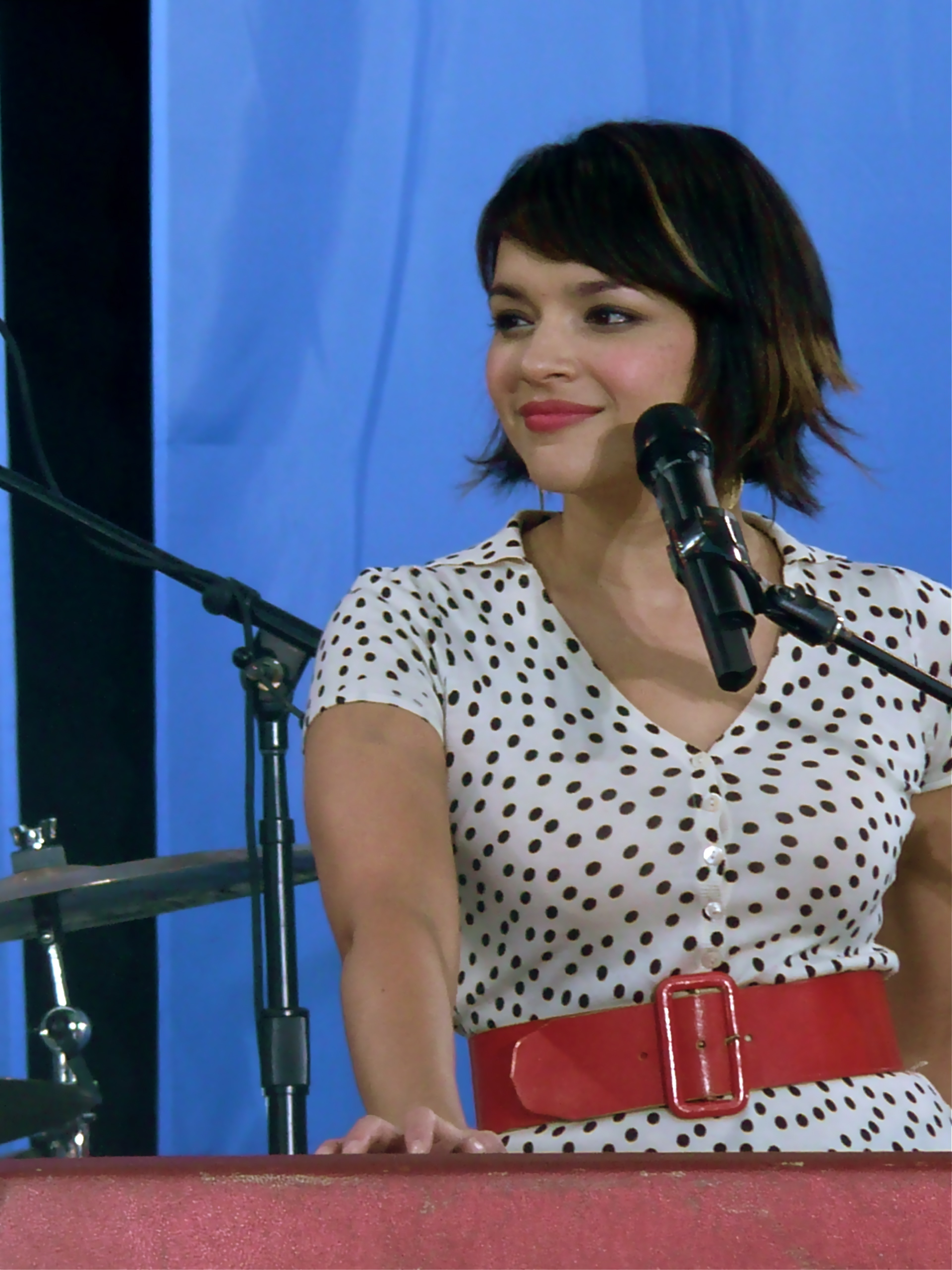
Norah Jones performing on an electric piano in 2010. Jones is the daughter of Ravi Shankar.

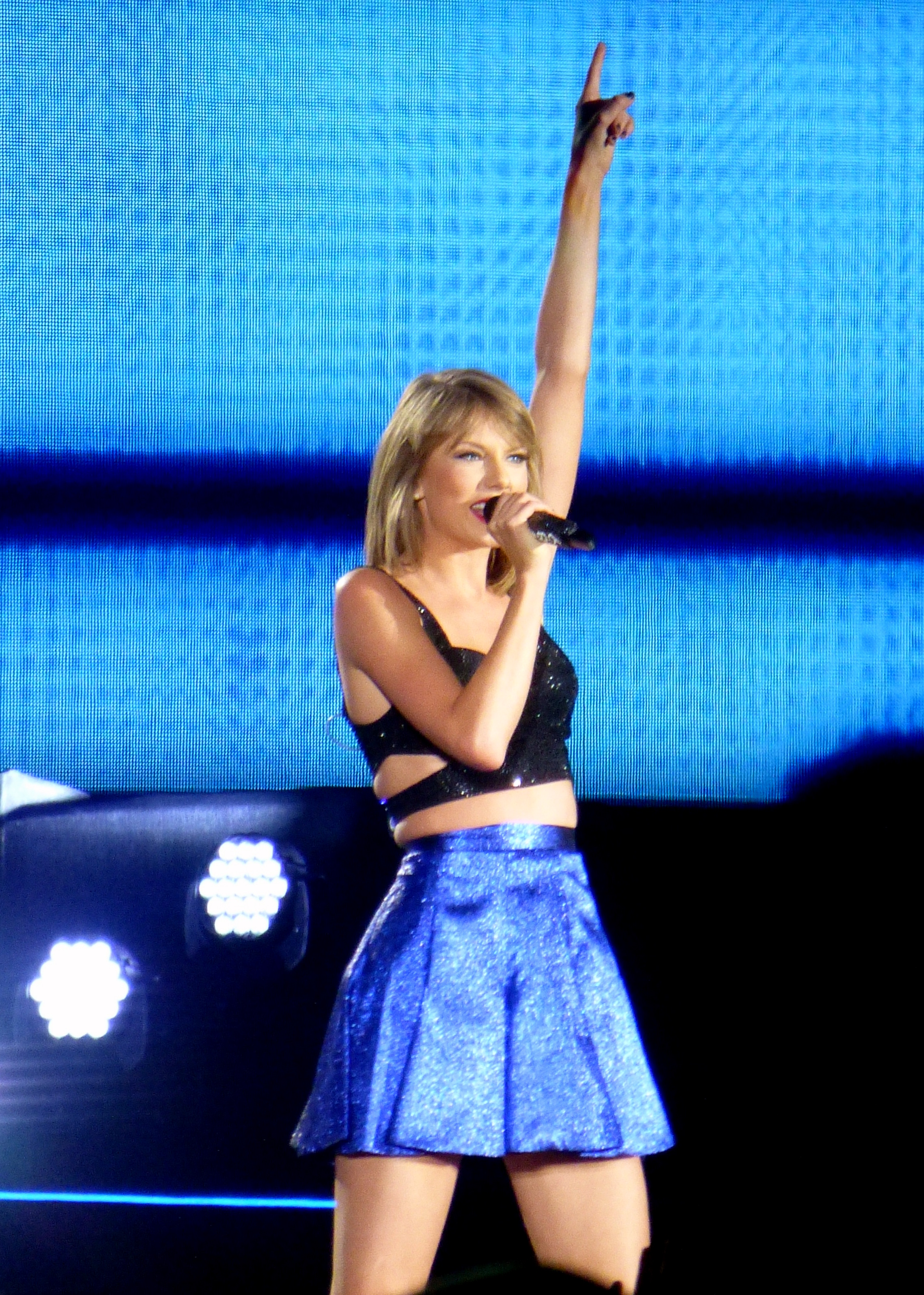
Taylor Swift is a contemporary singer-songwriter (pictured in 2015).

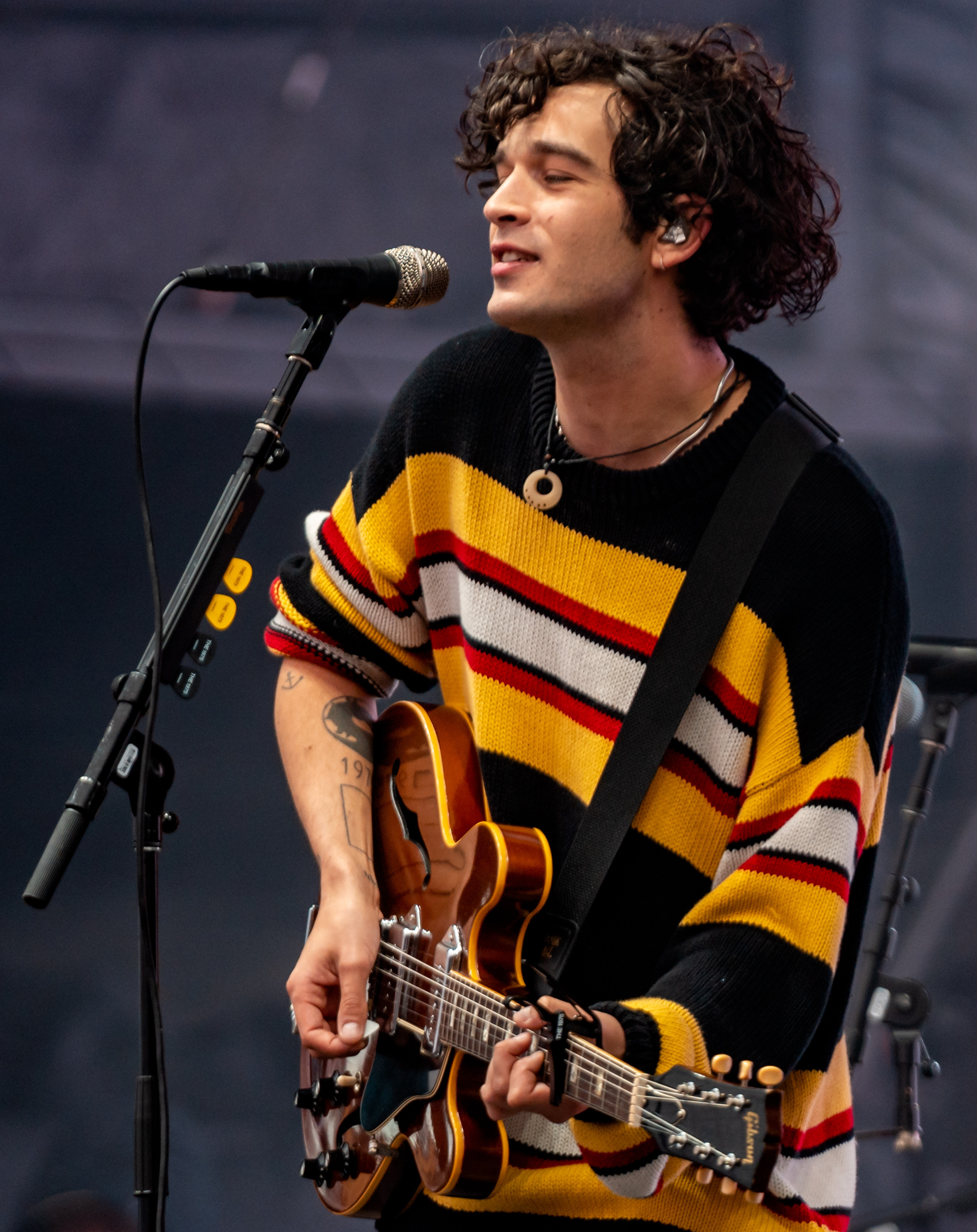
Matty Healy is a British singer-songwriter who fronts the indie art pop band the 1975 (pictured in 2019).

=== Chanson, the French tradition ===
French "chanson" comes from an old tradition, since the Middle Ages. It is driven by the rhythms of the French language. It can be distinguished from the rest of French "pop" music or soft rock format that began to spread in France during the 1960s until today, under the cultural influence of Anglo-American rock music and the rock band era.

The first modern French singer-songwriter was Charles Trenet, who began his solo career in 1938. He was the first to use jazz rhythms in chanson. He would remain an isolated act until the creative blooming of a new generation during the post-World War II era (mid-1940s and 1950s), where such artists as Léo Ferré, Georges Brassens, Félix Leclerc (from Quebec), Serge Gainsbourg, Jacques Brel (from Belgium), Henri Salvador (from French Guiana), Charles Aznavour, and Barbara appeared, with contrasted and rich imagination. Most of them are recognized as great masters by younger generations of French artists, especially Ferré (for the richness of his lyrics, his melodic genius, his critical density on social issues and his body of work's profoundness) and Gainsbourg (for the bright and tasteful adaptation of pop or rock music with French language-driven rhythms).

During the 1960s and 1970s, prominent singer-songwriters included Claude Nougaro, Jean Ferrat, Boby Lapointe, Françoise Hardy, Frédérik Mey, Michel Polnareff, Nino Ferrer, Christophe, Bernard Lavilliers, Véronique Sanson, and Jacques Higelin, amongst others.

=== Cantautore, the Italian tradition ===
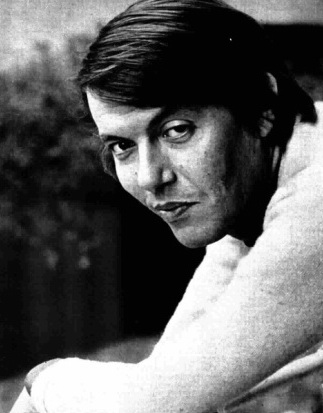
Fabrizio de André, 1971

Cantautore is the Italian expression corresponding to singer-songwriter in English. The word is a portmanteau of cantante ('singer') and autore ('author').

The first internationally renowned cantautore was Domenico Modugno with his song "Volare (Nel blu dipinto di blu)", a huge best seller in 1958; other early cantautori, who began their careers in the late 50s, are Enzo Jannacci, Gino Paoli, Giorgio Gaber, Luigi Tenco, and Umberto Bindi.

Claudio Baglioni emerged in the 1970s with a narrative and conceptual approach to songwriting, blending popular appeal with increasingly refined thematic structures.

Fabrizio De André, Lucio Battisti, and Francesco Guccini began their careers in the 1960s, while Edoardo Bennato, Lucio Dalla, Francesco De Gregori, Franco Battiato, Rino Gaetano, Ivan Graziani, Ivano Fossati, Antonello Venditti, Pino Daniele, Roberto Vecchioni, Paolo Conte, Angelo Branduardi, and Eugenio Finardi all appeared in the 1970s. Their songs are still popular today, often telling stories of marginalized (De André, Guccini, Dalla) and rebellious people (Finardi, De Gregori, Venditti), or having a political background (Venditti, Guccini).

Branduardi was greatly influenced by Medieval and Baroque musical styles, while his lyrics are usually inspired by ancient fables. Battiato started as a progressive rock and cultivated music artist in the 1970s, shifting to an original blend of pop, electronic, new wave, and world music in the 1980s.

Those cantautori linked to the city of Genoa (De André, Paoli, Bindi, Tenco, etc.) are also referred as members of the Genoese School.

The Neapolitan cantautore Pino Daniele often fused genres as diverse as R&B, fusion, blues, pop, jazz, and tarantella to produce a sound uniquely his own, with lyrics variously in Italian, Neapolitan or English. Similarly Paolo Conte was often tagged as a cantautore, but was more into the jazz tradition.

In the 1980s Vasco Rossi was renowned for his blend of blues-tinged rock music mixed with Italian melodies. He was nicknamed l'unica rockstar italiana ('the only Italian rockstar') by his fans.

Mixing international sounds and Italian lyrics, in the 2000s Bugo became the "fantautore", a neologism coined for him. He is considered the pioneer of the renewal of Italian songwriting, making a point break from tradition.

In the last 25 years the tradition has mainly been continued by Samuele Bersani, Caparezza, and the so-called "2nd Roman school of cantautori" (including Max Gazzè, Niccolò Fabi, Daniele Silvestri, and Simone Cristicchi).

The word has been borrowed into other languages, including Spanish, Portuguese, and Catalan cantautor, French chantauteur, Maltese kantawtur, Romanian cantautor, and Slovenian kantavtor.

=== Iberian-Latin American traditions ===
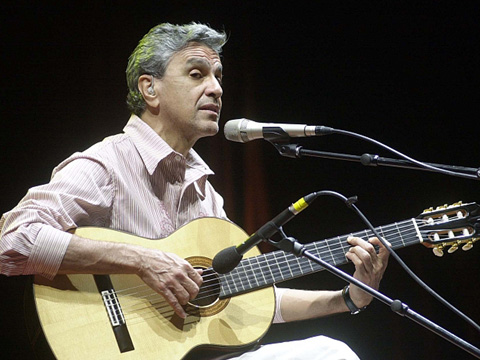
Caetano Veloso, 2006

Beginning in the 1960s and following the Italian cantautori style of the 1950s (like the one of Domenico Modugno), many Latin American countries developed singer-songwriter traditions that adopted elements from various popular styles. The first such tradition was the mid-1960s invention of nueva canción, which took hold in Andean countries like Chile, Peru, Argentina and Bolivia.

At around the same time, the Brazilian popular style bossa nova was evolving into a politically charged singer-songwriter tradition called Tropicalismo. Two performers, Gilberto Gil and Caetano Veloso became two of the most famous people in all of Brazil through their work in Tropicalismo.

After World War II it was developed in Italy a very prolific singer-songwriter (in Italian cantautore) tradition, initially connected with the French school of the chansonniers, and lately developed very heterogeneously. Although the term cantautore normally implies consistent sociopolitical content in lyrics, noteworthy performers in a more inclusive singer-songwriter categorization are: Domenico Modugno, Luigi Tenco, Gino Paoli, Sergio Endrigo, Fabrizio De André, Francesco De Gregori, Antonello Venditti, Roberto Vecchioni, Ivano Fossati, Lucio Dalla, Francesco Guccini, and Franco Battiato.

In neighbouring Malta, the main singer-songwriters are Walter Micallef, Manwel Mifsud and Vince Fabri. They all perform in Maltese.

Spain and Portugal have also had singer-songwriter traditions, which are sometimes said to have drawn on Latin elements. Catalonia is known for the Nova Cançó tradition – exemplified by Joan Manuel Serrat and Lluís Llach; the Portuguese folk/protest singer and songwriter José Afonso helped lead a revival of Portuguese folk culture, including a modernized, more socially aware form of fado called nova canção. Following Portugal's Carnation Revolution of 1974, nova canção became more politicized and was known as canto livre. Another important Spain singer-songwriters are Joaquín Sabina, José Luis Perales, and Luis Eduardo Aute.

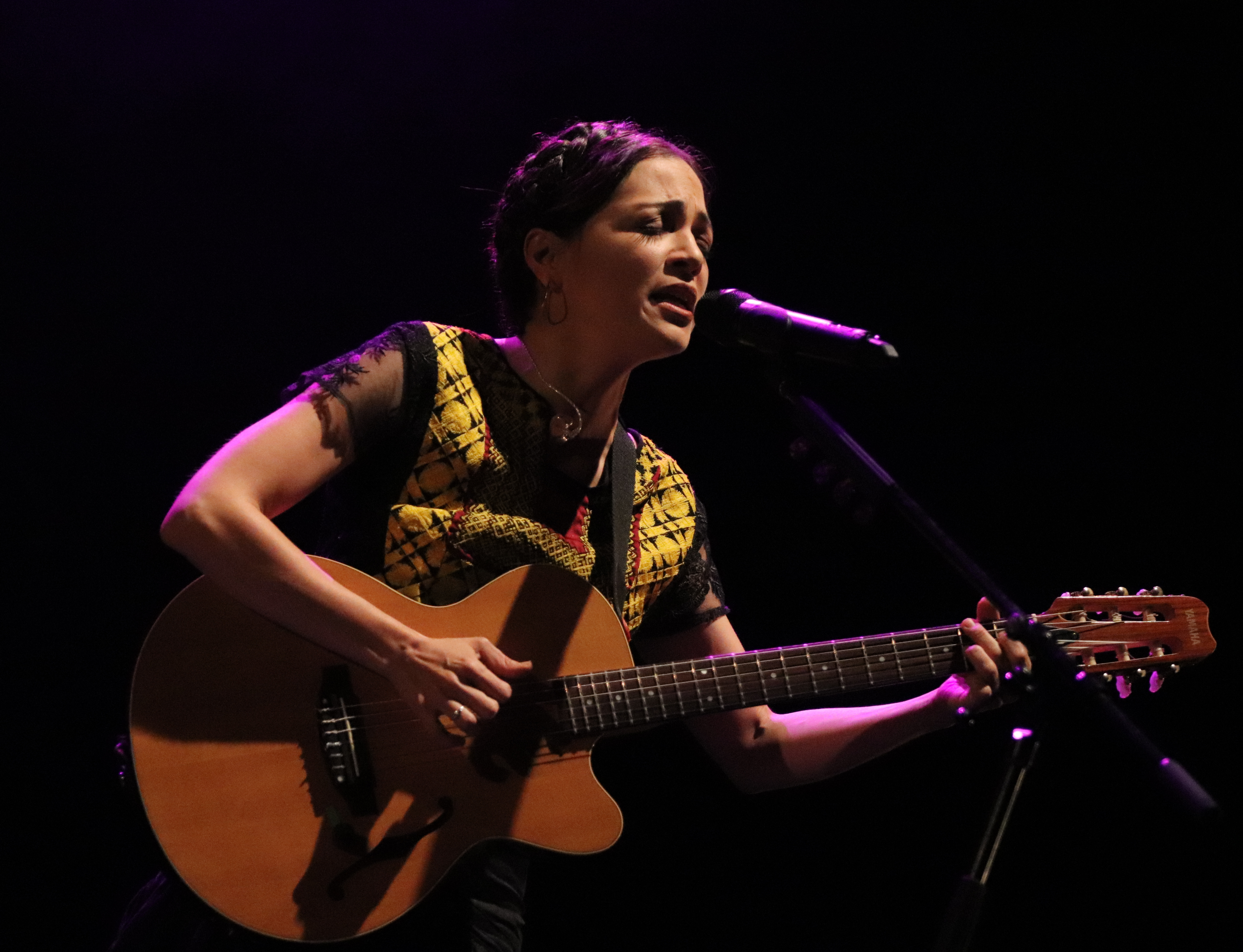
Natalia Lafourcade, 2018

In the latter part of the 1960s and into the 1970s, socially and politically aware singer-songwriters like Silvio Rodríguez and Pablo Milanés emerged in Cuba, birthing a genre known as nueva trova. Trova as a genre has had broad influence across Latin America. In Mexico, for example, canción yucateca on the Yucatán Peninsula and trova serrana in the Sierra Juárez, Oaxaca, are both regional adaptations of trova. Today, Guatemalan Ricardo Arjona qualifies as Latin America's most commercially successful singer-songwriter. Although sociopolitical engagement is uneven in his oeuvre, some see Arjona's more engaged works as placing him in the tradition of the Italian cantautori.

In the mid-1970s, a singer-songwriter tradition called canto popular emerged in Uruguay.

With the influence of Tropicalismo, Traditional Samba and Bossa Nova, MPB (Música popular brasileira), or Brazilian Popular Music, became highly singer-songwriter based. For years solo artists would dominate Brazilian popular music with romantic cynicism alla Jobim or subliminal anti-government messages alla Chico Buarque. After the end of the military dictatorship in Brazil, Brazilian music became less politically and socially conscious. The censored Raul Seixas or the humorous spiritualist Jorge Ben were slowly obscured by funk carioca, axé music, and Brazilian disco. In recent years, however, a new stock of socially conscious Brazilian singer-songwriters is beginning to break the almost strictly dance-music momentum that has reigned since the 1980s (see the 'Brazilian folk/folk-rock sub-article in Brazilian Music).

=== Soviet Union and Russia ===
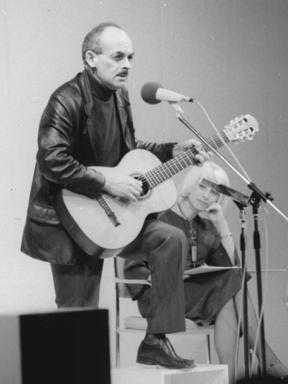
Soviet and Russian bard Bulat Okudzhava, 1976

Since the 1960s, those singers who wrote songs outside the Soviet establishment have been known as "bards". The first songs traditionally referred to as bard songs are thought to be written in the late 1930s and early 1940s, and the very existence of the genre is traditionally originated from the amateur activities of the Soviet intelligentsia, namely mass backpacking movement and the students' song movement of the 1950s and 1960s. Many bards performed their songs in small groups of people using a Russian guitar, rarely if ever would they be accompanied by other musicians or singers. Though, bards using piano or accordion are also known. Those who became popular held modest concerts. The first nationwide-famous bards (starting their career in the 1950s) are traditionally referred to as the First Five: Mikhail Ancharov, Alexander Gorodnitsky, Novella Matveyeva, Bulat Okudzhava, and Yuri Vizbor. In the 1960s, they were joined by Vladimir Vysotsky, Victor Berkovsky, Yuliy Kim, and many others.

In the course of the 1970s, the shift to the classical 6-string guitar took place, and now, a Russian guitar is a rare bird with the bards. In the same period, the movement of KSP (Kluby Samodeyatelnoy Pesni – amateur song fan clubs) emerged, providing the bards with highly educated audience, and up to the end of the 1980s being their key promotion engine. Bards were rarely permitted to record their music, partly given the political nature of many songs, partly due to their vague status in the strictly organised state-supported show business establishment of the USSR. As a result, bard tunes usually made their way around as folk lore, from mouth to mouth, or via the copying of amateur recordings (sometimes referred as magnitizdat) made at concerts, particularly those songs that were of political nature. Bard poetry differs from other poetry mainly in the fact that it is sung along with a simple guitar melody as opposed to being spoken. Another difference is that this form of poetry focuses less on style and more on meaning. This means that fewer stylistic devices are used, and the poetry often takes the form of narrative. What separates bard poetry from other songs is the fact that the music is far less important than the lyrics; chord progressions are often very simple and tend to repeat from one bard song to another. On the other hand, in the USSR the chief bard supporter was the state Union of Composers, and the main bard hater was the state Union of Writers. A far more obvious difference was the commerce-free nature of the genre: songs were written to be sung and not to be sold. The similar genre dominated by singers-songwriters is known as sung poetry in other Post-Soviet countries.

=== Bulgaria ===
Singer-songwriters are popular in Bulgaria under the name "bards", or "poets with guitars". Their tradition is a mixture of traditional folk motifs, city folklore from the early 20th century, and modern influences. In the 1960s, 1970s, and 1980s, the Communist regime in the country started to tolerate the Bulgarian "bards", promoting the so-called "political songs", performed usually by one-man bands. A national festival tradition was established, under the title "Alen Mak" (Red Poppy), a symbol with strong Communist meaning in Bulgaria. At the same time, there were some prominent underground figures which were against the official Communist Party line, such as Angel "Jendema" Angelov, Yavor "Yavkata" Rilov, and Velizar "Valdes" Vankov.

After the collapse of Communism in 1989, the singer-songwriters' tradition was re-established. Currently, the Bulgarian "bards" enjoy several festivals (local and international) per year, namely the PoKi Festival (Poets with Guitars, Poetic Strings) in the town of Harmanli, the Bardfest in Lovech, the Sofia Evenings of Singer-Songwriters, and others. Major figures in the Bulgarian tradition are Dimitar Taralezhkov, Angel "Jendema" Angelov, Yavor "Yavkata" Rilov, Velizar "Valdes" Vankov, Dimitar Dobrev, Andro Stubel, Branimir "Bunny" Stoykov, Dorothea Tabakova, Mihail Belchev, Assen Maslarski, Grisha Trifonov, Plamen Stavrev, Vladimir Levkov, Margarita Drumeva, Maria Batchvarova, Plamen Sivov, and Krasimir Parvanov.

=== Romania ===
Despite the communist isolation, the tradition of the singer-songwriter in Romania flourished beginning with the end of the 1960s and it was put in the context of folk music, with its three main styles in Romania: ethno folk, American-style folk and lyrical (cult) folk. The framework for many of these initiatives came under the form of Cenaclul Flacăra, a series of mass cultural events with an inevitable ideological touch. Still, with the merit of supporting great opening initiatives: the appropriation of Western artists like Bob Dylan, Joan Baez and others from the Woodstock generation, the public performance of gospel-like music, the opening to big international issues (pop culture, accountability of the leadership, tension surging during the Cold War-with surprisingly neutral positions, etc.). Overall, the Romanian folk, in general, could be marked as an underground cultural movement, somewhere between non-aligned and protest music.

=== Liedermacher, the German tradition ===
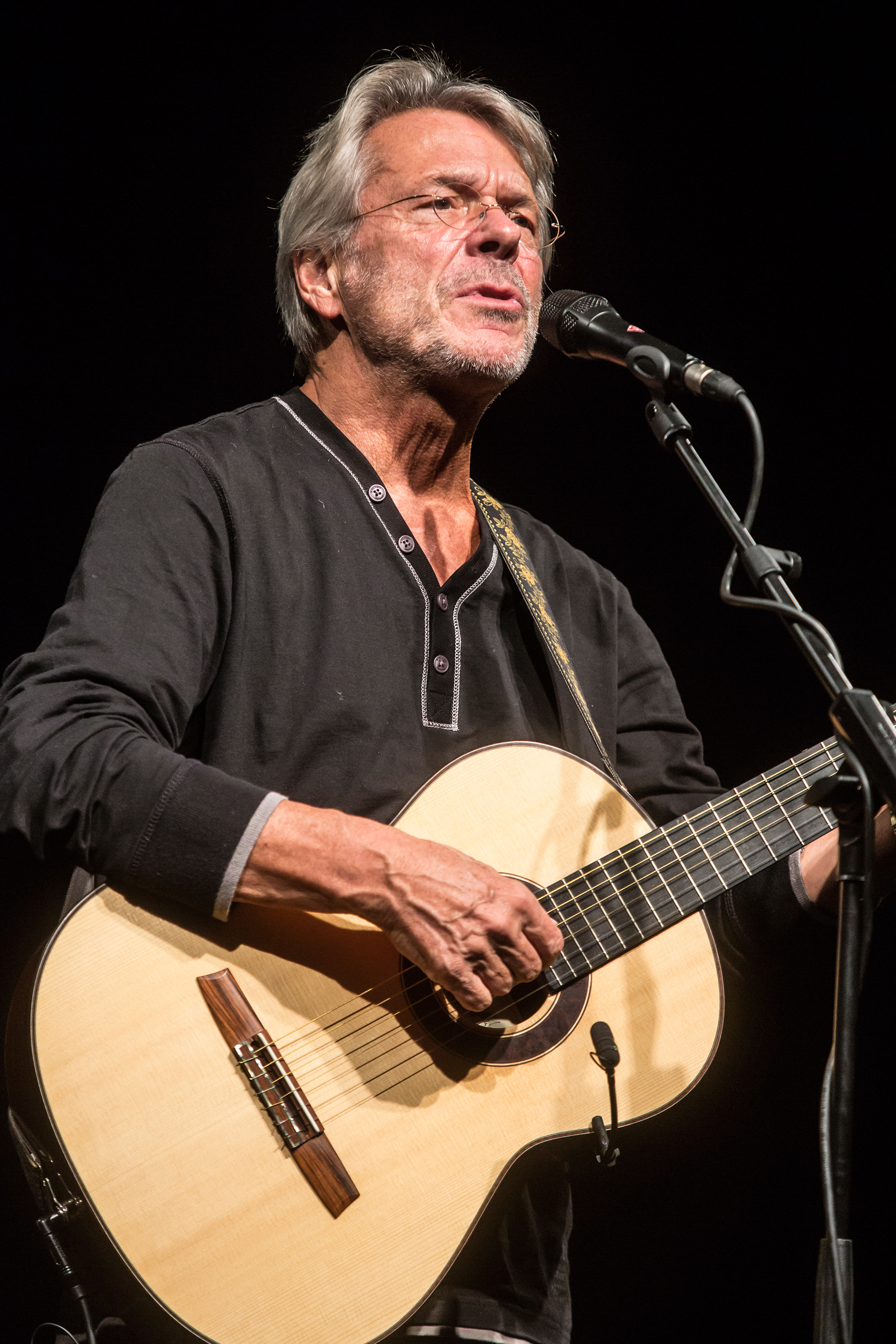
Reinhard Mey, 2014

Rooted in the European Bänkelsang ("bench-singing") and Moritat traditions while also taking immediate inspiration from the French chanson scene and the American folk music revival, the 1960s and 1970s saw the emergence of a whole generation of German-language singer-songwriters called Liedermacher ("songmakers"), among them Hannes Wader, Franz Josef Degenhardt, Reinhard Mey, and Konstantin Wecker from West Germany, Wolf Biermann from East Germany as well as Ludwig Hirsch and Georg Danzer from Austria. With regards to content and style, the Liedermacher spectrum ranges from political balladeering to rather observational storytelling and love songs. The lyrics often deal with topics such as social injustice, militarism, consumerism, environmental issues or the repercussions of the German Nazi past, often expressing technoskepticism and anti-establishment views.

=== Sweden ===
In the mid-1960s, Sweden witnessed the renaissance of the "trubadur", the Swedish version of the singer-songwriter. Cornelis Vreeswijk and Fred Åkerström were particularly influential in their efforts to blend the heritage of the "visa" (a specific way to render simple stanzaic poems or songs, given distinction by artists such as Carl Michael Bellman and Evert Taube) with modern approaches to balladeering.

=== Netherlands ===
Ede Staal (Warffum) (1941–1986) was a Dutch singer-songwriter from the Northern province of Groningen who sang mainly in the Groninger dialect of Dutch.

== See also ==
- List of Rock and Roll Hall of Fame inductees
- List of singer-songwriters
- Protest songs in the United States
- American folk music revival
- Swedish ballad tradition
- Griot, West African songwriting tradition
