= Vuelta (album) =

Studio album by Richard Shindell
- Released: August 24, 2004
- Genre: Folk; Singer-songwriter
- Label: Koch
- Producer: Richard Shindell; Puente Celeste

Richard Shindell chronology
Courier (2002)	Vuelta (2004)	South of Delia (2007)

Professional ratings
Review scores
Source	Rating
Allmusic	4/5 stars
George Grahm	(favorable)
Fretplay	5/5 stars
FolkWax	(9/10)
PopMatters	(favorable)
WKAR	(favorable)

Vuelta is the sixth album by singer-songwriter Richard Shindell, recorded largely in collaboration with Puente Celeste, in Buenos Aires, Argentina.

== Track listing ==
All songs written by Richard Shindell except where indicated.

1. "Fenario" (final verse taken from "Daybreak" by John Donne) – 5:18
2. "Waist Deep in the Big Muddy" (Pete Seeger) – 4:29
3. "The Island" – 4:07
4. "Hazel's House" – 3:20
5. "Che Guevara T-Shirt" – 5:27
6. "Canción Sencilla" – 4:16
7. "There Goes Mavis" – 5:54
8. "So Says the Whippoorwill" – 4:37
9. "The Last Fare of the Day" – 4:52
10. "Gray Green" – 3:52

== Personnel ==
- Pablo Acedo – Engineer
- Alejandro Franov – Piano, Accordion, Sitar, Fender Rhodes, Group Member
- Mark Frethem – Mastering
- David Glasser – Mastering
- Tracy Grammer – Violin
- Lucy Kaplansky – Harmony
- Mariano Lopez – Engineer, Mixing
- Radoslav Lorković – Chimes
- Ricardo Maril – Assistant
- Dennis McDermott – Percussion, Drums
- John Putnam Pedal Steel, engineer
- Lincoln Schleifer – Bass (Electric), Harmonium, engineer, Mixing
- Richard Shindell – Guitar (Acoustic), Guitar (Electric), Vocals, producer
- Mark Spector – Management
- David Wilkes – Product Manager

== Tour ==
Shindell promoted Veulta with a 2004 national US tour.

- 9/23 San Diego, CA at Acoustic Music
- 9/24 Santa Barbara, CA at SOHO
- 9/25 Santa Monica, CA at McCabes
- 9/26–27 Berkeley, CA at Freight & Salvage
- 9/29 Winters, CA at The Palms
- 10/22 Montclair, NJ at Outpost in the Burbs
- 10/23 Somerville, MA at Somerville Theater
- 10/24 Waitsfield, VT at Valley Players Theater
- 10/27–28 Northfield, MA at Iron Horse
- 10/29 Londonderry, NH at Tupelo Music Hall
- 10/30 Huntington, NY at IMAC
- 11/1 Charlottesville, VA at Gravity Lounge
- 11/3 Charlotte, NC at Evening Muse
- 11/4 Asheville, NC at Grey Eagle
- 11/5 Atlanta, GA at Red Light Café
- 11/10 Cincinnati, OH at Emerald Ballroom
- 11/11 Ann Arbor, MI at The Arc
- 11/12 Chicago, IL at Old Town School
- 11/17 Cleveland, OH at Beachland Ballroom
- 11/19–20 New York, NY at Joe's Pub
- 11/ 21 Philadelphia, PA at World Café Live
