= Blue Divide =

Studio album by Richard Shindell
- Released: September 25, 1994
- Studio: Shelter Island (New York City)
- Genre: folk, singer-songwriter
- Label: Shanachie
- Producer: Steve Addabbo

Richard Shindell chronology
Sparrows Point (1992)	Blue Divide (1994)	Reunion Hill (1997)

Professional ratings
Review scores
Source	Rating
Allmusic	3/5 stars

Blue Divide is the second album by singer-songwriter Richard Shindell. It was released in 1995 by Shanachie Records. Shanachie also released a live promo CD, Scenes from a Blue Divide (Live) and More which included five live tracks recorded at the Treestar Coffeehouse in Mount Kisco, New York.

Joan Baez covered the song "Fishing" on the album Gone from Danger.

== Track listing ==
All songs by Richard Shindell except where noted

1. "A Summer Wind, A Cotton Dress"
2. "Fishing"
3. "The Ballad of Mary Magdalene"
4. "Lazy"
5. "The Things That I Have Seen"
6. "TV Light" (Addabbo, Shindell)
7. "A Tune for Nowhere"
8. "Arrowhead"
9. "Ascent"
10. "Blue Divide"

== Personnel ==
Musicians:

- Richard Shindell – vocals, acoustic guitar, high-strung guitar, harmony, cittern
- Steve Addabbo – Hammond organ, electric guitar
- Kenneth Blevins – drums
- Larry Campbell – lap steel, pedal steel, mandolin
- Séamus Egan – mandolin, uilleann pipes
- Peter Freeman – synthesizer
- Mark Hamza – Hammond organ
- Lucy Kaplansky – harmony
- Juan Patiño – percussion
- Dave Richards – bass
- Michael Visceglia – bass
- John Whelan – button accordion

Production

- Produced by Steve Addabbo
- Recorded and mixed at Shelter Island Sound, New York City
