= Reunion Hill =

Studio album by Richard Shindell
- Released: August 19, 1997
- Studio: Sorcerer Sound, New York City
- Genre: Folk, singer-songwriter
- Length: 46:52
- Label: Shanachie
- Producer: Larry Campbell

Richard Shindell chronology
Blue Divide (1995)	Reunion Hill (1997)	Somewhere Near Paterson (2000)

Professional ratings
Review scores
Source	Rating
Allmusic	3/5 stars
Fretplay	4/5 stars
No Depression	favorable

Reunion Hill is a 1997 album by singer-songwriter Richard Shindell. It was Shindell's third and final studio album for Shanachie Records. Allmusic calls the album "songcraft at its finest." The album includes a cover of "I'll Be Here in the Morning" by Townes Van Zandt who died earlier that same year.

Shindell composed the title song in 1996 for Joan Baez, who later included it on her Gone From Danger album. It was also covered by Fairport Convention on their 2011 CD Festival Bell and Show of Hands on their 2012 album Wake the Union. The song is written from the perspective of a Civil War widow. Baez also covered "Money for Floods" on Gone From Danger.

"The Next Best Western" describes a long drive along Interstate 80 including Ohio and references Christian radio. The song has been covered by Phil Beer of Show of Hands, Lucy Wainwright Roche and others.

== Track listing ==
All songs by Richard Shindell except where noted

1. "The Next Best Western" – 4:35
2. "Smiling" (Larry Campbell, Shindell) – 4:43
3. "May" – 4:37
4. "I Saw My Youth Today" – 3:18
5. "Reunion Hill" – 4:28
6. "Beyond the Iron Gate" – 5:24
7. "Darkness, Darkness" (Jesse Colin Young) – 3:56
8. "Money for Floods" – 3:46
9. "Easy Street" – 3:58
10. "The Weather" – 3:49
11. "I'll Be Here in the Morning" (Townes Van Zandt) – 4:18

== Personnel ==
Musicians:

- Richard Shindell – vocals, acoustic guitar, harmony, percussion
- Larry Campbell – acoustic, electric and baritone guitars, bouzouki, mandolin, pedal steel, lap steel, fiddle, percussion
- Lucy Kaplansky – harmony
- Frank Vilardi – drums, percussion
- Radoslav Lorković – piano, Hammond B3, harmonium, accordion
- Dave Richards – electric and upright bass
- Robby Walsh – Bodhran
- Teresa Williams – harmony

Production

- Produced by Larry Campbell
- Recorded by Tim Conklin at Sorcerer Sound New York City
- and by Al Hemberger, Matt Baxter and Roy Matthews at The Loft Bronxville, New York
- Mixed at The Loft by Larry Campbell, Al Hemberger, and Richard Shindell
