= Anne Heaton (folk singer) =

American musician

Anne Heaton is an American pop-influenced folk singer-songwriter and pianist from New York City. She majored in liberal studies at the Notre Dame, and grew up in the Chicago suburb of Wilmette. She regularly toured with "Live from New York" on the eastern coast of the United States. In 2007, Heaton moved to Boston, and generally tours and performs with multi-instrumentalist Frank Marotta.

== Early life and education ==
Anne Heaton grew up in Wilmette, IL, a suburb of Chicago and started playing piano at the age of 3. She was trained in classical music and turned down a scholarship to study at Boston's Berklee School of Music in classical piano. In an interview with The New York Times Online, Heaton said she gave up classical piano because she found it too inhibiting and exact. Thinking she would one day be a philosophy professor, Heaton pursued philosophy and theology at the University of Notre Dame in Indiana.

Heaton sang in a cover band in college and later found her calling in music and songwriting. After college, Heaton made her way to NYC. There she played in a Latin band and sang in a gospel choir in Harlem.

== Music ==
Heaton's debut release in 2002, Black Notebook, was met with critical acclaim and garnered "Top DIY Pick" from Performing Songwriter magazine.

In 2004, she released Give In, which she created in collaboration with Mike Denneen.

Her second release, Give In, in 2005 was called "tender, amusing, barbed and spiritual by turns" by The Washington Post.

Heaton toured across the US in support of her albums. In 2004, Heaton won the Soul City Café competition and earned the opening slot for Jewel during her West Coast tour. Heaton has also played with or opened for Melissa Ferrick, HEM, Jill Sobule, The Pernice Brothers, Catie Curtis, Jennifer Kimball, Jonatha Brooke, and Edie Carey.

Blazing Red, released March 3, 2009, is Heaton's latest offering. She teamed up with Gary Maurer (of HEM) to produce Blazing Red and gathered funds to record the album by taking preorders from fans. The New York Times Online praised, "Jump", the opening track of Blazing Red, calling it "absolutely gorgeous.”

== Influences ==
She cites Peter Gabriel, Tori Amos and The Indigo Girls as her biggest influences.

== Discography ==
=== Solo albums ===
- Black Notebook (2002)
- Give In (2004)
- I Know This (EP) (2005)
- Blazing Red (2009)
- Honeycomb (2012)
- Dora (2014)
- To the Light (2019)

=== Collaborative albums ===
- Winterbloom: Winter Traditions (2009)

(with Antje Duvekot, Meg Hutchinson, and Natalia Zukerman)
