= Somewhere Near Paterson =

Studio album by Richard Shindell
- Released: February 8, 2000
- Studio: The Loft Recording Studios, Bronxville, New York
- Genre: Folk, singer-songwriter
- Length: 49:22
- Label: Signature Sounds
- Producer: Larry Campbell

Richard Shindell chronology
Reunion Hill (1997)	Somewhere Near Paterson (2000)	Courier (2002)

Professional ratings
Review scores
Source	Rating
AllMusic	2.5/5 stars
Fretplay	4.5/5 stars

Somewhere Near Paterson is a 2000 album by singer-songwriter Richard Shindell. It was Shindell's first album for Signature Sounds. It was also Shindell's first album following the album and tour performed with the collaboration, Cry Cry Cry. His bandmates Lucy Kaplansky and Dar Williams join with him here on Buddy and Julie Miller's "My Love Will Follow You".

== Track listing ==
All songs by Richard Shindell except where noted

1. "Confession" – 5:18
2. "Abuelita" – 3:55
3. "You Stay Here" – 3:59
4. "My Love Will Follow You" (Buddy Miller, Julie Miller) – 4:13
5. "Spring" – 5:07
6. "Wisteria" – 4:50
7. "Waiting for the Storm" – 3:33
8. "The Grocer's Broom" – 4:04
9. "Merritt Parkway, 2am" – 3:28
10. "Transit" – 5:56
11. "Calling the Moon" (Dar Williams) – 4:59

== Personnel ==
Musicians:

- Richard Shindell – vocals, acoustic guitar
- Larry Campbell – cittern, appalachian dulcimer, dobro, pedal steel, acoustic, electric and baritone guitar, mandolin, violin
- Siobhan Egan – bodhran
- Lucy Kaplansky – harmony vocals
- Denny McDermott – drums, percussion
- Joanie Madden – tin whistle
- Billy Masters – electric guitar
- Roy Matthews – engineer
- Lincoln Schleiffer – bass
- Rick Slater – engineer
- Kenny White – piano
- Dar Williams – harmony vocals

Production

- Produced by Larry Campbell
- Mixed by Ben Wisch
- Recorded at The Loft Recording Studios, Bronxville, NY.
- Mastered by David Glasser at Airshow.
- Photography by C. Taylor Crothers.
- Design by Hunter Studio
