= Not Far Now =

Studio album by Richard Shindell
- Released: April 7, 2009
- Genre: Folk
- Label: Signature Sounds
- Producer: Greg Anderson & Richard Shindell

Richard Shindell chronology
| South of Delia (2007) | Not Far Now (2009) | Careless (2016) |

Professional ratings
Review scores
| Source | Rating |
|---|---|
| AllMusic | 3.5/5 stars |
| Compulsive Reader | (favorable) |
| CountryChart | (favorable) |
| FolkWax | (8/10) |
| PopMatters | (7/10) |
| Songs:Illinois | (favorable) |
| Valley Advocate | (favorable) |
| LyricQuill | 5/5 stars |

Not Far Now is Richard Shindell's eighth studio album and sixth album of original material.

== Track listing ==
All tracks written by Richard Shindell except where noted.

1. "Parasol Ants" – 3:46
2. "A Juggler Out In Traffic" – 4:35
3. "Gethsemani Goodbye" – 4:14
4. "¿Que Hago Ahora?" (Silvio Rodríguez) – 2:25
5. "Bye Bye" – 4:02
6. "Mariana's Table" – 4:36
7. "State Of The Union" – 5:17
8. "One Man's Arkansas" – 4:26
9. "Get Up Clara" – 3:05
10. "The Mountain" (Dave Carter) – 3:55
11. "Balloon Man" – 4:11

== Personnel ==
- Alejandro Baccarat – photography
- Mark Dann – engineer, mastering, mixing
- Meghan Dewar – design, layout design
- Seth Glier – Hammond organ
- Lisa Gutkin – baritone violin
- Steve Holley – drums, tambourine, claves, cajon, shaker, cowbell
- Lucy Kaplansky – harmony vocals
- Viktor Krauss – engineer, acoustic bass
- Rich Lamb – engineer
- Dennis McDermott – percussion, drums
- Sara Milonovich – violin, viola, engineer, harmony vocals, string arrangements, baritone violin
- Brian Mitchell – Hammond organ, Wurlitzer
- John Putnam – pedal steel, electric guitar, tiple
- Lincoln Schleifer – electric bass, engineer
- Richard Shindell – acoustic guitar, bouzouki, percussion, piano, electric bass, electric guitar, vocals, engineer, harmony vocals, cajon, piano strings, 12 string electric guitar
- Ben Wittman – percussion, cymbals, drums, tom-tom, shaker

== Mariana's EP ==
Mariana's EP: Alt Versions and No Shows from Not Far Now is a limited edition release with alternate versions and outtakes from Not Far Now. It was first made available to participants in Shindell's fan-based financing program for Not Far Now. It has since been available as a download only from his web site.

=== Track listing ===
1. "Get Up Clara" (Alt mix) – 3:05
2. "Balloon Man" (Alt version) – 4:28
3. "Mariana's Table" (Alt version) – 5:06
4. "State of the Union" (Demo version) – 5:24
5. "I Am" (Unreleased) – 3:52
6. "Hideous Grin" (Previously unreleased) – 4:31
