= Courier (album) =

Live album by Richard Shindell
- Released: February 12, 2002
- Recorded: February 2 and March 16–17, 2001
- Genre: Folk
- Label: Signature Sounds

Richard Shindell chronology
Somewhere Near Paterson (2000)	Courier (2002)	Vuelta (2004)

Professional ratings
Review scores
Source	Rating
Allmusic	4.5/5 stars
FAME	(favorable)
Fretplay	4.5/5 stars
FolkWax	(8/10)
Kevin McCarthy	(favorable)
Lou's Reviews	(favorable)
Music Matters	(favorable)

Courier is the first live recording and sixth album by Richard Shindell. It includes many of his most popular originals from previous recordings, a cover of Lowell George's classic song, "Willin'", and what has been described as a "near-holy reading" of Bruce Springsteen's "Fourth of July, Asbury Park".

Signature Sounds also offered a limited number of bonus EP's titled The Sonora Sessions, which included an additional seven tracks.

== Courier ==
=== Track listing ===
All songs written by Richard Shindell, except where noted.

1. "The Courier" 4:51
2. "Memory of You" – 4:28
3. "The Next Best Western" – 4:17
4. "Willin'" (Lowell George) – 3:15
5. "The Kenworth of My Dreams" – 4:05
6. "Nora" – 4:42
7. "Arrowhead" – 5:07
8. "Reunion Hill" – 4:24
9. "Fishing" – 4:33
10. "A Summer Wind, A Cotton Dress" – 4:04
11. "On a Sea of Fleur de Lis" – 4:47
12. "The Ballad of Mary Magdalen" – 5:11
13. "Are You Happy Now?" – 4:10
14. "Transit" – 7:32
15. "Fourth of July, Asbury Park" (Bruce Springsteen) – 6:35

Recorded by Ben Wisch and Ron Schreier at the Emelin Theatre (Mamaroneck, NY) 3/16 and 17, 2001. Tracks 3 and 11 recorded at the Outpost in the Burbs (Montclair, NJ) on 2/2/01. Track 7 recorded at Bailey Building & Loan (Greenwich Village, NYC). Mixed by Ben Wisch.

== Personnel ==
Musicians:

- Richard Shindell – guitar and vocals
- Lucy Kaplansky – harmony vocals
- Dennis McDermott – drums
- John Putnam – electric guitar, tiple
- Lincoln Schleifer – bass

and on tracks 3 and 11:

- Greg Anderson – bouzouki, guitar, cittern
- Lisa Gutkin – violin
- Radoslav Lorković – accordion

on "Reunion Hill"

- Larry Campbell – violin

Other credits:

- David Glasser – Mastering
- Toby Goldberg – Project Coordinator
- Ron Schreier – Engineer, Live Recording Coordination
- Ben Wisch – Engineer, Mixing
- Carol Young – Project Coordinator

== The Sonora Sessions ==
=== Track listing ===
1. "Confession" – 5:00
2. "Abeulita" – 4:08
3. "You Stay Here" – 5:00
4. "Wisteria" – 5:23
5. "Johnny Star Intro" – 0:42
6. "Sonora's Death Row" (Kevin Blackie Farrell) – 4:19
7. "Sonora's Death Row II" – 3:15
