= Natalia Zukerman =

American musician

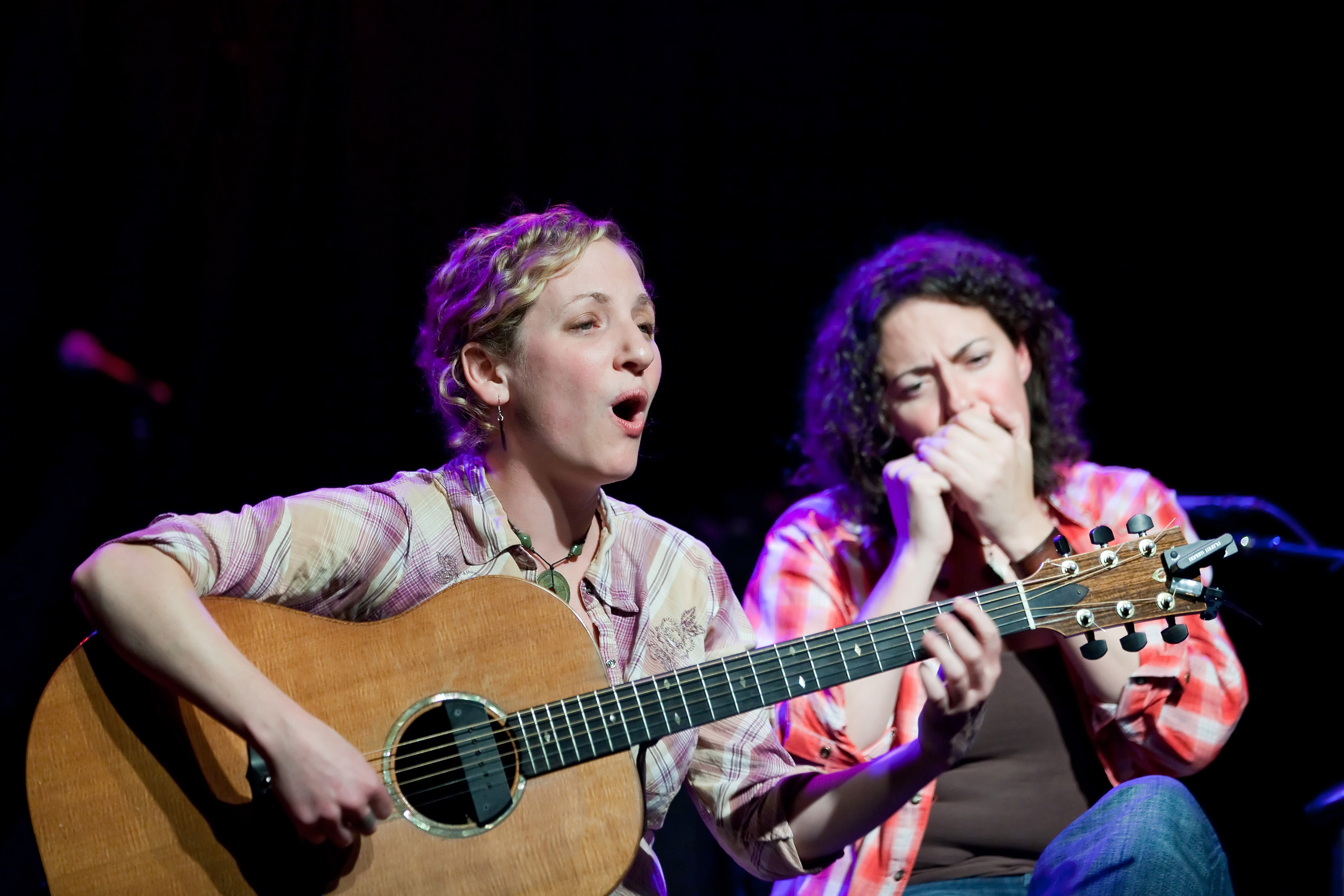
- Natalia Zukerman and Trina Hamlin live in May 2010 at Madison, Wisconsin

Background information
- Born: June 25, 1975 (age 50); New York City, United States
- Genres: Americana, blues, folk
- Occupations: Singer-songwriter, musician
- Instruments: Guitar, vocals, acoustic guitar, slide guitar, lap steel guitar, dobro
- Years active: 2000–present
- Labels: Talisman Records (2001–present); Weasel Records (2008–present)
- Website: www.nataliazukerman.com

Natalia Zukerman (born June 25, 1975) is an American artist and musician. She blends genres of blues, jazz, bluegrass and folk.

== Personal life ==
Zukerman was born in Manhattan, the daughter of violinist/violist/conductor Pinchas Zukerman and flutist/writer Eugenia Zukerman, and the sister of opera singer Arianna Zukerman.

In 1997 she earned a Bachelor of Arts in Visual Art at Oberlin College. Her senior thesis culminated in an exhibit of large-scale mixed media paintings.

She is openly lesbian.

== Music and career ==
Zukerman's subject matter ranges from the whimsical to the metaphysical. Often she tells stories or relates personal observations about life and relationships, but her songs are not "confessional" in nature. Her vocal style reflects strong jazz influences.

Zukerman plays a variety of guitars including acoustic, electric, slide guitar, dobro, lap steel guitar and banjo, but primarily focuses on her Goodall acoustic guitar and vintage 1938 Rickenbacker lap steel guitar. Her guitar playing has been described as "fluid and smooth" while she has also been praised for her dexterity and nimble fingers.

Her first three albums were released on her own independent record label, Talisman Records. In 2008, she released her fourth album on Willy Porter's Weasel Records label.

Her 2011 studio album was Gas Station Roses. The album featured many guest appearances, including Patty Larkin, Garrison Starr, Meghan Toohey (The Weepies), Adrianne Gonzalez (The Rescues), Todd Sickafoose (Ani Difranco), and Ray Bonneville.

== Discography ==
=== Albums ===
- 2001 – Mortal Child
- 2003 – On A Clear Day
- 2006 – Only One
- 2008 – Brand New Frame
- 2011 – Gas Station Roses
- 2014 – Come Thief, Come Fire

=== Collaborations ===
- Winterbloom: Winter Traditions (2009), with Antje Duvekot, Meg Hutchinson, and Anne Heaton.
