= South of Delia =

Studio album by Richard Shindell
- Released: May 10, 2007
- Recorded: 2006
- Genre: folk
- Length: 52:41
- Label: Richard Shindell Recordings
- Producers: Richard Shindell and Greg Anderson

Richard Shindell chronology
| Vuelta (2004) | South of Delia (2007) | Not Far Now (2009) |

Professional ratings
Review scores
| Source | Rating |
|---|---|
| Allmusic | 3.5/5 stars |
| FolkWax | (8/10) |
| Freight Train Boogie | 4.5/5 stars |
| Fretplay | 5/5 stars |
| Sing Out! | (favorable) |
| USA Today | 4/4 stars |
| LyricQuill | 4.5/5 stars |

South of Delia is the seventh solo album by American folk singer-songwriter Richard Shindell. South of Delia is a cover album. Although he himself is sometimes described as a "songwriter's songwriter," covers are not new to Shindell. In addition to recording a few on his previous solo albums, he was also one third of the folk supergroup / cover band Cry Cry Cry (along with Dar Williams and Lucy Kaplansky). On South of Delia, Shindell covers songs from several songwriting legends, including Woody Guthrie and Bob Dylan, as well as some from younger up-and-coming writer/performers, such as Jeffrey Foucault and Josh Ritter.

Although the official release date was May 10, 2007, pre-orders began shipping in late March. The album began to appear on a number of radio airplay charts prior to its official release (see below).

The title "South of Delia" comes from a line in the Josh Ritter song, "Lawrence, KS". The song was previously recorded by Ritter for his 2001 album, Golden Age of Radio.

== Track listing ==
1. "Acadian Driftwood" (Robbie Robertson) – 5:33
  - Richard Shindell – vocal, bouzouki, acoustic guitar
  - Larry Campbell – pedal steel
  - Lucy Kaplansky – harmony
  - Radoslav Lorković – accordion
  - Dennis McDermott – drums
  - Sara Milonovich – violin, harmony
  - Lincoln Schleifer – electric bass
  - Ben Wittman – triangle
2. "Señor (Tales of Yankee Power)" (Bob Dylan) – 4:53
  - Richard Shindell – vocal, bouzouki, electric slide guitar
  - Greg Anderson – piano
  - Viktor Krauss – upright bass, bass harmonics
  - Dennis McDermott – snare drum, cymbal
  - David Sancious – hammond b3
3. "The Humpback Whale" (Harry Robertson) – 4:56
  - Richard Shindell – vocal, nylon string guitar, cajón peruano, cymbal
  - Richard Thompson – electric guitar
  - Viktor Krauss – upright bass
4. "Born in the U.S.A." (Bruce Springsteen) – 3:06
  - Richard Shindell – vocal, bouzouki, keyboard, harmony
  - Greg Anderson – mandolin
  - Larry Campbell – electric guitar
  - Mark Dann – electric bass
  - Radoslav Lorković – harmonium
  - Dennis McDermott – drums
  - Ben Wittman – tambourine, cymbal
5. "Mercy Street" (Peter Gabriel) – 4:18
  - Richard Shindell – vocal, bouzouki, piano, electric guitar, cajón peruano
  - Greg Anderson – electric bass
  - Lucy Kaplansky – harmony
  - Sara Milonovich – low whistle, harmony
6. "The Storms Are on the Ocean" (A.P. Carter) – 3:19
  - Richard Shindell – vocal, acoustic guitar, bouzouki
  - Sara Milonovich – violin, harmony
  - Viktor Krauss – upright bass
  - Ben Wittman – snare drum
7. "Northbound 35" (Jeffrey Foucault) – 5:18
  - Richard Shindell – vocal, acoustic guitar, electric guitar, cajón peruano
  - Greg Anderson – electric bass
  - Lucy Kaplansky – harmony
  - Sara Milonovich – violin
  - David Sancious – piano
8. "Sitting on Top of the World" (trad arr Shindell) – 3:05
  - Richard Shindell – vocal, electric guitar, foot
9. "Texas Rangers" (trad arr Shindell) – 4:09
  - Richard Shindell – vocal, bouzouki, electric guitar
  - Viktor Krauss – upright bass
  - Dennis McDermott – tom-toms, drum heads, bodhrán, cymbals
  - Richard Thompson – lead guitar
  - Tony Trischka – banjo
  - Ben Wittman – snare drum, garbage can
10. "Deportee (Plane Wreck at Los Gatos)" (words: Woody Guthrie, music: Martin Hoffman) – 5:06
  - Richard Shindell – vocal, acoustic guitar, electric guitar
  - Eliza Gilkyson – harmony
  - Mark Hallman – harmony
  - Radoslav Lorković – hammond b3
  - Dennis McDermott – drums
  - Lincoln Schleifer – electric bass
11. "Solo le Pido a Dios" (Leon Gieco) – 4:41
  - Richard Shindell – vocal, harmony vocals, acoustic guitar, electric guitar, mountain dulcimer, tambourine, bombo leguero
  - Pablo Aslan – upright bass
  - Leon Gieco – harmony
  - Lisa Gutkin – violin
  - Analia Sirio – harmony
12. "Lawrence, KS" (Josh Ritter) – 4:10
  - Richard Shindell – vocal, bouzouki, electric guitar, tambourine, cymbal
  - Greg Anderson – electric bass
  - Larry Campbell – pedal steel
  - Lucy Kaplansky – harmony
  - Dennis McDermott – drums
  - Sara Milonovich – violin, harmony

== Charts ==
| Chart | Peak | Date |
|---|---|---|
| Folk DJ-L –; Folk Radio Airplay Chart | 3 | May 2007 |
| Roots Music Report – Folk Chart | 6 | May 24, 2007 |
| Americana Music Association – Americana Top 40 | 31 | May 28, 2007 |
| Americana Roots – Top 25 Spins for the last 7 days on Roots Radio | Top 25 | May 8, 2007 |
