= Sparrows Point (album) =

Studio album by Richard Shindell
- Released: 1992
- Genre: Folk
- Label: Shanachie
- Producer: David Seitz, Richard Shindell

Richard Shindell chronology
| Sparrows Point (1992) | Blue Divide (1995) |

Professional ratings
Review scores
| Source | Rating |
|---|---|
| AllMusic | 4.5/5 stars |
| Fast Folk Musical Magazine | favorable |

Sparrows Point is the debut album by the American musician Richard Shindell, released in 1992.

== Track listing ==
1. "Are You Happy Now?" – 3:49
2. "Castaway" – 3:55
3. "By Now" – 5:16
4. "The Courier" – 4:18
5. "Sparrows Point" – 4:47
6. "The Kenworth of My Dreams" – 3:44
7. "On a Sea of Fleur-de-Lis" – 4:22
8. "Memory of You" – 3:38
9. "You Again" – 2:59
10. "Nora" – 3:59
11. "Howling at the Trouble" – 3:42

== Personnel ==
Musicians:

- Richard Shindell – vocals, acoustic and electric guitar
- Steve Addabbo – electric guitar, harmony
- Greg Anderson – bass, cittern, electric guitar
- Chris Bishop – bass
- Kenneth Blevins – drums
- Larry Campbell – pedal steel, banjo, violin
- Diane Chodkowski – harmony
- Mark Dann – bass
- John Gorka – harmony
- Mark Hamza – hammond organ
- Jack Hardy – harmony
- Margo Hennebach – hammond organ
- Winifred Horan – violin
- Lucy Kaplansky – harmony
- Joanie Madden – Irish whistle
- Mark McColl – percussion
- Marshall Rosenberg – percussion
- Ilene Weiss – harmony
- Howie Wyeth – drums

Production

- Produced by David Seitz and Richard Shindell
  - tracks 2, 5 & 10 by Steve Addabbo, Richard Shindell & David Seitz
  - at Synergy Sound, Great Neck, New York
  - and at Shelter Island Sound, New York City
- Mixed by David Seitz, Richard Meyer, Judy Aweiman and Greg Anderson
  - at Synergy sound
- Mastered by Robert Vosgien, CMS Digital
