= Richard Shindell =

Singer-songwriter

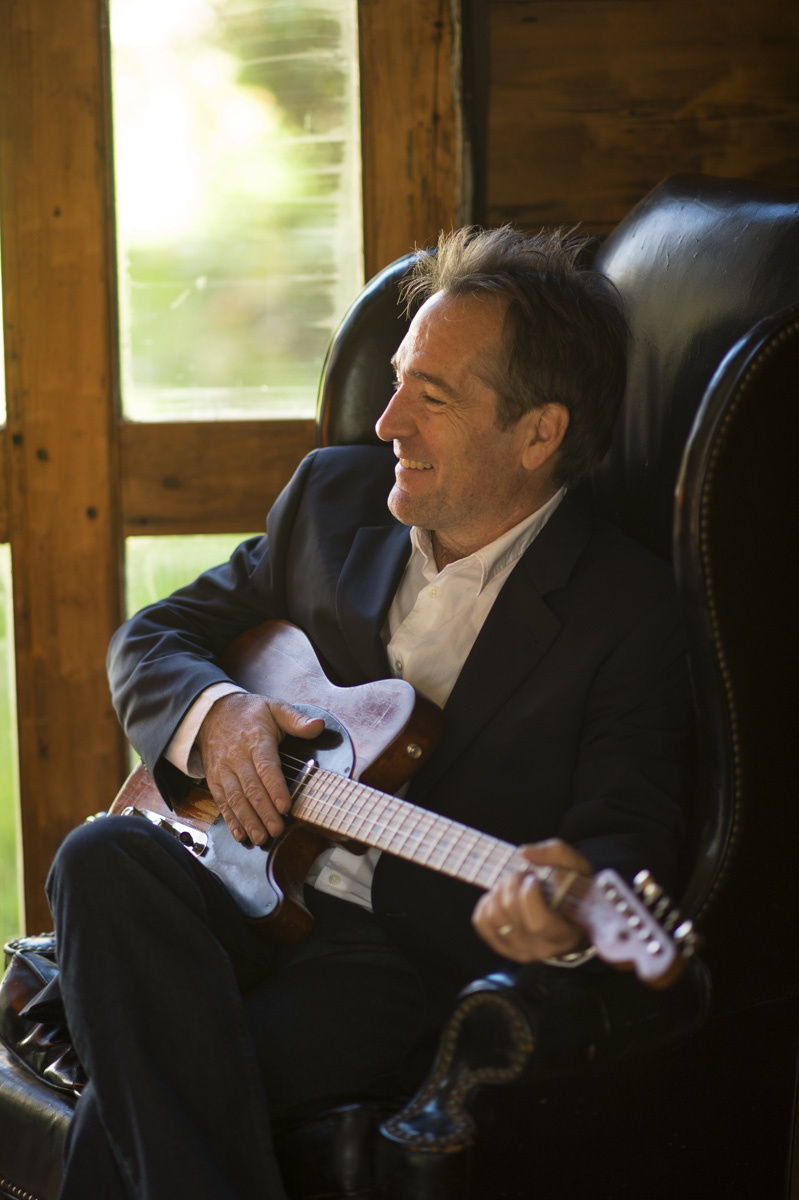
- Richard Shindell, November 2014.

Background information
- Born: Richard Shindell; August 3, 1960 (age 66); Lakehurst, New Jersey, United States
- Genres: Folk, singer-songwriter
- Instruments: Vocals, guitar
- Years active: 1991–present
- Labels: Shanachie, Signature Sounds, Koch

Richard Shindell (born August 3, 1960) is an American folk singer, songwriter, producer, and musician. Shindell grew up in Port Washington, New York, and now lives in Buenos Aires, Argentina, with his wife, Lila Caimari, a university professor, and their children.

Shindell's career received a boost in 1997 when Joan Baez recorded three of his songs ("Fishing", "Reunion Hill", and "Money for Floods") for her album Gone from Danger and invited the aspiring singer-songwriter to join her 1997–98 tour.

Shindell collaborated with Dar Williams and Lucy Kaplansky to form the group Cry Cry Cry. On their eponymous 1998 album, Cry Cry Cry covered an eclectic mix of songwriters. The trio toured in support of their album before resuming solo careers. In 2017-2018 the group reunited briefly. The resulting tour culminated in a live recording of their final show on April 15, 2018, at The Freight and Salvage in Berkeley, CA, all proceeds of which went to support Live Music Society.

A recording of cover songs, South of Delia, was released on Shindell's website in March 2007. An album of original material, Not Far Now, appeared in 2009. 13 Songs You May Or May Not Have Heard Before, a compilation of reworked previous releases and some new material, followed in 2011. Careless, his most recent recording, was released in September 2016.

Shindell and Lucy Kaplansky reunited to collaborate on a new album of cover songs, Tomorrow You're Going, funded through Kickstarter, and released in March 2015 under the name Pine Hill Project.

In October 2019, Shindell announced that he would cease touring in order to pursue other projects. In the same announcement, Shindell named The Point Stalk Inn in Maine and the River Club Music Hall in Massachusetts as his favorite venues he has played.

Shindell's songs and songwriting style often involves storytelling from a first-person point of view: an INS officer and irregular immigrant in "Fishing", a World War II soldier in "Sparrows Point", a Confederate drummer boy in "Arrowhead", an Argentine grandmother in "Abuelita", and a power broker in "Confession". His other personae include a New York City cab driver in "The Last Fare of the Day", a man on death row in "Ascent", a war widow in "Reunion Hill", and Mary Magdalene.

== Discography ==
=== Albums ===
- Sparrows Point (Shanachie, March 13, 1992)
- Blue Divide (Shanachie, September 26, 1994)
- Reunion Hill (Shanachie, August 19, 1997)
- Cry Cry Cry (Razor & Tie, October 1, 1998), with Dar Williams and Lucy Kaplansky
- Somewhere Near Paterson (Signature Sounds, February 8, 2000)
- Courier (Signature Sounds, February 12, 2002) [Live album]
- Vuelta (Koch Records, August 24, 2004)
- South of Delia (Richard Shindell Music, May 10, 2007)
- Live at the Chandler Music Hall, Randolph, VT (2007) [Described as Archive Series No. 1, limited edition recording of a concert from November 11, 2006]
- Not Far Now (Signature Sounds, 2009)
- 13 Songs You May Or May Not Have Heard Before (Amalgamated Balladry, 2011) [Compilation]
- Tomorrow You're Going (2015), with Lucy Kaplansky (The Pine Hill Project)
- Careless (Amalgamated Balladry, September 9, 2016)

=== EPs ===
- Scenes from a Blue Divide (Shanachie, 1995)
- Spring (Signature Sounds 1256-2, 2000). Contains "Spring" (single edit), "Confession" (acoustic version), "Shades of Black, Shades of Blue" (Charles Lyonhart), and "Spring/Summer Reel" (album version)
- 3x2 Sampler (Signature Sounds, 2000). Contains "Beyond the Iron Gate" (alternate version), "Abuelita", and "Transit" (album versions). Also contains three songs by Peter Mulvey.
- The Sonora Sessions (Signature Sounds, 2001)
- Mariana's EP (Amalgamated Balladry, 2009)

=== Various artists compilations ===
- The Folk Next Door: A Collection of Connecticut Roots Music (WWUH 1992). Contains live version of "Home Team".
- The Postcrypt: Commemorating 30 Years of Postcrypt Coffehouse 1964-1994 (1-800-PRIME-CD, 1995). Contains live version of "Fishing".
- Main Stage Live: Falcon Ridge Folk Festival (Signature Sounds 1253, 1999). Contains live version of "Paddy's Green Shamrock Shore" (traditional arranged by R. Shindell).
- Wonderland: A Winter Solstice Celebration (Signature Sounds 1266, 2002). Contains "Before You Go".

=== Production ===
- The Near Demise of the Highwire Dancer (Antje Duvekot, 2009).
- The New Siberia (Antje Duvekot, 2012).

== Bibliography ==
- Michael Erlewine & Scott Bultman (ed.) (1992) All Music Guide, 1st ed., p. 525, ISBN 0-87930-264-X (the source of his birthplace).
- Michael Erlewine & Chris Woodstra (ed.) (1994) All Music Guide, 2nd ed., p. 524-5, ISBN 0-87930-331-X .
- Michael Erlewine, Vladimir Bogdanov, Chris Woodstra & Stephen Thomas Erlewine (ed.) (1997) All Music Guide, 3rd ed., p. 776, ISBN 0-87930-423-5 .
- Vladimir Bogdanov, Chris Woodstra & Stephen Thomas Erlewine (ed.) (2001) All Music Guide, 4th ed., p. 805, ISBN 0-87930-627-0 .
- Neal Walters & Brian Mansfield (ed.) (1998) MusicHound Folk: The Essential Album Guide, p. 525, ISBN 1-57859-037-X (the source of his birth date).
- Colin Larkin (ed.) (1998) The Encyclopedia of Popular Music, 3rd ed., Vol. 6, p. 4881, ISBN 1-56159-237-4 .
- Martin C. Strong (2011) The Great Folk Discography, Vol. 2: The Next Generation, p. 313-4, ISBN 1-84697-177-2 .
