= Puente Celeste =

Argentine music group

Puente Celeste is an Argentine music group, founded in 1997. They won a Clarín Award for the best musical album in 1997, as well as a Konex Award (Diploma of Merit, in the nomination of jazz music) in 2005.

They perform a broad range of music which is influenced by jazz, tango, as well as Latin American folk music and even Klezmer.

== Band members ==
- Edgardo Cardozo (guitar, vocals)
- Luciano Dyzenchauz (double bass)
- Marcelo Moguilevsky (wind instruments, vocals)
- Lucas Nikotián (accordion, piano)
- Santiago Vazquez (percussion, vocals)

== Discography ==
- Santiago Vazquez & Puente Celeste (1997), Clarín Award for the best musical album and Revelation of the year
- Pasando el mar (2002)
- Mañana domingo (2004)
- Canciones (2009)
- Puente Celeste en vivo en Café Vinilo (2011)
