= Meg Hutchinson =

American folk singer-songwriter (born 1978)

- Born: South Egremont, Massachusetts
- Origin: United States
- Genres: folk
- Occupations: Musician, singer-songwriter
- Instrument: guitar
- Label: Red House Records
- Website: meghutchinson.com

Meg Hutchinson (born 1978, in South Egremont, Massachusetts) is an American folk singer-songwriter. Originally from rural westernmost Massachusetts, Hutchinson is now based in the Boston area. She has won songwriting awards in the US, Ireland and UK, including recognition from John Lennon Songwriting Contest, Billboard Song Contest and prestigious competitions at Merlefest, NewSong, Kerrville, Falcon Ridge, Telluride Bluegrass and Rocky Mountain Folks festivals.

She has been described as delivering "music as powerful as it is gentle".

== Biography ==
Meg Hutchinson was raised by English teachers in a small town outside of Great Barrington, Massachusetts called South Egremont. After graduating from Bard College at Simon's Rock, with a BA in Liberal Arts with concentration in creative writing, Hutchinson quit her job on an organic lettuce farm and settled in Boston, Massachusetts. In between gigs at pubs, coffeehouses and subway train stations, she won a Kerrville New Folk Award (2000) and was nominated for a Boston Music Award for her first studio album Against the Grey. She went on to win awards at the Rocky Mountain Folks Fest, the Telluride Troubadour Songwriter's Showcase in Colorado and The Chris Austin Songwriting Contest at Merlefest in North Carolina, all in the course of a year, causing national publications like Performing Songwriter to take notice, calling her "A master of introspective ballads filled with understated yearning and an exquisite sense of metaphor."

After recording her live CD Any Given Day in 2001, she went into the studio with producer Crit Harmon (Lori McKenna, Martin Sexton, Mary Gauthier) to record The Crossing.

== 2008 Album Come Up Full ==
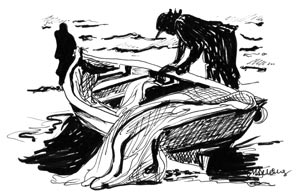
Come Up Full was inspired by Maine lobster fishermen and was Hutchinson's first collaboration with Connecticut sketch artist and painter Mary Devaney.

Come Up Full was Hutchinson's first release on Folk label Red House Records. A record about encountering good things when you least expect them, Hutchinson's introduction to the folk community was well-received within the genre.

== 2010 Album The Living Side ==
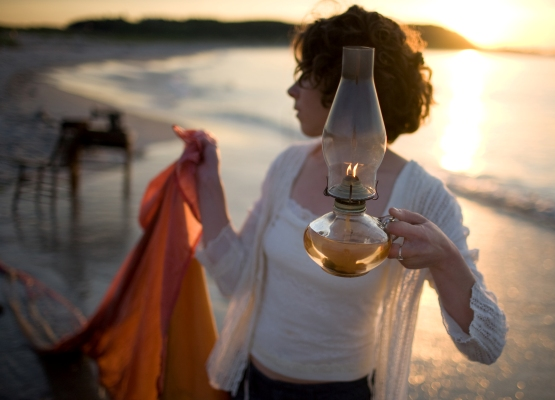
"The Living Side" was Meg Hutchinson's first collaboration with Polish modern art photographer Asia Kepka.

Upon the release of The Living Side, Hutchinson's second album on Red House Records, songwriter John Gorka said, "After you hear Meg, you feel you've been somewhere."

"I grew up in the country without a TV or internet," Hutchinson says. "There were so many quiet hours in the day. So many spaces between events. We have forgotten how to be alone in our thoughts. All the best work comes out of that rich stillness of waiting."

== Discography ==
=== Solo albums ===
Year	Album	Radio Charts		Sales Charts		Song notes
Year	Album	Folk	Roots	Billboard		Song notes
2010	The Living Side	27, 23	15	32	"Hard To Change" reached No. 2 on Folk radio; "Seeing Stars" reached #109 in iTunes-US Singer/Songwriter	
2008	Come Up Full	10,	11	-	"Home" reached No. 6 on Folk radio	
2004	The Crossing	74	-	-	While this album did not appear on most charts, it was the first serviced to radio stations in New England primarily, received heavy airplay from WERS Boston.	
2001	Any Given Day (Live) (remastered in 2009)	-	-	-	While this album did not chart, "True North" was the song that introduced Hutchinson's music to the Folk community at festival competitions.	
1999	Against The Grey	-	-	-		
1996	Meg Hutchinson	-	-	-		

=== Singles ===
- "True North" (2007, studio version)

=== Collaborative albums ===
- Winterbloom: Traditions Rearranged (2009)

(with Antje Duvekot, Anne Heaton, and Natalia Zukerman)
