= Antje Duvekot =

American singer-songwriter (born 1974)

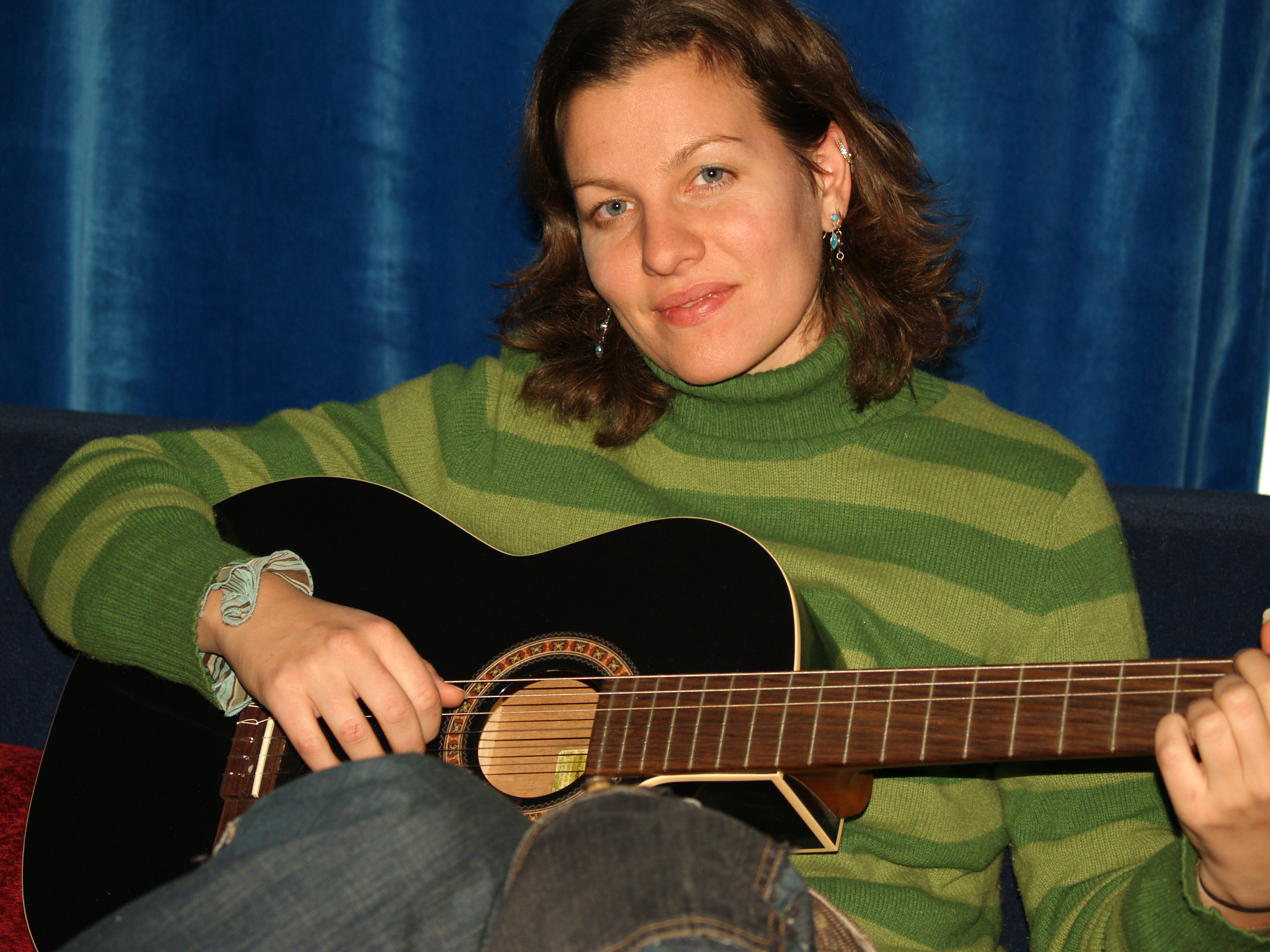

Background information
- Born: Antje Duvekot; November 15, 1974 (age 51); Heidelberg, West Germany
- Origin: Philadelphia, Pennsylvania, United States
- Genres: Folk pop
- Occupations: Singer-songwriter guitarist
- Instruments: Acoustic guitar, vocals, piano, ukulele, harmonica, irish bouzouki
- Years active: 2000–present
- Website: Official website Official MySpace page

Antje Duvekot (/ˈɑːntjə ˈduːvəkɒt/ AHNT-yə DOO-və-kot; born 1974) is a German-American singer-songwriter and guitarist based in Somerville, Massachusetts. She holds three top songwriting awards including the Kerrville New Folk Competition's Best New Folk Award, Boston Music Award for Outstanding Folk Act, and Grand Prize in the John Lennon Songwriting Contest.

== Biography ==
Born in Heidelberg, West Germany, Duvekot moved to Delaware, US, at the age of 13. Duvekot writes songs that are often profound and personal, and she frequently records and performs with little accompaniment besides her acoustic guitar.

She began recording music on her own at the age of cassette tapes for her friends. At 18 she won the first open mic competition she entered, at the Sam Adams Brewpub in Philadelphia. Within a year, she had recorded a number of songs on a borrowed 4-track tape machine, and released a self-produced full-length cassette entitled Waterstains, which she sold at gigs in and around Newark, Delaware, where she had attended the University of Delaware.

In 2000, her song "Soma" won the grand prize in the rock category of the John Lennon Songwriting Contest.

Duvekot often tours with Ellis Paul, who sings on her first studio album, Big Dream Boulevard. Big Dream Boulevard was produced by Séamus Egan of the Irish-American band Solas. Solas has previously recorded five of Duvekot's songs: "Black Annis," "The Poisonjester's Mask," "Erin," "Reasonland," and "Merry Go Round."

Duvekot's first two albums, Little Peppermints and Boys, Flowers, Miles, are based on recordings of live performances, although some tracks include studio overdubs as well. Both albums include spoken anecdotes from Duvekot.

In 2007, Duvekot's song "Merry-Go-Round" was used in a marketing campaign for Bank of America, including a spot during Super Bowl XLI. Duvekot performed for the first time as a professional in Europe, in August 2007, as part of Denmark's Tønder Festival, accompanied by Karan Casey, John Doyle, Liz Carroll, Julie Fowlis, and Mick McAuley.

Duvekot released her second studio CD, The Near Demise of the Highwire Dancer, on Black Wolf Records in March 2009. The album, which has 11 tracks, most of them originals, was produced by singer-songwriter Richard Shindell.

Duvekot's next release, Toward the Thunder, was her fourth full-length studio album.

== Discography ==
=== Solo albums ===
- Little Peppermints (2002)
- Boys, Flowers, Miles (2005)
- Big Dream Boulevard (Black Wolf Records, 2006)
- Snapshots (Black Wolf Records, 2008)
- The Near Demise of the Highwire Dancer (Black Wolf Records, 2009)
- Antje Duvekot LIVE from all over the place (2011)
- New Siberia (2012)
- Toward The Thunder (2016)
- New Wild West (2023)

=== Collaborative albums ===
- Winterbloom: Winter Traditions (2009)

(with Anne Heaton, Meg Hutchinson, and Natalia Zukerman)

- 'SOLAS: Reunion – A Decade of SOLAS' (2006)
