= The Best of Nanci Griffith =

Greatest hits album by Nanci Griffith
- Released: 1993
- Genres: Folk, country
- Length: 68:09
- Label: MCA

Nanci Griffith chronology
The MCA Years: A Retrospective (1993)	The Best of Nanci Griffith (1993)	Flyer (1994)

The Best of Nanci Griffith is a 1993 UK album release by Nanci Griffith. It is very similar to The MCA Years: A Retrospective but with several different tracks. Two of the tracks on The Best of Nanci Griffith had previously never been released on any album. The first of these, "Tumble And Fall", was later released on The Complete MCA Studio Recordings. The second previously unreleased song, "The Road To Aberdeen", was recorded live at The Royal Albert Hall in London in June 1993.

== Track listing ==
All tracks are written by Nanci Griffith, except where indicated.

No.	Title	Writer(s)	Original album	Length
1.	"Trouble In the Fields"	Nanci Griffith, Rick West	Lone Star State of Mind	3:18
2.	"From a Distance"	Julie Gold	Lone Star State of Mind	4:10
3.	"Speed of the Sound of Loneliness"	John Prine	Other Voices, Other Rooms	4:20
4.	"Love at the Five and Dime (live)"		One Fair Summer Evening	4:44
5.	"Listen to the Radio"		Storms	3:48
6.	"Gulf Coast Highway" (duet with Mac MacAnally)"	Nanci Griffith, James Hooker, Danny Flowers	Little Love Affairs	3:06
7.	"I Wish It Would Rain"		Little Love Affairs	2:48
8.	"Ford Econoline"		Lone Star State of Mind	2:10
9.	"If Wishes Were Changes"	Nanci Griffith, James Hooker	Storms	3:48
10.	"The Wing and the Wheel (live)"		One Fair Summer Evening	2:15
11.	"Late Night Grande Hotel"		Late Night Grande Hotel	3:35
12.	"From Clare to Here"	Ralph McTell	Other Voices, Other Rooms	5:10
13.	"It's Just Another Morning Here"		Late Night Grande Hotel	4:23
14.	"Tumble and Fall"		"B" side from the CD single "Heaven"	2:40
15.	"There's a Light Beyond These Woods (Mary Margaret)"		Lone Star State of Mind	4:21
16.	"Outbound Plane"		Little Love Affairs	2:39
17.	"Lone Star State of Mind"	Pat Alger, Gene Levine, Fred Koller	Lone Star State of Mind	3:56
18.	"It's a Hard Life Wherever You Go"		Storms	4:02
19.	"The Road to Aberdeen (live)"		Recorded live at the Royal Albert Hall, London, June 1993	2:56
Total length:				68:09

== Charts ==
Chart (1993)	Peak position
European Albums (Eurotipsheet)	64
Irish Albums (IFPI)	5
UK Albums (Official Charts)	27
UK Country Albums (Official Charts)	3
