= The MCA Years: A Retrospective =

Compilation album by Nanci Griffith
- Released: 1993
- Genres: Folk, country
- Length: 69:23
- Label: MCA

Nanci Griffith chronology
Other Voices, Other Rooms (1993)	The MCA Years: A Retrospective (1993)	The Best of Nanci Griffith (1993)

Professional ratings
Review scores
Source	Rating
AllMusic	4/5 stars

The MCA Years: A Retrospective was released on MCA Records in 1993, and contains songs from Nanci Griffith's five MCA albums: Lone Star State of Mind (1987), Little Love Affairs (1988), One Fair Summer Evening (1988), Storms (1989), and Late Night Grande Hotel (1991).

== Track listing ==
All tracks are written by Nanci Giffith, except where indicated.

No.	Title	Writer(s)	Length
1.	"Trouble in the Fields"	Griffith, Rick West	3:21
2.	"From a Distance"	Julie Gold	4:12
3.	"I Don't Wanna Talk About Love"	Griffith, James Hooker	4:10
4.	"Deadwood, South Dakota (live)"	Eric Taylor	5:10
5.	"Love at the Five and Dime (live)"		7:21
6.	"Listen to the Radio"		3:48
7.	"Gulf Coast Highway"	Griffith, James Hooker, Danny Flowers	3:03
8.	"I Wish It Would Rain"		2:41
9.	"Ford Econoline"		2:14
10.	"So Long Ago"		4:07
11.	"If Wishes Were Changes"	Griffith, James Hooker	3:48
12.	"The Wing and the Wheel (live)"		3:14
13.	"Late Night Grande Hotel"		3:33
14.	"It's Just Another Morning Here"		4:23
15.	"Drive-In Movies and Dashboard Lights"		3:14
16.	"There's a Light Beyond These Woods (Mary Margaret)"		4:24
17.	"Outbound Plane"	Griffith, Tom Russell	2:39
18.	"It's a Hard Life Wherever You Go"		4:00
Total length:			69:22
