= Country Gold =

Greatest hits album by Nanci Griffith
- Released: March 11, 1997
- Genres: Folk, country
- Label: MCA
- Producers: Tony Brown, Glyn Johns, Nanci Griffith, Carl Michelakos (compilation)

Nanci Griffith chronology
| Flyer (1994) | Country Gold (1997) | Blue Roses from the Moons (1997) |

Country Gold is a 10-track compilation CD of songs taken from Nanci Griffith's MCA Records albums released by the label from 1986 to 1991: Lone Star State of Mind, Little Love Affairs, One Fair Summer Evening. and Storms. It was released on March 11, 1997.

== Track listing ==
All tracks composed by Nanci Griffith except where indicated.

1. "Trouble in the Fields" 3:18
2. "Cold Hearts/Closed Minds" 2:40
3. "I Knew Love" (Roger Brown) 3:17
4. "Anyone Can Be Somebody's Fool" 2:39
5. "From a Distance" (Julie Gold) 4:10
6. "Never Mind" (Harlan Howard) 3:42
7. "Once in a Very Blue Moon" (live) (Patrick Alger, Eugene Levine) 2:16
8. "I Wish It Would Rain" 2:38
9. "Listen to the Radio" 3:45
10. "Drive-In Movies and Dashboard Lights" 3:14
