= Other Voices, Too (A Trip Back to Bountiful) =

Studio album by Nanci Griffith
- Released: July 21, 1998
- Recorded: December 1997 – April 1998
- Genre: Country folk
- Length: 72:33
- Label: Elektra
- Producers: Jim Rooney, Nanci Griffith, Don Gehman

Nanci Griffith chronology
Blue Roses from the Moons (1997)	Other Voices, Too (A Trip Back to Bountiful) (1998)	The Dust Bowl Symphony (1999)

Professional ratings
Review scores
Source	Rating
AllMusic	4.5/5 stars
Chicago Tribune	(positive)
Los Angeles Times	3/4 stars
Rolling Stone	3.5/5 stars

Other Voices, Too (A Trip Back to Bountiful) is a 1998 album by Nanci Griffith. It is her 13th studio album. Following the Grammy Award-winning album Other Voices, Other Rooms, Other Voices, Too (A Trip Back to Bountiful) is the second album of cover songs written by various singer-songwriters.

The album includes many guest musicians, including Guy Clark, The Crickets, Odetta, Lucinda Williams, Rodney Crowell, Steve Earle, Lyle Lovett, John Prine, Emmylou Harris, Gillian Welch, Jimmie Dale Gilmore, Tom Rush, and Richard Thompson.

== Critical reception ==
People wrote, "not only does this album benefit from the sweet growl of Griffith’s sensuous voice, [but] it also reflects her wondrous curiosity and eclectic tastes in music."

== Track listing ==
1. "Wall of Death" (Richard Thompson) 3:09
2. "Who Knows Where the Time Goes" (Sandy Denny) 5:34
3. "You Were on My Mind" (Sylvia Fricker) 2:46
4. "Walk Right Back" (Sonny Curtis) 2:33
5. "Canadian Whiskey" (Tom Russell) 2:59
6. "Desperados Waiting for a Train" (Guy Clark) 4:16
7. "Wings of a Dove" (Bob Ferguson) 2:51
8. "Dress of Laces" (John Grimaudo, Saylor White) 4:55
9. "Summer Wages" (Ian Tyson) 4:02
10. "He Was a Friend of Mine" (Traditional) 3:11
11. "Hard Times Come Again No More" (Stephen Collins Foster) 5:43
12. "Wasn't That a Mighty Storm" (Traditional) 5:01
13. "Deportee (Plane Wreck at Los Gatos)" (Woody Guthrie, Martin Hoffman) 5:21
14. "Yarrington Town" (Mickie Merkens) 4:23
15. "I Still Miss Someone" (Johnny Cash, Roy Cash Jr) 3:38
16. "Try the Love" (Pat McLaughlin) 3:45
17. "The Streets of Baltimore" (Harlan Howard, Tompall Glaser) 2:35
18. "Darcy Farrow" (Tom Campbell, Steve Gillette) 2:33
19. "If I Had a Hammer (The Hammer Song)" (Pete Seeger, Lee Hays) 2:48

== Personnel ==
- Nanci Griffith - vocals, acoustic guitar, gut-string guitar
- Meghann Ahern – gut-string guitar
- J. I. Allison – drums
- Shawn Camp – vocals
- Nollaig Casey – fiddle
- John Catchings – cello
- Frank Christian – vocals, acoustic guitar, gut-string guitar, 12-string guitar
- Guy Clark – vocals, acoustic guitar
- Susan Cowsill – vocals, gut-string guitar
- Rodney Crowell – vocals, duet, acoustic guitar
- Sonny Curtis – acoustic guitar, gut-string guitar
- Mary Custy – fiddle
- Ron de la Vega – vocals, bass, cello, gut-string guitar, tic tac
- Philip Donnelly – vocals, acoustic guitar
- Steve Earle – vocals, gut-string guitar
- Béla Fleck – banjo
- Nina Gerber – acoustic guitar
- Jimmie Dale Gilmore – vocals
- Julie Gold – gut-string guitar
- Clive Gregson – electric guitar, gut-string guitar
- Andrew Hardin – vocals, acoustic guitar, tiple
- Emmylou Harris – vocals, gut-string guitar
- Jamie Hartford – vocals
- Bill Hearne – gut-string guitar, acoustic guitar
- Bonnie Hearne – gut-string guitar
- Carolyn Hester – gut-string guitar
- Tish Hinojosa – vocals, gut-string guitar
- Peter Holsapple – mandolin
- James Hooker – vocals, gut-string guitar, organ, piano, synthesizer
- Jay Joyce – vocals, gut-string guitar
- Lucy Kaplansky – vocals, gut-string guitar
- Fats Kaplin – button accordion, fiddle, pedal steel
- Dolores Keane – gut-string guitar
- Mary Ann Kennedy – vocals
- Maura Kennedy – vocals, gut-string guitar
- Pete Kennedy – vocals, gut-string guitar, 12-string guitar
- Ray Kennedy – vocals
- Doug Lancio – vocals, acoustic guitar, electric guitar, gut-string guitar, resonator guitar
- Tom Littlefield – vocals
- Lyle Lovett – gut-string guitar
- Ian Matthews – vocals, acoustic guitar
- Joe Mauldin – bass
- Pat McInerney – drums, percussion, vocals, gut-string guitar
- Pat McLaughlin – vocals, acoustic guitar, mandolin
- John Mock – penny whistle
- Odetta – vocals, gut-string guitar
- David Olney – vocals
- John Prine – duet vocals
- Jean Ritchie – vocals, gut-string guitar
- Jim Rooney – vocals, gut-string guitar
- Darius Rucker – gut-string guitar
- Tom Rush – vocals, slide guitar
- Tom Russell – vocals, gut-string guitar
- Matthew Ryan – vocals, gut-string guitar
- Lee Satterfield – vocals, mandolin
- Sharon Shannon – button accordion
- Jim Sonefeld – gut-string guitar
- Rosalie Sorrels – vocals, gut-string guitar
- John Stewart – vocals, gut-string guitar
- Eric Taylor – vocals, gut-string guitar
- Christian Teal – violin
- Richard Thompson – Vocals, electric guitar, gut-string guitar
- Ian Tyson – vocals
- Dave Van Ronk – acoustic guitar
- Eric Von Schmidt – gut-string guitar
- Jerry Jeff Walker – acoustic guitar, vocals
- Eric Weissberg – banjo, gut-string guitar
- Gillian Welch – gut-string guitar
- Kristin Wilkinson – viola
- Lucinda Williams – acoustic guitar, vocals
- Jim Williamson – trumpet
- Brian Willoughby – acoustic guitar

== Charts ==
Chart (1998)	Peak position
Norwegian Albums (VG-lista)	21
UK Country Compilations (OCC)	2
US Billboard 200	85
