= The Complete MCA Studio Recordings =

Compilation album by Nanci Griffith
- Released: June 17, 2003
- Genres: Country, folk
- Length: 157.37
- Label: MCA Nashville
- Producer: Mike Ragogna [compilation]

Nanci Griffith chronology
Winter Marquee (2002)	The Complete MCA Studio Recordings (2003)	Hearts in Mind (2004)

The Complete MCA Studio Recordings is a compilation album spanning the five-year period, from 1987 to 1991, that Nanci Griffith spent with MCA Records. The 46-track, two-CD album features all of the songs from the four studio albums recorded on the label during these years: Lone Star State of Mind (1987), Little Love Affairs (1988), Storms (1989) and Late Night Grande Hotel (1991), as well as three previously unreleased recordings.

== Background ==
The Complete MCA Studio Recordings collects Griffith's four studio albums recorded with MCA between 1987 and 1991. The compilation chronicles a period in the label's history when it signed "left-of-center" country artists including Griffith, Steve Earle, and Lyle Lovett. When Griffith's first two albums, Lone Star State of Mind and Little Love Affairs, failed to produce a major country hit, she was moved to MCA's pop division where she released Storms and Late Night Grande Hotel, the latter of which alienated her original fan base and resulted in her being dropped by the label. After a stint on Elektra Records, Griffith signed in 2002 with Rounder Records, which ironically had a distribution deal with MCA. This gave the label a significant stake in Griffith's early recordings and prompted the release of The Complete MCA Studio Recordings among other compilations. This set includes three bonus tracks that were previously unavailable in the United States—"Tumble and Fall", "Wooden Heart", and "Stand Your Ground".

== Reviews ==
Professional ratings
Review scores
Source	Rating
AllMusic	4.5/5 stars
The Music Box	3.5/5 stars
PopMatters	(favorable)

In a review of The Complete MCA Studio Recordings for PopMatters, Andrew Gilstrap called it "a definitive collection" for Griffith fans and noted that it "makes more apparent the stylistic growth she experienced during those years." AllMusic writer William Ruhlmann remarked that upon listening to the entire set, "The first two albums are no more country than Griffith's early 'folk' albums, and the last two are not so 'pop.'" Ruhlmann added that the songs that make up the compilation "stand up well a decade later and are likely to sound just as good many decades hence."

== Track listing ==
All tracks composed by Nanci Griffith; except where indicated

=== Disc 1 ===
1. "Tumble And Fall" 2:41
2. "Lone Star State of Mind" (Fred Koller, Pat Alger, Gene Levine) 3:58
3. "Cold Hearts/Closed Minds" 2:42
4. "From a Distance" (Julie Gold) 4:12
5. "Beacon Street" 2:52
6. "Nickel Dreams" (Mac McAnally, Don Lowery) 2:50
7. "Sing One for Sister" (Robert Earl Keen Jnr) 3:22
8. "Ford Econoline" 2:13
9. "Trouble in the Fields" (Griffith, Rick West) 3:20
10. "Love In A Memory" 3:19
11. "Let It Shine on Me" (Paul Kennerley) 3:01
12. "There's A Light Beyond These Woods (Mary Margaret)" 4:23
13. "Anyone Can Be Somebody's Fool" 2:40
14. "I Knew Love" (Roger Brown) 3:17
15. "Never Mind" (Harlan Howard) 3:42
16. "Love Wore A Halo (Back Before The War)" 3:23
17. "So Long Ago" 4:09
18. "Gulf Coast Highway" (Griffith, James Hooker, Danny Flowers) 3:06
19. "Little Love Affairs" (Griffith, James Hooker) 3:09
20. "I Wish It Would Rain" 2:39
21. "Outbound Plane" (Griffith, Tom Russell) 2:40
22. "I Would Change My Life" (Robert Earl Keen Jnr) 3:08
23. "Sweet Dreams Will Come" (John Stewart) 4:26
24. "Wooden Heart" (Bert Kaempfert, Kay Twomey, Fred Wise, Ben Weisman) 2:28

=== Disc 2 ===
1. "I Don't Want To Talk About Love" (Griffith, James Hooker) 4:07
2. "Drive-In Movies And Dashboard Lights" 3:13
3. "You Made This Love A Teardrop" 3:11
4. "Brave Companion Of The Road" 3:19
5. "Storms" (Eric Taylor) 3:11
6. "It's A Hard Life Wherever You Go" 4:01
7. "If Wishes Were Changes" (Griffith, James Hooker) 3:44
8. "Listen To The Radio" 3:48
9. "Leaving The Harbor" 3:28
10. "Radio Fragile" (Griffith, James Hooker) 5:34
11. "It's Just Another Morning Here" 4:23
12. "Late Night Grande Hotel" 3:35
13. "It's Too Late" 2:18
14. "Fields of Summer" (4:19
15. "Heaven" (Julie Gold) 3:29
16. "The Power Lines" (Griffith, Pat Alger, James Hooker) 2:38
17. "Hometown Streets" (Griffith, James Hooker) 4:11
18. "Down 'N' Outer" 2:46
19. "One Blade Shy Of A Sharp Edge" 2:59
20. "The Sun, Moon, and Stars" (Vince Bell) 4:24
21. "San Diego Serenade" (Tom Waits) 3:27
22. "Stand Your Ground" (Griffith, James Hooker) 3:51
