= More than a Whisper: Celebrating the Music of Nanci Griffith =

Compilation album by various artists
- Released: September 22, 2023
- Genre: Folk, Americana, country folk
- Length: 58:33
- Label: Rounder

Singles from More than a Whisper
- 1. "Love at the Five and Dime" Released: July 14, 2023; 2. "Love Wore a Halo (Back Before the War)" Released: August 11, 2023; 3. "Listen to the Radio" Released: September 1, 2023

More than a Whisper: Celebrating the Music of Nanci Griffith is a compilation album featuring various artists covering songs that were written or recorded by American singer-songwriter Nanci Griffith. It was released on September 22, 2023, by Rounder Records as a tribute to Griffith, who died in 2021 and recorded her albums Ruby's Torch and The Loving Kind on the label. Proceeds from the album were donated to Cumberland Heights, a non-profit treatment facility in Nashville, Tennessee that specializes in assistance of individuals and their immediate families who are affected by drug addiction and alcoholism. It was one of two albums that were released in 2023 to honor Griffith's legacy, the first being the box set Working in Corners.

== Promotion ==
Three promotional singles were released in anticipation of the album. The first promotional single, "Love at the Five and Dime" (performed by John Prine and Kelsey Waldon), was released on July 14, 2023. The second promotional single, "Love Wore a Halo (Back Before the War)" (performed by Emmylou Harris), was released on August 11, 2023. The third and final promotional single, "Listen to the Radio" (performed by Billy Strings and Molly Tuttle), was released on September 1, 2023.

== Track listing ==
More than a Whisper: Celebrating the Music of Nanci Griffith track listing
No.	Title	Performer(s)	Length
1.	"You Can't Go Home Again"	Sarah Jarosz	4:41
2.	"Love at the Five and Dime"	John Prine and Kelsey Waldon	4:49
3.	"Listen to the Radio"	Billy Strings and Molly Tuttle	4:00
4.	"Love Wore a Halo (Back Before the War)"	Emmylou Harris	3:40
5.	"Trouble in the Fields"	Lyle Lovett and Kathy Mattea	3:29
6.	"Gulf Coast Highway"	Brandy Clark	3:28
7.	"Outbound Plane"	Shawn Colvin	4:04
8.	"Radio Fragile"	Ida Mae	5:04
9.	"It's a Hard Life Wherever You Go"	Steve Earle	4:41
10.	"Late Night Grande Hotel"	Aaron Lee Tasjan	4:10
11.	"Ford Econoline"	Todd Snider	2:39
12.	"Banks of the Pontchartrain"	Iris DeMent	4:30
13.	"More than a Whisper"	Mary Gauthier	4:41
14.	"From a Distance"	The War and Treaty	4:37
Total length:			58:33
