= Winter Marquee =

Live album by Nanci Griffith
- Released: September 24, 2002
- Recorded: May 29, 2002
- Genres: Folk, country
- Length: 58:45
- Label: Rounder
- Producers: Nanci Griffith, Monty Hitchcock

Nanci Griffith chronology
| From A Distance: The Very Best Of Nanci Griffith (2002) | Winter Marquee (2002) | The Complete MCA Studio Recordings (2003) |

Professional ratings
Review scores
| Source | Rating |
|---|---|
| AllMusic | 3/5 stars |
| No Depression | (favorable) |
| Rolling Stone | 3/5 stars |

Winter Marquee is a live album by folk singer Nanci Griffith. It was her first album for Rounder Records after leaving Elektra Records. Recorded live during the Clock Without Hands tour in spring 2002, this album grew from the original wish to capture just one live song (Phil Ochs' "What's That I Hear") into a 14-track live CD album, Griffith's first live recording since One Fair Summer Evening (1988). On May 29, 2002, at the historic Tennessee Theatre in Knoxville, a live performance was filmed, and released on DVD under the same name. During the recording of both the album and the DVD, Griffith was joined on stage by Emmylou Harris, Tom Russell and Andrew Hardin.

== Track listing ==
All tracks composed by Nanci Griffith; except where indicated

1. "Speed of the Sound of Loneliness" (John Prine) 4:40
2. "I Wish It Would Rain" 2:36
3. "Boots of Spanish Leather" (Bob Dylan) 6:34
4. "Two for the Road" 2:59
5. "Listen to the Radio" 3:51
6. "There's a Light Beyond These Woods (Mary Margaret)" 4:46
7. "Gulf Coast Highway" (Griffith, James Hooker, Danny Flowers) 3:32
8. "The Flyer" 4:46
9. "Good Night, New York" (Julie Gold) 5:06
10. "Traveling Through This Part Of You" 4:19
11. "Last Train Home" 3:05
12. "I'm Not Drivin' These Wheels (Bring the Prose to the Wheel)" 3:40
13. "What's That I Hear" (Phil Ochs) 4:08
14. "White Freight Liner" (Townes Van Zandt) 5:01

== Personnel ==
- Nanci Griffith - vocals, acoustic guitars
- James Hooker - keyboards, vocals
- Pat McInerney - drums, percussion
- Ron de la Vega - bass, cello, vocals
- Chas Williams - electric guitars, dobro
- Le Ann Etheridge - acoustic guitar, vocals
- Emmylou Harris - harmony vocal on "Good Night, New York"
- Tom Russell - acoustic guitar & additional vocals on "What's That I Hear" & "White Freight Liner"
- Andrew Hardin - acoustic guitar on "What's That I Hear" & "White Freight Liner"

== Charts ==
| Chart (2004) | Peak position |
|---|---|
| US Top Country Albums (Billboard) | 45 |
