= There's a Light Beyond These Woods =

Studio album by Nanci Griffith
- Released: 1978
- Recorded: December 1977 – January 1978
- Studios: Pecan Street Studios, Austin, Texas
- Genre: Folk
- Length: 37:03
- Labels: B.F. Deal Records (1978); Featherbed Records (1982); Philo Records; Rounder Records (1986)
- Producers: Mike Williams and Nanci Griffith

Nanci Griffith chronology
There's a Light Beyond These Woods (1978)	Poet in My Window (1982)

Professional ratings
Review scores
Source	Rating
AllMusic	2.5/5 stars

There's a Light Beyond These Woods was singer-songwriter Nanci Griffith's debut album. It was recorded live to two-track over four days, December 9 to 11, 1977 and January 3, 1978, in Austin, Texas. Griffith wrote most of its songs, as she would on almost all of her subsequent albums.

The album cover features a photograph of Griffith taken in the autumn of 1978, tinted by Frank Golden, as well as lettering by her then husband, Eric Taylor. The cover was designed by Pat Alger and Griffith's father, Marlin Griffith.

in 2023, the album was re-released as part of a box set of Griffith’s first four albums, Working in Corners.

== Critical reception ==
AllMusic's Ronnie D. Lankford, Jr., wrote, "In retrospect, There's a Light Beyond These Woods sounds better because it sticks closer its folk roots. Fans only familiar with Griffith's later work will enjoy watching a young poet find her muse."

Rick Teverbaugh of Country Standard Time wrote of the album, "It was a bold venture because all but two of the nine songs were penned by Griffith. The instrumentation is sparse and the arrangements do nothing to get in the way of the songs' messages but also do very little to enhance the listening experience. It was recorded live with no overdubs in four studio dates. Her voice, even back in 1978, was striking and self-assured yet nowhere near the finely-tuned device that it would become in just six short years."

Louis Black of The Austin Chronicle wrote "Nanci Griffith's songs have always taken me back to those places. Reminded me how light shone through warped kitchen windows, how snow-covered mornings smelled, how a partner looked moving through the house. Griffith's songs develop like Polaroids of lost moments, often of almost mundane subjects – not great passion, but the way the bathtub tilted or heading outdoors to bring in oranges for juice. Photos I'd thought were long lost. Griffith's songs made me realize those snapshots will always be with me in some way."

== LP Track listing ==
All tracks are written by Nanci Griffith except as indicated.

Side one
No.	Title	Writer(s)	Length
1.	"I Remember Joe"		4:23
2.	"Alabama Soft Spoken Blues"	Nanci Griffith, Maggie Graham	3:47
3.	"Michael's Song"		4:01
4.	"Song for Remembered Heroes"		3:23
5.	"West Texas Sun"		3:43

Side two
No.	Title	Writer(s)	Length
1.	"There's a Light Beyond These Woods (Mary Margaret)"		4:35
2.	"Dollar Matinee"	Eric Taylor	4:51
3.	"Montana Backroads"	Bruce Carlson	4:59
4.	"John Philip Griffith"		4:06
Total length:			37:48

== Personnel ==
- Nanci Griffith – lead vocals, acoustic guitar
- Eric Taylor – lead vocals and acoustic guitar on "Dollar Matinee"
- Tom Pittman – banjo
- Stephen Doster – acoustic lead guitar
- Rick West – acoustic lead guitar, dobro, mandolin
- Tom Ellis – mandolin on "Montana Backroads"
- Hugh Sparks – bass guitar, supporting vocals
- Paul Kelly – bass guitar
- John Hagen – cello
- Mike Williams – 12-string guitar, wind chimes, supporting vocals
- Richard Cooper – electric piano on "Alabama Soft Spoken Blues"
- Carla Cain – supporting vocals
- Lela Cain – supporting vocals
- Maggie Graham – supporting vocals
- Franci Files – supporting vocals
- Frank Delvy – supporting vocals

Tracklisting and Personnel verified from the CD liner notes. The CD track listing is the same as the LP.
