= James Hooker (musician) =

American singer-songwriter (born 1948)

- Born: James Hugh Brown Jr. July 20, 1948 (age 78); Winnsboro, South Carolina, United States
- Genres: Rock; R&B; country; Americana
- Occupations: Composer, Musician
- Instrument: Keyboards
- Years active: 1964–present
- Website: jameshookermusic.com

James Hooker (born July 20, 1948) is an American keyboard player, singer/songwriter, and composer.

== Biography ==
=== Early years ===
Hooker grew up in South Carolina. He began performing in nightclubs during his 9th-grade school year. Leaving school before entering his senior year, he moved to Charleston, South Carolina, to work in the house band The Magnificent Seven, at the Merchant Seamans Club on East Bay Street.

=== Session work ===
In 1968, Hooker became a member of the Hi Rhythm Section for HI Records at Royal Studios in South Memphis. While working with Eddie Floyd in early 1970, Hooker met and recorded with Jimi Hendrix (before Hooker changed his name from James Brown).

Hooker moved to Muscle Shoals, Alabama, in 1971, where he worked for Rick Hall as a member of the FAME Gang at FAME Studios. This was also when he began writing songs.

=== The Amazing Rhythm Aces ===
Hooker returned to Memphis in late 1972. While working on staff at Sam Phillips's recording studios, Hooker was asked to be a founding member of The Amazing Rhythm Aces. He was an active member of the band from 1975 to the early 1980s, and remains an inactive member today, but participated in reunion recordings and shows in the 1990s.

=== Steve Winwood ===
Hooker was Steve Winwood's keyboard player, including the Back in the High Life tour. "Freedom Overspill" (written by Hooker, Winwood, and George Fleming) was on Winwood's Back in the High Life album and on the soundtrack to the film Big Shots.

Hooker performed as part of the ARMS concert with Winwood at the Royal Albert Hall, as well as the ARMS American tour with Eric Clapton, Jimmy Page, Jeff Beck, Joe Cocker, Charlie Watts, and Bill Wyman.

=== Nanci Griffith ===
Hooker was Nanci Griffith's band leader for 20 years. They composed and recorded songs such as "Gulf Coast Highway" and "Hometown Streets".

=== Awards ===
In 1976, Hooker won a Grammy Award for Best Country Vocal Performance by a Duo or Group as part of the Amazing Rhythm Aces, for the song "The End Is Not in Sight (The Cowboy Tune)."

=== Personal life ===
In 2007, Hooker retired from touring and moved to Ireland, and then to Mallorca, Spain. He lives in Ireland and Spain with his wife Jessica, where he records songs and instrumentals for visual media.

== Discography ==
=== Solo albums ===
- 2009: Slow Boat To Memphis
- 2010: Hanging Out with the Boys
- 2010: Maggie´s Drawers
- 2013: Sex On the Beach

=== As a member of the Amazing Rhythm Aces ===
- 1975: Stacked Deck (ABC)
- 1976: Too Stuffed to Jump (ABC)
- 1977: Toucan Do It Too (ABC)
- 1978: Burning the Ballroom Down (ABC)
- 1979: The Amazing Rhythm Aces (ABC)
- 1980: How The Hell Do You Spell Rythum (Warner Bros.)
- 1981: Full House: Aces High (AMJ)
- 1994: Ride Again (ARA)
- 1997: Out of the Blue (Breaker)
- 1998: Chock Full of Country Goodness (ARA)
- 1999: Live In Switzerland 1998 (Blue Buffalo)
- 2000: Absolutely Live (Icehouse)

=== With Nanci Griffith ===
- 1982: Poet in My Window (Island)
- 1988: One Fair Summer Evening (MCA)
- 1988: Little Love Affairs (MCA)
- 1989: Storms (MCA)
- 1991: Late Night Grande Hotel (MCA)
- 1993: Other Voices, Other Rooms (Elektra)
- 1994: Flyer (Elektra)
- 1997: Blue Roses from the Moons (Elektra)
- 1998: Other Voices, Too (A Trip Back to Bountiful) (Elektra)
- 1999: The Dust Bowl Symphony (Elektra)
- 2001: Clock Without Hands (Elektra)
- 2002: Winter Marquee (Rounder)
- 2004: Hearts in Mind (New Door)
- 2006: Ruby's Torch (Rounder)

=== As composer ===
- 1986: Steve Winwood - Back in the High Life (Island) - track 3, "Freedom Overspill" (co-written with Steve Winwood and George Fleming)
- 1992: The Chieftains - An Irish Evening (RCA Victor) - track 4, "Little Love Affairs" (co-written with Nanci Griffith)
- 1992: Evangeline - Evangeline (Margaritaville) - track 7, "Gulf Coast Highway" (co-written with Nanci Griffith and Danny Flowers)
- 1995: 4 Runner - 4 Runner (Polygram) - track 10, "Southern Wind" (co-written with Walt Aldridge)
- 1996: Kathleen Deighton - Intuition (FatCat) - track 12, "Gulf Coast Highway"
- 2000: Danny Flowers - Forbidden Fruits and Vegetables (GrooveTone) - track 7, )"Gulf Coast Highway"
- 2003: Tom Russell - Modern Art (Hightone/Shout!) - track 13, "Gulf Coast Highway"

=== Also appears on ===
- 1975: Mac Davis - All the Love in the World (Columbia)
- 1978: Russell Smith - Russell Smith (Capitol)
- 1978: T. G. Sheppard - Daylight (Warner Bros. / Curb)
- 1978: T. G. Sheppard - T.G. (Warner Bros.)
- 1980: Paul Butterfield - North South (Bearsville)
- 1984: John Martyn - Sapphire (Island)
- 1990: John Hiatt - Slow Turning (A&M)
- 1990: Burrito Brothers / Flying Burrito Brothers - Back to Sweethearts of the Rodeo (Appaloosa)
- 1993: Sawyer Brown - Outskirts of Town (Curb / MCA)
- 1996: Ho-Hum - Local (Universal)
- 1996: Burrito Brothers / Flying Burrito Brothers - Double Barrel (Magnum)
- 1998: Gove Scrivenor - Shine On (Compass)
- 2001: Jonell Mosser - Enough Rope (Siren Songs)
- 2002: The Decoys - Shot from the Saddle (Muscle Shoals / Ace)
- 2002: Ian Gomm - Rock 'N' Roll Heart (Albion)
- 2002: Russell Smith - The End Is Not in Sight (Muscle Shoals / Ace)
- 2004: Bernie Leadon - Mirror (Really Small Entertainment)
