= Hearts in Mind =

Studio album by Nanci Griffith
- Released: October 11, 2004
- Recorded: March – July 2004
- Genres: Folk, country
- Length: 46:44 / 51:01 (US)
- Label: New Door
- Producers: Nanci Griffith, Pat McInerney

Nanci Griffith chronology
The Complete MCA Studio Recordings (2002)	Hearts in Mind (2004)	Ruby's Torch (2006)

Professional ratings
Review scores
Source	Rating
About.com	5/5 stars
AllMusic	3.5/5 stars
BBC Music	(positive)
Entertainment Weekly	C+
The Music Box	3.5/5 stars
Paste	(positive)
PopMatters	7/10 stars
Rolling Stone	3.5/5 stars
Uncut	2/5 stars
USA Today	4/4 stars

Hearts in Mind is an album by folk-country singer Nanci Griffith, which was released in Ireland and the United Kingdom on October 11, 2004. It was later released in the USA on February 1, 2005 featuring the bonus track "Our Very Own".. As with Griffith's 2001 album Clock Without Hands, Vietnam is a recurring theme ("Old Hanoi", "Heart of Indochine").

== Track listing ==
All tracks composed by Nanci Griffith; except where indicated.

1. "Simple Life" (Griffith, Elizabeth Cook) 3:06
2. "Angels" (Tom Kimmel, Jennifer Kimball) 4:34
3. "Heart of Indochine" 3:48
4. "Beautiful" 4:10
5. "Back When Ted Loved Sylvia" (LeAnn Etheridge) 4:15
6. "Mountain of Sorrow" (Julie Gold) 3:50
7. "Old Hanoi" 3:39
8. "Before" (Griffith, LeAnn Etheridge) 2:43
9. "I Love This Town" featuring Jimmy Buffett on backing vocals (Clive Gregson) 3:21
10. "Rise to the Occasion" (Ron Davies) 3:18
11. "Love Conquers All" (Griffith, Charley Stefl) 2:50
12. "Last Train Home" 3:06
13. "Big Blue Ball of War" 4:05
14. "Our Very Own" (Griffith, Keith Carradine) *(US Release Only) 4:15

== Personnel ==
- Nanci Griffith - vocals, acoustic guitar
- John Catchings - cello
- Lloyd Green - dobro
- Doug Lancio - guitar
- Jennifer Kimball - background vocals
- Cathryn Craig - background vocals

The Blue Moon Orchestra

- LeAnn Etheridge - acoustic guitar, bass guitar, harmony vocals
- Clive Gregson - acoustic and electric guitar, dobro, mandolin, accordion
- Ron de la Vega - bass guitar
- James Hooker - piano, organ, synthesizer
- Pat McInerney - drums, percussion

== Charts ==
Chart (2004)	Peak position
UK Country Albums (Official Charts)	2
