= Once in a Very Blue Moon =

Studio album by Nanci Griffith
- Released: 1985
- Recorded: June 26 – July 2, 1984
- Studios: Cowboy Arms (Nashville, Tennessee)
- Genre: Country
- Length: LP (34:32); CD (39:01)
- Label: Philo
- Producers: Jim Rooney, Nanci Griffith

Nanci Griffith chronology
Poet in My Window (1982)	Once in a Very Blue Moon (1985)	The Last of the True Believers (1986)

Once in a Very Blue Moon is the third studio album by American singer-songwriter Nanci Griffith, released in 1985. The album had more of a country sound than her previous albums. Her first two albums were backed sparsely with instrumentation, but starting with this album, the whole complement of country-styled instrumentalists can be heard. Noted country musicians performing on the album include banjo player, Béla Fleck, champion fiddle player, Mark O'Connor, and pedal steel master, Lloyd Green. The title song was covered by Dolly Parton, who included her version on her Real Love album in 1985.

== Critical reception ==
Professional ratings
Review scores
Source	Rating
AllMusic	5/5 stars
The Rolling Stone Album Guide	3/5 stars

Vik Iyengar at AllMusic wrote, "Nanci Griffith finds her voice on her third studio album, Once in a Very Blue Moon. This is the album where she established her musical identity – she is at home in many genres (which perhaps explains why she never gets played on formatted radio stations), and seamlessly blends folk, bluegrass, and country with a group of stellar musicians, including guitarist Pat Alger and a young banjo player named Béla Fleck." He concluded the review with, "This album marks the emergence of a major talent."

== Track listing ==
All tracks are written by Nanci Griffith, unless otherwise noted.

LP (Side one)
No.	Title	Writer(s)	Length
1.	"Ghost in the Music"	Nanci Griffith; Eric Taylor	2:46
2.	"Love Is a Hard Waltz"		3:07
3.	"Roseville Fair"	Bill Staines	2:56
4.	"Mary and Omie"		4:27
5.	"Friend Out in the Madness"		2:39
6.	"Time Alone"		1:57

LP (Side two)
No.	Title	Writer(s)	Length
1.	"Ballad of Robin Winter-Smith"	Richard Dobson	3:12
2.	"Daddy Said"		2:32
3.	"Once in a Very Blue Moon"	Pat Alger; Eugene Levine	2:31
4.	"I'm Not Drivin' These Wheels"		3:14
5.	"Year down in New Orleans"		2:26
6.	"Spin on a Red Brick Floor"		2:45
Total length:			34:32

CD
No.	Title	Writer(s)	Length
1.	"Ghost in the Music"	Nanci Griffith; Eric Taylor	2:48
2.	"Love Is a Hard Waltz"		3:10
3.	"Roseville Fair"	Bill Staines	2:59
4.	"Mary & Omie"		4:28
5.	"Friend Out in the Madness"		2:41
6.	"I'm Not Drivin' These Wheels"		3:17
7.	"Time Alone"		2:01
8.	"Ballad of Robin Winter-Smith"	Richard Dobson	3:14
9.	"Daddy Said"		2:35
10.	"Once in a Very Blue Moon"	Pat Alger; Eugene Levine	2:34
11.	"If I Were the Woman You Wanted"	Lyle Lovett	3:54
12.	"Year down in New Orleans"		2:28
13.	"Spin on a Red Brick Floor"		2:52
Total length:			39:01

== Personnel ==
- Nanci Griffith – acoustic guitar, lead vocals, harmony vocals
- Pat Alger – acoustic guitar, "Mark Howard's high-string guitar"
- John Catchings – cello
- Philip Donnelly – electric guitar, "sea gulls"
- Stephen Doster – acoustic guitar, electric guitar
- Béla Fleck – banjo
- Denice Franke – harmony vocals
- Lloyd Green – dobro, pedal steel
- Mark Howard – acoustic rhythm guitar, high-strung guitar
- Roy Huskey Jr. – upright bass
- Lyle Lovett – harmony vocals
- Terry Mcmillan – harmonica
- Kenny Malone – percussion
- Mark O'Connor – piccolo mandolin, mandolin, fiddle, mandola
- Ralph Vitello – piano, synthesizer
- Jack and Gertie Miller – "the bottom line"

== Production ==
- Producer – Nanci Griffith
- Cover Design – Nanci Griffith, Bill Narum
- Cover Lettering – Bill Narum
- Producer – Jim Rooney
- Mastered by – Jim Lloyd
- Executive Producer – Wayne R. Miller
- Cover Photography – Daniel Schaefer, Wayne R. Miller
  - Front and back cover were shot at The Blue Moon Cafe, Austin, Texas
- Back Cover Diners – Humphrey Brown, Sr., Jacqui Brown, Jason Brown, Humphrey Brown, Jr., Nanci Griffith
- Graphics – Marlin D. Griffith, Josephine Gibson

Track listing and credits adapted from the album's liner notes.
