= Jim Rooney (music producer) =

American musician (born 1938)

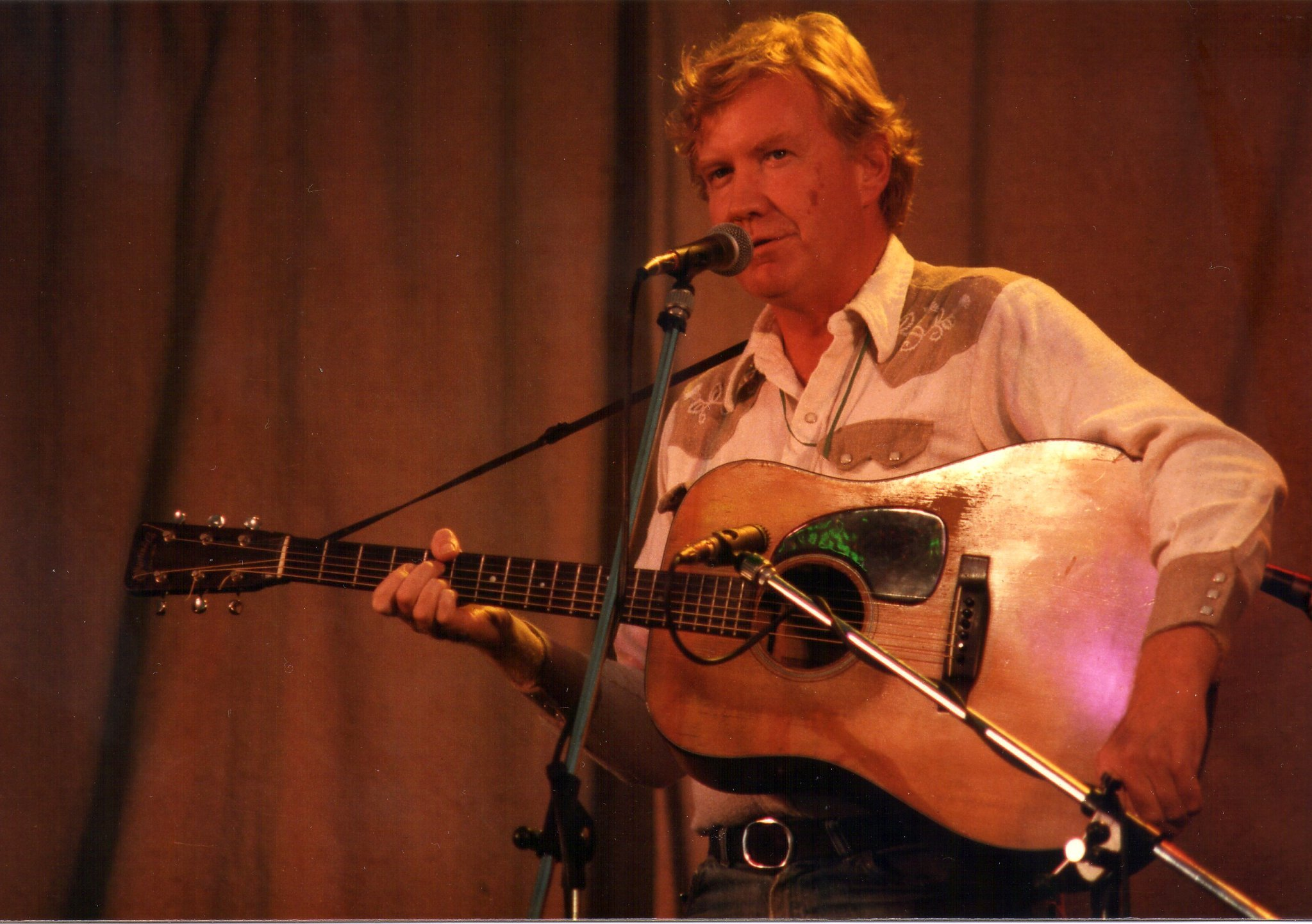
- Jim Rooney on stage at the 1985 Cambridge Folk Festival

Background information
- Born: January 28, 1938 (age 88)
- Origin: Boston, Massachusetts, United States
- Genres: Country, folk, bluegrass
- Occupation: Record producer

Jim Rooney (born January 28, 1938) is a producer, performer, writer, and pioneer in Americana music. He is also a songwriter, talent coordinator and sound engineer.

Pioneer of the “Folk revival” and partner of banjoist Bill Keith, he has been best known for his work as a music producer since the 1980s. His credits include Nanci Griffith's Other Voices, Other Rooms (which earned Rooney a Grammy Award for production), Hal Ketchum's Past the Point of Rescue, Iris DeMent's Infamous Angel, John Prine's Aimless Love and many other widely hailed albums. In recognition for his contribution to Americana music, Rooney received a lifetime achievement award from the Americana Music Association in 2009.

== Pioneering guitarist and singer of the Americana genre ==
Rooney was a pioneer in the genre that would come to be labeled as Americana. Student at the prestigious private Roxbury Latin School in Boston, he discovered bluegrass music with the Confederate Mountaineers (The Lilly Brothers: Bea and Everett, Tex Logan and Don Stover. Inspired to take up music by the sounds of Hank Williams and Leadbelly he heard on the radio, he bought his first guitar in 1954, which he taught himself to play. He began performing at the Hillbilly Ranch at just 16 years old. In 1956, he entered Amherst College as undergraduate in classics student. It was there that he met an up-and-coming banjo player named Bill Keith, who would revolutionize bluegrass banjo playing, and who would episodically be his partner for the rest of his life. After graduating from Amherst College in 1960, he went on to take a master's degree in classical literature at Harvard University.

In 1962, the Bill Keith and Jim Rooney recorded an album with mandolinist Joe Val: Bluegrass Livin' on the Mountain for Prestige Folklore. In 1964, when Bill Keith was hired for a year by the “father of bluegrass” Bill Monroe, a Fulbright grant enabled Jim Rooney to spend a year in Greece. On his return, he put an end to his studies and accepted the position of manager of Club 47, a famous café in Harvard Square, Cambridge, where he and Bill Keith had performed in 1962. Jim Rooney then used his experience at Club 47 to land a series of jobs managing festivals, such as New Orleans Folklife in Washington and especially the Newport Folk Festival, where he served as director and talent coordinator. In this context, he occasionally played and sang with Bill Keith, as in Newport in 1965.

In 1969, Bill Keith and Jim Rooney were to give a concert at New York's Washington Square Church. For the occasion, they teamed up with multi-instrumentalist Eric Weissberg and violinist Richard Greene After this concert, the musicians were offered the opportunity to sign with Warner Records for an album to be entitled: ‘'Sweet moments with the Blue Velvet Band’'.

In the early 1970s, Jim Rooney moved to Woodstock, to manage Albert Grossman's Bearsville Sound Studio. At Woodstock, he reunited with Bill Keith and other musicians, including: Artie and Happy Traum, John Herald, Maria Muldaur among others. In 1972, this group of neighbors recorded “Mud Acres: Music Among Friends” (published by Rounder Records). In 1974-1976, Bill Keith and Jim Rooney toured Europe, where they recorded on the two Banjo Paris Session albums. In 1975, Jim Rooney recorded his first solo album ‘'One Day at the Time’' for Rounder Records, and then took part in the recording of Bill Keith's first album in 1976. He then moved to Nashville in 1976 to work as a sound engineer for Jack Clement, owner of the Cowboy Arms Hotel & Recording Spa recording studio. During this period, Jim Rooney played occasional festival gigs, and recorded two albums: ‘'Ready For The Times To Get Better’' and ‘'Brand New Tennessee Waltz’'.

In the early eighties, he reformed ‘'The Blue Velvet Band’' for occasional concerts, under the name ‘'New Velvet Band’', with Kenny Kosek on fiddle (in place of Richard Greene, who lives in California). He also tours Europe twice with Bill Keith, first with Peter Rowan. Later, in 1985,Bill Keith and Jim Rooney performed at the Cambridge Folk Festival (UK) with fiddler Mark O'Connor, who made his European debut.

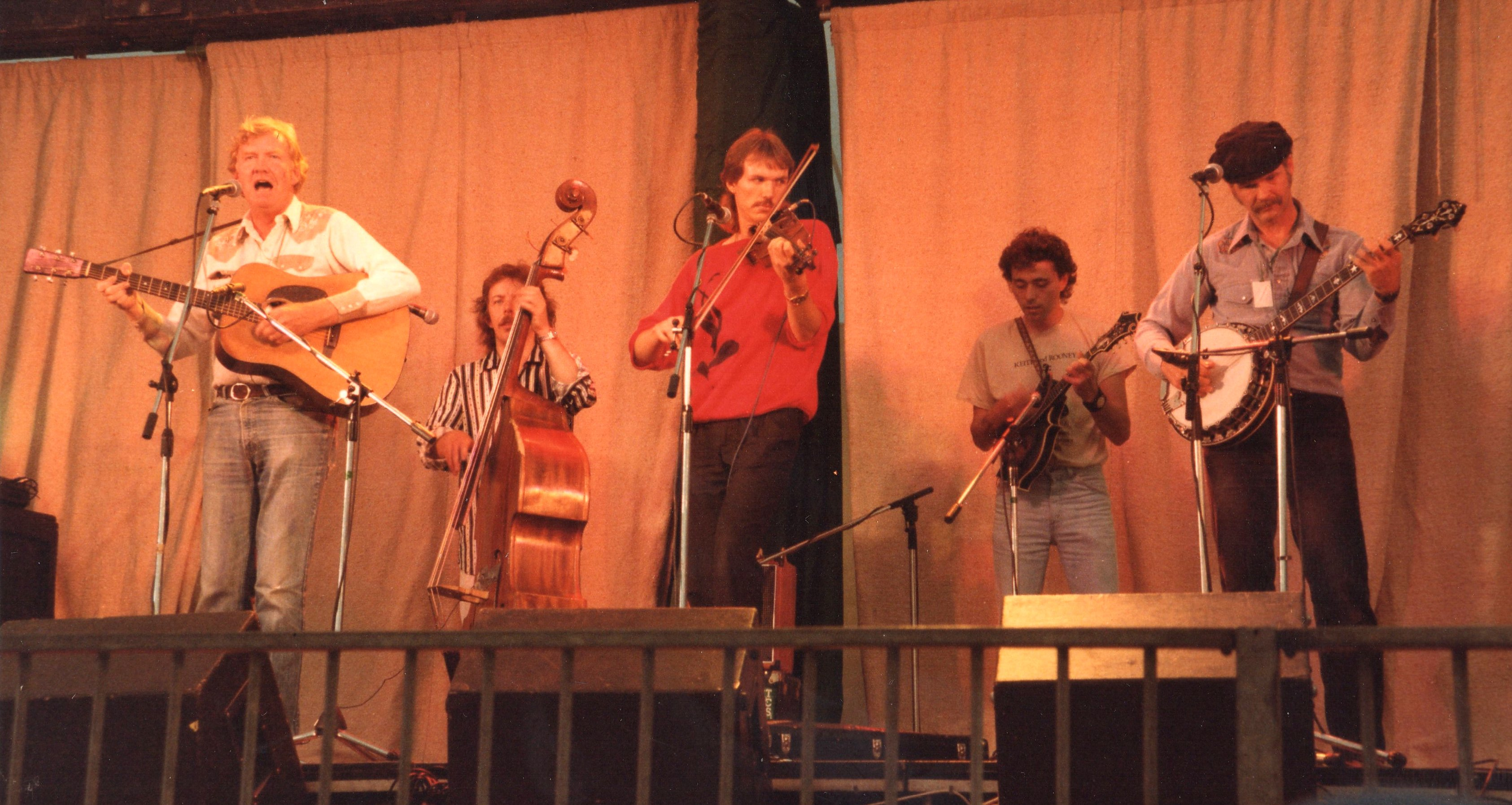
Jim Rooney, Mark O'Connor, Bill Keith + others, Cambridge 1985

Jim Rooney also took part in Bill Keith's second and third solo albums: banjoistic (Rounder, 1984) and Beating Around The Bush, (Green Linnet, 1993). In the 2000s, Jim Rooney continued to work with a group called “Rooney's Irregulars”. This is a rotating group of Nashville's finest country/folk musicians and songwriters, confederated as a supergroup. They have recorded two albums: My Own Ignorant Way (2003) and Farewell to the Tracks (2007).

== Americana music producer ==
Rooney moved to Nashville in 1976 to work as a sound engineer for Jack Clement, owner of the Cowboy Arms Hotel & Recording Spa studio. From the 1980s onwards, he became a record producer, concentrating mainly on folk and country music, and more broadly on what is known as americana. Among many productions, there are three albums by Peter Rowan (en), for Sugar Hill Records: Walls of Time (1982), The First WhipporWill (1985, devoted to Bill Monroe songs, with the participation of Bill Keith) and Bluegrass Boys (1996); six albums by John Prine (between 1984 and 2000), four albums by Tom Paxton (between 1994 and 2008) an album by Townes Van Zandt At My Windows, 1987, co-produced with Jack Clement), among others.

His longest and most significant collaborations include Iris DeMent (eight albums between 1992 and 2010) and Nanci Griffith, with three career-defining albums: Once in a Very Blue Moon (1984) The Last of the True Believers (1986, Grammy Award nominee) and Other Voices, Other Rooms (1993), which was her biggest commercial success, earning her the 1993 Grammy Award for Best Contemporary Folk Album and for which Jim Rooney also received a Grammy Award for production.

Says Griffith, "Jim Rooney is the number one reason I have a career. He gave me confidence in my writing, inspiration to write, and handed me the want ads to look for an apartment in Nashville". For banjo master Béla Fleck, who contributed to these 3 Nanci Griffith records:

The Nanci sessions were always an exercise in calling fantastic musicians with the right esthetic and letting them have their head. I learned a lot from seeing how he directed them with as little input as possible — all the while getting a very natural sound — and enabling everyone to use their own common sense. He’s just very open and natural — often kind of funny — and trusts the people he works with. His esthetic seems to be built on ﬁnding the musical truth in the situation.

== Writer, personal life ==
Rooney is the author of Bossmen: Bill Monroe and Muddy Waters (1971; reissued 2012), and an autobiography, In It for the Long Run: A Musical Odyssey (2014). He is also the coauthor, with Eric von Schmidt, of Baby Let Me Follow You Down: The Illustrated History of the Cambridge Folk Years (1979; reissued 1994).

After his career as a producer, he returned to New England, where he married Carol Langstaff, a dancer and arts promoter, and settled in a country house built in 1805. He records a series of radio programs, “In It For The Long Run”, for WFVR-FM, a community radio station in South Royalton, Vermont. He spends his time between Nashville, Vermont, and County Galway, Ireland.

== Awards ==
- In 1993, a Grammy Award for the production of Nanci Griffith's Other Voices, Other Rooms Album
- In 2009, Rooney received a Lifetime Achievement Award from the Americana Music Association.
- In 2012, the Boston Bluegrass Union (BBU) Heritage Awards (2012), in “Musician” category, was won by Bill Keith and Jim Rooney, mention Pioneering Boston-Based Bluegrass Performers.
- In 2016 he received a Lifetime Distinguished Achievement Award from the International Bluegrass Music Association (IBMA).

== Publications ==
- Bossmen : Bill Monroe and Muddy Waters JRPbooks (1971 ; reissued 2012 ISBN 9780810461062)
- Baby Let Me Follow You Down : The Illustrated History of the Cambridge Folk Years (with Eric von Schmidt) University of Massachusetts Press (1979, reissued 1994: ISBN 9780870239250).
- In It for the Long Run : A Musical Odyssey (autobiography) University of Illinois Press (2014 ISBN 9780252079818)

== Discography as artist ==
=== Personal discography ===
- 1962 Bluegrass Livin' on the Mountain, (with Bill Keith) Prestige Folklore FL 14002
- 1969 Sweet Moments With The Blue Velvet Band, Warner Bros. - Seven Arts Records WS 1802 (with Bill Keith, Eric Weisberg, Richard Greene)
- 1975 One day at the Time Rounder
- 1980 Ready For The Times To Get Better, Appaloosa, AP004
- 1980 Brand New Tennessee Waltz, Appaloosa, AP012

(2 lasts albums rreissued on CD 1994 AP067-2)

- 2003 My Own Ignorant Way, Jim Rooney & Rooney's Irregulars
- 2007 Farewell to the Tracks, Jim Rooney & Rooney's Irregulars

=== Participation ===
- 1972 Mud Acres, Music Among Fiends, (collectif), Rounder, 3001
- 1975,1977 Banjo Paris Session, vol 1 et 2 (with Bill Keith, Pierre Bensusan) Cezame
- 1976 Bill Keith, Something Auld, Something Newgrass, Something Borrowed, Something Bluegrass (1976) Rounder - CD 0084, 1998
- 1977 Mud Acres: Woodstock Mountains: More Music From Mud Acres, (collectif), Rounder 3018
- 1981 Mud Acres: Woodstock Mountains Revue : Back to Mud Acres, (collectif), Rounder 3065
- 1985 Rowan, Keith And Rooney, Hot Bluegrass (Waterfront Music – WF 016, recorded Live in 1980 in the UK)
- 1984 Bill Keith, Banjoistics, Rounder Select OG US - 148
- 1993 Bill Keith, Beating Around The Bush Green, Linet.

== Notable albums as a producer ==
Iris DeMent

- 1992 Infamous Angel, Philo/Rounder Records; 1993, Warner Brothers Records
- 1994 My Life, Warner Brothers Records
- 2004,Lifeline, Flariella Records

David Grier

- 1987 Freewheeling, Rounder Records

Nanci Griffith

- 1984 Once in a Very Blue Moon, Rounder Records
- 1986 The Last of the True Believers, Rounder Records
- 1993 Other Voices, Other Rooms, Elektra Records
- 1998 Other Voices, Too, Elektra Records

Tom Paxton 1994 Wearing the Time, Sugar Hill Records 1996 Live: For the Record Sugar Hill Records 2002 Looking for the Moon, Appleseed Records 2008 Comedians and Angels, Appleseed Records

John Prine

- 1984 Aimless Love, Oh Boy Records
- 1986 German Afternoons, Oh Boy Records
- 1988 John Prine Live, Oh Boy Records
- 1999 In Spite of Ourselves, Oh Boy Records
- 2000 Souvenirs, Oh Boy Records

Peter Rowan

- 1982 Walls of Time, Sugar Hill Records
- 1985 The First WhipporWill, Sugar Hill Records
- 1996 Bluegrass Boys, Sugar Hill Records

Townes Van Zandt

- 1987 At my window, Sugar Hill Records (co-produced with Jack Clement)

Jerry Jeff Walker

- 1987 : Gypsy Songman, Tried & True/Rykodisc Records
- 1989 : Live at Gruene Hall, Tried & True/Rykodisc Records

== Bibliography ==
- Rooney, Jim (2014). In It for the Long Run: A Musical Odyssey. Music in American Life. University of Illinois Press. ISBN 978-0252079818.
- "Jim Rooney". The Encyclopedia of Country Music (2d ed.). Oxford University Press. 2012. p. 438. ISBN 978-0195395631.
