= The Dust Bowl Symphony =

Studio album by Nanci Griffith
- Released: September 14, 1999
- Recorded: February – June 1999
- Genre: Folk / country
- Length: 53:29
- Label: Elektra
- Producer: Peter Collins

Nanci Griffith chronology
| Other Voices, Too (A Trip Back to Bountiful) (1998) | The Dust Bowl Symphony (1999) | Wings to Fly and a Place to Be: An Introduction to Nanci Griffith (2000) |

Professional ratings
Review scores
| Source | Rating |
|---|---|
| AllMusic | 2/5 stars |
| Chicago Tribune | (positive) |
| Entertainment Weekly | C+ |
| No Depression | (average) |
| Q | 3/5 stars |

The Dust Bowl Symphony is an album released by Nanci Griffith in 1999. It consists of songs Griffith had previously released on other albums, but re-recorded with an orchestral backing. The album was recorded at Abbey Road Studios with the London Symphony Orchestra. Darius Rucker duets with Griffith on "Love at The Five and Dime", and the album also has contributions from Sonny Curtis and Glen Hardin, Beth Nielsen Chapman and Griffith's own band, The Blue Moon Orchestra. The song "Waiting for Love", written by Griffith, from Blue Roses from the Moons was picked out by Griffith as giving the singer a "brief moment of being Edith Piaf".

== Track listing ==
All tracks composed by Nanci Griffith except where indicated.

1. "Trouble in the Fields" 4:36
2. "The Wing and the Wheel" 4:56
3. "These Days in an Open Book" 3:30
4. "Love at the Five and Dime" 4:53
5. "It's a Hard Life (Wherever You Go)" 4:20
6. "Late Night Grande Hotel" 2:48
7. "Tell Me How" (Buddy Holly, J.I.Allison) 3:02
8. "Not My Way Home" 4:27
9. "1937 Pre-War Kimball" 4:10
10. "Waiting For Love" 3:35
11. "Nobody's Angel" 3:50
12. "Always Will" 2:52
13. "Drops from the Faucet" (Frank Christian) 3:51
14. "Dust Bowl Reprise" (James Hooker, Michael Hanna) 2:19

== Personnel ==
- Nanci Griffith - lead vocals, harmony vocals, guitar
- Frank Christian - acoustic guitar
- Andrew Pryce Jackman - conductor, arranger
- Pat McInerney - drums, percussion
- Ron De La Vega - electric bass guitar, acoustic bass guitar
- Doug Lancio - electric guitar, acoustic guitar, resonator guitar
- John Mock - acoustic guitar, whistle
- John Catchings - cello
- Jennifer Kimball - harmony vocals
- Le Ann Etheridge - harmony vocals
- Lee Satterfield - guitar, mandolin, harmony vocals
- James Hooker - keyboards
