= Intersection (album) =

Studio album by Nanci Griffith
- Released: February 20, 2012
- Recorded: July – November 2011
- Length: 36:43
- Label: Proper Records/Hell No
- Producers: Nanci Griffith, Maura Kennedy, Pat McInerney, Pete Kennedy

Nanci Griffith chronology
The Loving Kind (2009)	Intersection (2012)

Intersection is the 20th and final album by singer-songwriter Nanci Griffith. It was released on 20 February 2012 on Proper Records/Hell No label. The album was recorded in her own home studio in Nashville and includes 12 tracks including five covers. This was Griffith’s last studio album before her retirement from the music business in 2013 and her death in 2021.

== Critical reception ==
Professional ratings
Aggregate scores
Source	Rating
Metacritic	(67/100)
Review scores
Source	Rating
AllMusic	3.5/5 stars
The Austin Chronicle	3/5 stars
BBC Music	(positive)
Mojo	3/5 stars
Paste	(8/10)
PopMatters	(7/10)
Q	3/5 stars
Record Collector	4/5 stars
Uncut	3/5 stars

Intersection was met with "generally favorable" reviews from critics. At Metacritic, which assigns a weighted average rating out of 100 to reviews from mainstream publications, this release received an average score of 67, based on 8 reviews.

== Track listing ==
All music is composed by Nanci Griffith; except where indicated.

No.	Title	Music	Length
1.	"Bethlehem Steel"		2:37
2.	"Never Going Back"	Mark Selinger	3:17
3.	"Intersection"		2:36
4.	"Waiting on a Dark Eyed Gal"	Ron Davies	3:35
5.	"Hell No (I'm Not Alright)"	Maura Kennedy	2:23
6.	"Stranded in the High Ground"	Maura Kennedy; Pat McInerney; Pete Kennedy	2:49
7.	"If I Could Only Fly"	Blaze Foley	5:10
8.	"Just Another Morning Here"		3:56
9.	"Bad Seed"	Maura Kennedy	2:44
10.	"Davey's Last Picture"	Betty Reeves; Robbin Bach	2:54
11.	"Come on Up Mississippi"		1:57
12.	"High on a Mountain Top"	Loretta Lynn	2:45

== Personnel ==
- Nanci Griffith - vocals, acoustic guitar
- Pete Kennedy - electric guitar, acoustic guitar, 12-string guitar, classical guitar, slide guitar, bass, organ, mandolin, ukulele
- Maura Kennedy - acoustic guitar, tambourine, backing vocals, vocal arrangements, lead guitar on "Hell No (I'm Not Alright)"
- Pat McInerney - percussion, backing vocals
- Eric Brace, Peter Cooper - backing vocals on "Just Another Morning Here"
- Robbin Bach - backing vocals on "Davey's Last Picture"
- Aden Barton, Bailey Shelton, Bruce MacKay, Burt Stein, Nancy Lipsitz, Phil Kaufman, Robbin Bach, Talia Barton - choir on "Come On Up Mississippi"
- Richard Bailey - 5-string banjo on "High on a Mountain Top"

== Charts ==
Chart (2012)	Peak position
Scottish Albums (Official Charts)	71
UK Country Albums (Official Charts)	1
UK Independent Albums (Official Charts)	17
US Americana/Folk Albums (Billboard)	8
US Independent Albums (Billboard)	45
