= Poet in My Window =

Studio album by Nanci Griffith
- Released: 1982
- Studios: Loma Ranch, Fredericksburg, Texas
- Genre: Folk
- Length: 33:57
- Labels: Featherbed (original), Philo
- Producers: Nanci Griffith, John Hill, Laurie Hill

Nanci Griffith chronology
There's a Light Beyond These Woods (1978)	Poet in My Window (1982)	Once in a Very Blue Moon (1985)

Poet in My Window is the second studio album by the singer-songwriter Nanci Griffith, released in 1982. A reissue of the album included a bonus track, "Can't Love Wrong", in the unusual position as the album's lead-off track, preceding all of the original tracks. Griffith wrote all but one of the album's tunes.

== Critical reception ==
Professional ratings
Review scores
Source	Rating
AllMusic	2.5/5 stars
The Encyclopedia of Popular Music	2/5 stars
MusicHound Folk: The Essential Album Guide	3/5 stars
Ottawa Citizen	3/4 stars
The Rolling Stone Album Guide	3/5 stars

Ronnie D. Lankford, Jr., for AllMusic, wrote that "While Poet in My Window is only a small step up from Nanci Griffith's debut, the album finds her inching toward the mature art of Once in a Very Blue Moon."

== Track listing ==
All tracks are written by Nanci Griffith, except "Tonight I Think I'm Gonna Go Downtown" by Jimmie Gilmore and John Reed.

No.	Title	Length
1.	"Marilyn Monroe/Neon and Waltzes"	2:42
2.	"Heart of a Miner"	3:37
3.	"Julie Anne"	3:09
4.	"You Can't Go Home Again"	3:58
5.	"October Reasons"	3:20
6.	"Wheels"	2:45
7.	"Workin' in Corners"	4:03
8.	"Waltzing with the Angels"	3:04
9.	"Trouble with Roses"	2:27
10.	"Tonight I Think I'm Gonna Go Downtown"	2:33
11.	"Poet in My Window"	2:19
Total length:		33:57

2002 Reissue bonus track
No.	Title	Note	Length
1.	"Can't Love Wrong"	Inserted as first track on reissue.	2:57

== Personnel ==
- Nanci Griffith – acoustic guitar, lead vocals, harmony vocals
- Brian Wood – acoustic lead guitar, pedal steel, harmony vocals
- Wells Young – piano, synthesizer; bass on "October Reasons"
- Eric Taylor – bass
- Evelyne Taylor – harmony vocals
- John Hill – drums
- The Gulf Coasters – harmony vocals on "Wheels"
  - Marlin Griffith – tenor
  - Al Copp – bass
  - John Grosnick – lead
  - Dick Blatter – baritone
  - Mo Rector – vocal arrangement

Production

- Nanci Griffith – producer
- John Hill – producer, engineer
- Laurie Hill – producer, engineer
- Brian Wood – associate producer
- Tom Southwick – executive producer

Track information and credits adapted from the album's liner notes.
