= Blue Roses from the Moons =

Studio album by Nanci Griffith
- Released: March 1997
- Recorded: August–December 1996
- Genre: Country
- Length: 49:01
- Label: Elektra
- Producer: Don Gehman

Nanci Griffith chronology
Country Gold (1997)	Blue Roses from the Moons (1997)	Other Voices, Too (A Trip Back to Bountiful) (1998)

Blue Roses from the Moons was the 12th studio album by Nanci Griffith, released in March 1997. The album was recorded from live takes in the studio, with her band The Blue Moon Orchestra and Jerry Allison, Sonny Curtis, and Joe B. Mauldin of The Crickets. Darius Rucker duets with Griffith on "Gulf Coast Highway". The song "Waiting for Love", written by Griffith, and commencing "Life is full of finer things / They're lost and found in the dark" was later re-recorded with symphony orchestra for the 1999 album The Dust Bowl Symphony.

== Reception ==
Professional ratings
Review scores
Source	Rating
AllMusic	3/5 stars
Chicago Tribune	3.5/4 stars
Entertainment Weekly	C−
Los Angeles Times	3/4 stars

For AllMusic, the critic Thom Owens wrote, "Though the slick sound is a little disarming for longtime fans, Griffith's songwriting remains skilled and assured, and while there aren't as many standout numbers as before, her graceful melodicism and lyricism and the professional production makes Blue Roses From the Moons a very pleasant listen."

== Track listing ==
All tracks composed by Nanci Griffith except where indicated.

1. "Everything's Comin' up Roses" (Griffith, Matthew Ryan) – 2:55
2. "Two for the Road" – 3:04
3. "Wouldn't That Be Fine" – 4:06
4. "Battlefield" (Nick Lowe, Paul Carrack) – 3:34
5. "Saint Teresa of Avila" (Griffith, Margaret Mary Graham, Mikki Griffith) – 5:20
6. "Gulf Coast Highway" (Griffith, James Hooker, Danny Flowers) – 3:30
7. "I Fought the Law" (Sonny Curtis) – 2:37
8. "Not My Way Home" – 3:54
9. "Is This All There Is?" (Griffith, Tom Littlefield) – 3:48
10. "Maybe Tomorrow" (Griffith, Harlan Howard) – 2:20
11. "Waiting for Love" – 4:11
12. "I'll Move Along" (Griffith, Tom Littlefield) – 2:39
13. "Morning Train" (Suzy Elkins, Robert Field) – 3:09
14. "She Ain't Goin' Nowhere" (Guy Clark) – 3:41

== Charts ==
Chart (1997)	Peak position
European Albums (Eurotipsheet)	89
Norwegian Albums (VG-lista)	22
Scottish Albums (Official Charts)	47
UK Albums (Official Charts)	64
UK Country Albums (Official Charts)	1
US Billboard 200	119
