= Nanci Griffith =

American singer-songwriter (1953–2021)

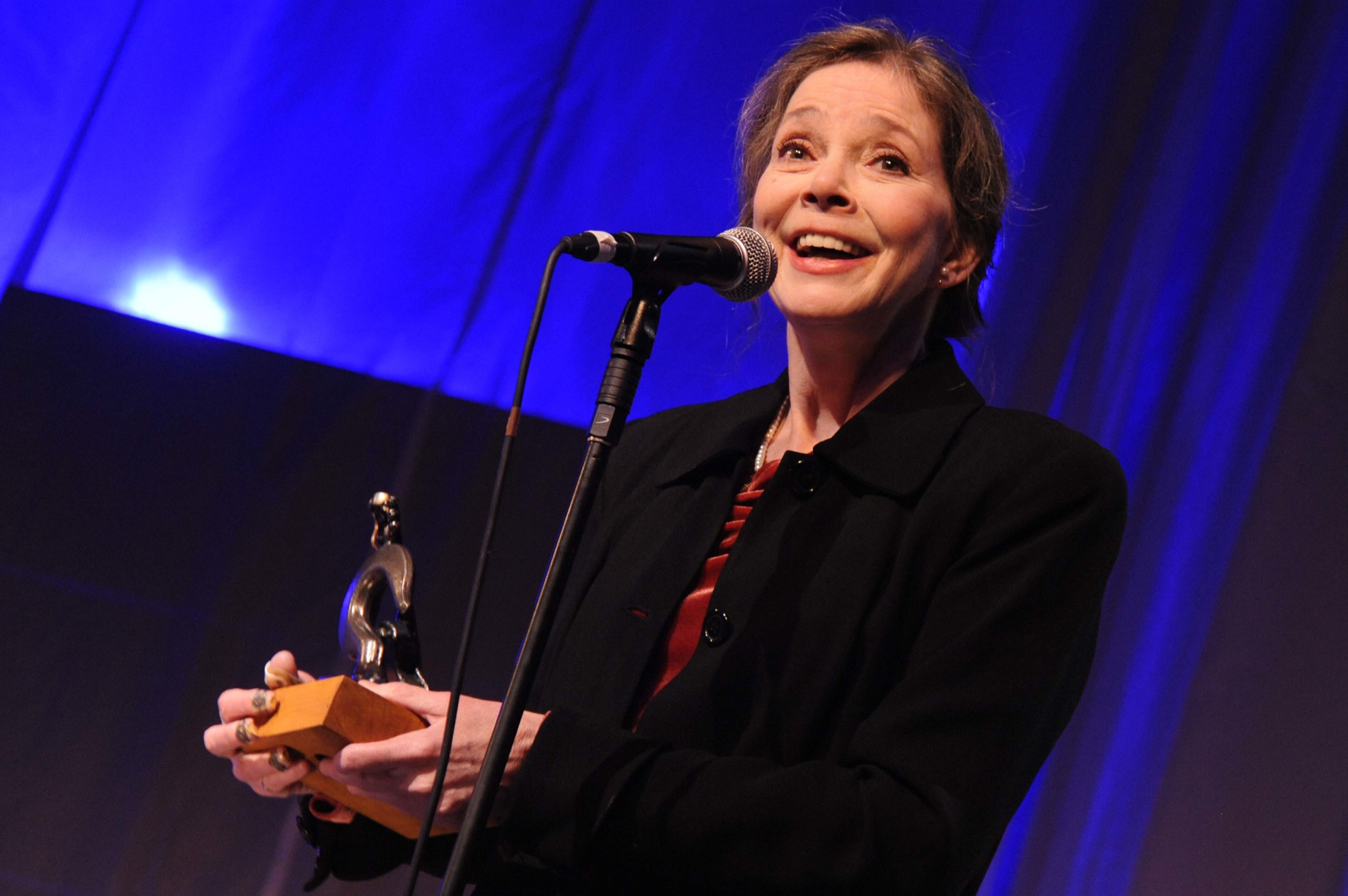
- Griffith receiving an award at the BBC Radio 2 Folk Awards in 2010

Background information
- Born: Nanci Caroline Griffith; July 6, 1953; Seguin, Texas, U.S.
- Died: August 13, 2021 (aged 68) Nashville, Tennessee, U.S.
- Genres: Country, country folk, Americana, neotraditional country
- Instruments: Vocals, acoustic guitar
- Years active: 1977–2013
- Labels: B.F. Deal, Featherbed, Philo, MCA, Elektra, Rounder, New Door
- Website: nancigriffith.com at the Wayback Machine (archived February 25, 2021)

Nanci Caroline Griffith (July 6, 1953 – August 13, 2021) was an American singer, guitarist, and songwriter. She often appeared on the PBS music program Austin City Limits, starting in 1985 during season 10. Griffith's career spanned a variety of musical genres, predominantly country, folk, and what she termed "folkabilly." She won a Grammy for Best Contemporary Folk Album in 1994 for her 1993 recording, Other Voices, Other Rooms. The album features Griffith covering the songs of artists who were her major influences. One of her better-known songs is "From a Distance," which was written and composed by Julie Gold.

Griffith toured with various other artists, including Buddy Holly's band - the Crickets (without Buddy Holly), John Prine, Iris DeMent, Suzy Bogguss, Judy Collins, and the Everly Brothers. Griffith recorded duets with many artists, among them Prine, Emmylou Harris, Mary Black, Don McLean, Jimmy Buffett, Dolores Keane, Willie Nelson, Adam Duritz (of Counting Crows), the Chieftains, John Stewart, and Darius Rucker. Griffith referred to her backing band as the Blue Moon Orchestra.

== Early life ==
Griffith, the youngest of three siblings, was born in Seguin, Texas, and grew up in Rollingwood, a suburb of Austin, where her family moved shortly after her birth. Her mother Ruelene was a real estate agent and amateur actress; her father, Marlin Griffith, was a printer, publisher, graphic artist and barbershop quartet singer. Griffith began her music career at age 12, singing in a local coffeehouse. When she was a teenager, her father took her to see Townes Van Zandt. At 14, she performed her first professional gig at the Red Lion Cabaret in downtown Austin.

Griffith attended the University of Texas at Austin and received a degree in education. She taught kindergarten and first grade for a couple of years, before fully focusing on music.

== Career ==
=== Independent labels (1978–1986) ===
Her debut album, There's a Light Beyond These Woods, was released in 1978; the cover was designed by her father. Her second album, Poet in My Window, was released in 1982. Both albums were folk-oriented and released on small labels.

Griffith attracted attention of record producer Jim Rooney and recorded her third album, Once in a Very Blue Moon in 1984, in Nashville, with musicians such as Béla Fleck, Mark O'Connor and Lloyd Green. In the same year, she performed on PBS music program Austin City Limits. In the next year, with mostly the same musicians, she recorded the album The Last of the True Believers, which won her first Grammy nomination. The album included the songs "Love at the Five and Dime" and "Goin' Gone" which became hits for Kathy Mattea.

=== MCA years (1987–1991) ===
Griffith signed with MCA Records and moved to Nashville; her first album for MCA was the country-oriented Lone Star State of Mind, which included two songs, "Trouble in the Fields", co-written by Griffith, and "From a Distance", written by then unknown songwriter Julie Gold. These songs became popular in Ireland, and both have been covered by many singers. It was followed by Little Love Affairs, featuring "Outbound Plane" which later became a hit for Suzy Bogguss. In 1988, Griffith released One Fair Summer Evening, a live album recorded in Anderson Fair in Houston.

Griffith transferred to the MCA pop division and recorded Storms, which included a song she considered the most important she wrote, "It's a Hard Life Wherever You Go", about conflict in Northern Ireland and racism in the US.

In 1990, Griffith appeared on the Channel 4 program Town & Country with John Prine in a segment entitled "White Pants", where she wore white pants at the Bluebird Café in Nashville, Tennessee, along with Buddy Mondlock, Barry "Byrd" Burton, and Robert Earl Keen.

Griffith released Late Night Grande Hotel in 1991, and then left MCA Records.

=== Other Voices, Other Rooms and later works ===
In 1993, Griffith released the album Other Voices, Other Rooms, which won her first and only Grammy award. The album featured songs by various folk and country songwriters, and a large group of musicians, from Bob Dylan to Odetta. The album was certified gold by RIAA in 2005, more than a decade after it was released.

In 1994, she released the album Flyer, which received another Grammy nomination.

In the same year, Griffith teamed with Jimmy Webb to contribute the song "If These Old Walls Could Speak" to the AIDS benefit album Red Hot + Country produced by the Red Hot Organization. She survived breast cancer which was diagnosed in 1996, and thyroid cancer in 1998.

Christine Lavin, a singer and songwriter, remembers the first time she saw Griffith perform:

I was struck by how perfect everything was about her singing, her playing, her talking. I realized from the get-go that this was someone who was a complete professional. Obviously she had worked a long time to get to be that good.

In the late 1990s, Griffith wrote a letter to a number of Texas media, expressing her frustration with recent reviews.

Griffith contributed background vocals on many other recordings.

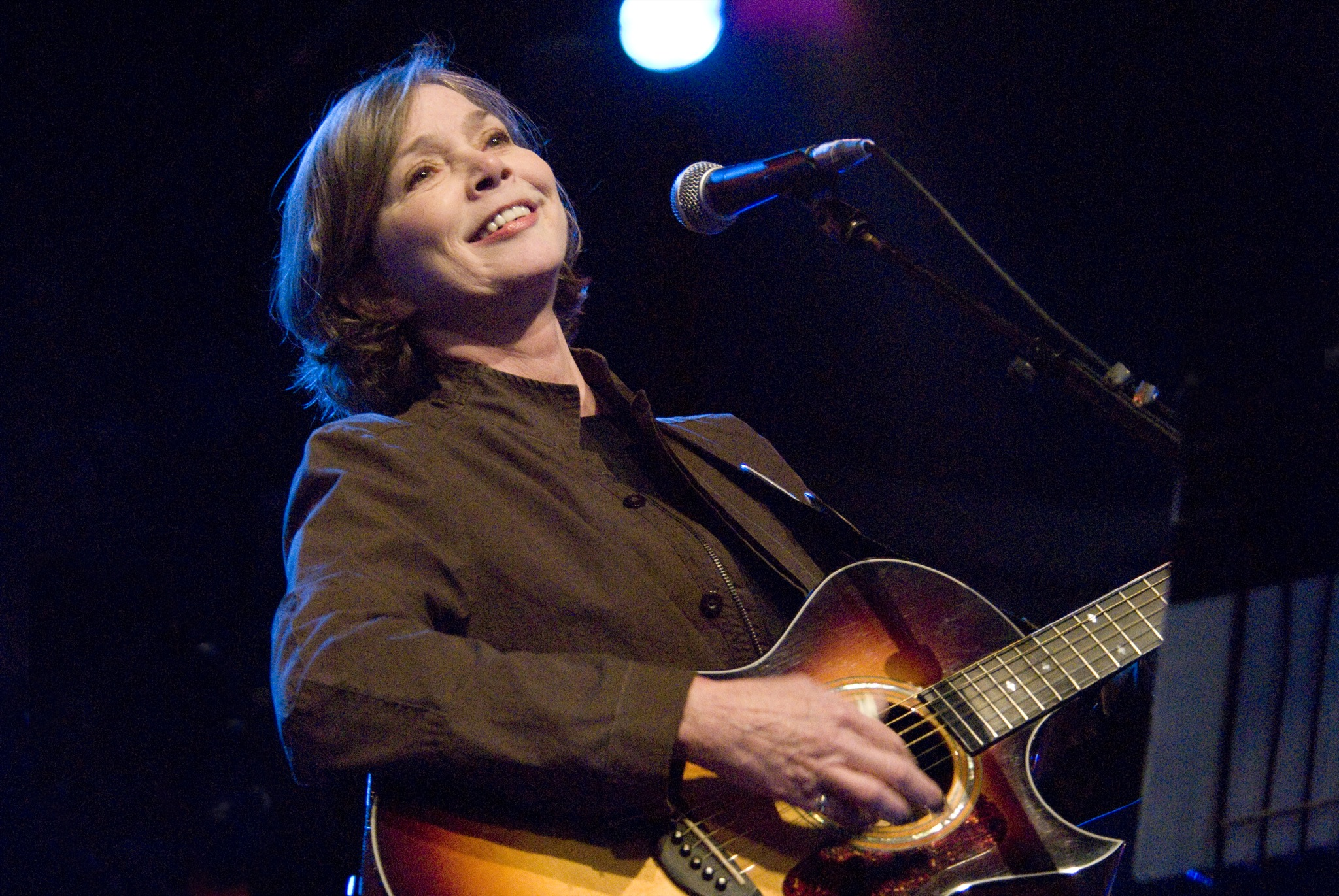
Griffith performing at the Cambridge Folk Festival, 2007

Griffith performed four songs, "The Day the Earth Stopped Cold", "Gravity of the Situation", "So Strange", and "Hold My Hand" with Hootie & the Blowfish during their MTV Unplugged performance in 1996 in Columbia, South Carolina, to raise awareness for Sweet Relief Musicians Fund.

Griffith suffered from severe writer's block after 2004, lasting until the 2009 release of the album The Loving Kind, which contained nine selections that she had written and composed either entirely by herself or as collaborations.

After several months of limited touring in 2011, Griffith's bandmates the Kennedys (Pete & Maura Kennedy) packed up their professional Manhattan recording studio and moved it to Nashville, installing it in Griffith's home. There with her backing group including the Kennedys and Pat McInerney, she co-produced her album Intersection over the summer. The album included several new original songs and was released in April 2012 on Proper Records. Her website lists live performances through 2013.

== Awards ==
Griffith won the 1994 Grammy Award for Best Contemporary Folk Album for Other Voices, Other Rooms. She was inducted into the Austin Music Hall of Fame in 1995. Griffith was awarded the Kate Wolf Memorial Award by the World Folk Music Association in 1995. In 2008, the Americana Music Association awarded her its Lifetime Americana Trailblazer Award. Lyle Lovett, who contributed backing vocals to her third album, Once in a Very Blue Moon, had won it before her. In 2010, Griffith received a Lifetime Achievement Award at BBC Radio 2 Folk Awards.

Griffith was posthumously inducted into the Texas Heritage Songwriters Association's Hall of Fame in February 2022 at the Paramount Theatre in Austin.

== The Blue Moon Orchestra ==
Griffith called her backing band the Blue Moon Orchestra. With regard to the chosen stage name, she wrote:

During the Christmas holidays of 1986, I organized a band of musicians to work this road of touring and to pass effortlessly through mine fields of studio sessions. They chose their name, the Blue Moon Orchestra, from my third album, Once in a Very Blue Moon. Some of them I had recorded and toured with prior to 1986: and some simply wandered into the Blue Moon Orchestra through this revolving open door of the road.

— Nanci Griffith in 1997

The title selection of the Once in a Very Blue Moon album reached number 85 on the Billboard Hot Country Songs chart in 1986. In 1986, Griffith showcased tracks from her Lone Star State of Mind album on The Nashville Network TV show, New Country.

Final members

- Nanci Griffith – lead vocals, guitar
- Pat McInerney – drums, percussion
- Maura Kennedy – vocals, guitar
- Pete Kennedy – guitar, vocals

Previous members

- James Hooker – piano, B-3, keyboards, vocals
- Byrd Burton – guitar
- Frank Christian – guitar
- Philip Donnelly – guitar
- Danny Flowers – guitar
- Clive Gregson – guitar, vocals
- Thomm Jutz – guitar, vocals
- Doug Lancio – electric guitar
- Lee Satterfield – vocals, rhythm guitar, mandolin
- Denny Bixby – bass, harmony vocals
- Ron De La Vega – bass, cello
- Le Ann Etheridge – vocals, bass guitar, rhythm guitar
- Pete Gordon – bass
- Pete Gorisch – bass, cello
- Danny Milliner – bass
- J. T. Thomas – bass, vocals
- Fran Breen – drums
- Liam Genockey – drums
- Steve Smith – drums

Guest backing vocalists

- Emmylou Harris
- Iris DeMent
- Lyle Lovett
- Denice Franke

== Personal life ==
Griffith's high-school boyfriend, John, died in a motorcycle accident shortly after taking her to the senior prom. He inspired many of her later songs. She was married to singer-songwriter Eric Taylor from 1976 to 1982. In the early 1990s, she was engaged to singer-songwriter Tom Kimmel.

Griffith was diagnosed with breast cancer in 1996, and thyroid cancer in 1998. Dupuytren's contracture led to her losing flexibility in her fingers, which made playing the guitar difficult.

== Political views and activism ==
Griffith was outspoken in her political views, supporting liberal, pacifist and left policies. She was "a total abolitionist on the death penalty" and wrote a song, "Not Innocent Enough", which appeared on her album The Loving Kind in 2009.

Her song "It's a Hard Life Wherever You Go" addressed the Troubles in Northern Ireland and racism in the United States.

Together with Emmylou Harris, Rodney Crowell and other artists, she was a member of Music Row Democrats, an organization promoting Democratic Party candidates in Nashville. She also supported Barack Obama and said, after he was elected: "the election [of Barack Obama] brought out the acceptance of hope and a new direction. When I went to Europe, I wasn't embarrassed about my country."

For years, Griffith wore buttons with political messages on her guitar strap, most often buttons from the Lyndon Johnson presidential campaign.

Griffith visited Vietnam, Cambodia, Kosovo and Angola in the 2000s, supporting Campaign for a Landmine Free World.

== Death ==
Griffith died in Nashville on August 13, 2021, at the age of 68. The exact cause of death was not reported but her management company attributed it to natural causes.

== Tribute albums ==
The first tribute album, Trouble In The Fields: An Artists' Tribute To Nanci Griffith was released by Paradiddle Records in 2012, including covers of Griffith's songs by the Kennedys, Jerry Jeff Walker, Tom Russell, Julie Gold, Red Molly, Carolyn Hester, John Stewart, Amy Rigby and others, mostly Griffith's collaborators and folk singers-songwriters.

On September 22, 2023, another tribute album, More than a Whisper: Celebrating the Music of Nanci Griffith, was released by Rounder and Concord Records. The compilation featured covers of Griffith's songs by her friends and fans, including Sarah Jarosz, John Prine, Kelsey Waldon, Billy Strings, Molly Tuttle, Emmylou Harris, Lyle Lovett, Kathy Mattea, Brandy Clark, Shawn Colvin, Ida Mae, Steve Earle, Aaron Lee Tasjan, Todd Snider, Iris DeMent, Mary Gauthier, and The War and Treaty.

== Discography ==
=== Studio albums ===
| Year | Album | Peak chart positions | | | Label |
| Year | Album | US Country | US | UK | Label |
|---|---|---|---|---|---|
| 1978 | There's a Light Beyond These Woods | — | — | — | B.F. Deal |
| 1982 | Poet in My Window | — | — | — | Featherbed |
| 1984 | Once in a Very Blue Moon | — | — | — | Philo |
| 1986 | The Last of the True Believers | — | — | — | Philo |
| 1987 | Lone Star State of Mind | 23 | — | — | MCA |
| 1988 | Little Love Affairs | 27 | — | 78 | MCA |
| 1989 | Storms | 42 | 99 | 38 | MCA |
| 1991 | Late Night Grande Hotel | — | 185 | 40 | MCA |
| 1993 | Other Voices, Other Rooms | — | 54 | 18 | Elektra |
| 1994 | Flyer | — | 48 | 20 | Elektra |
| 1997 | Blue Roses from the Moons | — | 119 | 64 | Elektra |
| 1998 | Other Voices, Too (A Trip Back to Bountiful) | — | 85 | — | Elektra |
| 1999 | The Dust Bowl Symphony | — | — | — | Elektra |
| 2001 | Clock Without Hands | — | 149 | 61 | Elektra |
| 2004 | Hearts in Mind | — | — | — | New Door |
| 2006 | Ruby's Torch | — | — | — | Rounder |
| 2009 | The Loving Kind | — | — | — | Rounder |
| 2012 | Intersection | — | — | — | Hell No |
"—" denotes releases that did not chart

=== Live albums ===
| Year | Album | Peak chart positions | Label |
| Year | Album | US Country | Label |
|---|---|---|---|
| 1988 | One Fair Summer Evening | 43 | MCA |
| 2002 | Winter Marquee | 45 | Rounder |

=== Compilation albums ===
| Year | Album | Peak positions | Label |
| Year | Album | UK | Label |
|---|---|---|---|
| 1993 | The MCA Years: A Retrospective | — | MCA |
| 1993 | The Best of Nanci Griffith | 27 | MCA |
| 1997 | Country Gold | — | MCA |
| 2000 | Wings to Fly and a Place To Be: An Introduction to Nanci Griffith | — | MCA |
| 2001 | 20th Century Masters – The Millennium Collection: The Best of Nanci Griffith | — | MCA |
| 2002 | From a Distance: The Very Best of Nanci Griffith | — | MCA |
| 2003 | The Complete MCA Studio Recordings | — | MCA |
| 2015 | Ghost in the Music (unofficial release) | --- | VOX ROX |
| 2023 | Working in Corners | --- | Craft Recordings |
"—" denotes releases that did not chart

=== Tribute albums ===
| Year | Album | Peak chart positions | Label |
| Year | Album | US Country | Label |
|---|---|---|---|
| 2012 | Trouble In The Fields: An Artists' Tribute To Nanci Griffith | -- | Paradiddle Records |
| 2023 | More than a Whisper: Celebrating the Music of Nanci Griffith | -- | Rounder and Concord Records |

=== Singles ===
| Year | Single | Peak chart positions | | | Album |
| Year | Single | US Country | CAN Country | Irish Singles Chart | Album |
|---|---|---|---|---|---|
| 1986 | "Once in a Very Blue Moon" | 85 | — | — | Once in a Very Blue Moon |
| 1987 | "Lone Star State of Mind" | 36 | — | — | Lone Star State of Mind |
| 1987 | "Trouble in the Fields" | 57 | 43 | — | Lone Star State of Mind |
| 1987 | "Cold Hearts/Closed Minds" | 64 | — | — | Lone Star State of Mind |
| 1987 | "Never Mind" | 58 | — | — | Little Love Affairs |
| 1988 | "From a Distance" | — | — | 9 | Lone Star State of Mind |
| 1988 | "I Knew Love" | 37 | — | 20 | Little Love Affairs |
| 1988 | "Anyone Can Be Somebody's Fool" | 64 | — | — | Little Love Affairs |
| 1989 | "It's a Hard Life Wherever You Go" | — | — | — | Storms |
| 1989 | "I Don't Wanna Talk About Love" | — | — | — | Storms |
| 1991 | "Late Night Grande Hotel" | — | — | — | Late Night Grande Hotel |
| 1993 | "Speed of the Sound of Loneliness" | — | — | — | Other Voices, Other Rooms |
| 1994 | "This Heart" | — | — | — | Flyer |
| 1995 | "Well...All Right" (with the Crickets) | — | 87 | — | Not Fade Away (Remembering Buddy Holly) |
| 1997 | "Maybe Tomorrow" | — | — | — | Blue Roses from the Moons |
| 1997 | "Gulf Coast Highway" | — | — | — | Blue Roses from the Moons |
| 1999 | "These Days in an Open Book" | — | — | — | Flyer |
"—" denotes releases that did not chart

== Videography ==
- Bob Dylan: The 30th Anniversary Concert Celebration Sony VHS (1993)
- Other Voices, Other Rooms Elektra Video VHS (1993)
- Winter Marquee Rounder/Universal DVD, Widescreen, (2002)
- One Fair Summer Evening...Plus! Universal Music & VI DVD, Fullscreen, (2005)

=== Music videos ===
| Year | Video | Director |
|---|---|---|
| 1988 | "I Knew Love" | Michael Salomon |
| 1989 | "It's a Hard Life Wherever You Go" | Willy Smax |
| 1991 | "Late Night Grande Hotel" | Sophie Muller |
| 1993 | "Speed of the Sound of Loneliness" (with John Prine) | Rocky Schenck |
| 1994 | "This Heart" | Rocky Schenck |
| 1996 | "Well...All Right" (with the Crickets) | |
| 2012 | "Hell No (I'm Not Alright)" | Stacie Huckeba |

== Bibliography ==
=== Non-fiction ===
| Title | Authors | Year of first publication | First edition publisher |
|---|---|---|---|
| Nanci Griffith's Other Voices: A Personal History of Folk Music | Nanci Griffith and Joe Jackson | 1998 | Three Rivers Press |

== See also ==
- Music of Austin
