= B.F. Deal Records =

US record label

B.F. Deal was a record label created by Austin, Texas, songwriter Michael Williams in the mid-1970s. It was an independent label which produced several local Austin artists at the time including Nanci Griffith's debut album, There's a Light Beyond These Woods released January 3, 1978.

Mike Williams also produced albums for Allen Damron, Austin musician and Kerrville Folk Festival aficionado.

B.F. Deal Publishing also produced a limited edition book titled Texas Genesis (1978). It was about the Texas progressive country music scene from 1963 through 1978. It was dictated into a tape recorder by Travis Holland and compiled by Michael Williams. Travis Holland was a musician that played with many, if not most, Texas progressive country artists during that time.

== Selected recordings ==
- Mike Williams, The Radio Show BFD1 1976
- Allen Wayne Damron, The Old Campaigner BFD2 1976
- Ladd, Lady Up The Stairs BFD3 1976
- B.F. Deal Sampler Vol. 1, BFD5 1977 included Nanci Griffith, John Garza, Frank Zigal and Will Walker.
- Mike Williams, Free Man Happy Man BFD6 1977
- Bill and Bonnie Hearne, Smilin' BFD7 1977
- Nanci Griffith, There's a Light Beyond These Woods BFD9 1978
- Tim Henderson, Waitin' For The Naked Girl To Call BFD8 1978
- Mike Williams, Comin' Atcha! BFD12 1979
