= The Loving Kind (Nanci Griffith album) =

Studio album by Nanci Griffith
- Released: June 9, 2009
- Recorded: November 2008 – March 2009
- Genres: Folk, country
- Label: Rounder
- Producers: Pat McInerney and Thomm Jutz

Nanci Griffith chronology
Ruby's Torch (2006)	The Loving Kind (2009)	Intersection (2012)

Professional ratings
Review scores
Source	Rating
AllMusic	3.5/5 stars
The Austin Chronicle	3.5/5 stars
BBC Music	(positive)
Billboard	(positive)
Exclaim!	(favorable)
PopMatters	6/10 stars
USA Today	3/4 stars

The Loving Kind is the 19th album by singer-songwriter Nanci Griffith. It was released June 9, 2009 as her last album for Rounder Records, a label for whom Griffith worked since 2002. Comprising thirteen songs (a fourteenth was released as a bonus track on iTunes), it was her first release of all new material since 2005. The album tackles political topics such as Loving vs. Virginia ("The Loving Kind") and capital punishment ("Not Innocent Enough"), as well as songs about Griffith's heroes, such as Townes Van Zandt ("Up Against the Rain"). BBC Music gave the album a generally positive review, stating that "It does sound like her muse is finally on the mend."

== Lyrics and inspiration ==
The lyrics in The Loving Kind are much more political than Griffith's previous work. The song The Loving Kind was written after Griffith read an obituary of Mildred Loving, the plaintiff in the 1967 U.S. Supreme Court case Loving v. Virginia that invalidated laws prohibiting interracial marriage.

"Money Changes Everything" and "Things I Don't Need" reflect the economic downturn that took place as the album was being written. "Up Against the Rain" and "Cotton's All We Got" were written about Townes Van Zandt and Lyndon B. Johnson, while "Not Innocent Enough" is about Phillip Workman, a man who was sentenced to death after the shooting of a police officer. "Across America" is about Barack Obama's campaign, while "Still Life" is a glaring criticism of George W. Bush. "Sing" is an autobiographical song about Griffith's love for Folk and country music.

== Reception ==
The album received mostly positive reviews. USA Today's Jerry Shriver gave the album 3 out of 4 stars, stating: "Wielding a clear, insistent voice and a soft acoustic guitar, the folkie star tackles a host of weighty topics, including interracial marriage, capital punishment and the second Bush era. But this is no tedious polemic: A crack backing group renders sweet country-inflected arrangements, and Griffith tosses in a couple of honky-tonkish weepers and a tender ode to Townes Van Zant [sic]."

== Track listing ==
1. "The Loving Kind"
2. "Money Changes Everything"
3. "One of These Days"
4. "Up Against the Rain"
5. "Cotton's All We Got"
6. "Not Innocent Enough"
7. "Across America"
8. "Party Girl"
9. "Sing"
10. "Things I Don't Need"
11. "Still Life"
12. "Tequila After Midnight"
13. "Pour Me a Drink"
14. "Love Is Love" (iTunes bonus track)

Out of the fourteen tracks on the album, nine were written by Griffith. "Money Changes Everything", "Party Girl", "Tequila After Midnight", and "Pour Me a Drink" are covers of other artists' work. "One of These Days" was written by Griffith for her The Last of the True Believers album in the 1980s.

== Charts ==
Chart (2009)	Peak position
UK Country Albums (Official Charts)	2
