= Clock Without Hands =

Studio album by Nanci Griffith
- Released: July 2001
- Recorded: December 2000 – April 2001
- Genre: Country
- Length: 49:04
- Label: Elektra
- Producers: Nanci Griffith, Ray Kennedy

Nanci Griffith chronology
20th Century Masters - The Millennium Collection: The Best Of Nanci Griffith (2001)	Clock Without Hands (2001)	From a Distance: The Very Best of Nanci Griffith (2002)

Professional ratings
Review scores
Source	Rating
AllMusic	2.5/5 stars
Entertainment Weekly	B+
Entertainment.ie	4/5 stars
No Depression	(positive)
People	(positive)
Q	3/5 stars
USA Today	3/4 stars

Clock Without Hands is Nanci Griffith's fourteenth studio album, released in July 2001. This was her last studio album that Griffith worked with Elektra Records. It was named after Carson McCullers's final novel. The album contains a particularly personal collection of songs, including "Last Song for Mother", a tribute to her mother. Vietnam is a recurring subject in several songs, including the biographical "Pearls Eye View (The Life of Dickey Chapelle)" for Dickey Chapelle, and "Traveling Through This Part of You" for her ex-husband, Eric Taylor, a Vietnam veteran. She also pays homage to one of her mentors John Stewart including three of his songs with Stewart playing guitar.

== Track listing ==
All tracks composed by Nanci Griffith except where indicated.

1. "Clock Without Hands" 3:43
2. "Traveling Through This Part of You" 4:03
3. "Where Would I Be" (Paul Carrack) 4:28
4. "Midnight in Missoula" 3:59
5. "Lost Him In the Sun" (John Stewart) 2:52
6. "The Ghost Inside of Me" (John Stewart) 3:04
7. "Truly Something Fine" (Griffith, James Hooker) 3:06
8. "Cotton" (James Hooker) 2:41
9. "Pearl's Eye View (The Life of Dickey Chapelle)" (Griffith, Maura Kennedy) 3:27
10. "Roses on The 4th of July" 3:36
11. "Shaking out the Snow" (Griffith, James Hooker) 4:45
12. "Armstrong" (John Stewart) 3:33
13. "Last Song for Mother" 2:40
14. "In the Wee Small Hours" (Bob Hilliard, David A. Mann) 2:50

== Personnel ==
- Nanci Griffith - vocals, acoustic guitar
- David Davidson - violin
- Ray Kennedy - acoustic guitar, Moog synthesizer
- John Catchings - cello
- David Angell - violin
- John Stewart - acoustic guitar
- Monisa Angell - viola
- James Hooker - keyboards
- Pete Kennedy - electric, 12-string, mando and baritone guitars
- Jim Williamson - baritone saxophone, trumpet, flugelhorn
- Pat McInerney - drums, percussion
- Michael "Mike Dee" Johnson - vocals, classical guitar
- Doug Lancio - electric guitar
- Lee Satterfield - classical guitar, backing vocals
- Clive Gregson
- Maura Kennedy
- Jennifer Kimball - backing vocals
- Chas Williams - acoustic, electric and slide guitars, resonator guitar
- Le Ann Etheridge - backing vocals
- Ron De La Vega - cello, bass
- String Machine - strings
- Michael Johnson - duet vocal "Roses on the 4th of July"

== Charts ==
Chart (2001)	Peak position
Scottish Albums (Official Charts)	48
UK Albums (Official Charts)	61
UK Country Albums (Official Charts)	5
US Billboard 200	149
