= Ruby's Torch =

Studio album by Nanci Griffith
- Released: November 14, 2006
- Recorded: April – August 2006
- Genres: Folk, country
- Length: 41:54
- Label: Rounder
- Producer: Peter Collins

Nanci Griffith chronology
Hearts in Mind (2004)	Ruby's Torch (2006)	The Loving Kind (2009)

Professional ratings
Review scores
Source	Rating
AllMusic	3.5/5 stars
The Austin Chronicle	2/5 stars
Manchester Evening News	5/5 stars
No Depression	(average)
Q	3/5 stars

Ruby's Torch is a 2006 Nanci Griffith album on Rounder Records. It is a collection of torch songs penned by Griffith and various other artists, including Tom Waits, Jimmy Webb and Donal MacDonagh Long. All the songs are produced with lush backing arrangements from a string orchestra.

== Track listing ==
1. "When I Dream" (Sandy Mason) 3:29
2. "If These Walls Could Speak" (Jimmy Webb) 3:40
3. "Ruby's Arms" (Tom Waits) 5:28
4. "Never Be the Sun" (Donal MacDonagh Long) 3:57
5. "Bluer Than Blue" (Charles Goodrum) 3:18
6. "Brave Companion of the Road" (Nanci Griffith) 3:29
7. "Grapefruit Moon" (Tom Waits) 4:20
8. "Please Call Me, Baby" (Tom Waits) 4:11
9. "Late Night Grand Hotel" (Nanci Griffith) 2:53
10. "In the Wee Small Hours of the Morning" (David Mann, Bob Hilliard) 2:51
11. "Drops from the Faucet" (Frank Christian) 4:07

== Personnel ==
- Larry Paxton - acoustic bass, electric guitar, acoustic guitar
- Michael Johnson - acoustic guitar
- Anthony La Marchina - cello
- John Catchings - cello
- Sari Reist - cello
- Kristin Wilkinson - conductor, violin
- Pat McInerney - drums, percussion
- Roger Weismeyer - oboe
- James Hooker - piano, organ
- Neil Rosengarden - trumpet
- Larry Paxton - tuba [sousaphone]
- David Davidson - viola
- Gary Vanosdale - viola
- Jim Grosjean - viola
- Conni Ellisor - violin
- David Angell - violin
- Mary Kathryn Vanosdale - violin
- Monisa Angell - violin
- Pamela Sixfin - violin

== Charts ==
Chart (2006)	Peak position
UK Country Albums (Official Charts)	2
UK Independent Albums (Official Charts)	21
