= The Kennedys (band) =

American folk-rock band

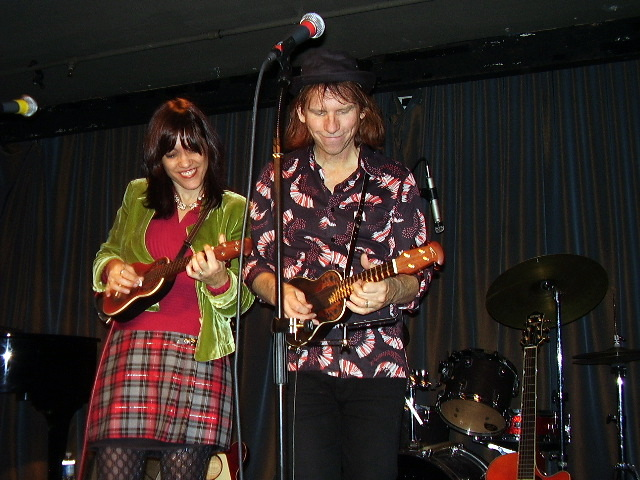

Background information
- Also known as: Pete and Maura Kennedy
- Origin: New York, U.S.
- Genres: Folk-pop
- Instruments: Vocals; guitar; electric sitar; ukulele
- Years active: 1994–present
- Labels: The Kennedys, LLC; Appleseed Recording; Varèse Sarabande; Rounder Records; Jiffyjam Records; Green Linnet; Philo
- Members: Pete Kennedy; Maura Kennedy
- Website: kennedysmusic.com

The Kennedys are an American folk-rock band, consisting of husband and wife Pete and Maura Kennedy. They are recognized for their harmonies and instrumental prowess, blending elements of country music, bluegrass, Western swing and jangle pop.

== Biography ==
Pete and Maura Kennedy met in Austin, Texas in 1992, when Pete was playing in Nanci Griffith's band. For their first date, they each drove 500 miles to meet at Buddy Holly's grave in Lubbock, Texas.

In June 1993, Maura Kennedy (née Boudreau) joined Griffith's band as a harmony singer, and Maura and Pete began their career as a duo when they opened for Griffith during her UK and Ireland tour.

Pete is from the Northern Virginia suburbs of Washington, D.C.; Maura grew up in Syracuse, New York. They lived for many years in the East Village in New York City, and in 2006 they joined other folk musicians living in Northampton, Massachusetts. They then returned to the East Village in 2008. They currently reside in Tarrytown, NY.

In the midst of the COVID-19 pandemic, and after losing concert engagements in 2020, the Kennedys started a weekly, all-request livestreaming show, beginning on Sunday, March 15, 2020, and running every Sunday. After the first several shows, they began including specialty shows, paying tribute to some of their favorite musical influences such as Bob Dylan, Buddy Holly, The Everly Brothers, John Lennon, Nanci Griffith, Patsy Cline, The Byrds, and a four-part Beatles mini-series. In addition, they have presented hours dedicated to specific genres, including the Summer of Love, a Beach Party, California Country Rock, British Invasion, and a Motown special.

=== Recordings ===
Their first album, River of Fallen Stars, was released under the name "Pete and Maura Kennedy"; they released all subsequent albums as "The Kennedys".

Their 1998 album Angel Fire featured many songs with literary references, such as "A Letter To Emily" and "Just Like Henry David".

=== Performing and touring ===
When performing live, Pete plays the acoustic and electric guitar, electric sitar, bass, mandolin, and ukulele, while Maura plays acoustic and electric guitars and ukulele.

They have performed in clubs and theatres throughout the United States, on a cruise, and at Bill Clinton's first and second inaugurations.

The Kennedys were awarded the Kate Wolf Memorial Award by the World Folk Music Association in 2001.

=== Other projects ===
In late 2006, Pete and Maura joined with Chris and Meredith Thompson to form The Strangelings, a folk-rock band prominently featuring Pete's electric sitar. Their first performance was on January 12, 2007. The music includes songs by both the Kennedys and the Thompsons in addition to traditional songs and covers. The full lineup of The Strangelings includes Pete, Maura, Chris Thompson, Eric Lee on fiddle, Cheryl Prashker on percussion, and Ken Anderson and Rebecca Hall, also known as Hungrytown.

=== Influences ===
Some of the Kennedys's influences include Nanci Griffith, Richard Thompson, Bob Dylan, Dave Carter, and Buddy Holly. They have toured with Griffith several times, and covered songs by Thompson, Dylan, and Carter.

== Discography ==
=== As the Kennedys ===
- 1995: River of Fallen Stars (Green Linnet)
- 1996: Life is Large (Green Linnet)
- 1998: Angel Fire (Philo)
- 2000: Evolver (Rounder)
- 2001: Positively Live! (JiffyJam)
- 2002: Get It Right (JiffyJam)
- 2003: Stand (Koch)
- 2005: Half a Million Miles (Appleseed)
- 2006: Songs of the Open Road (Appleseed)
- 2008: Better Dreams (Appleseed)
- 2012: Retrospective (The Kennedys, L.L.C.)
- 2012: Closer Than You Know (The Kennedys, L.L.C.)
- 2014: Dance A Little Closer: The Kennedys Sing The Songs Of Nanci Griffith (The Kennedys, L.L.C.)
- 2015: West (The Kennedys, L.L.C.)
- 2018: Safe Until Tomorrow (The Kennedys, L.L.C.)
- 2022: Soul & Inspiration: Nuggets From The Livestream Archive, Volume One (The Kennedys, L.L.C.)
- 2023: Headwinds (The Kennedys, L.L.C.)

=== As The Stringbusters ===
- 2007: Rhapsody in Uke (self-released) - an album of Hawaiian/swing/jazz music played largely on ukulele.

=== As The Snacks ===
- 2007: Meet the Snacks - An album of rock/pop for children

=== Pete Kennedy solo recordings ===
- 1985: Rhythm Ranch (Rooster Records RSTR-132) along with the booklet.
- 1985: Bound for Glory (Rosewood Records)
- 1991: Highway 10 (Third Floor)
- 1992: Channel 3 (Third Floor)
- 1992: Shearwater: The Art of the Unplugged Guitar (Third Floor)
- 1994: Shearwater: The Art of the Unplugged Guitar (Guitar Recordings)
- 2002: Fingers On Fire (Powerhouse) - Pete Kennedy and with Tom Principato recorded live in 1978
- 2008: Guitarslinger (The Kennedys LLC)
- 2014: Tone, Twang, and Taste (The Kennedys, L.L.C.)
- 2015: Heart of Gotham (The Kennedys LLC)
- 2017: Solo Guitar: Pete Kennedy Performs Top Hits of 1964 (Solo Sounds)
- 2017: Solo Ukulele: Pete Kennedy Performs Top Christmas Favorites (Solo Sounds)
- 2019: Solo Ukulele: Pete Kennedy Performs The Band's the Band (Solo Sounds)
- 2020: Solo Guitar: Pete Kennedy Performs John Legend's Get Lifted (Solo Sounds)
- 2020: Electric Sitar Meditations (The Kennedys LLC)

=== Maura Kennedy solo albums ===
- 2009: Parade of Echoes (Planned Effervescence)
- 2015: Villanelle-Songs of Maura Kennedy and BD Love (Varèse Sarabande)

=== With The Strangelings ===
- 2007: The Nuah Suite DVD (self-released)
- 2007: Season of the Witch (self-released via CD Baby)

=== As producers ===
- 2005: Bedsit Poets - The Summer That Changed (Bongo Beat)
- 2012: Nanci Griffith - Trouble in the Fields: An Artists' Tribute to Nanci Griffith (Paradiddle Records)
- 2012: Nanci Griffith - Intersection (Proper Records)

=== As primary artist/song contributor ===
- 1997: various artists - A Holiday Feast, Vol. 2 (Hungry For Music) - track 6, "Nothing But a Child"
- 1999: various artists - Main Stage Live: The Falcon Ridge Folk Festival Album (Signature Sounds) - track 2, "River of Fallen Stars"
- 2000: various artists - Full Circle: a Tribute to Gene Clark (Not Lame) - track 5, "Here Without You"
- 2001: various artists - Americana Motel (Bay Gumbo) - track 13, "Tell Me How"
- 2003: various artists - We Are Each Other's Angels (Hungry For Music) - track 1–18, "Angels Cry"
- 2005: various artists - Remembering Rachel: Songs of Rachel Bissex (Rachel Bissex via CD Baby) - track 13, "Hey Marianne"
- 2006: various artists - Five Way Street: A Tribute to Buffalo Springfield (Not Lame) - track 17, "Pretty Girl Why"
- 2006: various artists - A Case for Case: A Tribute to the Songs of Peter Case (Hungry For Music) - track 3–2, "Great Big World"
- 2007: various artists - Timeless Flyte, a Tribute to the Byrds: The Byrds Dylan Connection (REO) - track 7, "You Ain't Goin' Nowhere"
- 2012: various artists - Trouble in the Fields: An Artists Tribute to Nanci Griffith (Paradiddle) - track 3, "I'm Not Driving These Wheels"
- 2017: Solo Instrumentals: Top Hits of the Beatles (Pete Kennedy, one track (Solo Sounds)
- 2017: Solo Guitar: Post-Hipster Meditation Hits of the 20th Century (Pete Kennedy, two tracks) (Solo Sounds)
