= The Last of the True Believers =

Studio album by Nanci Griffith
- Released: 1986
- Recorded: October 7–9, 1985
- Studios: Cowboy Arms (Nashville, Tennessee)
- Genre: Country
- Length: 35:16
- Label: Philo
- Producers: Jim Rooney and Nanci Griffith

Nanci Griffith chronology
Once in a Very Blue Moon (1985)	The Last of the True Believers (1986)	Lone Star State of Mind (1987)

Professional ratings
Review scores
Source	Rating
AllMusic	4.5/5 stars
Robert Christgau	B−

The Last of the True Believers is the fourth studio album by American singer and songwriter Nanci Griffith, released in 1986 by Philo Records. The acclaim accorded her from her previous album, Once in a Very Blue Moon, and this album earned her a contract with a major recording company. Here, Griffith continued her turn toward a more country-oriented work than her first two albums, which were primarily folk-sounding. It also includes two songs which were later hits for Kathy Mattea, "Love at the Five and Dime" from Walk the Way the Wind Blows (1986) and "Goin' Gone", her first number one, from Untasted Honey (1987).

== Cover ==
The photograph on the album cover contains several references to the album's songs. A couple can be seen dancing behind Griffith standing in front of a Woolworth's store as described in "Love at the Five and Dime". The male dancer is Lyle Lovett, who also appears on the album as a vocalist. The man standing at far left is John T. Davis, at the time a music writer for the Austin American-Statesman.

As with many other Griffith albums, she is pictured holding books by and/or about southern writers. On the front cover, she is holding a copy of The Kindness of Strangers: The Life of Tennessee Williams by Donald Spoto. On the back cover, she is clutching Lonesome Dove by Larry McMurtry.

== Accolades and recognition ==
The album was included in the book 1001 Albums You Must Hear Before You Die.

It was nominated for the Grammy Award for Best Contemporary Folk Album at the 29th Annual Grammy Awards.

== Track listing ==
All tracks are written by Nanci Griffith except where noted otherwise.

No.	Title	Writer(s)	Length
1.	"The Last of the True Believers"		2:47
2.	"Love at the Five and Dime"		4:33
3.	"St. Olav's Gate"	Tom Russell	3:03
4.	"More Than a Whisper"	Griffith; Bobby Nelson	3:42
5.	"Banks of the Pontchartrain"		3:39
6.	"Lookin' for the Time (Workin' Girl)"		2:43
7.	"Goin' Gone"	Pat Alger; Bill Dale; Fred Koller	4:19
8.	"One of These Days"		2:54
9.	"Love's Found a Shoulder"		2:19
10.	"Fly by Night"		2:36
11.	"The Wing and the Wheel"		2:41

== Personnel ==
- Nanci Griffith – vocals, harmony vocals, acoustic guitar
- Philip Donnelly – electric guitar
- Pat Alger – acoustic and high-string guitar
- Rick West – acoustic guitar, mandolin
- Roy Huskey Jr. – double bass
- Ralph Vitello – piano
- Lloyd Green – dobro, pedal steel
- Béla Fleck – banjo
- Mark O'Connor – mandolin, violin, mandola
- John Catchings – cello
- Kenny Malone – drums, percussion
- Lyle Lovett – harmony vocals
- Pros and Cons Harmony Choir (Nanci Griffith, Marlin "Griff" Griffith, Richard Dobson, Robert Earl Keen, Lyle Lovett, Tom Russell) – harmony vocals on "St. Olav's Gate"
- Rachel Peer Prine – harmony vocals on "More Than a Whisper"
- Maura O'Connell – harmony vocals on "Banks of the Pontchartrain"
- Curtis Allen – harmony vocals on "Fly By Night"
- Gove Scrivenor – autoharp on "Goin' Gone"
- Robin Batteau – violin on "The Wing and The Wheel"

Track listing and personnel from the album's liner notes.
