= From a Distance =

1985 song written by Julie Gold

"From a Distance" is a song by American singer-songwriter Julie Gold, initially penned in 1985. Gold's friend Christine Lavin introduced the song to Nanci Griffith, who first recorded it for her 1987 album Lone Star State of Mind. A successful cover version by Bette Midler was released in 1990. Kathy Mattea released a cover of it on her 1991 album Time Passes By.

== Interpretation ==
Julie Gold has stated that she believes in an immanent and beneficent God, and also thinks that people have a right to interpret the song any way they want, as with all art. She has stated that the song is about the difference between how things appear to be and how they really are.

== Original Nanci Griffith version ==
"From a Distance"

Promotional single by Nanci Griffith

from the album Lone Star State of Mind
- Written: 1985
- Genre: Country
- Length: 4:10
- Label: MCA
- Songwriter: Julie Gold
- Producers: Tony Brown, Nanci Griffith

Nanci Griffith recorded it first in her 1987 album Lone Star State of Mind. Nanci Griffith stated that a songwriter Julie Gold sent her the song in 1986, asking Griffith what was wrong with it, as Gold had sent it to many artists and record companies but none wanted to record it. Griffith answered that she loved it so much the moment she heard it and that she wanted to hear it performed personally by Gold. This established a relationship between the two with Griffith being the first to record "From a Distance" in her Lone Star State of Mind album.

Griffith performed it live many times and a version of her live performance on August 19–20, 1988 at the Anderson Fair, a Houston, Texas club long known for featuring folk artists in an intimate setting, appeared in her live album One Fair Summer Evening.

The Griffith version charted only in Ireland, where her version became a sleeper hit, spending 17 non-consecutive weeks in the Irish Top 30 during 1988, peaking at number nine in April.

=== Track listing ===
- Irish 7-inch (MCA 1169)
1. "From a Distance"
2. "Sing One For Sister"

=== Charts ===
Chart (1988)	Peak position
Ireland (IRMA)	9

== Bette Midler version ==
"From a Distance"

Single by Bette Midler

from the album Some People's Lives
- B-side: "One More Round"
- Released: September 19, 1990
- Genre: Pop
- Length: 4:37
- Label: Atlantic
- Songwriter: Julie Gold
- Producer: Arif Mardin

Bette Midler singles chronology
"Wind Beneath My Wings" (1989)	"From a Distance" (1990)	"Night and Day" (1991)

Music video
- "From a Distance" on YouTube

"From a Distance" became an international commercial success after it was covered by American singer Bette Midler for her seventh studio album, Some People's Lives (1990). World events at this time gave the song a resonance as an anthem during the Gulf War. It reached number one on the US Billboard Adult Contemporary chart and number two on both the Cash Box Top 100 and Billboard Hot 100 charts. The song went on to win a Grammy for Song of the Year (for Julie Gold) in 1991 and a "3 Million Airs Award" from Broadcast Music Incorporated. The song also reached the top 10 in Australia, Canada, Ireland, and New Zealand. In the United Kingdom, the song peaked at number six following a re-release in 1991, having originally failed to make the top 40 when released concurrently with Cliff Richard's version.

Midler re-recorded a Christmas edition for her 2006 Christmas album, Cool Yule, with additional lyrics by Los Angeles native Jay Landers. Additional recordings of the original have been performed by Gold, Griffith, Simon Nicol (of Fairport Convention) and many others.

=== Critical reception ===
Larry Flick from Billboard magazine described "From a Distance" as a "soothing hymn that invokes inspirational images similar to 'Wind Beneath My Wings'", adding that the song "proves that the Divine Miss M still has what it takes to tackle top 40 territory." Hannsjörg Riemann from German Bravo gave Midler's version two out of three, viewing it as a "tearjerker". He added, "The scandal noodle of the US show scene has a great voice, as can also be seen here. Leisurely tempo, pleasant melody, medium strong arrangement." Alison Mayes from Calgary Herald named it a "sure-hit", saying that it "should have been done by Whitney Houston".

Dave Sholin from the Gavin Report felt the singer's Grammy for "Wind Beneath My Wings" "reaffirmed her innate ability to extract every single ounce of emotion out of a song. Teaming once again with producer Arif Mardin, she seems right at home with a tune that has much of the same quality as her giant hit of last year. Bette's certain to go the distance again." Gene Sandbloom from The Network Forty found that the lyrics "manage to take in the globe (with a minimum of sugar) and deliver a song worth listening to a hundred times. The music, produced by sound specialist Arif Mardin, is a slow crescendo made to support Midler's voice without overwhelming." He added that she "again uses her "no frills" vocal approach which makes this song so genuine."

=== Retrospective response ===
In a 2020 retrospective review, Matthew Hocter from Albumism stated that the song "showcases her magnificent vocality, coupled with lyrics entrenched in hope and peace." In August 2026, Billboard ranked it number 22 in their list of "The Biggest No. 2 Hot 100 Hits of All Time" list, noting that the song had peaked at number two, just behind Stevie B's "Because I Love You (The Postman Song)". Conversely, Midler's recording of the song ranked at number 37 on VH1's list of the "50 Most Awesomely Bad Songs Ever." and ranked at number 14 on Blender Magazine's list of "The 50 Worst Songs Ever". Criticisms focus on the song's lyrical content and the production of Midler's version.

=== Track listings ===
- US 7-inch and cassette single
- UK 7-inch and cassette single
- Japanese mini-CD single
1. "From a Distance" – 4:37
2. "One More Round" – 2:01
- UK 12-inch and CD single
1. "From a Distance"
2. "One More Round"
3. "Wind Beneath My Wings"
4. "The Rose"

=== Charts ===
==== Weekly charts ====
Original version

Chart (1990–1991)	Peak position
Australia (ARIA)	8
Canada Top Singles (RPM)	7
Canada Adult Contemporary (RPM)	1
Europe (Eurochart Hot 100)	14
Germany (GfK)	14
Ireland (IRMA)	3
Israel (Israeli Singles Chart)	20
Luxembourg (Radio Luxembourg)	14
Netherlands (Dutch Top 40)	33
Netherlands (Single Top 100)	33
New Zealand (Recorded Music NZ)	3
UK Singles (Official Charts)	6
UK Airplay (Music Week)	14
US Billboard Hot 100	2
US Adult Contemporary (Billboard)	1
US Cash Box Top 100	2

Christmas version

Chart (2007)	Peak position
Canada AC (Billboard)	26
US Adult Contemporary (Billboard)	13

==== Year-end charts ====
Chart (1990)	Position
Canada Top Singles (RPM)	61
Canada Adult Contemporary (RPM)	15

Chart (1991)	Position
Australia (ARIA)	51
Germany (Media Control)	63
UK Singles (OCC)	87
US Billboard Hot 100	15
US Adult Contemporary (Billboard)	25

=== Certifications ===
Region	Certification	Certified units/sales
Australia (ARIA)	Gold	35,000^{^}
United States (RIAA)	Platinum	1,000,000^{^}
^{^} Shipments figures based on certification alone.

=== Release history ===
Region	Date	Format(s)	Label(s)	Ref.
United States	September 19, 1990	7-inch vinyl; cassette	Atlantic	
United Kingdom	October 1, 1990	7-inch vinyl; 12-inch vinyl; CD; cassette	Atlantic	
Australia	October 15, 1990	7-inch vinyl; cassette	Atlantic	
Japan	October 25, 1990	Mini-CD	Atlantic	
Australia	November 19, 1990	CD	Atlantic	

== Cliff Richard version ==
"From a Distance"

Single by Cliff Richard

from the album From a Distance: The Event
- B-side: "Lindsay Jane II"
- Released: October 1, 1990
- Recorded: June 16–17, 1989
- Label: EMI
- Songwriters: Julie Gold, PF Sloan
- Producer: Cliff Richard

Cliff Richard singles chronology
"Silhouettes" (1990)	"From a Distance" (1990)	"Saviour's Day" (1990)

Music video
- "From a Distance" on YouTube

A cover by Cliff Richard released in October 1990 (very shortly after Midler's) served as the title track to his album From a Distance: The Event, which reached number 11 on the UK Singles Chart and number 16 in Ireland.

Richard opened his 1999 concert at Royal Albert Hall with the song.

=== Track listings ===
- UK 7-inch and picture disc single (EMI EM 155/EMI EMPD 155)
1. "From a Distance"
2. "Lindsay Jane II"
- UK CD and 12-inch single (EMI CDEM 155/EMI 12EM 155)
1. "From a Distance"
2. "Lindsay Jane II"
3. "Wired for Sound" (live)

=== Charts ===
Chart (1990)	Peak position
Europe (Eurochart Hot 100)	37
Ireland (IRMA)	16
Luxembourg (Radio Luxembourg)	8
UK Singles (Official Charts)	11

== Magdalene Survivors Together charity version ==
"From a Distance"

Single by Various artists
- Released: May 31, 2011
- Length: 4:05
- Songwriters: Julie Gold, PF Sloan
- Producers: John Reynolds, Tim Oliver

"From a Distance" became a 2011 charity single in support of Magdalene Survivors Together, a charity set up in July 2009 by Steven O'Riordan focusing on the human rights aspect of the Magdalene Laundries in Ireland. The 2011 single directed by O'Riordan had vocal participation from several artists: Sinéad O'Connor, Tommy Fleming, Brian Kennedy, Daniel O'Donnell, Ann Scott, Moya Brennan, Charlie Landsborough, Patrick Sheehy, Lumiere and the Scottish Glasgow Gospel Choir.

The track was produced by John Reynolds and Tim Oliver and mastered at Soundmasters, London. Tesco Ireland, Beaumex Ireland and Believe Digital distributed the single online and it was made available in Tesco stores through Ireland. The proceeds would go to build an Irish national monument for the Magdalene women.

== See also ==
- List of anti-war songs
- That Lucky Old Sun
- Ol' Man River
