= Late Night Grande Hotel =

Studio album by Nanci Griffith
- Released: September 1991
- Recorded: February – June 1991
- Genre: Country pop
- Length: 38:45
- Label: MCA
- Producers: Peter Van Hooke, Rod Argent

Nanci Griffith chronology
Storms (1989)	Late Night Grande Hotel (1991)	Other Voices, Other Rooms (1993)

Late Night Grande Hotel is the ninth studio album by American singer-songwriter Nanci Griffith. It was released in September 1991 by MCA Records. It was produced by Peter Van Hooke and Rod Argent, with a slightly more pop-oriented sound than previous albums. It also features vocal contributions from Phil Everly and Tanita Tikaram.

== Reception ==
Professional ratings
Review scores
Source	Rating
AllMusic	3.5/5 stars
Entertainment Weekly	B
Q	3/5 stars

Writing for AllMusic, critic Lindsay Planer wrote of the album "While not her best disc during the late '80s/early '90s, Late Night Grande Hotel is a solid effort with some of her most mature material to date."

== Track listing ==
All tracks are written by Nanci Griffith, except where indicated.

No.	Title	Writer(s)	Length
1.	"It's Just Another Morning Here"		4:23
2.	"Late Night Grande Hotel"		3:35
3.	"It's Too Late"		2:17
4.	"Fields of Summer"		4:19
5.	"Heaven"	Julie Gold	3:28
6.	"The Power Lines"	Nanci Griffith, Patrick Alger, James Hooker	2:38
7.	"Hometown Streets"	Nanci Griffith, James Hooker	4:11
8.	"Down 'N' Outer"		2:45
9.	"One Blade Shy of a Sharp Edge"		2:58
10.	"The Sun, Moon, and Stars"	Vince Bell	4:24
11.	"San Diego Serenade"	Tom Waits	3:27
Total length:			38:25

== Personnel ==
- Nanci Griffith – vocals, acoustic guitar
- Rod Argent – keyboards, synthesiser, string arrangements, vocal harmony
- Fran Breen – drums
- Barry Burton – electric guitar
- Byrd Burton – acoustic and electric guitars
- Mitch Dalton – classical guitar on "The Power Lines" and "Down 'N' Outer", slide guitar
- Mo Foster – bass on "Heaven", "The Power Lines" and "Down 'N' Outer"
- Peter Gorish – upright and electric basses, cello
- James Hooker – keyboards
- Pat McInerney – percussion
- Peter Van Hooke – drums and percussion

=== String section ===
- Violins: Mark Berrow, Ben Croft, Roger Garland, Roy Gillard, Wilfred Gibson, Tim Good, James McLeod, Peter Oxer, Jonathan Rees, Barry Wilde, David Woodcock
- Violas: Levine Andrade, David Emanuel, George Robertson, Robert Smissen
- Cellos: Paul Kegg, Helen Liebmann, Martin Loveday, Anthony Pleeth,

=== Guest vocalists ===
- Phil Everly – vocals on "It's Just Another Morning Here"
- Tanita Tikaram – vocals on "It's Too Late"

== Charts ==
Chart (1991)	Peak position
European Albums (Eurotipsheet)	99
UK Albums (Official Charts)	40
UK Country Albums (OCC)	1
US Billboard 200	185
