= One Fair Summer Evening =

Live album by Nanci Griffith
- Released: 1988
- Recorded: August 19–20, 1988
- Venues: Anderson Fair, Houston, Texas
- Genre: Country
- Length: 47:18
- Label: MCA
- Producers: Nanci Griffith, Tony Brown

Nanci Griffith chronology
Little Love Affairs (1988)	One Fair Summer Evening (1988)	Storms (1989)

Professional ratings
Review scores
Source	Rating
AllMusic	4.5/5 stars

One Fair Summer Evening was Nanci Griffith's seventh album, and her first one recorded in a live setting. It was recorded on August 19 and August 20, 1988, at Anderson Fair, a Houston, Texas club long known for featuring folk artists in an intimate setting.

Griffith mainly performed live versions of songs from her previously released albums, but added in a couple of new ones: "Deadwood, South Dakota" and "I Would Bring You Ireland". The album rose into the #43 position of the Billboard Country Albums chart.

== Critical reception ==
Jon Cummings of PopDose wrote, "Stripped of most of the country elements that had been ladled over their studio versions, Griffith’s songs emerge crisp and timeless; indeed, these live recordings accomplish the rare feat of rendering their studio antecedents obsolete."

AllMusic's Lindsay Planer retrospectively gave the album 4½ out of a possible 5 stars and began the review with, "This is singer/songwriter Nanci Griffith's first live album, and it captures the essence of what has endeared Griffith to fans of both folk and cosmopolitan country. Although One Fair Summer Evening was not an immediate phenomenon at the cash registers, the revealing nature of the performance has secured it a place in the hearts of enthusiasts since its release in 1988."

== Track listing ==
All tracks are written by Nanci Griffith, except where indicated.

No.	Title	Writer(s)	Length
1.	"Once in a Very Blue Moon"	Patrick Alger, Eugene Levine	2:53
2.	"Looking for the Time (Workin' Girl)"		2:52
3.	"Deadwood, South Dakota"	Eric Taylor	4:59
4.	"More Than a Whisper"	Nanci Griffith, Bobby Nelson	3:39
5.	"I Would Bring You Ireland"		3:21
6.	"Roseville Fair"	Bill Staines	3:32
7.	"Workin' in Corners"		3:58
8.	"Trouble in the Fields"	Nanci Griffith, Rick West	3:57
9.	"The Wing and the Wheel"		3:11
10.	"From a Distance"	Julie Gold	4:37
11.	"Love at the Five and Dime"		7:08
12.	"Spin on a Red Brick Floor"		3:11
Total length:			47:18

== Personnel ==
- Nanci Griffith - acoustic guitar, lead vocals
- Denny Bixby - bass guitar
- James Hooker - keyboards
- Doug Hudson - harmony vocals
- Denice Franke - harmony vocals
- Eric Taylor, James Hooker, Denny Bixby - harmony vocals on "Love at the Five and Dime"

== Production ==
- Producers - Nanci Griffith and Tony Brown
- Associate Producer - Buzz Stone
- Engineer - Phillip Barrett
- Assistant Engineer - Steve Lowney, Andy Vastola
- Second Engineers - Marty Williams, Mark J. Coddington
- Mastered by - Glenn Meadows
- CD Master Tape Prepared by - Glenn Meadows
- Digital Editing - Milan Bogdan
- Art Direction - Simon Levy
- Design - Virginia Team/Jerry Joyner
- Photography - Peter Nash

Track information and credits adapted from Discogs and AllMusic, then verified from the album's liner notes.

== Chart performance ==
Chart (1988)	Peak position
US Top Country Albums (Billboard)	43
