= Storms (Nanci Griffith album) =

Studio album by Nanci Griffith
- Released: August 8, 1989
- Recorded: January – May 1989
- Studios: Ocean Way, Nashville
- Genres: Country pop; folk-pop
- Length: 37:04
- Label: MCA
- Producer: Glyn Johns

Nanci Griffith chronology
One Fair Summer Evening (1988)	Storms (1989)	Late Night Grande Hotel (1991)

Professional ratings
Review scores
Source	Rating
AllMusic	3.5/5 stars
Robert Christgau	C+
Hi-Fi News & Record Review	A*:1

Storms was the eighth studio album released by singer-songwriter Nanci Griffith. When recording the album, Griffith chose to go in the direction of mainstream pop music. This was quite a musical change for her, as her previous albums had been folk and country music. Griffith enlisted the talents of noted rock music producer Glyn Johns for the musical style change.

The album landed at No. 42 on the Billboard Country Albums chart, and at No. 99 on the Pop Albums chart in 1989.

== Composition and music ==
The sixth track, "It's a Hard Life Wherever You Go" differs from the rest of the album, as an explicitly political song. The song was inspired by Griffith's visits to Northern Ireland.

The track "Listen to the Radio" is a tribute to singer-songwriter Loretta Lynn.

The last track on the album, "Radio Fragile", is about singer-songwriter Phil Ochs.

== Critical reception ==
Robert Christgau did not much care for the album. He gave it a C+ and remarked, "I don't know. But I expect she thinks it has something to do with art."

Mike Boehm, wrote in Los Angeles Times that in the song "It's a Hard Life Wherever You Go", "Griffith challenges what we have always been taught to believe: that America is the most principled of countries, the greatest force for global good. She ends the song by saying that a far different image--that of the Ugly American--is closer to fact."

Writing years later for AllMusic, critic Lindsay Planer noted that although her change in style was not well received by purists, Griffith "unfurled some of her finest musical stories to date".

== Track listing ==
All tracks are written by Nanci Griffith, unless otherwise noted.

No.	Title	Writer(s)	Length
1.	"I Don't Wanna Talk About Love"	Nanci Griffith; James Hooker	4:06
2.	"Drive-In Movies and Dashboard Lights"		3:11
3.	"You Made This Love a Teardrop"		3:05
4.	"Brave Companion of the Road"		3:16
5.	"Storms"	Eric Taylor	3:05
6.	"It's a Hard Life Wherever You Go"		3:59
7.	"If Wishes Were Changes"	Nanci Griffith; James Hooker	3:45
8.	"Listen to the Radio"		3:44
9.	"Leaving the Harbor"		3:26
10.	"Radio Fragile"	Nanci Griffith; James Hooker	5:27
Total length:			37:04

== Personnel ==
- Nanci Griffith – lead and harmony vocals, acoustic guitar
- James Hooker – piano, synthesizer
- Fran Breen – drums
- Bernie Leadon – acoustic slide guitar, mando-cello, electric guitar, harmony vocals (track 8)
- Pat Donaldson – electric bass, mando-cello
- Neil MacColl – electric guitar (tracks 1, 6, 10)
- Jerry Donahue – electric guitar (track 7)
- Mark Donahue – emulator III
- Phil Everly – supporting harmony vocals (track 3)
- Albert Lee – supporting harmony vocals (tracks 7, 8)

== Production ==
- Produced by Glyn Johns
- Recording Engineer – Jack Joseph Puig
- Recording Second Engineer – Joe Schiff
- Mixing Engineer – Glyn Johns
- Mising Assistant Engineer – Mike Rose
- Mastered by Doug Sax

Track information and credits adapted from the album's liner notes.

== Charts ==
Chart (1989)	Peak position
UK Albums (Official Charts)	38
UK Country Albums (OCC)	1
US Billboard 200	99
US Top Country Albums (Billboard)	42
