= Little Love Affairs =

Studio album by Nanci Griffith
- Released: 1988
- Recorded: August 1987
- Studios: Soundstage Studio, Nashville, Tennessee
- Genre: Country
- Length: 36:15
- Label: MCA
- Producers: Tony Brown, Nanci Griffith

Nanci Griffith chronology
Lone Star State of Mind (1987)	Little Love Affairs (1988)	One Fair Summer Evening (1988)

Little Love Affairs is Nanci Griffith's sixth studio album. It peaked at No. 27 on the Billboard Country Albums chart and topped the UK fortnightly country album chart for six weeks. It was also Griffith's first appearance on the main UK albums chart, where it reached No. 78. It spawned three charting singles on the Hot Country Singles chart, with "I Knew Love", "Never Mind", and "Anyone Can Be Somebody's Fool" reaching No. 37, No. 58, and No. 64 respectively.

The song "Outbound Plane" was later a hit for Suzy Bogguss, while "Gulf Coast Highway" was covered by numerous artists, including Emmylou Harris and Willie Nelson.

The album marks the beginning of Griffith's long association with keyboardist James Hooker, who would appear on every album until 2006.

== Critical reception ==
Professional ratings
Review scores
Source	Rating
AllMusic	3.5/5 stars
Chicago Tribune	(positive)
Robert Christgau	B+
Rolling Stone	4/5 stars

The album was met with positive reviews. Steve Pond in Rolling Stone wrote that "'Little Love Affairs' is an album of nostalgia for faded love, sung by a wounded optimist who is haunted by the little love affairs that didn't work out but stubbornly clings to her optimism" and "the fragility in Griffith's voice is extraordinarily well suited to the stories she's telling."

William Ruhlmann of AllMusic wrote retrospectively that the album "was the crucial release in her attempt to achieve success as a Nashville-based country artist, and in that context it was a failure. But it was also an artistic success, containing 11 well-written and well-performed songs."

Mark Cooper in Q magazine described Griffith's voice as "an appealing mixture of wide-eyed innocence and tough-minded resolve".

== Track listing ==
=== Side one ===
1. "Anyone Can Be Somebody's Fool" (Nanci Griffith) – 2:39
2. "I Knew Love" (Roger Brown) – 3:17
3. "Never Mind" (Harlan Howard) – 3:42
4. "Love Wore a Halo (Back Before the War)" (Griffith) – 3:23
5. "So Long Ago" (Griffith) – 4:10
6. "Gulf Coast Highway" duet with Mac McAnally (James Hooker, Griffith, Danny Flowers) – 3:06

=== Side two ===
1. "Little Love Affairs" (Griffith, Hooker) – 3:08
2. "I Wish It Would Rain" (Griffith) – 2:38
3. "Outbound Plane" (Griffith, Tom Russell) – 2:39
4. "I Would Change My Life" (Robert Earl Keen, Jr) – 3:08
5. "Sweet Dreams Will Come" duet with John Stewart (John Stewart) – 4:25

== Personnel ==
- Nanci Griffith - acoustic guitar, lead vocals, backing vocals
- Charlie Bundy- backing vocals
- Sam Bush - mandolin
- John Catchings - cello
- Béla Fleck - banjo
- Dan Flowers - slide guitar, backing vocals
- Pat Flynn - acoustic guitar
- Jon Goin - classical guitar, electric guitar. hi-string guitar
- Lloyd Green - dobro, piano
- James Hooker - piano, synthesizer
- David Hungate - bass guitar
- Roy Huskey Jr. - upright bass
- Lucy Kaplansky - backing vocals
- Mac McAnally - gut-string guitar and duet vocals on "Gulf Coast Highway"
- Rick Marotta - drums
- Mark O'Connor - mandolin, viola, violin
- John Stewart - electric guitar and duet vocals on "Sweet Dreams Will Come"
- Billy Joe Walker Jr. - acoustic guitar

== Chart performance ==
Chart (1988)	Peak position
UK Albums (OCC)	78
UK Country Albums (OCC)	1
US Top Country Albums (Billboard)	27
