= Lone Star State of Mind =

Studio album by Nanci Griffith
- Released: 1987
- Recorded: July 1986
- Studios: Soundstage/The Back Stage Studios, Nashville, Tennessee
- Genre: Country
- Length: 35:38
- Label: MCA
- Producers: Tony Brown, Nanci Griffith

Nanci Griffith chronology
The Last of the True Believers (1986)	Lone Star State of Mind (1987)	Little Love Affairs (1988)

Professional ratings
Review scores
Source	Rating
AllMusic	4/5 stars
Robert Christgau	B

Lone Star State of Mind is the fifth studio album released by American musician Nanci Griffith, and her first album for MCA Records. With the album, Griffith's music took a turn from her original folk music base into more commercially viable country music. For this album, she enlisted the talents of veteran country producer Tony Brown. The album garnered her first appearance on the Billboard Country charts, rising to No. 23 on the Country Albums chart, and was her highest-charting album on the chart. It was also a massive success in the United Kingdom, where it topped the country albums chart and spent over a year in the top 20. The title track, "Lone Star State of Mind," became the first of only three Griffith singles to enter the Top 40 of the Billboard Hot Country Singles chart. It peaked at No. 36, while two other singles from the album, "Cold Hearts/Closed Minds" and "Trouble in the Fields", reached No. 64 and No. 57 respectively. The song "From a Distance" would go on to become a major pop hit when covered by Bette Midler in 1990.

== Critical reception ==
This album was given a mark of "B" by Robert Christgau in his review. He wrote, "Band's the same, and there's not a whole hell of a lot of distance between Jim Rooney, a marketwise old folk pro, and Tony Brown" and concludes with, "Too often, though, she's still a folkie playing just folks."

Thom Owens of AllMusic wrote retrospectively of the album, "Lone Star State of Mind was Nanci Griffith's commercial breakthrough, largely because it was her first step directly toward mainstream contemporary country."

== Dedication to Rosalie Sorrels ==
The song "Ford Econoline" was a fictional tale dedicated to folk singer Rosalie Sorrels. In the song, Griffith describes Sorrels escaping an unhappy Mormon marriage, driving from Salt Lake City to San Diego with her five children to start a new life as a folk singer. Sorrels and her husband were not Mormon but Sorrels certainly did drive her children around the US in a Ford Econoline passenger van as she toured and sang. The "rollicking" song was not released as a single, but it was performed frequently by Griffith in concert, including a standout appearance backed by the Chieftains and Roger Daltrey in Belfast in 1991, part of the finale sequence on the live album An Irish Evening.

== Track listing ==
All tracks are written by Nanci Griffith, except as indicated.

No.	Title	Writer(s)	Length
1.	"Lone Star State of Mind"	Fred Koller, Patrick Alger, Gene Levine	3:56
2.	"Cold Hearts/Closed Minds"		2:40
3.	"From a Distance"	Julie Gold	4:10
4.	"Beacon Street"		2:49
5.	"Nickel Dreams"	Mac McAnally, Don Lowery	2:48
6.	"Sing One for Sister"	Robert Earl Keen, Jr.	3:20
7.	"Ford Econoline"		2:10
8.	"Trouble in the Fields"	Griffith, Rick West	3:18
9.	"Love in a Memory"		3:17
10.	"Let It Shine on Me"	Paul Kennerley	2:59
11.	"There's a Light Beyond These Woods (Mary Margaret)"		4:21
Total length:			35:38

== Personnel ==
- Nanci Griffith - acoustic guitar, harmony vocals
- Pat Alger - acoustic lead guitar, hi-string guitar
- John Catchings - cello
- Philip Donnelly - acoustic guitar, electric guitar
- Béla Fleck - banjo
- Emory Gordy Jr. - electric bass and mandolin on "Sing One for Sister"
- Lloyd Green - dobro, pedal steel
- Roy Huskey Jr. - upright bass on "Sing One for Sister"
- John Barlow Jarvis - piano
- Lucy Kaplansky - harmony vocals
- Russ Kunkel - drums, percussion
- Mac McAnally - acoustic guitar, harmony vocals
- Mark O'Connor - fiddle, mandolin, mandola, viola, violin, acoustic guitar on "From a Distance"
- Rick West - acoustic lead guitar on "There's a Light Beyond These Woods" and "Trouble in the Fields"

== Production ==
- Producer - Tony Brown
- Producer - Nanci Griffith
- Recorder and Mixer - Steve Tillisch
- Second Engineers - Mark J. Coddington, Tim Kish, Russ Marting, Marty Williams
- Project Coordinator - Jessie Noble
- CD Art Direction - Simon Levy
- CD Design - Camille Engel Advertising
- CD Coordinator - Katie Gillon, Sherri Halford
- Photography - McGuire

Track information and credits adapted from the album's liner notes.

== Chart performance ==
Chart (1987)	Peak position
U.K. Country Albums	1
US Top Country Albums (Billboard)	23
