= Eric Taylor (musician) =

American musician (1949–2020)

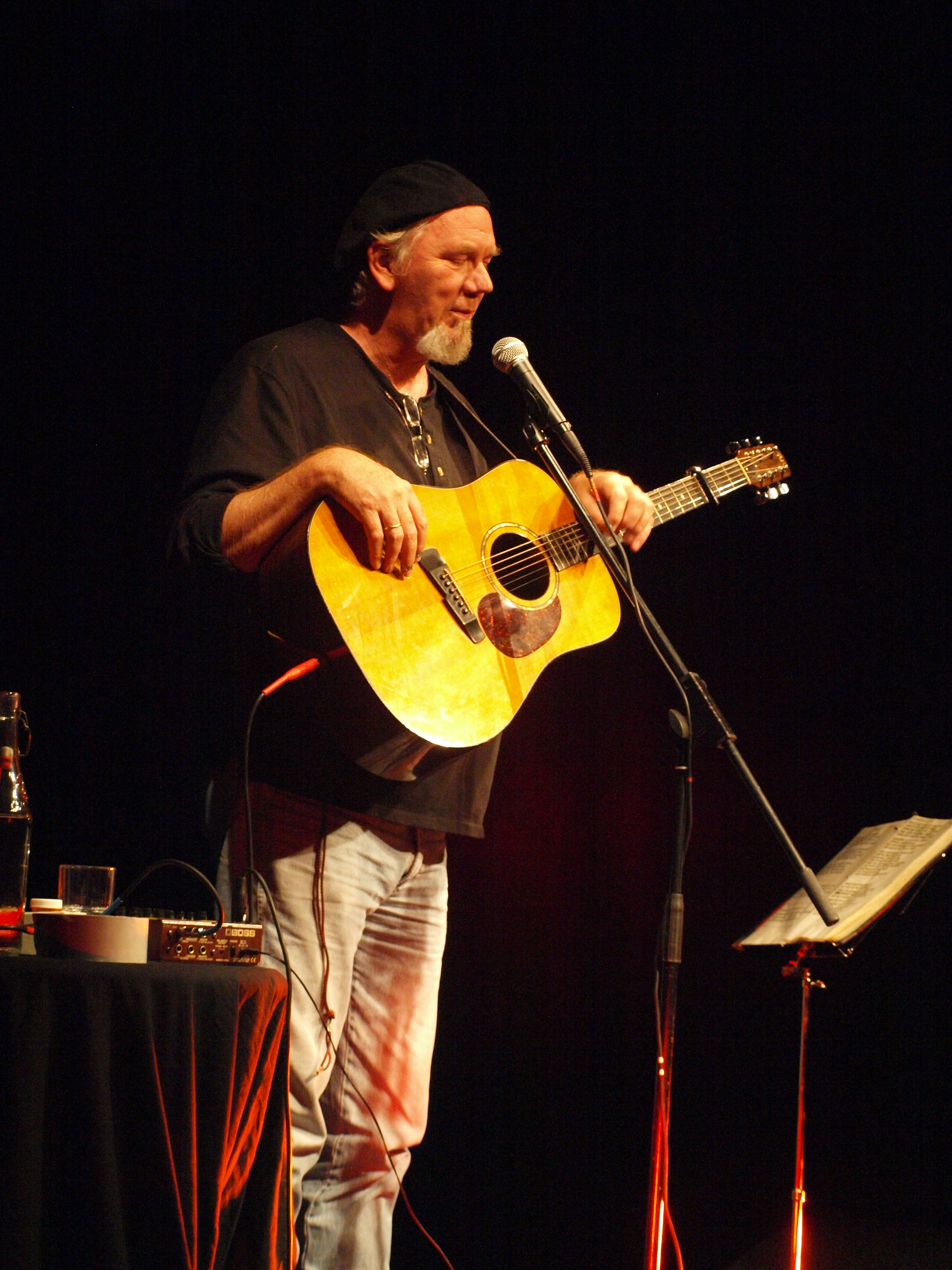
- Taylor performing in Wexford, Ireland by Sean Rowe

Background information
- Born: September 25, 1949; Atlanta, Georgia, U.S.
- Died: March 9, 2020 (aged 70) Austin, Texas, U.S.
- Genres: Americana folk blues
- Occupations: Musician songwriter
- Instruments: Vocals guitar
- Labels: Blue Ruby Records; Eminent Records; E1 Music; Watermelon
- Website: Bluerubymusic.com

Eric Taylor (September 25, 1949 – March 9, 2020) was an American singer-songwriter from Texas, known for his storytelling style, combining spoken words with anecdotal songs to create a theater-style performance. In addition to Taylor's nine solo releases, his songs have been recorded by Nanci Griffith, Lyle Lovett, Peter Cooper, and others.

== Early life ==
Taylor was born in Atlanta, Georgia. He began playing guitar as a child and performed in a racially-integrated soul music band in high school. He briefly attended Georgetown University before dropping out and moving to Houston to pursue a career in music.

== Career ==
Taylor toured extensively in the United States and Europe, playing notable venues such as Club Passim, The Bottom Line, Caffe Lena, Bluebird Café, Red Clay Theatre, Bridger Folk, The Ark, CSPS, The Freight and Salvage, Paradiso (Amsterdam), Theatre Kikker (Utrecht), Berlin Guitars (Berlin), The Real Music Club (Belfast), DC Music Club (Dublin), Hotel du Nord (Paris) and The Bein Inn (Perth). Festival appearances include Kerrville Folk Festival, Newport Folk Festival, Glasgow Americana Festival (Scotland), Woody Guthrie Folk Festival, 1st Americana Fest (Austria), Take Root Festival (The Netherlands), and Roots of Heaven Festival (The Netherlands). He taught at the Kerrville Song School, and conducted songwriting workshops throughout the United States and in Europe. Taylor was married to singer-songwriter Nanci Griffith from 1976 to 1982.

In 2009, Lovett released Natural Forces, his second album of covered songs, and again included a Taylor song. This time it was "Whooping Crane," from Taylor's 1995 self-titled album. Lovett's 2012 Release Me album, also has one of Taylor's songs "Understand You."

Taylor's last release was Studio 10 in 2013, recorded at the Red Shack Studio in Houston and features nine original songs and a cover of Tim Grimm's "Cover These Bones." In 2016, Taylor was nominated for an Emmy Award for Musical Composition for songs he wrote for the Storyworks television documentary, Road Kid to Writer: The Tracks of Jim Tully.

Taylor died on March 9, 2020, at the age of 70 from liver disease.

== Discography ==
- Through The Dark Nightly (1976) – [Fair Retail Records, compilation with other Houston songwriters: Bill Cade, Stephen Jarrard, Lynn Langman, Don Sanders]
- Shameless Love (1981, Featherbed; reissued 2004, Blue Ruby Music)
- Eric Taylor (1995, Watermelon)
- Resurrect (1998, E1 Music)
- Scuffletown (2001, Eminent Records)
- The Kerrville Tapes (2003, Silverwolf)
- The Great Divide (2005, Blue Ruby Music)
- Hollywood Pocketknife (2007, Blue Ruby Music)
- Live at the Red Shack (2011, Blue Ruby Music)
- Studio 10 (2013, Blue Ruby Music)
