= Kathy Mattea discography =

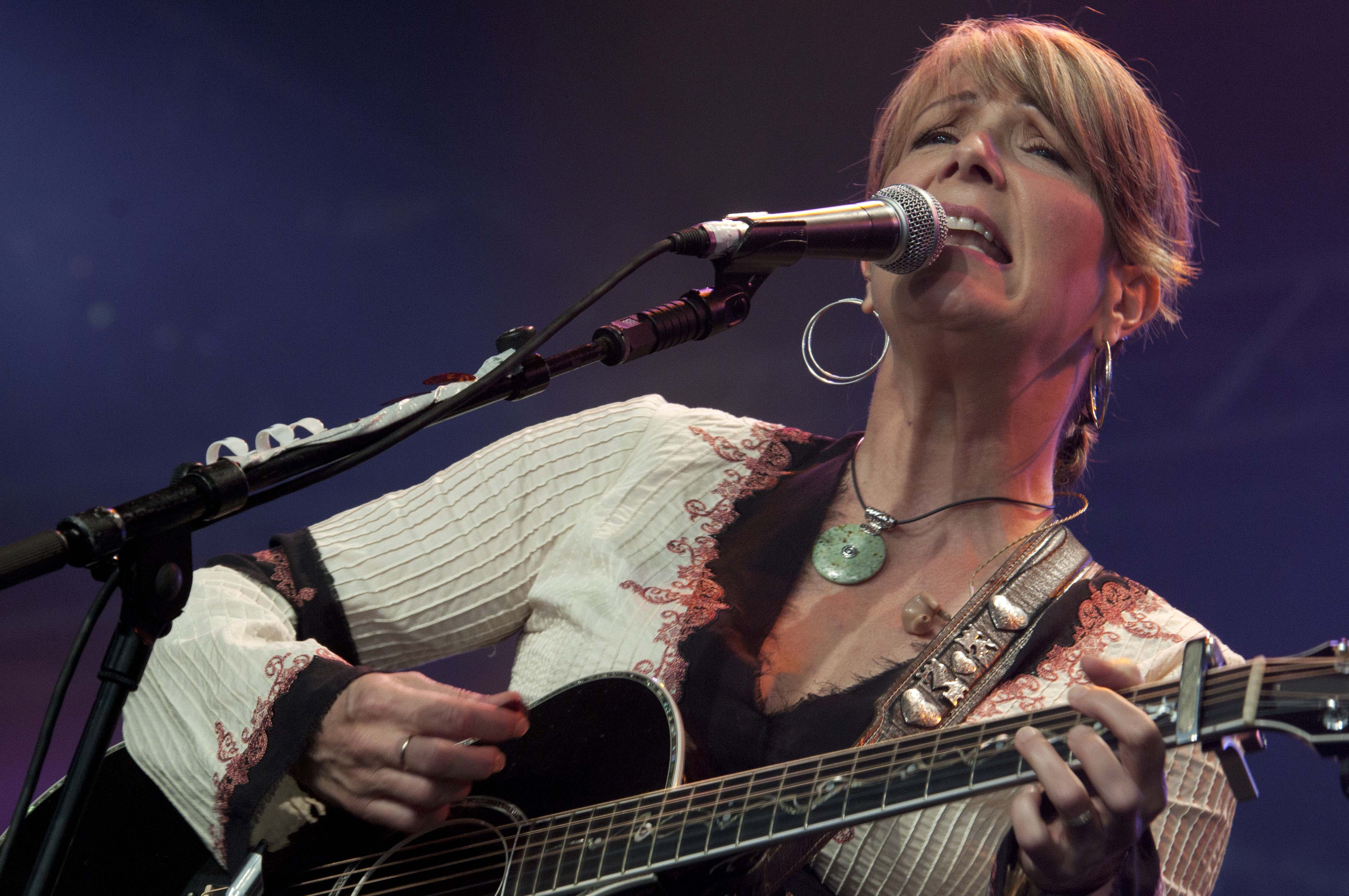
- Mattea performing at the Cambridge Folk Festival, 2010.
- Studio albums: 17
- Extended plays: 1
- Compilation albums: 4
- Singles: 51
- Video albums: 5
- Music videos: 27
- Other album appearances: 19

The discography of American country music artist, Kathy Mattea, contains 17 studio albums, four compilation albums, five video albums, one extended play (EP), 51 singles, 27 music videos and has made 19 additional album appearances. Under PolyGram and Mercury Records, Mattea's first two albums were releases: her eponymous debut album (1984) and From My Heart (1985). In 1986, Walk the Way the Wind Blows reached number 13 on America's Billboard Top Country Albums chart and spawned four top ten Billboard Hot Country Songs singles: "Love at the Five and Dime", the title track, "You're the Power" and "Train of Memories". It was followed by Untasted Honey (1987), which was Mattea's first album to certify gold in the United States. Of its four singles, "Eighteen Wheels and a Dozen Roses" and "Goin' Gone" both topped the Billboard country chart. In 1989, PolyGram/Mercury released Willow in the Wind, which also certified gold and reached number six on the Billboard country albums chart. Its first single, "Come from the Heart", topped both the American and Canadian country charts. Its remaining three singles were also top ten North American country chart songs: "Burnin' Old Memories", "Where've You Been" and "She Came from Fort Worth".

Mattea's first compilation was issued in 1990 titled A Collection of Hits, which later certified platinum in the United States. Both of its new recordings were released as singles and reached the country chart top ten: "The Battle Hymn of Love" and "A Few Good Things Remain". In 1991, Time Passes By was released. It reached number nine on the Billboard country chart and was her third gold-certified release. Its title track reached number seven on the North American country charts. Her seventh studio album was released in 1992, Lonesome Standard Time, which also certified gold in the United States. Her 1994 album, Walking Away a Winner, brought Mattea her highest-charting single in several years, along with two additional top 20 singles.

PolyGram/Mercury released two more of Mattea's albums: Love Travels (1997) and The Innocent Years (2000). The latter featured her last charting singles to date. On the Narada label, Mattea released three studio albums including 2003's Joy for Christmas Day. In 2008, she issued her next studio release titled Coal. While reaching the country albums chart, it also became her first album to chart (and top) the Billboard Top Bluegrass Albums chart. On Sugar Hill Records, Mattea's sixteenth studio album was released: Calling Me Home. The album similarly charted on both the Billboard country and bluegrass album charts, reaching number two on the latter. Mattea's most recent album was 2018's Pretty Bird, along with new single releases.

== Albums ==
=== Studio albums ===
List of albums, with selected chart positions and certifications, showing other relevant details
Title	Album details	Peak chart positions						Certifications
Title	Album details	US	US Cou.	US Blu.	US Fol.	CAN Cou.	UK	Certifications
Kathy Mattea	Released: March 22, 1984; Label: Mercury/PolyGram; Formats: LP, CD, cassette	—	42	—	—	—	—	
From My Heart	Released: March 3, 1985; Label: Mercury/PolyGram; Formats: LP, CD, cassette	—	42	—	—	—	—	
Walk the Way the Wind Blows	Released: March 20, 1986; Label: Mercury/PolyGram; Formats: LP, CD, cassette	—	13	—	—	—	—	
Untasted Honey	Released: September 28, 1987; Label: Mercury/PolyGram; Formats: LP, CD, cassette	—	11	—	—	—	—	RIAA: Gold
Willow in the Wind	Released: April 4, 1989; Label: Mercury/PolyGram; Formats: LP, CD, cassette	82	6	—	—	28	—	RIAA: Gold
Time Passes By	Released: March 19, 1991; Label: Mercury/PolyGram; Formats: LP, CD, cassette	72	9	—	—	—	—	RIAA: Gold
Lonesome Standard Time	Released: September 22, 1992; Label: Mercury/PolyGram; Formats: CD, cassette	182	41	—	—	—	—	RIAA: Gold
Good News	Released: September 21, 1993; Label: Mercury/PolyGram; Formats: CD, cassette	—	51	—	—	—	—	
Walking Away a Winner	Released: May 17, 1994; Label: Mercury/PolyGram; Formats: CD, cassette	87	12	—	—	—	—	RIAA: Gold
Love Travels	Released: February 4, 1997; Label: Mercury; Formats: CD, cassette	121	15	—	—	—	65	
The Innocent Years	Released: May 16, 2000; Label: Mercury; Formats: CD, cassette	—	35	—	—	—	—	
Roses	Released: July 30, 2002; Label: Narada; Formats: CD	—	38	—	—	—	—	
Joy for Christmas Day	Released: September 30, 2003; Label: Narada; Formats: CD	—	69	—	—	—	—	
Right Out of Nowhere	Released: September 27, 2005; Label: Narada; Formats: CD	—	73	—	—	—	—	
Coal	Released: April 1, 2008; Label: Captain Potato/Thirty Tigers; Formats: CD, music download	—	64	1	—	—	—	
Calling Me Home	Released: September 11, 2012; Label: Sugar Hill; Formats: CD, music download	—	54	2	21	—	—	
Pretty Bird	Released: September 7, 2018; Label: Captain Potato/Thirty Tigers; Formats: CD, music download	—	—	—	—	—	—	
"—" denotes a recording that did not chart or was not released in that territory.

=== Compilation albums ===
List of albums, with selected chart positions and certifications, showing other relevant details
Title	Album details	Peak chart positions			Certifications
Title	Album details	US	US Cou.	UK	Certifications
A Collection of Hits	Released: August 7, 1990; Label: Mercury/PolyGram; Formats: LP, CD, cassette	80	8	—	MC: Gold; RIAA: Platinum
Ready for the Storm	Released: 1995; Label: Mercury; Formats: CD	—	—	61	
The Definitive Collection	Released: August 29, 2006; Label: Mercury; Formats: CD	—	—	—	
"—" denotes a recording that did not chart or was not released in that territory.

== Extended plays ==
List of extended plays (EPs), showing all relevant details
Title	Album details
Go Tell It on the Mountain	Released: 2014; Label: Self-released; Formats: CD

== Singles ==
=== As lead artist ===
List of singles, with selected chart positions, showing other relevant details
Title	Year	Peak chart positions			Album
Title	Year	US Cou.	US AC	CAN Cou.	Album
"Street Talk"	1983	25	—	—	Kathy Mattea
"Someone Is Falling in Love"	1984	26	23	—	Kathy Mattea
"You've Got a Soft Place to Fall"	1984	44	—	—	Kathy Mattea
"That's Easy for You to Say"	1984	50	—	—	Kathy Mattea
"God Ain't No Stained Glass Window"	1984	—	—	—	Kathy Mattea
"It's Your Reputation Talkin'"	1985	34	—	—	From My Heart
"He Won't Give In"	1985	22	—	—	From My Heart
"Heart of the Country"	1985	46	—	—	From My Heart
"Love at the Five and Dime"	1986	3	—	—	Walk the Way the Wind Blows
"Walk the Way the Wind Blows"	1986	10	—	—	Walk the Way the Wind Blows
"You're the Power"	1986	5	—	—	Walk the Way the Wind Blows
"Train of Memories"	1987	6	—	15	Walk the Way the Wind Blows
"Goin' Gone"	1987	1	—	3	Untasted Honey
"Eighteen Wheels and a Dozen Roses"	1988	1	—	1	Untasted Honey
"Untold Stories"	1988	4	—	13	Untasted Honey
"Life as We Knew It"	1988	4	—	—	Untasted Honey
"Come from the Heart"	1989	1	—	1	Willow in the Wind
"Burnin' Old Memories"	1989	1	—	4	Willow in the Wind
"Where've You Been"	1989	10	25	13	Willow in the Wind
"She Came from Fort Worth"	1990	2	—	13	Willow in the Wind
"The Battle Hymn of Love" (with Tim O'Brien)	1990	9	—	10	A Collection of Hits
"A Few Good Things Remain"	1990	9	—	7	A Collection of Hits
"Time Passes By"	1991	7	—	7	Time Passes By
"Whole Lotta Holes"	1991	18	—	12	Time Passes By
"Asking Us to Dance"	1991	27	—	65	Time Passes By
"Lonesome Standard Time"	1992	11	—	14	Lonesome Standard Time
"Standing Knee Deep in a River (Dying of Thirst)"	1993	19	—	24	Lonesome Standard Time
"Seeds"	1993	50	—	34	Lonesome Standard Time
"Listen to the Radio"	1993	64	—	—	Lonesome Standard Time
"Walking Away a Winner"	1994	3	—	16	Walking Away a Winner
"Nobody's Gonna Rain on Our Parade"	1994	13	—	8	Walking Away a Winner
"Maybe She's Human"	1994	34	—	36	Walking Away a Winner
"Clown in Your Rodeo"	1995	20	—	37	Walking Away a Winner
"455 Rocket"	1997	21	—	16	Love Travels
"I'm on Your Side"	1997	—	—	—	Love Travels
"Love Travels"	1997	39	—	79	Love Travels
"Patiently Waiting"	1998	—	—	—	Love Travels
"Trouble with Angels"	2000	53	—	—	The Innocent Years
"BFD"	2000	63	—	46	The Innocent Years
"They Are the Roses"	2002	—	—	—	Roses
"Live It"	2005	—	—	—	Right Out of Nowhere
"I Can't Stand Up Alone"	2018	—	—	—	Pretty Bird
"Ode to Billie Joe"	2018	—	—	—	Pretty Bird
"St. Theresa"	2018	—	—	—	Pretty Bird
"Mercy Now"	2018	—	—	—	Pretty Bird
"Turn Off the News (Build a Garden)"	2022	—	—	—	—N/a
"—" denotes a recording that did not chart or was not released in that territory.

=== As a collaborative and featured artist ===
List of singles, with selected chart positions, showing other relevant details
Title	Year	Peak chart positions						Album
Title	Year	US	US Cou.	US AC	CAN	CAN Cou.	FR	Album
"Voices That Care" (also credited as Voices That Care)	1991	11	—	6	61	—	—	—N/a
"Romeo" (credited as Dolly Parton & Friends)	1993	50	27	—	—	33	—	Slow Dancing with the Moon
"Teach Your Children" (credited as The Red Hots)	1994	—	75	—	—	—	—	Red Hot + Country
"Love Affair" (Johnny Hallyday featuring Kathy Mattea)	1995	—	—	—	—	—	35	Rough Town
"Among the Missing" (with Michael McDonald)	1999	—	73	—	—	—	—	—N/a
"Brush My Teeth with Coca-Cola" (with Tim O'Brien)	2015	—	—	—	—	—	—	—N/a
"—" denotes a recording that did not chart or was not released in that territory.

== Videography ==
=== Video albums ===
List of albums, showing all relevant details
Title	Album details
From the Heart	Released: 1990; Label: PolyGram Music Video; Formats: VHS
The Videos	Released: 1994; Label: PolyGram; Formats: VHS
Montana Christmas Skies (John Denver with Clint Black, Kathy Mattea, Patty Loveless)	Released: 1996; Label: LaserLight; Formats: VHS
Sounds of the Season	Released: 2003; Label: Captain Potato; Formats: DVD
The Best of Kathy Mattea: Live in Concert	Released: March 29, 2005; Label: K-tel; Formats: DVD

=== Lead music videos ===
List of music videos, showing year released and director
Title	Year	Director(s)	Ref.
"You've Got a Soft Place to Fall"	1984	—N/a	
"Walk the Way the Wind Blows"	1986	—N/a	
"Eighteen Wheels and a Dozen Roses"	1988	Jim May; Coke Sams	
"Come from the Heart"	1989	Jim May	
"Where've You Been"	1989	Jim May	
"The Battle Hymn of Love" (with Tim O'Brien)	1990	Bill Pope	
"Time Passes By"	1991	Jack Cole	
"Asking Us to Dance"	1991	Jack Cole	
"Lonesome Standard Time"	1992	Jack Cole	
"Standing Knee Deep in a River (Dying of Thirst)"	1993	Michael Salomon	
"There's a New Kid in Town"	1993	Steven Goldmann	
"Mary, Did You Know?"	1993	Jim Hershleder	
"Walking Away a Winner"	1994	Steven Goldmann	
"Nobody's Gonna Rain on Our Parade"	1994	Steven Goldmann	
"Maybe She's Human"	1994	Jim Hershleder	
"Clown in Your Rodeo"	1995	Steven Goldmann	
"455 Rocket"	1997	Steven Goldmann	
"I'm on Your Side"	1997	Steven Goldmann	
"The Trouble with Angels"	2000	Steven Goldmann	
"Hello, My Name Is Coal"	2012	Becky Fluke	

=== Collaborative and featured music videos ===
List of music videos, showing year released, other artists and director
Title	Year	Director(s)	Ref.
"Voices That Care" (credited with various artists)	1991	David S. Jackson	
"Romeo" (credited as Dolly Parton & Friends)	1993	Randee St. Nicholas	
"Teach Your Children" (credited as The Red Hots)	1994	—N/a	
"He Thinks He'll Keep Her" (Mary Chapin Carpenter with various artists)	1994	Bud Schaetzle	
"Love Affair" (Johnny Hallyday featuring Kathy Mattea)	1995	Dani Jacobs	
"Among the Missing" (duet with Michael McDonald)	1999	—N/a	

== Other appearances ==
List of non-single guest appearances, with other performing artists, showing year released and album name
Title	Year	Other artist(s)	Album	Ref.
"Jesus on Your Mind"	1991	Glen Campbell	Walkin' in the Sun	
"The Southern Soldier Boy"	1991	—N/a	Songs of the Civil War	
"Somebody's Darling"	1991	—N/a	Songs of the Civil War	
"Vacant Chair"	1991	—N/a	Songs of the Civil War	
"Final Frontier"	1991	Roy Rogers	Roy Rogers Tribute	
"The Christmas Song"	1993	The A-Strings	Warner Bros. Records Presents a Christmas Tradition Volume III	
"That's Why"	1994	John Gorka	Out of the Valley	
"Furniture"	1994	John Gorka	Out of the Valley	
"Dublin Blues"	1995	Guy Clark	Dublin Blues	
"There Were Roses"	1997	John Whelan	Celtic Crossroads	
"Christ Child's Lullaby"	1997	Thomas Moore	The Soul of Christmas: A Celtic Music Celebration	
"We Are the One"	1997	Paul Brandt	Outside the Frame	
"Bright Morning Star"	1998	Ralph Stanley	Clinch Mountain Country	
"When I Run"	1998	Suzy Bogguss	Nobody Love, Nobody Gets Hurt	
"At My Window"	2001	Townes Van Zandt	Texas Country Rain: The Texas Country Recordings	
"Millworker"	2002	Milladoiro	O niño do sol	
"O Come All Ye Faithful"	2009	Charlie Daniels	Joy to the World: A Bluegrass Christmas	
"Remember Me"	2016	John Prine	For Better, or Worse	
"Dreaming My Dreams with You"	2016	John Prine	For Better, or Worse	
