= List of awards and nominations received by Kathy Mattea =

Kathy Mattea awards and nominations
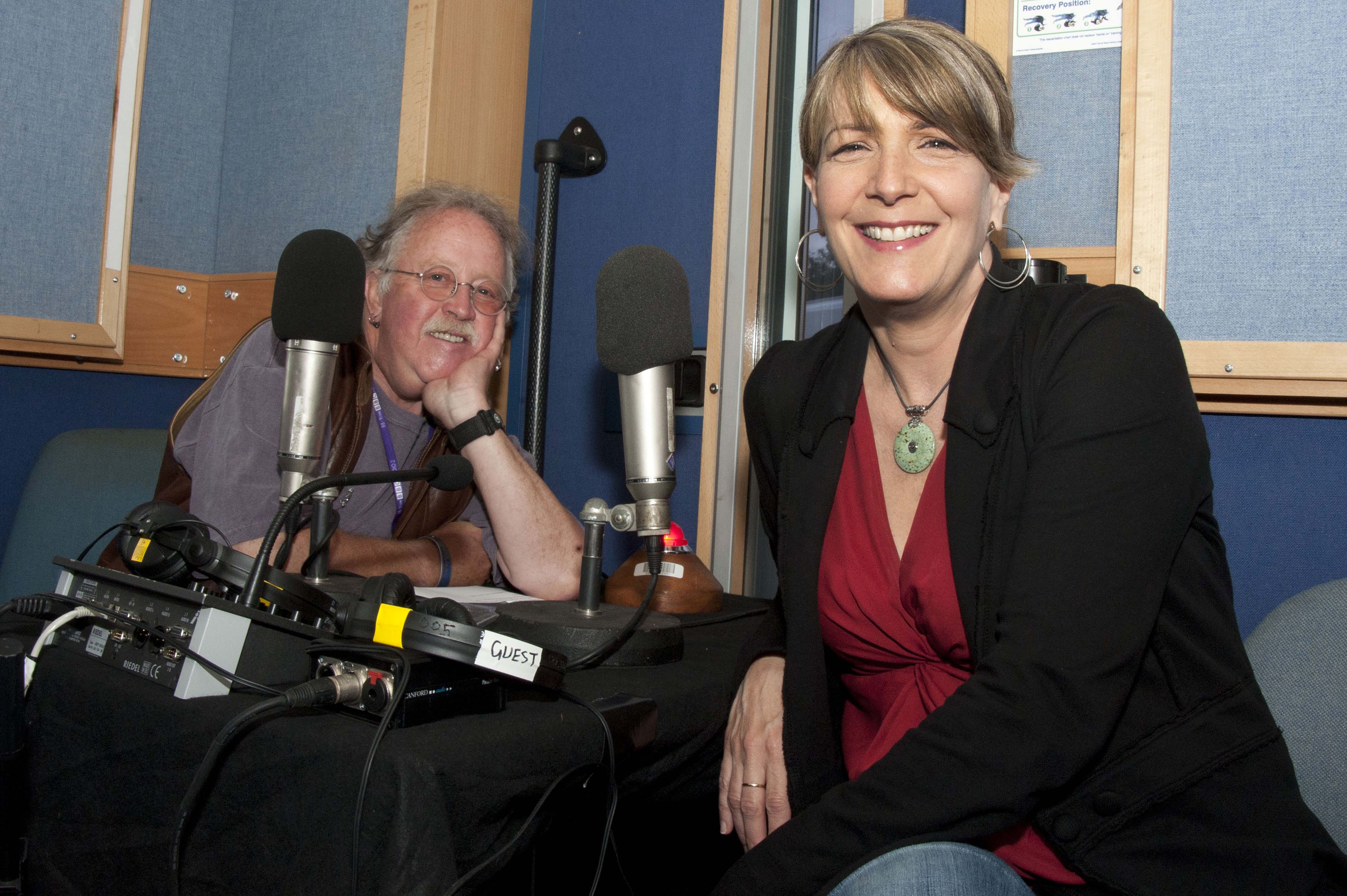
- Mattea interviewed by Mike Harding, 2010
Awards and nominations
Award	Wins	Nominations
Country Music Association	4	11
Academy of Country Music	4	6
Grammy Awards	2	6

American country artist Kathy Mattea has won ten awards and has received 23 nominations for her work. Mattea has won four awards from the Academy of Country Music, including two for her 1988 single, "Eighteen Wheels and a Dozen Roses". She has received four awards from the Country Music Association, including two for Female Vocalist of the Year. Mattea has also won two Grammy Awards. Her first was for her 1989 single, "Where've You Been". Mattea has also received two nominations from the American Music Awards for her recordings in the early 1990s.

== Academy of Country Music Awards ==
Year	Nominee / work	Award	Result	Ref.
1983	Kathy Mattea	Top New Female Vocalist	Nominated	
1987	Kathy Mattea	Top Female Vocalist	Nominated	
1988	Kathy Mattea	Top Female Vocalist	Nominated	
1988	"Eighteen Wheels and a Dozen Roses"	Single of the Year	Won	
1988	"Eighteen Wheels and a Dozen Roses"	Song of the Year	Won	
1989	Album of the Year	Willow in the Wind	Nominated	
1989	Kathy Mattea	Top Female Vocalist	Won	
1989	"Where've You Been"	Song of the Year	Won	
1990	Kathy Mattea	Top Female Vocalist	Nominated	
1997	"455 Rocket"	Video of the Year	Nominated	

== American Music Awards ==
Year	Nominee / work	Award	Result	Ref.
1989	"Eighteen Wheels and a Dozen Roses"	Favorite Country Song	Nominated	
1991	Kathy Mattea	Favorite Country Female Artist	Nominated	
1992	Kathy Mattea	Favorite Country Female Artist	Nominated	

== Country Music Association Awards ==
Year	Nominee / work	Award	Result	Ref.
1986	Kathy Mattea	Horizon Award	Nominated	
1987	Kathy Mattea	Female Vocalist of the Year	Nominated	
1987	"Walk the Way the Wind Blows"	Single of the Year	Nominated	
1988	Untasted Honey	Album of the Year	Nominated	
1988	Kathy Mattea	Female Vocalist of the Year	Nominated	
1988	"Eighteen Wheels and a Dozen Roses"	Single of the Year	Won	
1989	Willow in the Wind	Album of the Year	Nominated	
1989	Kathy Mattea	Female Vocalist of the Year	Won	
1990	Kathy Mattea	Entertainer of the Year	Nominated	
1990	Kathy Mattea	Female Vocalist of the Year	Won	
1990	"Where've You Been"	Music Video of the Year (with Jim May)	Nominated	
1990	"Where've You Been"	Single of the Year	Nominated	
1991	Kathy Mattea	Female Vocalist of the Year	Nominated	
1997	"455 Rocket"	Music Video of the Year (with Steven Goldmann)	Won	
1997	"You've Got a Friend in Me" (with George Jones)	Vocal Event of the Year	Nominated	

== Grammy Awards ==
Year	Nominee / work	Award	Result	Ref.
1987	"Love at the Five and Dime"	Best Female Country Vocal Performance	Nominated	
1990	Willow in the Wind	Best Female Country Vocal Performance	Nominated	
1991	"Where've You Been"	Best Female Country Vocal Performance	Won	
1992	Time Passes By	Best Female Country Vocal Performance	Nominated	
1994	"Romeo" (Dolly Parton with various artists)	Best Country Collaboration with Vocals	Nominated	
1994	Good News	Best Southern, Country or Bluegrass Gospel Album	Won	
1995	"Teach Your Children" (with Suzy Bogguss, Crosby, Stills & Nash, and Alison Krauss)	Best Country Collaboration with Vocals	Nominated	
2009	Coal	Best Traditional Folk Album	Nominated	
