= Right Out of Nowhere =

Studio album by Kathy Mattea
- Released: September 27, 2005
- Studio: High Horse; Highlands Digital; King's Wood; Mick's Mix; Minnesota Man's Studios; Playground Studios; Pure Music
- Genre: Country; folk; rock
- Length: 47:55
- Label: Narada
- Producer: Kathy Mattea

Kathy Mattea chronology
Joy for Christmas Day (2003)	Right Out of Nowhere (2005)	Coal (2008)

Singles from Right Out of Nowhere
- 1. "Live It" Released: 2005

Right Out of Nowhere is a studio album by American country artist, Kathy Mattea. It was released on September 27, 2005, via Narada Productions and was the fourteenth studio album in her career. The disc featured 11 tracks of original material, all of which were self-produced by Mattea herself. The album was developed from her own personal struggles that helped create a variety of musical styles onto the project. The disc received positive reception at the time of its release and charted on the American country albums chart.

== Background ==
Kathy Mattea was considered among the "most respected female country stars of her era", according to Steve Huey of AllMusic. During the eighties and nineties decades, 40 of Mattea's singles reached the American country songs chart, four of which went to the number one spot. After nearly two decades of commercial success, Mattea left her longtime Nashville label in favor of the independent company, Narada Productions. Her first Narada project was 2002's Roses.

Following the album's release, Mattea lost her father to cancer and her mother to Alzheimer's disease. During the same period, she temporarily separated from her husband, songwriter Jon Vezner. The pair reconciled and Mattea took her grief into the recording of her next Narada project titled, Right Out of Nowhere. According to Mattea, the album was built off an acoustic sound she developed from being on tour with her long-time guitarist, Bill Cooley. "It gave us a sound and a point of view, and we decided to make this record acoustically," she recounted.

== Recording and content ==
Right Out of Nowhere was cut in a live format during a six-month time span. "We sat in a circle in the studio, and put mikes up and let things bleed through, and didn't worry about putting people in isolation booths," Mattea remembered. The album was produced entirely by Mattea herself at seven different recording studios: High Horse, Highlands Digital, King's Wood, Mick's Mix, Minnesota Man's Studios, Playground Studios and Pure Music. With the exception of one studio based in Charlotte, North Carolina, the album was recorded at studios in Nashville, Tennessee. A total of 11 tracks comprised the disc. The album featured three covers: The Rolling Stones's "Gimme Shelter", John Fogerty's "Down on the Corner" and the gospel spiritual "Wade in the Water". One track was co-written by Mattea, "Give It Away" (co-written with Bob Halligan Jr. and Jon Vezner). The song was based on a real-life event when Mattea met musician Keb' Mo' for the first time. Another track, "Love's Not Through with Me Yet", was based on Mattea's relationships that were "rebuilt from the ground up".

== Release, singles and critical reception ==
Professional ratings
Review scores
Source	Rating
AllMusic	3.5/5 stars
PopMatters	6/10

Right Out of Nowhere was released through Narada Productions on September 27, 2005. It was originally distributed as a compact disc, but was later released to digital sites such as Apple Music. The album spent one week on America's Billboard Top Country Albums chart, peaking at number 73 in October 2005. To date, it is her lowest charting disc on the country albums chart. One single was spawned from the project: "Live It". The single was issued as a compact disc with two tracks: a radio edit and the original album version.

Right Out of Nowhere was met with positive reception from critics and journalists. Thom Jurek of AllMusic rated the project 3.5 out of five stars and concluded, "Mattea is one of those singers who can do anything she likes; her emotive phrasing and willingness to stretch herself are commendable, and Right Out of Nowhere is one of her most ambitious outings yet." Matt Cibula of PopMatters gave the album a six out of ten rating. He found Mattea to resemble that of a folk singer rather than that of a country singer. Cibula praised the album's song selection and her vocals, noting a change in her vocal performance since her last album release. He concluded by saying, "Kathy Mattea is making me feel better in this shitty world. It’s a good record, it’s a clean record, it’s a pretty record." The Chicago Tribune noted Mattea's eclectic mix of styles in the album, saying, "Twenty years into her career, Kathy Mattea continues surprising audiences with her genre jumping."

== Track listing ==
CD and digital versions
No.	Title	Writer(s)	Length
1.	"Right Outta Nowhere"	Christine Kane; Steve Seskin	4:08
2.	"Gimme Shelter"	Jagger–Richards	4:15
3.	"Hurt Some"	Mark D. Sanders; Tia Sillers	4:27
4.	"Love's Not Through with Me Yet"	Darrell Scott	4:38
5.	"Loving You, Letting Go"	Steven Bliss; Maia Sharp	3:27
6.	"Live It"	Harley Allen	4:10
7.	"I Hope You're Happy Now"	Skip Ewing; Angela Kaset	4:39
8.	"Down on the Corner"	John Fogerty	3:33
9.	"Only Heaven Knows"	Jamie Houston; J.D. Martin	4:19
10.	"Give It Away"	Bob Halligan Jr.; Kathy Mattea; Jon Vezner	4:21
11.	"Wade in the Water"	Traditional	5:53
Total length:			47:55

== Personnel ==
All credits are adapted from the liner notes of Right Out of Nowhere and AllMusic.

Musical personnel

- Kathy Mattea – lead vocals, acoustic guitar (2), percussion (4), whistle (4), arrangements (11)
- Carson Whitsett – Wurlitzer electric piano (1, 5, 8), organ (1, 2, 4, 11), Hammond B3 organ (3, 6, 7, 10), acoustic piano (4, 6, 7, 9)
- Randy Leago – accordion (1, 4, 6, 8, 10), sitar (1), Wurlitzer electric piano (2, 3, 11), percussion (2, 8, 9), bass flute (2, 9), harmonica (5, 6), alto flute (9)
- Mick Conley – toy piano (9)
- Bill Cooley – acoustic guitar (1, 2, 4–11), bouzouki (1), archtop guitar (3),dobro (3, 10), slide guitar (3), electric guitar (5), arrangements (11)
- Eamonn O'Rourke – mandolin (1–6, 8, 10), fiddle (4, 6), bouzouki (9)
- Steve Slum – steel guitar (6)
- Rick Blackwell – bass (1–6, 8–11), backing vocals (2)
- Jim Brock – cajón (1, 3), percussion (1–5, 8, 9), drums (4, 8–10), knee slaps (6, 8), Jew's harp (6), road case (11)
- Jim Hoke – harmonica (8, 11), autoharp (10)
- Paul Martin – backing vocals (2, 6)
- Settles Connection – backing vocals (3, 8, 11)
- Suzy Bogguss – backing vocals (4)
- Darrell Scott – backing vocals (4)
- Randy Sharp – backing vocals (5)
- Terry Wilson – backing vocals (6, 9)
- Jon Vezner – backing vocals (10)

Production personnel

- Kathy Mattea – producer
- Mick Conley – recording, mixing
- Stephen Gause – recording assistant
- Ryan Jenkins – recording assistant
- Jimmy Jernigan – recording assistant
- John Mayfield – mastering at Mayfield Mastering (Nashville, Tennessee)
- Kristin Barlowe – photography
- Rene Scheiderer – photography (band members)
- Chris Verespej – design

== Chart performance ==
Chart (2005)	Peak position
US Top Country Albums (Billboard)	73

== Release history ==
Region	Date	Format	Label	Ref.
Australia and Europe	September 27, 2005	Compact disc	Narada Productions	
North America	September 27, 2005	Compact disc	Narada Productions	
North America	2000s	Digital	Narada Productions	
