= You'll Never Leave Harlan Alive =

1997 song by Darrell Scott

Song by Darrell Scott

from the album Aloha from Nashville
- Released: April 22, 1997
- Genre: Country, Bluegrass
- Length: 5:03
- Label: JustUs
- Songwriter: Darrell Scott
- Producers: Darrell Scott; Verlon Thompson

"You'll Never Leave Harlan Alive" is a song written and originally recorded by American musician Darrell Scott. Since his original recording in 1997, the song has also been recorded by Patty Loveless, Brad Paisley, and Kathy Mattea, and performed live by Patty Loveless as a duet with Chris Stapleton at the 56th Annual Country Music Association Awards ceremony. The song is about the multigenerational coal mining industry in Harlan County, Kentucky.

== History ==
Darrell Scott wrote the song in 1997 and recorded it on his debut album Aloha from Nashville. The song is about the difficult lives of underground coal miners in Kentucky. Scott said the inspiration for the song came from a visit to Harlan County, Kentucky, in an attempt to research his own family history. While in a cemetery attempting to find his great-grandfather's grave, he saw the phrase "you'll never leave Harlan alive" on a tombstone.

Following Scott's original version, country music singer Patty Loveless recorded it in 2001 for her album Mountain Soul. Loveless' rendition featured Scott playing banjo. According to Scott, Loveless had difficulty singing the song at first. Her producer and husband, Emory Gordy Jr., placed a picture of Loveless' father (who was a coal miner) before her and told her to "sing the song to her father". In 2002, Loveless' rendition was nominated at the International Bluegrass Music Awards for Song of the Year.

The same year as Loveless, Brad Paisley covered the song on his album Part II. Paisley said that he chose to record the song because, being a native of West Virginia, he had seen the effect that coal mining had on communities in that region. Kathy Mattea also covered it on her 2008 album Coal, a concept album themed around coal mining. Montgomery Gentry recorded the track prior to Troy Gentry's death in 2017, and it was later included on their 2019 album Outskirts. Other cover versions have been recorded by Michael & Carrie Kline, Red Molly, and Beth Davidson.

In the Encyclopedia of Great Popular Song Recordings, the song's plot is incorrectly described as being about "a federal lawman who had left his native Harlan County...but winds up dealing with adversaries back on the old home turf." While the lyrics contain no reference to a federal lawman, the song was used in several episodes of the similarly themed Justified. In 2010, Brad Paisley's cover of the song was the closing song during the final scene of the final episode of the first season. The song was again used in the final episode of the second season. The fourth season's final episode used a version by Dave Alvin, and the fifth season's final episode used a version by the Ruby Friedman Orchestra. The final episode of the series featured the original composition by Darrell Scott himself.

In November 2022, Loveless joined Chris Stapleton to perform the song at the 56th Annual Country Music Association Awards with Darrell Scott playing dobro on the live performance.

== Chart history ==
=== Patty Loveless ===
Chart (2022)	Peak position
US Country Digital Song Sales (Billboard)	16
