= Christine Kane =

American musician and businessperson

Christine Kane is an American musician and businessperson. She is the founder and CEO of Uplevel You. The company is based in Asheville, North Carolina

Prior to founding Uplevel You, Kane had a fifteen-year career in the music industry. Kane is an American folk singer-songwriter and acoustic guitarist, and she produced seven albums under her own label, Firepink—selling more than 100,000 copies. Her album "Rain & Mud & Wild & Green" (2002) was named Best Folk Album by Borders. Her concert DVD, Live at the Diana Wortham Theatre won a Telly Award. And Country star Kathy Mattea recorded Kane's song "Right Out of Nowhere" (written with Steve Seskin). Kane has appeared with John Mayer, The Beach Boys, Los Lobos, Nanci Griffith, and Shawn Colvin, among many others.

== Early life and education ==
Kane grew up in Fairfax, Virginia, a suburb of Washington, D.C., and was an avid writer as a young person. She graduated from Boston College, where she studied journalism.

== Career overview ==
Upon graduating from college, Kane started working at public relations firm in Washington, D.C. In 1991, she moved to Asheville, North Carolina to pursue songwriting and music. Seeing a performance by Mary Chapin Carpenter in Washington had inspired Kane. Kane and musician David LaMatte helped found a "local songwriters scene" in Asheville.

In 2010, Kane started her company, Uplevel You, which went on to become a million dollar marketing company. Today, Kane leads nine administrative staff and four coaches at Uplevel You headquarters in Asheville, North Carolina.

== Discography ==
- This Time Last Year (1995)
- A Thousand Girls (1997)
- Live (2000)
- Rain and Mud and Wild and Green (2002)
- Right Outta Nowhere (2004)
- Live at the Diana Wortham Theatre DVD (2007)
- A Friday Night in One Lifetime CD (2007)
- Wide Awake CD (2009)
