= Brightest and Best =

Christian hymn

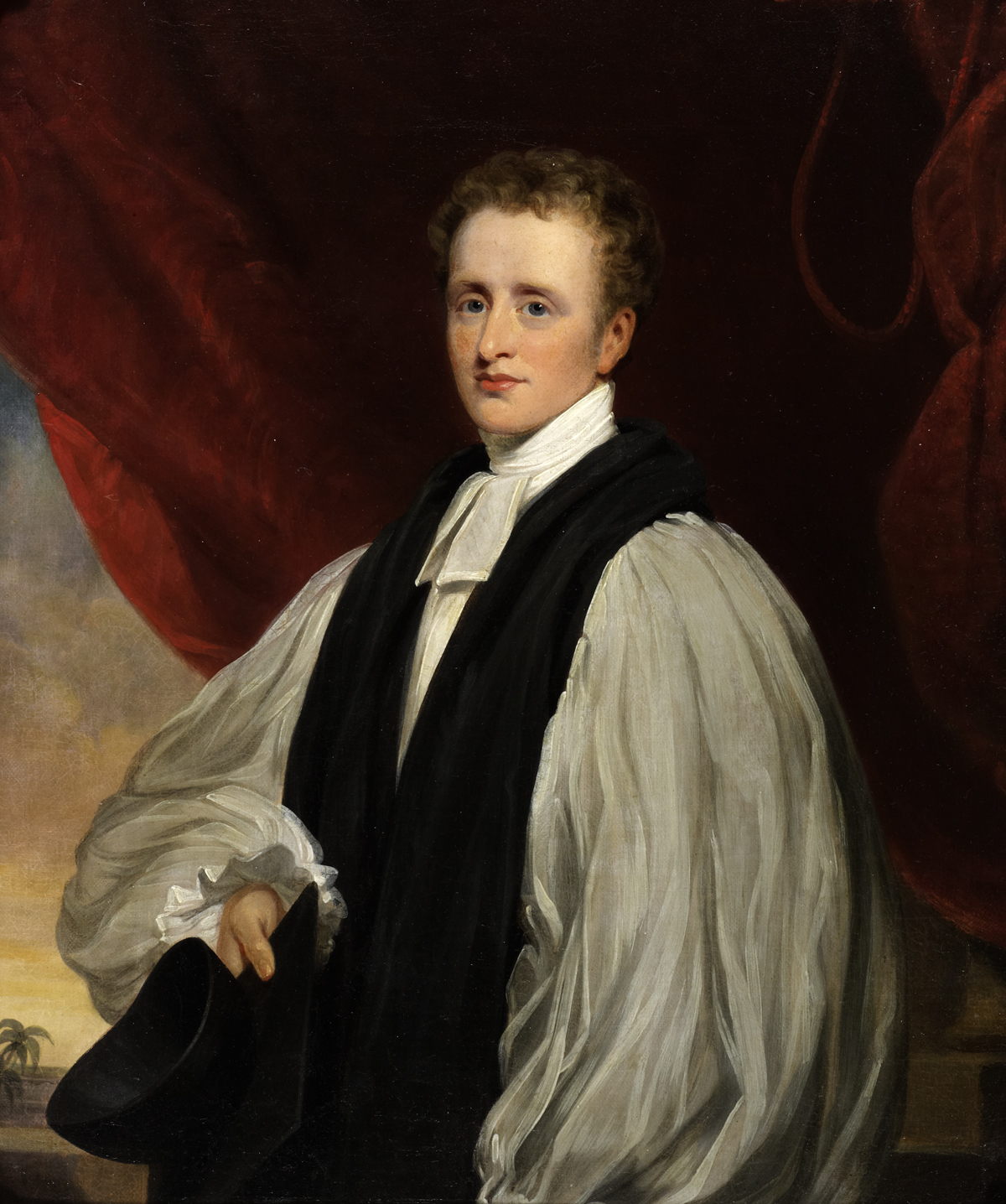
- "Reginald Heber" (1822) by Thomas Phillips
- Genre: Hymn
- Written: 1811
- Text: Reginald Heber
- Based on: Isaiah 60:1-6
- Meter: 11.10.11.10
- Melody: "Morning Star" by James P. Harding, "Epiphany" by Joseph Thrupp, and "Star in the East" (unattributed, first printed 1826)

Brightest and Best / Star in the East
Audio recording, performed multi-tracked

"Brightest and Best" (occasionally rendered by its first line, "Brightest and Best of the Sons of the Morning"; indexed in shapenote hymnals by the title of the tune "Star in the East") is a Christian hymn, sometimes considered a carol, written in or before 1811 by the Anglican bishop Reginald Heber to be sung at the feast of Epiphany. It first appeared in the Christian Observer in November 1811, and was subsequently included in Heber's widow's compilation of hymns entitled Hymns Written and Adapted to the Weekly Service of the Church Year in 1827. It can be sung to a number of tunes, including "Liebster Immanuel" (no 41 in The English Hymnal); "Morning Star" by James P. Harding; "Epiphany" by Joseph Thrupp; and "Star in the East", first appearing uncredited in the 1826 edition of the Temple Harmony tunebook edited by Japheth Coombs Washburn. It appears in many hymnals across different Christian traditions. It has been recorded by a number of artists, including Glen Campbell, Joanne Hogg and Kathy Mattea (on her album Good News).

The Kentucky traditional singer Jean Ritchie often sang this and told of her childhood memory of her grandmother sitting by the fire and singing it quietly to herself on Twelfth Night; the Library of Congress collected it from her in 1951.

== Lyrics ==
Brightest and best of the sons of the morning;
Dawn on our darkness and lend us thine aid;
Star of the East, the horizon adorning,
Guide where our infant Redeemer is laid.

Cold on His cradle the dewdrops are shining;
Low lies His head with the beasts of the stall;
Angels adore Him in slumber reclining,
Maker and Monarch and Saviour of all!

Say, shall we yield Him, in costly devotion,
Odors of Edom and offerings divine?
Gems of the mountain and pearls of the ocean,
Myrrh from the forest, or gold from the mine?

Vainly we offer each ample oblation,
Vainly with gifts would His favor secure;
Richer by far is the heart’s adoration,
Dearer to God are the prayers of the poor.

Later printings of the hymn sometimes substitute "stars" (or "suns") for "sons" in the first line due to worries about "son of the morning" also referring to Lucifer.

The 1827 Hymns Written and Adapted to the Weekly Service of the Church Year prints a repeat of the first verse at the end.

== Variant shapenote text ==
A different version of the lyrics is found in shapenote hymnals, seemingly adopted from Temple Harmony (1826) and subsequently used in Baptist Harmony (1834), Southern Harmony (1835) and latterly Shenandoah Harmony (2013). It changes Heber's first verse to be a refrain, and adds a different first verse:

Hail the blest morn, see the great Mediator
Down from the regions of glory descend!
Shepherds, go worship the babe in the manger;
Lo, for his guard the bright angels attend.

The earliest surviving appearance of the extra verse is in the 1823 Brick Church Hymns. No author is mentioned.

Other differences include replacing the line "Maker and Monarch and Saviour of all" with "Wise men and shepherds before him do fall"; "Eden" instead of "Edom" in verse 3; and "gold", instead of "gifts", in the final verse. This last may preserve Heber's first draft of the lyrics: it is "gold" in the 1811 printing, but by December 1820 Heber had altered the line, as shown in a draft included in a letter to Henry Hart Milman.

The 2025 edition of the Sacred Harp includes the uncredited 1823 verse, but otherwise uses Heber's original lyrics rather than the modified version common to other shapenote tunebooks.
