= Joy for Christmas Day =

Studio album by Kathy Mattea
- Released: September 30, 2003
- Recorded: 2001–2003
- Studio: Bingham Bend, High Horse Studio, Minnesota Man Studios and Playground Recording Studios (Nashville, Tennessee); Ed's (Franklin, Tennessee)
- Genre: Country; Christmas
- Length: 43:18
- Label: Narada
- Producer: Ed Cash; Kathy Mattea

Kathy Mattea chronology
Roses (2002)	Joy for Christmas Day (2003)	Right Out of Nowhere (2005)

Joy for Christmas Day is a studio album by American country artist, Kathy Mattea. It was released on September 30, 2003, via Narada Productions and contained 11 tracks. It was the thirteenth studio album in Mattea's career and her second album containing Christmas music. The album mixed both covers of Christmas tunes along with new material that featured writing credits from various songwriters. The disc made the American country albums chart and was received positively by critics following its release.

== Background ==
Kathy Mattea was considered among country music's most commercially successful and respected artists during the eighties and nineties. She had a series of top ten singles, along with four that topped the country charts in North America. She had most of her commercial success while recording for the Nashville label, Mercury/PolyGram. In 2002, she left her contract so she should explore other genres outside of country. That year, she signed with Narada Productions and released the studio album, Roses. It would be followed by Mattea's second studio album of Christmas material titled Joy for Christmas Day. Her first was 1993 studio album, Good News. Mattea had more songs she compiled and wanted to re-arrange, which resulted in the creation of her second Christmas collection. "I really wanted to see what I could do creatively with it, and those were the songs I was drawn to," she told Country Music Television.

== Recording and content ==
Joy for Christmas Day was recorded between 2001 and 2003. The production was held at five different studios: Bingham Bend Studios, EDS, High Horse Studios, Minnesota Man Studios and PlayGround studios. The project was co-produced by Mattea, along with Ed Cash. Mattea also did several of the arrangements on the album. The project contained a total of 11 tracks. Four of the album's tracks were covers of Christmas songs: "Angels We Have Heard on High", "Hark! The Herald Angels Sing", "O Come All Ye Faithful" and "Christmas Collage". Other songs were newer Holiday material, such as "Baby King", written by singer-songwriter Marc Cohn. "And There's Still My Joy", was co-written by singer and songwriter Melissa Manchester. "All Because of Him" was co-written by Mattea, along with Ed Cash, Bill Cooley and Suzy Willis.

== Release, chart performance and critical reception ==
Professional ratings
Review scores
Source	Rating
Allmusic	4/5 stars

Joy for Christmas Day was released on September 30, 2003, by Narada Productions. It was Mattea's thirteenth studio album in her career and her second with Narada. It was originally issued as a compact disc. It would later be released digitally. The disc did not appear on the American Billboard until December 27, 2003. It spent one week there, reaching the number 69 position. Mattea celebrated the album's release by conducting a Christmas tour, which ran from October 2 through December 14, 2003.

Joy for Christmas Day received a positive response from critics. Jonathan Widran gave it four out of five stars in his review, praising the album's unique mixing of arrangements and styles. "The key to a strong holiday CD is finding clever new arrangements of the classics and offering originals that present the spirit in a unique way. Mattea does both," he commented. In discussing Mattea's holiday tour, the Star Tribune described the album as "excellent", highlighting the tracks "Baby King" and the song, "And There's My Joy". Brian Wahlert of Country Standard Time concluded, "Although Mattea's years in the country radio limelight have long passed, music fans should rejoice that she is still blessing us with her music."

== Track listing ==
CD and digital versions
No.	Title	Writer(s)	Length
1.	"Christmas Collage"	Traditional	3:36
2.	"Unto Us a Child Is Born"	Craig Bickhardt; Thom Schuyler	2:52
3.	"Angels We Have Heard on High"	Traditional; arranged by James Chadwick	2:54
4.	"Straw Against the Chill"	Bob Franke	4:50
5.	"Baby King"	Marc Cohn	4:06
6.	"When the Baby Grew Up"	Rob Mathes	4:59
7.	"Hark! The Herald Angels Sing"	Felix Mendelssohn; Charles Wesley	3:06
8.	"O Come All Ye Faithful"	Frederick Oakeley; John Francis Wade	3:49
9.	"All Because of Him"	Ed Cash; Bill Cooley; Kathy Mattea; Suzy Wills	3:43
10.	"Sing, Mary, Sing"	Jennifer Knapp	4:14
11.	"There's Still My Joy"	Beth Nielsen Chapman; Melissa Manchester; Matt Rollings	5:09
Total length:			43:22

== Personnel ==
All credits are adapted from the liner notes of Joy for Christmas Day and AllMusic.

Musical personnel

- Kathy Mattea – lead vocals, backing vocals, whistle
- Ben Shive – keyboards
- Carson Whitsett – keyboards, acoustic piano, Wurlitzer electric piano, Hammond organ
- Ed Cash – acoustic guitar, electric guitars, mandolin, backing vocals
- Mick Conley – acoustic guitar, octave bass
- Bill Cooley – acoustic guitar, National steel guitar
- Gerry Gillespie – bass, backing vocals
- Matt Pierson – bass
- Byron House – upright bass
- Jim Brock – drums, percussion
- Dan Needham – drums
- Joanie Madden – whistle
- Chris Carmichael – cello, violin, backing vocals
- Nick DiStefano – backing vocals
- Bob Halligan Jr. – backing vocals
- Terry Wilson – backing vocals

Production personnel

- Ed Cash – producer, mixing
- Kathy Mattea – producer, arrangements
- Bill Cooley – arrangements
- Mick Conley – recording, mixing
- John Mayfield – mastering at Mayfield Mastering (Nashville, Tennessee)
- Connie Gage – art direction, design
- Russ Harrington – photography
- Jamie Kimmelman – wardrobe
- Melanie Shelley – hair, make-up

== Chart performance ==
Chart (2003)	Peak position
US Top Country Albums (Billboard)	69

== Release history ==
Release history and formats for Joy for Christmas Day
Region	Date	Format	Label	Ref.
North America	September 30, 2003	CD	Narada Productions	
North America	2000s–2010s	Digital download; streaming	Narada Productions, Inc.	
