= Pretty Bird (album) =

Studio album by Kathy Mattea
- Released: September 7, 2018
- Genre: Americana; country; folk
- Length: 49:28
- Label: Captain Potato; Thirty Tigers
- Producer: Tim O'Brien

Kathy Mattea chronology
Calling Me Home (2012)	Pretty Bird (2018)

Singles from Pretty Bird
- 1. "I Can't Stand Up Alone" Released: July 13, 2018; 2. "Ode to Billie Joe" Released: July 13, 2018; 3. "St. Theresa" Released: August 24, 2018; 4. "Mercy Now" Released: August 24, 2018

Pretty Bird is a studio album by American country artist, Kathy Mattea. It was released on September 7, 2018 via Captain Potato Records and the Thirty Tigers label. It marked the first album of new material by Mattea in several years after enduring several vocal challenges in previous years. The album contained 11 tracks that mixed cover tunes with original material. Pretty Bird received positive reviews from critics upon its release and included four singles.

== Background ==
Kathy Mattea was among country music's most commercially-successful artists during the eighties and nineties. She had a series of top ten and 20 singles on the American country charts, along with having albums certify gold and winning a Grammy Award. In 2002, she left her long-time Nashville record label in pursuit of other recording companies that would allow her to explore more creative musical avenues. She released a series of albums during the 2000s decade that included styles of Celtic, folk and Appalachian music. During the 2010s, Mattea began experiencing vocal problems that made her question whether she should continue performing. "It was emotionally really difficult because, when I felt my voice start to change, I thought, ‘Okay, so is this be beginning of the end? Or is this just a change?’," she told Billboard.

Mattea then found a Jazz vocal coach who helped her explore new ways for her to use her singing voice. She also began attempting to sing new material with her long-time guitarist, Bill Cooley. Her manager helped her find more shows where Mattea could perform and try out material, which ultimately helped give her the confidence to record a new album again. The result was her first new album in six years, Pretty Bird.

== Recording and content ==
Pretty Bird was produced by Tim O'Brien. According to O'Brien, the album took about six months to create as both individuals had separate commitments to their own music careers. The disc contained a total of 12 tracks which mixed original material with covers of songs by other artists. The album mixed aspects of folk music, with Americana and country. The opening track, "Chocolate on My Tongue", was a cover of the original by The Wood Brothers. The second track, "Ode to Billie Joe", was first recorded and made popular by Bobbie Gentry. Also included is a cover of the traditional folk song, "He Moves Through the Fair", whose theme is centered on murder. Mattea also covers Mary Gauthier's "Mercy Now", which reflected the current political climate. "At their best, songs make us feel so not all alone when we’re going through something that’s really hard," Mattea commented. The title track (which is the closing song on the album) was first recorded and penned by Hazel Dickens. Songwriter (and Mattea's husband), Jon Vezner, contributed two new tracks to the album: "October Song" and "Tell Me What You Ache For".

== Release, singles and reception ==
Professional ratings
Review scores
Source	Rating
PopMatters	7/10

Pretty Bird was released on September 7, 2018 on Captain Potato Records in conjunction with the Thirty Tigers label. The album was offered as a compact disc or as a digital release. Four singles preceded the album's release. Both "I Can't Stand Up Alone" and "Ode to Billie Joe" were issued as singles on July 13, 2018. It was then followed by the release of "St. Theresa" and "Mercy Now" as singles on August 24, 2018.

Pretty Bird received a mostly positive response from critics following its release. Bobby Moore of Wide Open Country commented that the disc is the "studio equivalent of a Nashville cafe's resident singer-songwriter adding less-obvious covers to her expected set." Steve Horowitz of PopMatters rated the album 7/10, praising the album's production by noting a difference in Mattea from previous works: "Mattea has been through a lot over the past half dozen years. It’s good she’s back, but she’s not the same as she once was." Jim Hynes of Country Standard Time praised Mattea's newfound vocal delivery in his review: "Age had helped open Mattea's lower register, and songs she'd previously shied away from suddenly emerged with a new vibrant life. Thankfully Mattea is back."

== Track listing ==
CD and digital versions
No.	Title	Writer(s)	Length
1.	"Chocolate on My Tongue"	Oliver Wood	3:48
2.	"Ode to Billie Joe"	Bobbie Gentry	5:24
3.	"Mercy Now"	Mary Gauthier	5:27
4.	"Little Glass of Wine"	Jesse Winchester	4:01
5.	"He Moves Through the Fair"	Traditional	3:51
6.	"St. Theresa"	Eric Bazilian; Rick Chertoff; Robert Hyman; Joan Osborne	4:19
7.	"This Love Will Carry"	Dougie MacLean	4:16
8.	"October Song"	Jon Vezner; Carson Whitsett	3:16
9.	"Tell Me What You Ache For"	Vezner; Whitsett	3:16
10.	"Holy Now"	Peter Mayer	4:13
11.	"I Can't Stand Up Alone"	Martha Carson	3:44
12.	"Pretty Bird"	Hazel Dickens	3:07
Total length:			49:28

== Personnel ==
All credits are adapted from the liner notes of Pretty Bird and AllMusic.

Musical personnel

- Jim Brock – Drums, percussion
- Bill Cooley – Acoustic guitar, guitar
- Dennis Crouch – Bass
- Dan Dugmore – Steel guitar
- Ian Fitchuk – Drums, organ
- Viktor Krauss – Bass
- Jennifer Kummer – French horn
- Dougie MacLean – Vocal harmony
- Kathy Mattea – Acoustic guitar, background vocals, lead vocals
- Charlie McCoy – Bass, bass harmonica, harmonica, vibraphone
- Tim O'Brien – Acoustic guitar, background vocals, banjo, Bouzouki, cello, fiddle, electric guitar, mandolin
- Suzy Ragsdale – Background vocals
- Calvin Settles – Background vocals
- Odessa Settles – Background vocals
- Bobby Wood – Organ, Wurlitzer
- Oliver Wood – Vocal harmony

Technical personnel

- Eric Conn – Mastering
- Bill Cooley – Arranger
- Deborah Denson – Cover painting
- Kimberly Levitan – Package design
- Carl Marsh – Horn arrangements
- Kathy Mattea – Arranger
- Tim O'Brien – Producer
- Reto Sterchi – Photography
- Sean Sullivan – Engineer, mixing

== Release history ==
Region	Date	Format	Label	Ref.
North America	September 7, 2018	Compact disc; digital	Captain Potato Records; Thirty Tigers	
