= Calling Me Home (Kathy Mattea album) =

Studio album by Kathy Mattea
- Released: September 11, 2012
- Studios: Sound Emporium Studios and Minutia Studios (Nashville, Tennessee); Cave 2 Studio (Dallas, Atlanta); Northfire Recording Studio (Amherst, Massachusetts)
- Genres: Appalachian; country; bluegrass
- Length: 44:33
- Label: Sugar Hill
- Producers: Kathy Mattea; Gary Paczosa

Kathy Mattea chronology
Coal (2008)	Calling Me Home (2012)	Pretty Bird (2018)

Calling Me Home is a studio album by American country artist, Kathy Mattea. It was released on September 11, 2012 via Sugar Hill Records and contained 12 tracks. It was Mattea's second collection of Appalachian and bluegrass music. Its themes focused on coal mining and ways people experienced living in the Appalachian Mountains. Calling Me Home appeared on both the American country albums and bluegrass albums charts following its release. It was received favorably by music critics.

== Background ==
Kathy Mattea was one of country music's most commercially-successful recording artists during the eighties and nineties decades. Four of her singles reached the top of the country charts ("Goin' Gone", "Eighteen Wheels and a Dozen Roses", "Come from the Heart" and "Burnin' Old Memories") while many more reached the top ten and top 20. Mattea had achieved this success under the Nashville record label, Mercury/PolyGram. In the 2000s, she chose to explore other musical genres and started recording for independent record labels. In 2008, she released the bluegrass-inspired album, Coal. The album inspired Mattea to look further into Appalachian and bluegrass music of her native West Virginia. This ultimately led to the making of Calling Me Home.

== Recording and content ==
In an interview with Billboard, Mattea explained that it was a challenge to record the album's material because it required a unique type of singing. "For me, it was stripping off a layer of my habitual way of singing. It was a little bit like being naked, but it’s such a gift to be challenged in my fifties as a singer to think beyond what I think I already know about singing," she explained. A total of 12 tracks comprised Calling Me Home. The album was made at four different recording studios: Cave 2 (located in Dallas, Georgia), Minutia (located in Nashville, TN), Northfire (located in Amherst, Massachusetts) and Sound Emporium (also located in Nashville). The project was co-produced by Mattea herself, along with Gary Paczosa. The album was arranged by Mattea's long-time guitarist, Bill Cooley. It also featured harmony vocals from country artists Emmylou Harris, Patty Loveless and Alison Krauss.

The album's material was a look into the Appalachian lifestyle and of various people who lived there. The title track was about a person who is about to die and "being with them while they cross that unknown threshold into the big mystery". According to Mattea, she was introduced to the song by bluegrass artist, Hazel Dickens. At one of Mattea's concerts, Dickens introduced her to the song, which was composed by Alice Gerard. Another track, "Hello My Name Is Coal", focuses on how coal mining industry has been both a blessing and a curse for the people who work within it. Other tracks such as "Gone, Gonna Rise Again" has themes related to the environment. Some of the songs were originally part of the 2008 Coal project that were shelved. Among those songs were "Now Is the Cool of the Day" and "Black Waters".

== Release and reception ==
Professional ratings
Review scores
Source	Rating
AllMusic	4/5 stars
American Songwriter	4/5 stars
PopMatters	7/10

Calling Me Home was released on September 11, 2012 on Sugar Hill Records. It was originally offered as both a compact disc and as a digital download. The disc spent two weeks on the American Billboard Top Country Albums chart, peaking at number 54 on September 29, 2012. It was also her second album to make the Billboard Top Bluegrass Albums chart. Spending 13 weeks there, it peaked at the number two position on September 29, 2012. It was her first album to make the Billboard Folk Albums chart, peaking at number 21 on September 29, 2012. A music video directed by Becky Fluke premiered in November 2012 for the song, "Hello My Name Is Coal".

The disc received a positive reception from critics following its release. Thom Jurek of AllMusic gave it four out of five stars, praising the album's traditional production and natural way Mattea delivered the music to listeners. "Calling Me Home is not only a worthy follow-up to Coal, but it presents even the most historic of these songs as timeless and ever present. It's more confident, powerful, and beautiful," Jurek concluded. Brice Ezell of PopMatters rated the album a seven out of ten and noted at its political themes: "An artist as wise as Mattea, however, knows that political concerns don’t have to give way to simplistic rhetoric or soapboxing. Instead, she knows that from our greatest struggles can come works of beauty". Hal Horowitz of American Songwriter gave the album four out of five stars as well. "She proves there can be a better, richer life after commercial stardom for those willing to take the risk," he concluded.

== Track listing ==
CD and digital versions
No.	Title	Writer(s)	Length
1.	"A Far Cry"	Janet Dowling; Michael Dowling	4:07
2.	"Gone, Gonna Rise Again"	Si Kahn	3:20
3.	"The Wood Thrush's Song"	Laurie Lewis	3:47
4.	"West Virginia Mine Disaster"	Jean Ritchie	4:29
5.	"The Maple's Lament"	Lewis	3:52
6.	"Hello, My Name Is Coal"	Larry Cordle; Jenee Fleenor	3:00
7.	"Calling Me Home"	Alice Gerrard	2:30
8.	"Black Waters"	Ritchie	4:56
9.	"West Virginia, My Home"	Hazel Dickens	4:26
10.	"Agate Hill"	Gerrard	3:47
11.	"Now Is the Cool of the Day"	Gerrard	3:25
12.	"Requiem for a Mountain"	Bill Cooley	2:37
Total length:			44:33

== Personnel ==
All credits are adapted from the liner notes of Calling Me Home and AllMusic.

Musical personnel

- Kathy Mattea – lead vocals
- Tim Lauer – accordion, pump organ, additional percussion
- Bill Cooley – acoustic guitar
- Jon Randall Stewart – electric guitar
- Bryan Sutton – acoustic guitar, electric guitar, electric guitar, high-strung guitar, banjo, octave banjo, mandolin, octave mandolin
- Stuart Duncan – banjo, fiddle, mandolin, zither
- Randy Kohrs – dobro (1), Weissenborn guitar (4, 9)
- Byron House – bass
- Jim Brock – percussion
- Tim O'Brien – harmony vocals
- Aoife O'Donovan – harmony vocals (2–4)
- Sarah Dugas – harmony vocals (4, 6)
- Oliver Wood – harmony vocals (6)
- Tim Eriksen – harmony vocals (7)
- Emmylou Harris – harmony vocals (8)
- Patty Loveless – harmony vocals (8)
- Mollie O'Brien – harmony vocals (9)
- Alison Krauss – harmony vocals (10)

Production personnel

- Kathy Mattea – producer
- Gary Pacsoza – producer, recording, mixing
- Brandon Bell – recording
- Garrett Sawyer – Tim Eriksen vocal engineer (7)
- Ellery Durgin – Patty Loveless vocal engineer (8)
- Don Cobb – mastering
- Eric Conn – mastering
- Independent Mastering (Nashville, Tennessee) – mastering location
- David McClister – photography
- Carrie Smith – art direction, design
- Barbara Kingsolver – liner notes
- Marc Dottore – management

== Chart performance ==
Chart (2012)	Peak position
US Top Bluegrass Albums (Billboard)	2
US Top Country Albums (Billboard)	54
US Americana/Folk Albums (Billboard)	21

== Release history ==
Region	Date	Format	Label	Ref.
North America	September 11, 2012	Compact disc; digital	Sugar Hill Records	
