= Street Talk (song) =

Single by Kathy Mattea

from the album Kathy Mattea
- B-side: "Heartbeat"
- Released: September 1983
- Studio: Music Mill; Sound Emporium
- Genre: Country pop
- Length: 2:42
- Label: Mercury; PolyGram
- Songwriters: Lee Domann; Ralph Whiteway
- Producers: Byron Hill; Rick Peoples

Kathy Mattea singles chronology
"Street Talk" (1983)	"Someone Is Falling in Love" (1984)

"Street Talk" is a song written by Lee Domann and Ralph Whiteway, and recorded by American country music artist Kathy Mattea. It was released in September 1983 as debut single and the first from her self-titled debut album. The song reached the top 30 of the American country chart and appeared on her self-titled debut album.

== Background and recording ==
Kathy Mattea would go on to have commercial success in the country music field during the late eighties and early nineties decades. Yet her initial recordings failed to reach the same amount of success. After recording several demo's Mattea was signed to the Mercury/PolyGram label in 1983 and she recorded her self-titled debut album during that time. Mattea's debut single was "Street Talk", which was composed by Lee Domann and Ralph Whiteway. The track was recorded the Music Mill and Sound Emporium studios, both located in Nashville, Tennessee. The sessions were produced by Byron Hill and Rick Peoples.

== Release, chart performance and reception ==
"Street Talk" was released by Mercury/PolyGram in September 1983 as a vinyl single. It was backed on the B-side by the track, "Heartbeat". "Street Talk" first appeared on America's Billboard Hot Country Songs chart on October 8, 1983. It spent 18 weeks there before peaking at number 25 on December 24, 1983. The song was later included on Mattea's eponymous debut LP, which was released in 1984. In reviewing her debut LP, William Ruhlmann of AllMusic described "Street Talk" as "disco-tinged" tune that is "a fairly representative sampling of Nashville formula country writing, make the singer more of a victim and less of a feisty character than the woman who fought back against her bad reputation on her hit."

== Track listing ==
7" vinyl single

- "Street Talk" – 2:42
- "Heartbeat" – 3:16

== Charts ==
Chart performance for "Street Talk"
Chart (1983)	Peak position
US Hot Country Songs (Billboard)	25
