= Kathy Mattea (album) =

Studio album by Kathy Mattea
- Released: March 22, 1984
- Recorded: 1983
- Studios: The Music Mill and Sound Emporium Studios (Nashville, Tennessee)
- Genre: Country
- Length: 31:30
- Labels: Mercury; PolyGram
- Producers: Rick Peoples; Byron Hill

Kathy Mattea chronology
Kathy Mattea (1984)	From My Heart (1985)

Singles from Kathy Mattea
- 1. "Street Talk" Released: September 1983; 2. "Someone Is Falling in Love" Released: January 1984; 3. "You've Got a Soft Place to Fall" Released: May 1984; 4. "That's Easy for You to Say" Released: August 1984

Professional ratings
Review scores
Source	Rating
AllMusic	3/5 stars
The Rolling Stone Album Guide	3/5 stars

Kathy Mattea is the debut studio album by American country music singer Kathy Mattea. It was released in 1984 (see 1984 in country music) on Mercury Records. It includes the singles "Street Talk", "Someone Is Falling in Love", "You've Got a Soft Place to Fall", and "That's Easy for You to Say". The song "(Back to the) Heartbreak Kid" was later released in 1986 by Restless Heart from their self-titled debut album.

== Track listing ==
No.	Title	Writer(s)	Length
1.	"Street Talk""	Lee Domann, Ralph Whiteway	2:44
2.	"Someone Is Falling in Love"	Domann, Pebe Sebert	3:05
3.	"You've Got a Soft Place to Fall"	Kerry Chater, Bob McDill, Hunter Moore	3:02
4.	"Takin' the Givin' Away"	Bob DiPiero, Jill Wood	3:15
5.	"You Know That I Do (And I Know That You Won't)"	Peter McCann	3:02
6.	"Full Time Love"	DiPiero, Tim Krekel	2:56
7.	"Somewhere Down the Road"	Tom Snow, Cynthia Weil	3:38
8.	"That's Easy for You to Say"	Deborah Clifford, David Hodges	3:09
9.	"(Back to The) Heartbreak Kid"	Van Stephenson, Tim DuBois	3:09
10.	"God Ain't No Stained Glass Window"	Mark Germino	3:38

== Personnel ==
- Kathy Mattea – lead vocals, backing vocals, acoustic guitar
- David Briggs – acoustic piano
- Bobby Wood – acoustic piano
- Mark Casstevens – acoustic guitar
- Gregg Galbraith – acoustic guitar, electric guitar
- Jon Goin – electric guitar
- Chris Leuzinger – electric guitar
- Dale Sellers – electric lead guitar
- Sonny Garrish – pedal steel guitar
- Spady Brannan – bass
- Alan Rush – bass
- Gene Chrisman – drums
- Tommy Wells – drums
- Nashville String Machine – strings (2, 7)
- Bergen White – string arrangements (2, 7)
- Marcy Cates – backing vocals
- Margie Cates – backing vocals
- Wade McCurdy – backing vocals
- Pat McManus – backing vocals
- Curtis Young – backing vocals

== Production ==
- Byron Hill – producer
- Rick Peoples – producer
- George Clinton – engineer
- Jim Cotton – engineer
- Mike Poston – engineer
- Joe Scaife – engineer
- Tom Coyne – mastering at Frankford/Wayne Mastering Labs (New York City, New York)
- Bill Levy – art direction
- Bill Brunt – design
- Mark Tucker – photography
- Bob Titley – management

== Chart performance ==
Chart (1984)	Peak position
US Top Country Albums (Billboard)	42

== Release history ==
Release history and formats for Kathy Mattea
Region	Date	Format	Label	Ref.
North America	March 22, 1984	LP; CD; cassette	PolyGram; Mercury Records	
