= Someone Is Falling in Love =

Single by Kathy Mattea

from the album Kathy Mattea
- B-side: "That's Easy for You to Say"
- Released: January 1984
- Studio: Music Mill; Sound Emporium (Nashville, Tennessee)
- Genre: Country pop
- Length: 3:03
- Label: Mercury; PolyGram
- Songwriter(s): Lee Domann; Pebe Sebert
- Producer(s): Byron Hill; Rick Peoples

Kathy Mattea singles chronology
"Street Talk" (1983)	"Someone Is Falling in Love" (1984)	"You've Got a Soft Place to Fall" (1984)

"Someone Is Falling in Love" is a song written by Lee Domann and Pebe Sebert, and recorded by American country music artist, Kathy Mattea. It was released in January 1984 as the second single from her self-titled debut album. The song became Mattea's second single to reach the top 30 of the American country chart. .

== Background and recording ==
Kathy Mattea signed a recording contract with Mercury/PolyGram in 1983, releasing a series of singles that made the American country charts but failed to achieve top ten or top 20 status. Mattea would later break through in 1986 with "Love at the Five and Dime", along with a series of other top ten (and chart-topping) singles. Among her early single releases was 1984's "Someone Is Falling in Love". The song was written by Lee Domann and Pebe Sebert. The track was recorded the Music Mill and Sound Emporium studios, both located in Nashville, Tennessee. The sessions were produced by Byron Hill and Rick Peoples.

== Release, chart performance and reception ==
"Someone Is Falling in Love" was released by Mercury/PolyGram in January 1984 as a vinyl single. It was backed on the B-side by the song, "That's Easy for You to Say". "Someone Is Falling in Love" debuted on the American Billboard Hot Country Songs chart on February 25, 1984. It spent 16 weeks there and peaked at number 26 on April 28, 1984. It also reached the Billboard adult contemporary chart, peaking at number 23 around the same time frame. It then appeared on Mattea's debut studio album in 1984, which was titled Kathy Mattea.

== Track listing ==
7" vinyl single

- "Someone Is Falling in Love" – 3:03
- "That's Easy for You to Say" – 3:05

== Charts ==
Chart performance for "Someone Is Falling in Love"
Chart (1984)	Peak position
US Hot Adult Contemporary Tracks (Billboard)	23
US Hot Country Songs (Billboard)	26
