= It's Your Reputation Talkin' =

Single by Kathy Mattea

from the album From My Heart
- B-side: "Never Look Back"
- Released: January 1985
- Studio: Jack's Tracks (Nashville, Tennessee)
- Genre: Country pop
- Length: 2:45
- Label: Mercury; PolyGram
- Songwriters: Mitch Johnson; Harry Shannon
- Producer: Allen Reynolds

Kathy Mattea singles chronology
"God Ain't No Stained Glass Window" (1984)	"It's Your Reputation Talkin'" (1985)	"He Won't Give In" (1985)

"It's Your Reputation Talkin'" is a song written by Mitch Johnson and Harry Shannon, and recorded by American country music artist, Kathy Mattea. It was released in January 1985 as the lead single from her album From My Heart. The song became Mattea's third single to reach the top 40 of the American country chart.

== Background and recording ==
Kathy Mattea was considered among the country genre's most commercially-successful and respected artists during the eighties and nineties. However, Mattea was unsuccessful when she first began her recording career with Mercury/PolyGram in 1983. A series of singles from both her first and second album failed to reach the top 20 of the American country chart. Among her early singles was 1985's "It's Your Reputation Talkin'". The song was composed by Mitch Johnson and Harry Shannon. The track was recorded at Jack's Tracks, a studio located in Nashville, Tennessee. The session for the track was produced by Allen Reynolds.

== Release, chart performance and reception ==
"It's Your Reputation Talkin'" was released by Mercury/PolyGram in January 1985 as a vinyl single. It was backed on the B-side by the song, "Never Look Back". "It's Your Reputation Talkin'" entered the American Billboard Hot Country Songs chart on March 16, 1985. It spent 14 weeks there and peaked at number 34 on May 11, 1985. It became Mattea's third top 40 chart entry. It later appeared on Mattea's second studio album which was titled From My Heart.

== Track listing ==
7" vinyl single

- "It's Your Reputation Talkin'" – 2:45
- "Never Look Back" – 3:19

== Charts ==
Chart performance for "It's Your Reputation Talkin'"
Chart (1985)	Peak position
US Hot Country Songs (Billboard)	34
