= The Innocent Years =

Studio album by Kathy Mattea
- Released: May 16, 2000
- Studio: The Music Mill, Imagine Studios, Minnesota Man Studios, Javelina Studios, Emerald Sound Studios and The Sound Station (Nashville, Tennessee); Bailey Building & Loan Studio (Greenwich Village, New York)
- Genre: Contemporary country
- Length: 46:35
- Label: Mercury Nashville
- Producer: Kathy Mattea; Keith Stegall; Ben Wisch

Kathy Mattea chronology
Love Travels (1997)	The Innocent Years (2000)	Roses (2002)

Singles from The Innocent Years
- 1. "Trouble with Angels" Released: April 2000; 2. "BFD" Released: June 2000

The Innocent Years is a studio album by American country artist, Kathy Mattea. It was released on May 16, 2000, via Mercury Nashville and included 12 tracks of original material. It was the eleventh studio project of Mattea's career and her last with the Mercury Nashville label. The Innocent Years was a collection of songs that discussed Mattea's feelings associated with her father's failing health. Among its songs were the singles "The Trouble with Angels" and "BFD". The album received positive reviews from critics and made the American country albums chart.

== Background ==
Kathy Mattea was among the country genre's most popular recording artists during the eighties and nineties. A total of four singles topped the American country songs chart ("Goin' Gone", "Eighteen Wheels and a Dozen Roses", "Come from the Heart" and "Burnin' Old Memories") while a dozen more made the top ten or top 20. By the end of the nineties, Mattea had taken time off to care for her aging parents. She also turned 40 years old and was beginning to reconsider her professional outlook. She chose to make an album that reflected her recent experiences. "I realized that I had a chance to make this album from a different place. I thought, Life is so deep right now. I don't want to make a shallow record," she told the Chicago Tribune. Mattea also wanted to dedicate the album to her father as his life was coming to an end. She chose the title of The Innocent Years to reflect "the time when most of us are sheltered, taken care of". The album's cover photo was a photo of Mattea at age two.

== Recording and content ==
The Innocent Years was produced by Mattea herself, along with Ben Wisch. One track also featured production credits from Keith Stegall. The album consisted of 11 tracks, along with one bonus track. The second track, "The Trouble with Angels", described how God looks after people on Earth. The third track, "Why Can't We", reflected on people of Mattea's parents' generation and questioned what was learned from their lives. The ninth track, "That's the Deal", describes how a husband takes of her ailing wife who suffered a stroke. The album's bonus track, "BFD", describes a man who finds a new partner that provides him with the love and respect he needed. Finding that the song did not fit with the project's theme, Mattea chose to make it a "bonus track". Two recordings were co-written by Mattea herself: "Callin' My Name" (co-written with husband Jon Vezner) and the title track (also co-written with Vezner and Sally Barris).

== Critical reception ==
Professional ratings
Review scores
Source	Rating
AllMusic	3/5 stars

The Innocent Years gained a positive reception from critics and writers. Maria Konicki Dinoia of AllMusic gave it three out of five stars. She named both the title track and "Trouble with Angels" as "track picks" in her review. She also noted the album's use of ballads and how the concept reflected the "tender mercies of life". Eli Messinger of Country Standard Time wrote that, "Though the smooth sound and heart-on-her-sleeve lyrics may not be for the country roots fan (nor the cynically-minded, for that matter), Mattea's superb voice and mature readings are clearly the work of an accomplished artist chasing her musical muse." Dave McKenna of The Washington Post commented, "Kathy Mattea provides a pretty comprehensive primer on the downside of contemporary country with her new CD, The Innocent Years.

== Release, chart performance and singles ==
The Innocent Years was released on May 16, 2000 on Mercury Records Nashville. It was originally distributed as a compact disc and a cassette. It was Mattea's final album on the Mercury label before shifting towards independent record companies. It spent nine weeks on America's Billboard Top Country Albums chart, peaking at number 35 on June 3, 2000. In its first week, more than 4000 copies of the album were sold. Two singles were also spawned from the project. The first was the "Trouble with Angels", which was released by Mercury in April 2000. Spending eight weeks on the Billboard Hot Country Songs chart, it only peaked at number 53 in May 2000. "BFD" was then issued as the album's second single in June 2000. It spent only four weeks on the Billboard country songs chart, and peaked at number 63 in July 2000.

== Track listing ==
CD and digital versions
No.	Title	Writer(s)	Length
1.	"The Innocent Years"	Sally Barris; Kathy Mattea; Jon Vezner	3:56
2.	"Trouble with Angels"	Terry Wilson	4:35
3.	"Why Can't We"	Danny Orton; Russell Smith	4:13
4.	"Prove That by Me"	Jack Routh; Randy Sharp	4:57
5.	"Callin' My Name"	Barris; Mattea; Vezner	4:06
6.	"Out of the Blue"	Charlie Black; Carolyn Dawn Johnson	3:16
7.	"I Have Always Loved You"	Dan Hill; Tommy Lee James	4:29
8.	"(Love Is) My Last Word"	Shannon Brown; Monty Powell	3:56
9.	"Trust Me"	Vezner; Steve Wariner	4:54
10.	"That's the Deal"	Hugh Prestwood	3:55
11.	"The Innocent Years (Reprise)"	Barris; Mattea; Vezner	0:43
Total length:			46:35

Bonus track
No.	Title	Writer(s)	Length
12.	"BFD"	Craig Carothers; Don Henry	2:37

== Personnel ==
- Kathy Mattea – vocals, percussion (5)
- Matt Rollings – acoustic piano (1–3, 5–7, 9–11), organ (1, 3, 4, 8), Wurlitzer electric piano (12)
- Gary Prim – keyboards (2, 5, 7, 9, 10)
- Carson Whitsett – Hammond B3 organ (2)
- Carl Marsh – keyboards (5), string arrangements (5)
- Bill Cooley – acoustic guitar (1, 6), electric guitar (3)
- John Jennings – acoustic guitar (1, 3, 4, 6, 8, 12), baritone guitar (4), backpacker (4), electric guitar (8)
- Steve Sheehan – acoustic guitar (2, 5, 7, 9, 10)
- Brent Mason – electric guitar (2, 5, 7, 9, 10))
- Duke Levine – mandola (1, 4, 6, 8, 12), electric guitar (3, 4, 6, 8), acoustic guitar (8), electric slide guitar (8)
- Dan Dugmore – steel guitar (1, 3)
- Darrell Scott – steel guitar (6, 12)
- Stuart Duncan – bajo sexto (5), fiddle (8)
- James Hutchinson – bass (1, 3, 4, 8, 12)
- Glenn Worf – bass (2, 5, 7, 9, 10)
- Leland Sklar – bass (6)
- Abe Laboriel Jr. – drums (1, 3, 4, 8, 12), tambourine (4)
- Owen Hale – drums (2, 7, 9, 10)
- Jim Brock – drums (5)
- Shannon Forrest – drums (6)
- Eric Darken – percussion (2, 5, 9, 10)
- Chris Carmichael – fiddle (2), cello (5), viola (5), violin (5)
- Sam Bush – fiddle (8)
- Graham Nash – harmonica (4), harmony vocals (4)
- Jamshied Sharifi – wind synthesizer (4)
- John Mock – whistles (9)
- Wes Hightower – backing vocals (1, 7, 10)
- Bob Halligan Jr. – backing vocals (2, 8)
- Kim Richey – backing vocals (2, 8)
- John Thompson – backing vocals (2)
- Kevin Carroll – backing vocals (3)
- Nita Modley-Smith – backing vocals (3)
- Ira Wayne Settles – backing vocals (3)
- Odessa Settles – backing vocals (3)
- Shirley Settles – backing vocals (3)
- Tim Chewning – backing vocals (4–6), harmony vocals (9)
- Terry Wilson – backing vocals (4, 6)
- Alison Krauss – harmony vocal on second verse (6)
- Suzy Bogguss – backing vocals (7)
- Bob Bailey – backing vocals (9)
- Tim Wilson – backing vocals (11)
- Don Henry – backing vocals (12)

=== Production ===
- Kathy Mattea – producer, cover model
- Ben Wisch – producer (1, 3, 4, 6, 8, 9, 11, 12), recording (1, 3, 4, 6, 8, 9, 11, 12), mixing (1, 3, 4, 6, 8, 9, 11, 12), additional recording (1, 3, 4, 6, 8, 9, 11, 12)
- Keith Stegall – producer (2, 5, 7, 10)
- John Kelton – recording (2, 5, 7, 10), mixing (2, 5, 7, 10)
- Mick Conley – additional recording
- Mark Nevers – additional recording (2, 5, 7, 10), recording assistant (2, 5, 7, 10)
- Brady Barnett – recording assistant (1, 3, 4, 6, 8, 9, 11, 12), mix assistant (1, 3, 4, 6, 8, 9, 11, 12)
- Jim Skinner – recording assistant (1, 3, 4, 6, 8, 9, 11, 12)
- Jan Stolpe – mix assistant (2, 5, 7, 10)
- Matt Knobel – Pro Tools consultant (1, 3, 4, 6, 8, 9, 11, 12)
- Hank Williams – mastering at MasterMix (Nashville, Tennessee)
- Claudia Mize – A&R administrative director
- Buddy Jackson – art direction
- Jim Kemp – art direction
- Sally Carnes – design
- Jackson Design – design
- John Mattea – cover photography
- Russ Harrington – additional photography
- Jamie Kimmelman – stylist
- Melanie Shelley – hair, make-up
- Trim – make-up
- Titley/Spalding & Associates – management

== Chart performance ==
Chart (2000)	Peak position
US Top Country Albums (Billboard)	35

== Release history ==
Release history and formats for The Innocent Years
Region	Date	Format	Label	Ref.
Australia; Europe	May 16, 2000	CD	Mercury Records Nashville	
North America	May 16, 2000	CD; cassette	Mercury Records Nashville	
North America	2000s	Digital download	Mercury Nashville Records	
