= From My Heart =

Studio album by Kathy Mattea
- Released: January 1985
- Recorded: 1984
- Studio: Jack's Tracks (Nashville, Tennessee)
- Genre: Country
- Length: 30:05
- Label: Mercury
- Producer: Allen Reynolds

Kathy Mattea chronology
Kathy Mattea (1984)	From My Heart (1985)	Walk the Way the Wind Blows (1986)

Singles from From My Heart
- 1. "It's Your Reputation Talkin'" Released: January 1985; 2. "He Won't Give In" Released: May 1985; 3. "Heart of the Country" Released: September 1985

Professional ratings
Review scores
Source	Rating
AllMusic	3.5/5 stars
The Rolling Stone Album Guide	3/5 stars

From My Heart is the second studio album by American country music singer Kathy Mattea. It was released in 1985 on Mercury Records. Singles from the album include "It's Your Reputation Talkin'", "He Won't Give In" and "Heart of the Country". Like her self-titled debut before it, From My Heart peaked at #42 on the Top Country Albums charts. "Ball and Chain" is a cover of an Elton John song, from his 1982 album Jump Up!.

== Track listing ==
No.	Title	Writer(s)	Length
1.	"It's Your Reputation Talkin'"	Mitch Johnson, Harry Shannon	2:45
2.	"I Believe I Could Fall in Love (With Loving You)"	Gary Burr	2:44
3.	"Trail of Tears"	Roger Cook, Allen Reynolds	3:30
4.	"Never Look Back"	Tom Campbell, Jim Photoglo, Wendy Waldman	3:19
5.	"Heart of the Country"	Donny Lowery, Waldman	3:56
6.	"Ball and Chain"	Elton John, Gary Osborne	2:58
7.	"When I'm over You (What You Gonna Do)"	Mark Germino, Chuck Kuening	3:17
8.	"Talkin' to Myself"	Richard Allen, Frank Saulino, Jim Valentini	2:16
9.	"He Won't Give In"	Johnny Pierce	2:28
10.	"If I Hadn't Met You"	Randy Goodrum	2:52

== Personnel ==
- Kathy Mattea – lead vocals, backing vocals

Musicians

- Charles Cochran – acoustic piano, organ
- John Barlow Jarvis – acoustic piano
- Hargus "Pig" Robbins – acoustic piano, organ
- Bobby Wood – organ
- Mark Casstevens – acoustic guitar
- Chris Leuzinger – acoustic guitar, electric guitar
- Brent Rowan – electric guitar
- Sonny Garrish – steel guitar
- Mike Stanton – steel guitar
- Bob Wray – bass
- Milton Sledge – drums

String quartet on "If I Hadn't Met You"

- Charles Cochran – string arrangements
- Roy Christensen – cello
- Gary Vanosdale – viola
- George Binkley – violin
- Carl Gorodetzky – violin

Singers

- Jonathan Edwards – backing vocals
- Mac McAnally – backing vocals
- Pat McManus – backing vocals
- Jim Photoglo – backing vocals
- Allen Reynolds – backing vocals
- John Thompson – backing vocals
- Wendy Waldman – backing vocals

== Production ==
- Allen Reynolds – producer
- Mark Miller – engineer, mixing
- Duke Duczer – assistant engineer, mix assistant
- John Eberle – mastering at Nashville Record Productions (Nashville, Tennessee)
- Barnes & Company – album graphics
- Bill Barnes – art direction
- Deb Mahalanobis – design, hand lettering
- Jim "Señor" McGuire – photography
- Darlene Hill – hairstyle
- Pat Barnes – make-up
- Bob Titley – management

== Chart performance ==
Chart (1985)	Peak position
US Top Country Albums (Billboard)	42

== Release history ==
Release history and formats for From My Heart
Region	Date	Format	Label	Ref.
North America	March 3, 1985	LP; CD; cassette	PolyGram; Mercury Records	
