= He Won't Give In =

Single by Kathy Mattea

from the album From My Heart
- B-side: "I Believe I Could Fall In Love (With Loving You)"
- Released: May 1985
- Studio: Jack's Tracks (Nashville, Tennessee)
- Genre: Country pop
- Length: 2:28
- Label: Mercury; PolyGram
- Songwriter(s): Johnny Pierce
- Producer(s): Allen Reynolds

Kathy Mattea singles chronology
"It's Your Reputation Talkin'" (1985)	"He Won't Give In" (1985)	"Heart of the Country" (1985)

"He Won't Give In" is a song written by Johnny Pierce, and recorded by American country music artist, Kathy Mattea. It was released in May 1985 as the second single from her album From My Heart. The song was Mattea's fourth single to reach the top 40 of the American country chart.

== Background and recording ==
Before reaching commercial success with 1986's Walk the Way the Wind Blows (which spawned four top ten singles), Kathy Mattea recorded two studio albums with PolyGram/Mercury that produced several unsuccessful (but charting) singles. Among her early singles was 1985's "He Won't Give In". The song was composed by Johnny Pierce. The track was recorded at Jack's Tracks, a studio located in Nashville, Tennessee. The session for the track was produced by Allen Reynolds.

== Release, chart performance and reception ==
"He Won't Give In" was released by Mercury/PolyGram in May 1985 as a vinyl single. It was backed on the B-side by the song, "I Believe I Could Fall In Love (With Loving You)". The single debuted on the American Billboard Hot Country Songs chart on July 6, 1985. It spent 19 weeks there and peaked at number 22 on September 14, 1985. It became Mattea's fourth top 40 chart entry on the country songs list. It later appeared on Mattea's second studio album which was titled From My Heart.

== Track listing ==
7" vinyl single

- "He Won't Give In" – 2:28
- "I Believe I Could Fall In Love (With Loving You)" – 2:44

== Charts ==
Chart performance for "He Won't Give In"
Chart (1985)	Peak position
US Hot Country Songs (Billboard)	22
