= Coal (Kathy Mattea album) =

Studio album by Kathy Mattea
- Released: April 1, 2008
- Studio: House of David, Puremusic Studio, The Playground Recording Studios and Cryptic Globe (Nashville, Tennessee); Cave 2 Studio (Atlanta, Georgia)
- Genre: Country; bluegrass
- Length: 43:15
- Label: Captain Potato; Thirty Tigers
- Producer: Marty Stuart

Kathy Mattea chronology
Right Out of Nowhere (2005)	Coal (2008)	Calling Me Home (2012)

Coal is an album by American country artist Kathy Mattea. It was released on April 1, 2008, via Captain Potato Records and Thirty Tigers. The album consisted of 11 tracks, all of which were stemmed from themes of coal mining in the Appalachian region of the United States. A majority of the album's material were covers of songs previously recorded by other singer-songwriters such as Hazel Dickens and Jean Ritchie. Coal received several positive reviews from critics at the time of its release. It was also Mattea's first album to top the American bluegrass chart and was nominated by the Grammy Awards.

== Background ==
Mattea's decision to make an album about this topic was influenced by the fact that both of her grandfathers were miners, as well as by the Sago Mine disaster in 2006, which, when it occurred, reminded Mattea of the Farmington Mine disaster that had occurred when she was nine years old. She has said that she was expecting a set of stories in the songs she covered on this album, but instead found a connection to her miner ancestors. Her deep interest in this topic was also noted by the album's producer, Marty Stuart.

Similar interest took place with the recording the a cappella song "Black Lung". Stuart said it would be like "trying to repaint the 'Mona Lisa'", in that it requires authentic commitment to the task. Mattea also stated that it was so difficult for her to learn the song that it took her six months to do so. Nevertheless, the first recording of Mattea's version of the song ended up being kept after it made the recording engineer, whose father had died of black lung disease, cry. Stuart reacted by telling Mattea that this was a sign she was performing the song right.

== Recording and content ==
Coal was made at four different recording studios: Cave 2, House of David, Puremusic and The Playground. The project was produced by Marty Stuart. He was suggested to produce the project from one of Mattea's friends. Stuart told Mattea that she would have to fully invest in the album's material if she was going to "pull it off". Nine months later, Mattea showcased her material for Stuart who approved. "It was like the biggest gold star I could have gotten," she recalled to CMT. Featured on the album were fellow artists Mollie O'Brien, Tim O'Brien and Patty Loveless.

Coal consisted of 11 tracks, most of which were covers of coal mining songs. Many of the album's songs were "more than half a century old", according to USA Today. Among the album's older material is Merle Travis's "Dark as a Dungeon". Newer recordings about coal-mining included Darrell Scott's "You'll Never Leave Harlan Alive". Most of the album's material came from the pen of three writers: Hazel Dickens, Jean Ritchie and Billy Ed Wheeler. All three singer-songwriters had roots built in West Virginia. Among them was the track, "Black Lung", which was about Dickens's brother who suffered from black lung disease.

== Critical reception ==
Professional ratings
Review scores
Source	Rating
About.com	5/5 stars
Allmusic	4/5 stars
American Songwriter	3/5 stars
Los Angeles Times	3.5/4 stars
PopMatters	8/10 stars
Robert Christgau	(2-star Honorable Mention)
Slant Magazine	4.5/5 stars

The album received several favorable reviews, including five stars from About.com's Scott Sexton, who wrote that Mattea brings the album's songs to life and that "you can actually imagine all of these stories in your mind while she is singing." In a more mixed review, Grant Alden wrote in No Depression that Coal was "a complicated conversation, one she seeks gently to engage all of us in," and praised her cover of "Red-Winged Black Bird" as the album's best song. He also criticized her treatment of "Coming of the Roads" as "prosaic" and wrote that she added nothing to the Merle Travis song "Dark as a Dungeon".

Coal was given four out of five stars from AllMusic's Steve Leggett. "Coal won't fill the dancefloors but it will fill the heart with hope and remind that even in the darkest times and places, there's a song worth singing, and those songs, the ones that emerge from the bleakest situations, may well be ones we need the most," he concluded. In 2009, Country Universe named Coal number five on their "The 100 Greatest Albums of the Decade."

Steve Horowitz of PopMatters gave the project an 8/10 rating. Horowitz called the album "terrific", highlighting the production and Mattea's vocals. "The real question is, despite Mattea’s good intentions and impeccable credentials, is the album any good? The answer is a definite yes," he added. Jonathan Keefe of Slant Magazine gave the album 4.5 out of five stars, calling it "her most ambitious work". Keefe concluded by saying that Coal "is easily one of both Mattea’s and 2008’s best albums."

== Release and chart performance ==
Coal was released on April 1, 2008, on Captain Potato Records in conjunction with the Thirty Tigers label. It was originally released as both a compact disc and as a digital download. The project was the first issued on Mattea's own label (Captain Potato). It spent four weeks on the American Billboard Top Country Albums chart, peaking at number 64 on April 19, 2008. It also topped the Bluegrass Albums Chart and was nominated for a Grammy Award. The album spent two weeks at number one Billboard's Top Bluegrass Albums chart and was her first album to make the chart.

== Track listing ==
CD and digital versions
No.	Title	Writer(s)	Length
1.	"The L&N Don't Stop Here Anymore"	Jean Ritchie	4:11
2.	"Blue Diamond Mines"	Jean Ritchie	4:59
3.	"Red-Winged Blackbird"	Billy Edd Wheeler	2:53
4.	"Lawrence Jones"	Si Kahn	3:04
5.	"Green Rolling Hills"	Alice Gerrard, Hazel Dickens, Bruce "Utah" Phillips	3:45
6.	"Coal Tattoo"	Wheeler	3:17
7.	"Sally in the Garden"	Trad.	0:44
8.	"You'll Never Leave Harlan Alive"	Darrell Scott	5:02
9.	"Dark as a Dungeon"	Merle Travis	4:34
10.	"Coming of the Roads"	Wheeler	4:38
11.	"Black Lung/Coal"	Dickens	6:08
12.	"Bonus Tracks"
13.	"Harlan, by Judith Edelman"
Total length:			43:15

== Personnel ==
All credits are adapted from the liner notes of Coal and AllMusic.

Musical personnel

- Kathy Mattea – vocals, acoustic guitar (2, 5)
- Eric Fritch – Hammond organ (1, 9)
- Randy Leago – accordion (8), acoustic piano (9)
- Bill Cooley – acoustic guitar (1–6, 8–11)
- Marty Stuart – acoustic guitar (1, 3–5, 8–11), mandolin (1, 2, 4–6, 8, 9, 11), harmony vocals (2), mandocello (3), electric guitar (9)
- Stuart Duncan – banjo (1, 2, 6, 7), fiddle (1–4, 6, 11), acoustic guitar (4), mandocello (9)
- Fred Newell – pedal steel guitar (8)
- Byron House – double bass (1–6, 8–11)
- John Catchings – cello (10)
- Patty Loveless – harmony vocals (2)
- Mollie O'Brien – harmony vocals (5)
- Tim O'Brien – harmony vocals (5)

Production personnel

- Marty Stuart – producer
- Mick Conley – recording, mixing
- Dan Spomer – overdub recording, vocal engineer
- Charley Hubbs – recording assistant
- Jim DeMain – mastering at Yes Master (Nashville, Tennessee)
- Maria Elena Orbea – production coordinator
- Kimberly Levitan – design
- James Minchin – photography
- Homer Hickam – liner notes
- Marc Dottore with Dottore-DuBois Artist Management – management

== Accolades ==
Year	Nominee / work	Award	Result	Ref.
2009	51st Annual Grammy Awards	Best Traditional Folk Album for Coal	Nominated	

== Charts ==
Chart (2008)	Peak position
US Top Bluegrass Albums (Billboard)	1
US Top Country Albums (Billboard)	64

== Release history ==
Release history and formats for Coal
Region	Date	Format	Label	Ref.
North America	April 1, 2008	CD; music download	Captain Potato Records; Thirty Tigers	
