= Roses (Kathy Mattea album) =

Studio album by Kathy Mattea
- Released: July 30, 2002
- Studio: Playground Recording Studios, Minnesota Man Studios and Mick's Mix (Nashville, Tennessee); Ed's (Franklin, Tennessee)
- Genre: Country; Celtic folk pop
- Length: 45:28
- Label: Narada
- Producer: Ed Cash; Kathy Mattea

Kathy Mattea chronology
The Innocent Years (2000)	Roses (2002)	Joy for Christmas Day (2003)

Singles from Roses
- 1. "They Are the Roses" Released: July 19, 2002

Roses is a studio album by American country artist, Kathy Mattea. It was released on July 30, 2002, via Narada Productions and was the twelfth studio project of her career. The album contained 12 tracks of original material that featured a Celtic-folk sound that was considered a departure from Mattea's previous works. It was also Mattea's first album following her exit from her longtime country label, Mercury/PolyGram. The album received mixed reviews from critics upon its release. One single was issued from the project and the album reached the top 40 of the American country albums chart.

== Background ==
According to writer, Steve Huey, Kathy Mattea was considered among the most commercially successful and respected country artists of her era. By 2002, Kathy Mattea had placed 18 singles in the top ten of the American country songs chart and won two Country Music Association Awards. After turning 40 years old, Mattea was ready to take a new direction in her professional life. She released one final album with her long-time label (Mercury/PolyGram) in 2000 called The Innocent Years. She then explored various Nashville labels, but decided it was time to explore other opportunities. Mattea instead signed with the Virgin Records subsidiary label, Narada, in 2002. Mattea was ready to experiment with other styles outside of her country roots, which prompted the development of Roses. She had been a fan of Celtic music for many years and was ready to make an album that honored that style. She described the project as "contemporary folk with a Celtic twist."

== Recording and content ==
Roses was recorded at the Playground Recording Studios and was co-produced by Ed Cash and Mattea herself. A total of 12 tracks comprised the album project. Of them, two tracks were penned by Mattea: "Come Away with Me" and "The Slender Threads That Bind Us Here" (both co-written with Marcus Hummon). In describing the choice of material Mattea told the Chicago Tribune, "The songs I record have to ask some kind of [positive] question or have some kind of positive vision." Among the album's tracks was "Ashes in the Wind", which alluded to the death of a high school classmate. Another track, "Who We Are", centers around a turbulent mother-daughter relationship. Mattea also covered Kim Richey's original tune, "I'm Alright". The musical sound of the project was described by The Washington Post as "Celtic folk pop", while AllMusic found it to have a "Scottish/Irish" sound.

== Release, singles, and critical reception ==
Professional ratings
Review scores
Source	Rating
AllMusic	2.5/5 stars

Roses was released on July 30, 2002, on Narada Productions and marked the twelfth studio album of Mattea's career. The disc was issued as a compact disc. It was later issued to digital sites, including Apple Music. Roses spent six weeks on the American Billboard Top Country Albums chart, peaking at number 38 in August 2002. It is Mattea's final album to date that has reached a top 40 position on the country albums chart. One single was spawned from the project: "They Are the Roses". According to Billboard, the song was intended to be released to adult contemporary radio, not country radio (unlike her previous releases). "They Are the Roses" was officially released on July 19, 2002, to Americana (Triple A) radio.

The album received mixed reviews upon its release. Maria Konicki Dinoia of AllMusic gave the project 2.5 stars out of five, but praised the project in her writing of her review: "This album isn't the country music of the former Grammy-winner and CMA vocalist of the year, but it wins high marks for creative expression and originality." Geoffrey Himes of The Washington Post described the production of some selections to have a "lush arrangement", but was more critical of Mattea's vocal performance, "Only three of the dozen songs are strong enough to remind us how effective Mattea's invitingly personal soprano can be with the right material," Himes noted.

== Track listing ==
CD and digital versions
No.	Title	Writer(s)	Length
1.	"That's All the Lumber You Sent"	Rick Cua; Bob Halligan Jr.; Linda Halligan	4:22
2.	"They Are the Roses"	Paul Jenkins; Tim Schoepf; Randy VanWarmer	3:58
3.	"Guns of Love"	Michael Caruso; John Keller; Randy Sharp	3:34
4.	"Ashes in the Wind"	Jon Vezner	4:37
5.	"I'm Alright"	Larry Gottlieb; Angelo Petraglia; Kim Richey	4:13
6.	"Till I Turn to You"	Jessi Alexander; Gary Nicholson	4:50
7.	"Come Away with Me"	Marcus Hummon; Kathy Mattea	3:43
8.	"Who We Are"	Beth Nielsen Chapman; Allen Shamblin	4:04
9.	"Junkyard"	B. Halligan Jr.; L. Halligan	4:08
10.	"Isle Of Inishmore - Part 1 (Air)"	Bill Cooley	2:04
11.	"Isle Of Inishmore - Part 2 (Jig)"	Cooley	2:18
12.	"The Slender Threads That Bind Us Here"	Hummon; Mattea	3:35
Total length:			45:28

== Personnel ==
All credits are adapted from the liner notes of Roses and AllMusic.

Musical personnel

- Kathy Mattea – vocals, foot stomps (1), guitars (10, 11), whistle (10, 11)
- Mark Stallings – acoustic piano (1–4, 6–9, 12), Hammond B3 organ (3, 5, 8)
- Tim Lauer – accordion (1, 12)
- Carson Whitsett – acoustic piano (10, 11)
- Ed Cash – acoustic guitar (1–3, 5–9), banjo (1), mandolin (1, 3, 5, 8), hand jive (1), backing vocals (1–3, 5–8, 12), synthesizers (2), electric guitar (2, 5, 7), percussion (3, 7, 8), Fender Rhodes (5), harmonica (5), Ebow (6), Hammond B3 organ (7)
- Bill Cooley – acoustic guitar (10, 11), classical guitar (12)
- David Johnson – dobro (6), steel guitar (8)
- Byron House – acoustic bass (1, 4), bass (2, 3, 5, 7–9), upright bass (6, 12)
- Tommy Sims – electric bass (1)
- Gerry Gillespie – bass (10, 11)
- Dan Needham – drums (1–3, 6–9), percussion (1, 3, 8), hand jive (1)
- Jim Brock – percussion (1–3, 5, 9–11), drums (10, 11)
- Chris Carmichael – fiddle (1), violin (10, 11)
- John Mock – whistle (1, 7), concertina (10, 11), harmonium (10, 11)
- Joanie Madden – whistle (4, 12)
- David Angell – strings (4)
- John Catchings – strings (4)
- David Davidson – strings (4)
- Pamela Sixfin – strings (4)
- Kris Thompson – strings (4)
- Carl Marsh – string arrangements (4)
- Bob Halligan Jr. – harmony vocals (1)
- Dave Barnes – backing vocals (2, 12), pub scene production (12)
- Bebo Norman – harmony vocals (6)

Production personnel

- Ed Cash – producer
- Kathy Mattea – co-producer
- Mick Conley – recording, overdub engineer, mix engineer
- B.J. Aberle – assistant engineer (1–9, 12)
- Christopher Diehl – assistant engineer (10, 11)
- Trevor Sadler – mastering at Narada Productions, Inc. (Milwaukee, Wisconsin)
- Connie Gage – design
- Russ Harrington – photography

== Chart performance ==
Chart (2002)	Peak position
US Top Country Albums (Billboard)	38

== Release history ==
Region	Date	Format	Label	Ref.
North America	July 30, 2002	Compact disc	Narada Productions	
North America	2000s	Digital	Narada Productions	
