= Kathy Mattea =

American musician, activist (born 1959)

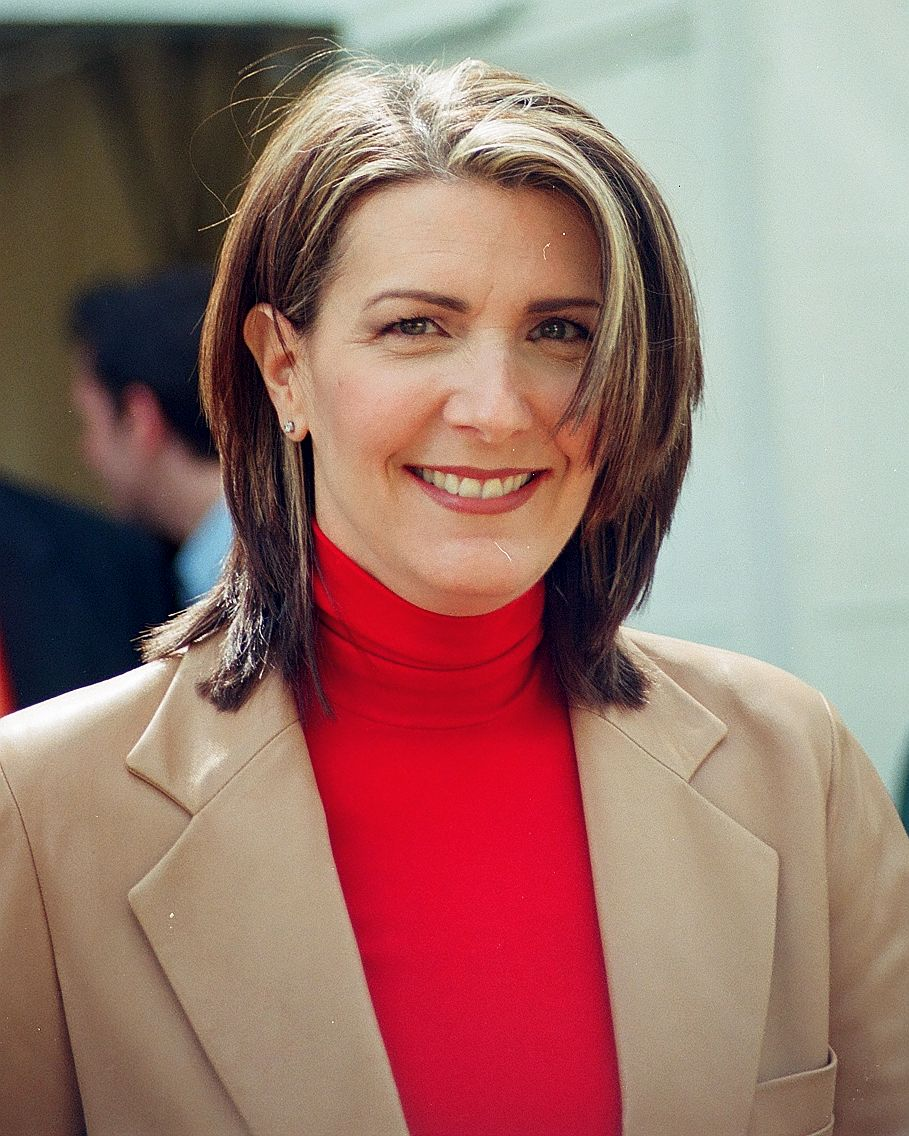
- Mattea in 2000
- Born: Kathleen Alice Mattea; June 21, 1959 (age 67); South Charleston, West Virginia, U.S.
- Education: West Virginia University
- Occupations: Singer; songwriter; producer
- Years active: 1983–present
- Spouse: Jon Vezner (m. 1988)
- Awards: Full list
- Musical career
- Genres: Country; country folk; bluegrass
- Instruments: Vocals; guitar
- Labels: Mercury Nashville; Narada; Captain Potato; Sugar Hill; Thirty Tigers
- Website: mattea.com

Kathleen Alice Mattea (born June 21, 1959) is an American country music and bluegrass singer. Active since 1984 as a recording artist, she has charted more than 30 singles on the Billboard Hot Country Songs charts, including four that reached No. 1: "Goin' Gone", "Eighteen Wheels and a Dozen Roses", "Come from the Heart", and "Burnin' Old Memories", and 12 more that charted within the top ten. She has released 15 studio albums, two Christmas albums, and one greatest hits album. Most of her material was recorded for Universal Music Group Nashville's Mercury Records Nashville division between 1984 and 2000, with later albums being issued on Narada Productions, her own Captain Potato label, and Sugar Hill Records. Among her albums, she has received five gold certifications and one platinum certification from the Recording Industry Association of America (RIAA). She has collaborated with Dolly Parton, Michael McDonald, Tim O'Brien, and her husband, Jon Vezner. Mattea is also a two-time Grammy Award winner: in 1990 for "Where've You Been", and in 1993 for her Christmas album Good News. Her style is defined by traditional country, bluegrass, folk, and Celtic music influences. She was inducted into the Grand Ole Opry in 2025.

== Early life ==
Kathleen Alice Mattea was born June 21, 1959, in South Charleston, West Virginia. She and two brothers grew up in nearby Cross Lanes. Her father worked in a chemical plant, and her mother was a homemaker. During her childhood, Mattea's mother would encourage her to perform informal piano recitals for family and friends. She also sang in the church choir as a child, and in high school she performed at school shows and family gatherings. Mattea also began playing guitar in her teen years after discovering folk music. In addition to folk, Mattea also took an interest in bluegrass, which she would later say formed her roots as an artist. She joined a bluegrass band in 1976 while attending West Virginia University. After a songwriter friend graduated and began to pursue a career in Nashville, Tennessee, Mattea decided to drop out of school and go with him. Her friend soon left Nashville in hopes of pursuing medical school, but Mattea chose to stay behind. She worked as a tour guide at the Country Music Hall of Fame, and then as a secretary and a waitress, to support herself while working as a demo singer. Songwriter, publisher, and record producer Byron Hill discovered her and helped her sign to Mercury Records in 1983.

== Career ==
=== 1984–1986: First two albums ===
Mattea's self-titled debut album came out in 1984, with Hill and Rick Peoples as the album's producers. Mattea later noted that "there were no budgets" when she was recording the album, as she was unable to afford a $75 makeup session, and the front cover featured her wearing a jacket which she had purchased at Kmart. In addition, Mattea was given advice from image consultants on her musical persona. According to Mattea, she did not have an "artistic vision" at the time, which accounted for a lack of artistic identity.

Four of its singles made the Hot Country Songs charts, starting with "Street Talk", which charted at number 25. Mattea had originally recorded a demo of the song with the intent of having Terri Gibbs record it, but Mattea kept it for herself when Gibbs declined the song. Followup "Someone Is Falling in Love" (written by Pebe Sebert) made it to number 26 on the same chart, while "You've Got a Soft Place to Fall" and "That's Easy for You to Say" fell short of the top 40. Other notable cuts on the album included "God Ain't No Stained Glass Window", which was released as a 12" promotional single for the Christmas season; a cover version of Barry Manilow's 1981 hit "Somewhere Down the Road"; and "(Back to the) Heartbreak Kid", which later became a Top 10 hit on the country charts for Restless Heart in late 1985 to early 1986. AllMusic reviewer William Ruhlmann wrote of the album that it was "a fairly representative sampling of Nashville formula country writing", while praising the "feisty" nature of "Street Talk" and Mattea's vocals on "Heartbreak Kid". People reviewer Ralph Novak compared Mattea's voice favorably to Anne Murray and said that "Mattea may not have the most revolutionary sound around, but her material is especially good."

Her second album, From My Heart, was also her first under the production of Allen Reynolds, who is best known for his work with Crystal Gayle and Garth Brooks. Released in 1985, it produced the chart singles "It's Your Reputation Talkin'", "He Won't Give In", and "Heart of the Country", which peaked at numbers 34, 22, and 46 respectively on Hot Country Songs. It also featured a cover of Elton John's "Ball and Chain", from his 1982 album Jump Up! Ruhlmann found this album superior to its predecessor, stating that Reynolds "seems to have shaped the song selections to the singer's talents and given her the opportunity to sing in a more individual manner." A review of the album in Billboard was also positive, noting the "more focused direction and a simpler, purer sound".

=== 1986–1990: Breakthrough ===
Mattea's artistic vision developed with the making of her third album, which brought in folk and acoustic sounds (inspired by her childhood). Her third album, Walk the Way the Wind Blows (1986) was (according to AllMusic) "her breakthrough both critically and commercially". Four singles were released from the album. First was "Love at the Five and Dime", written and originally recorded by Nanci Griffith on her 1986 album The Last of the True Believers. Following it was the title track, "You're the Power", and "Train of Memories". All four of these songs reached the top ten of the country music charts between 1986 and 1987. Contributing musicians on Walk the Way the Wind Blows included Béla Fleck, Don Williams (who sang background vocals on "Love at the Five and Dime"), Wendy Waldman, and Vince Gill. Billboard praised Walk the Way the Wind Blows as "Mattea's most country effort to date". An un-credited review in Stereo Review (now Sound & Vision) stated that "if every country album were as tasteful and well executed as Walk the Way the Wind Blows...the reviewer's life would be a happy one indeed", while rating the performance and recording as "perfection". Thom Jurek felt that the album's uptempo cuts were stronger than its ballads, noting that "Her ballad singing hadn't gotten to the place it did just three years later" while praising her performances on the more upbeat tracks and on "Love at the Five and Dime".

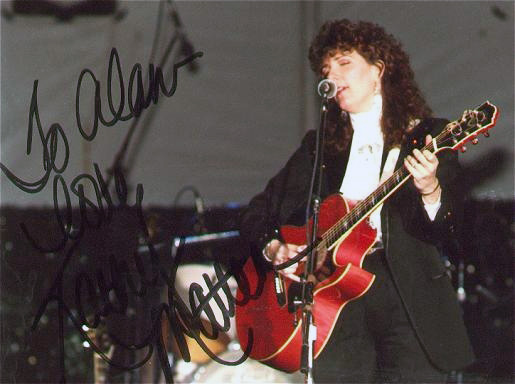
An autographed photo of Mattea live in concert, 1989.

Mattea had her first number one single in late 1987 to early 1988 with "Goin' Gone". Co-written by Pat Alger and Fred Koller, this song was also previously recorded by Griffith on the same album as "Love at the Five and Dime". Mattea's version was the lead single to her fourth album Untasted Honey. Following it was "Eighteen Wheels and a Dozen Roses", which became her longest-tenured number one single when it spent two weeks in that position. "Untold Stories" and "Life as We Knew It" were also released from the album, with both reaching the number four position of the country charts. The album also featured bluegrass musician Tim O'Brien, who wrote both "Walk the Way the Wind Blows" and "Untold Stories", as a duet partner on the track "The Battle Hymn of Love". Jurek noted the album's bluegrass influences with favor, while comparing "Untold Stories" to the work of Bill Monroe and praising the lyrics of "Eighteen Wheels and a Dozen Roses". People magazine's review of the album stated that "it’s just Mattea, sounding warm, strong, smart and generally splendid," also commending the lyrical storytelling of "Life as We Knew It" and "Eighteen Wheels and a Dozen Roses".

In 1989, she released Willow in the Wind. This album's first two singles, "Come from the Heart" (previously recorded by Don Williams on his 1987 album Traces) and "Burnin' Old Memories", also topped the country charts. After it came the top-ten Hot Country Songs songs "Where've You Been" (co-written by Mattea's husband, Jon Vezner) and "She Came from Fort Worth", the latter of which was a number one single on the Radio & Records and Gavin Report country music charts. This album featured backing vocals from Craig Bickhardt, Riders in the Sky, Jim Photoglo, and Claire Lynch, with musical contributions from Mark O'Connor, Charlie McCoy, Jerry Douglas, and Ray Flacke. Jurek called it "the first completely realized project of her career", and highlighted Laurie Lewis's "Love Chooses You" as its strongest cut. An uncredited review from People was positive, stating that "she’s still not one to rock and roll, but this album has a fair share of swingy, blue-newgrass tracks", and that "Mattea sounds warm and relaxed". Comparing Mattea's vocals to Linda Ronstadt and Jennifer Warnes, Randy Lewis of the Los Angeles Times wrote that "she treats the songs, most of which are about lives in transition, with the requisite humility and honesty so their simple charms are not inflated into stentorian Author's Messages". Mattea won the Country Music Association's Female Vocalist of the Year award in both 1989 and 1990, and a Grammy Award for Best Female Country Vocal Performance in 1990 for "Where've You Been".

=== 1990–1993: Continued success ===
Later in 1990, Mattea released her first greatest hits album, A Collection of Hits. The album included eight of her previous singles, plus "The Battle Hymn of Love" from Untasted Honey and the new recording "A Few Good Things Remain". Both were released as singles in 1990 and reached the Top 10 of Hot Country Songs, with "The Battle Hymn of Love" representing O'Brien's only chart entry to date. "A Few Good Things Remain" was also featured on her next studio album, 1991's Time Passes By. This project produced three singles: the title track reached the top ten, but "Whole Lotta Holes" and "Asking Us to Dance" were less successful. The album included Celtic music influences and was partially recorded in Scotland. Reynolds continued to serve as producer for this album except for the closing track, a cover of "From a Distance", which Mattea and Vezner produced with Dougie MacLean. Contributors on backing vocals included Trisha Yearwood (on "Time Passes By"), The Roches (on "Whole Lotta Holes"), Emmylou Harris, Craig Bickhardt, and Ashley Cleveland. Rating it "A", Alanna Nash of Entertainment Weekly called the album "a quiet, reflective acoustic collection." Brian Mansfield noted in Allmusic that it was "her most ambitious album" and had "impeccably chosen songs".

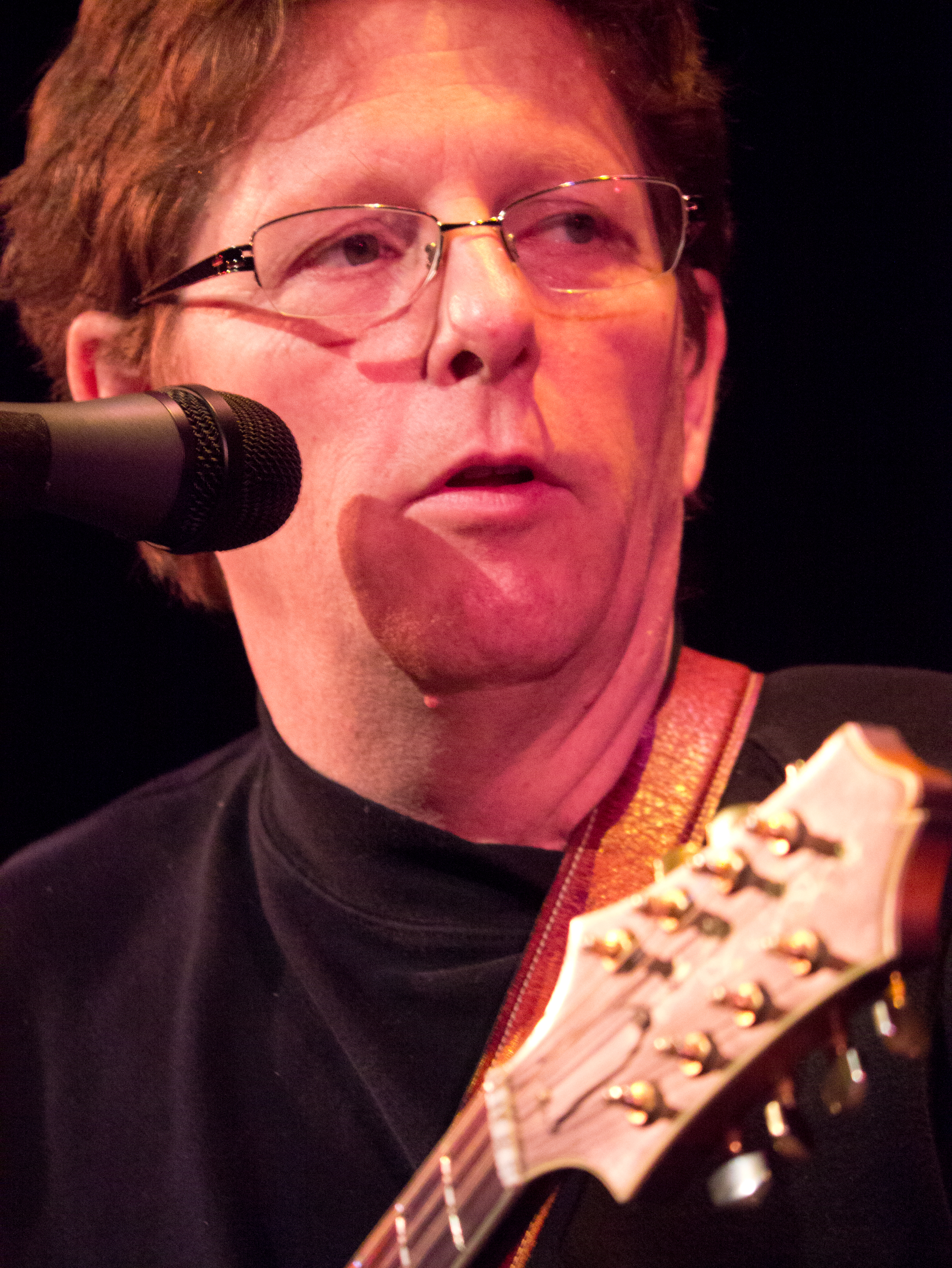
Tim O'Brien sang duet vocals on Mattea's 1990 single "The Battle Hymn of Love".

Her 1992 album, Lonesome Standard Time, produced a number 11 country hit in its title track, plus the Top 20 "Standing Knee Deep in a River (Dying of Thirst)". Yet its followups ("Seeds" and "Listen to the Radio") failed to enter the country top 40. This was also her first album to be produced by Brent Maher, best known for his work with The Judds. Nash rated it "B", saying that "not even the driving bluegrass of the title tune is enough to transcend the album’s ultrareflective mood. Mattea’s husky mezzo-soprano remains a thrilling instrument, however". CD Review noted that the album seemed "familiar" despite the change in producers and session musicians: "a couple of whimsical numbers, a couple of bluesy laments for love gone wrong, a let's-get-away-from-it-all love song" while praising the lyrical content of "Standing Knee Deep in a River" and "Seeds". In June 1992, Mattea experienced a burst blood vessel on her vocals. She was required to undergo vocal rest and surgery to "repair years of overuse" on her vocal cords.

After recovering, she issued her first Christmas album, Good News, in September 1993. It featured largely original compositions, plus renditions of the hymn "Brightest and Best" and the contemporary Christian tune "Mary, Did You Know?" Thom Jurek wrote of its sound, "This doesn't feel like any Christmas record you've ever heard before...It sounds like a well-crafted, gorgeously wrought folk/country/Celtic-flavored Kathy Mattea record." This album won that year's Grammy Award for Best Southern, Country or Bluegrass Gospel Album. Maher again served as producer, with further production from Reynolds on one track.

=== 1994–2000: Later years with Mercury ===
Mattea released Walking Away a Winner in 1994. Produced by Josh Leo, the album was more rock and pop influenced than its predecessors, with Thom Jurek of Allmusic comparing its sound to Mary Chapin Carpenter and Bonnie Raitt. Nash noted the "bigger" sound of the album, but praised its "style and substance". The title track charted at number three on the country charts in 1994. It was followed by "Nobody's Gonna Rain on Our Parade", "Maybe She's Human", and "Clown in Your Rodeo". The album featured backing vocals from Lisa Angelle, Karla Bonoff, Andrew Gold, and Hal Ketchum. Also in 1994, Mattea had a cameo in the movie Maverick, whose soundtrack also featured her as one of several lead vocalists on a multi-artist rendition of "Amazing Grace".

Mattea spent the entirety of 1996 off the charts before returning with Love Travels in 1997. Its lead single was "455 Rocket", which reached number 21. It was followed by the title track, which reached the top 40. Mattea noted that in the process of recording "455 Rocket," the band recorded multiple takes but chose to keep the first one because "no one thought they were being recorded, and everyone was just playing with abandon." Musicians on this album included bassist Hutch Hutchinson, drummers Abe Laboriel Jr. and Jim Keltner, and guitarist Duke Levine; contributing backing vocalists included Kim Richey, Michael McDonald, Suzy Bogguss, Jonatha Brooke, and Mary Ann Kennedy. Lionel Cartwright wrote "If That's What You Call Love", which also featured him on piano and background vocals, and Phil Keaggy played guitar on the closing track "Beautiful Fool". Thom Owens of Allmusic stated that "though the glossy production may put off some of her old country-folk fans, Love Travels is a typically tasteful and compelling record". Bob Cannon of Entertainment Weekly praised the inclusion of Gillian Welch and Cheryl Wheeler songs, calling it "her most mature and focused work yet."

Her last Mercury album was The Innocent Years in 2000. Before the album's release, Mattea returned to West Virginia to care for her father, who had been diagnosed with colon cancer. She said that this resulted in a very intermittent recording process, but also informed the album's content; she told Country Standard Time, "I spent a lot of time thinking about what's important to me. I think this is an album about those things." Although Mattea rarely writes her material, she wrote two songs on the album with Vezner. The album's final track, a novelty song called "BFD", was included as a bonus track because it was popular with fans, but she was unsure of how to sequence it with the rest of the album. "The Trouble with Angels" and "BFD" made the Hot Country Songs charts in 2000, although neither made Top 40. Country Standard Time reviewer Eli Messinger wrote that "though the smooth sound and heart-on-her-sleeve lyrics may not be for the country roots fan...Mattea's superb voice and mature readings are clearly the work of an accomplished artist chasing her musical muse."

=== 2002–present: Music transition and bluegrass ===
For 2002's Roses, Mattea moved to Narada Productions. She said that she chose to work with this label after leaving Mercury because she felt that the label would "give [her] alternative marketing ideas" and "didn't see [her] musical restlessness as a liability". She said that she wanted to keep a contemporary folk and Celtic influence. Mattea supported the album with a tour largely focused on performing arts centers. Narada serviced "They Are the Roses" to Adult Contemporary and country stations, and "I'm Alright" to Adult album alternative and Americana music formats. Maria Konicki Dinoia wrote in Allmusic that "she pushes the envelope, bringing to the forefront the blending of the Scottish/Irish music found in small doses on her last few albums." One year later, she released her second Christmas disc, Joy for Christmas Day, which continued in her Celtic music influences. This album was inspired by her annual Christmas tours that she had done ever since the release of Good News.

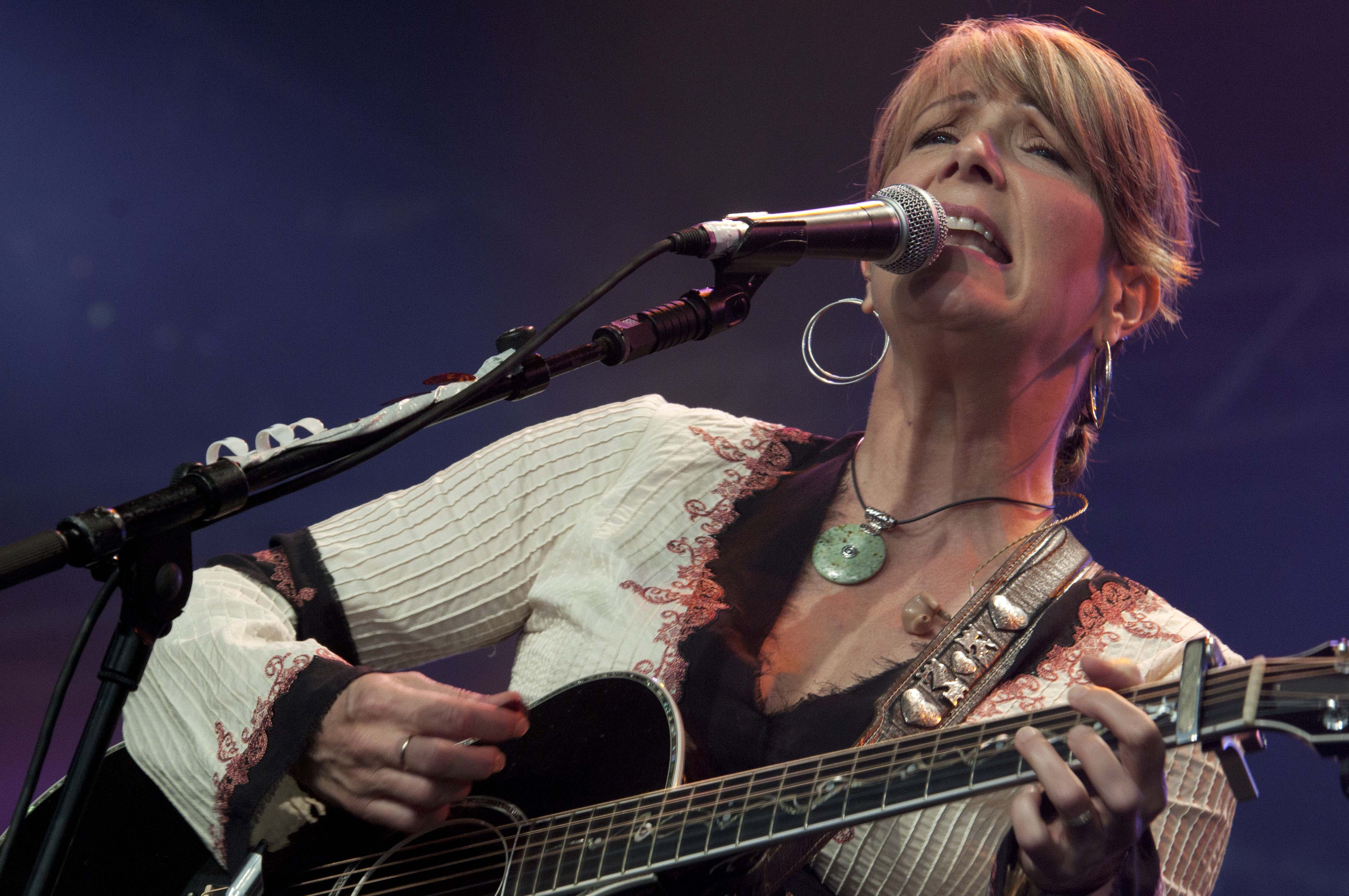
Mattea at the 2010 Cambridge Folk Festival in England

Her third overall album for Narada was 2005's Right Out of Nowhere. Produced entirely by Mattea, the album included covers of The Rolling Stones' "Gimme Shelter" and Creedence Clearwater Revival's "Down on the Corner", along with a rendition of the spiritual "Wade in the Water". Allmusic and Country Standard Time both reviewed these covers in particular with favor, with the latter's Dan MacIntosh also noting that "Mattea chooses songs that are mostly optimistic, even though hers is a kind of hard-won optimism."

The bluegrass album Coal followed in 2008. Mattea released this album independently on her own Captain Potato Records. Mattea said that she chose to do an album themed to coal mining after the Sago Mine disaster, and worked with country and bluegrass singer Marty Stuart as her producer. She said that she was unsure about recording the song "Black Lung" until Stuart noted that the recording engineer on the session had gotten emotional and begun to cry during her take on the song. A second album of bluegrass-influenced and primiarly coal mining-themed songs, Calling Me Home, followed in 2014 on Sugar Hill Records.

In the mid 2010s, Mattea began having problems with gaining control of her singing voice. The problems (which stemmed from the effects of menopause), caused her to question whether she should continue performing altogether. She began working with a vocal coach who helped her find her singing voice again. This resulted in her next studio album. In 2018, Pretty Bird, was released independently with Tim O'Brien serving as producer. The album's first single is a cover of Martha Carson's "I Can't Stand Up Alone", recorded as a tribute to Jesse Winchester. Also included on the album are covers of The Wood Brothers' "Chocolate on My Tongue", Bobbie Gentry's "Ode to Billie Joe", and Joan Osborne's "St. Teresa", the last of which is the album's second single.

In 2021, Mattea became the new host of the Mountain Stage, a program that is aired by West Virginia's NPR network. The program broadcasts once a week in two hour-long episodes that are aired on 280 stations.

On August 11, 2025, Mattea was surprised during an appearance at the Grand Ole Opry by her longtime friend Charlie McCoy, who unplugged her microphone during a performance of "Eighteen Wheels and a Dozen Roses" and invited her to become the next member of the Opry, which she accepted. Mattea's official induction ceremony is scheduled for October 11.

== Artistry ==
=== Musical styles ===
Mattea's music was categorized as country during her years as a commercial recording artist. During her peak success, Mattea also included elements of bluegrass, Celtic and folk into her artistry. Authors Mary A. Bufwack and Robert K. Oermann noted that Mattea was part of a group of country artists that took inspiration from the American folk revival by incorporating "modern sensibilities to create powerfully appealing images". Bufwack and Oermann found her counterparts to be Mary Chapin Carpenter, Suzy Bogguss, and Wynonna Judd. Writer Thomas Harrison found that Mattea also had elements of "Southern California Rock" that mixed in "mountain elements" because she often incorporated the acoustic guitar. After recording 2008's Coal, Mattea's musical identity shifted towards Appalachian music and has since made it a part of her artistry.

=== Collaborations ===
Mattea participated in several collaborative works, primarily in the 1990s. In March 1991, Mattea was one of several artists on "Voices That Care", a charity single to help boost the morale of U.S. troops involved in Operation Desert Storm. Dolly Parton's 1993 single "Romeo" featured guest vocals from Mattea, Tanya Tucker, Mary Chapin Carpenter, Pam Tillis, and Billy Ray Cyrus. Mattea appeared on two tracks from the 1994 Red Hot + Country compilation, put out by the AIDS activism group Red Hot Organization. The first of these was a cover of "Teach Your Children" which also featured Suzy Bogguss, Alison Krauss, and Crosby, Stills & Nash, and the second was a duet with Jackson Browne titled "Rock Me on the Water". The former, credited to "The Red Hots", charted at No. 75 on Hot Country Songs dated for October 22, 1994. Also in 1994, Mattea sang duet vocals on Johnny Hallyday's "Love Affair", which made No. 35 on the French Syndicat National de l'Édition Phonographique (SNEP) charts. In 1998, Mattea recorded a duet with Michael McDonald titled "Among the Missing", a charity single to help benefit the National Center for Missing & Exploited Children (NCMEC). It was written by Peter McCann and produced by George Massenburg, and a video of the performance was also issued on DVD. The song charted for a single week at No. 73 on Hot Country Songs dated for March 27, 1999.

== Personal life ==
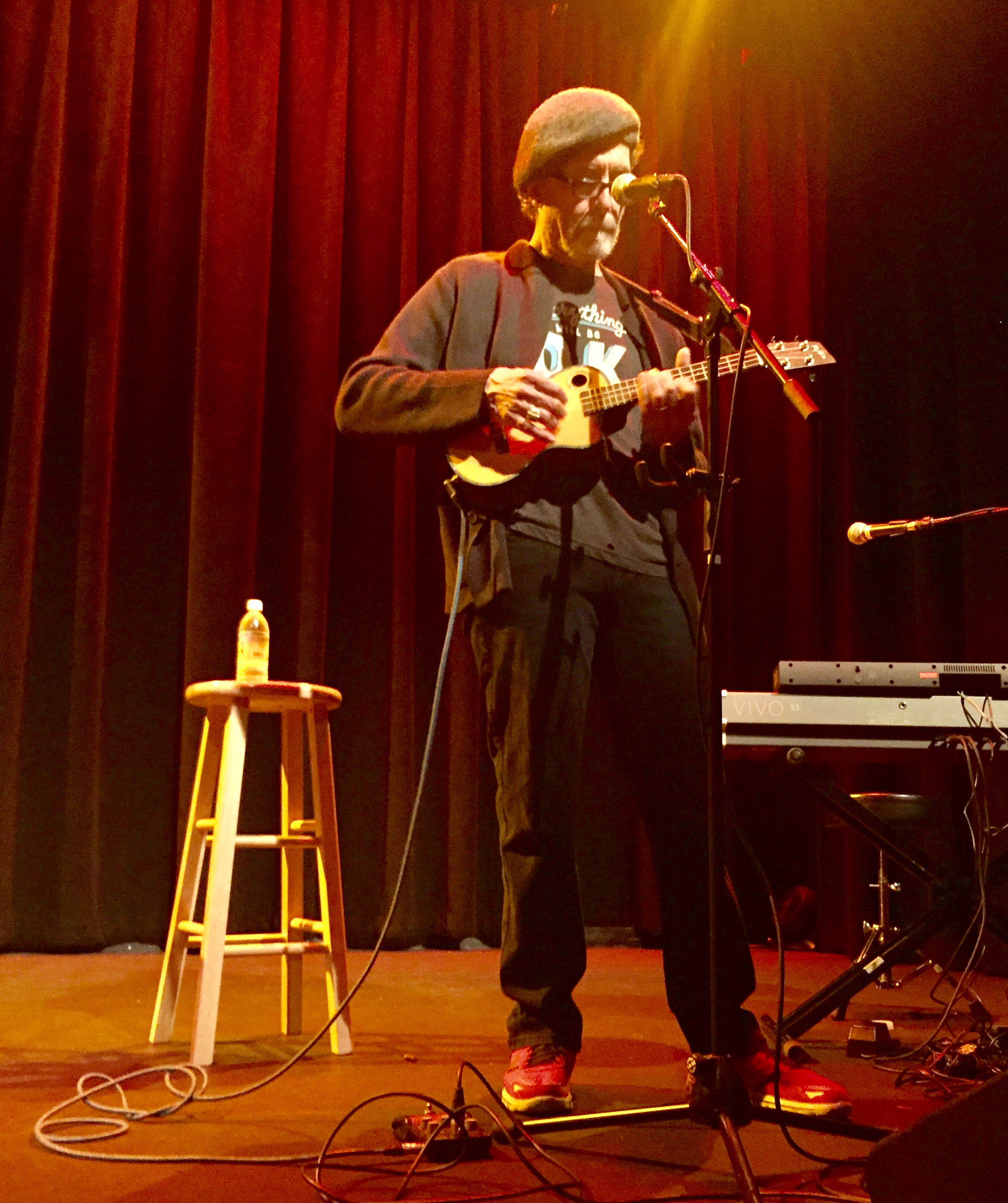
Mattea has been married to Jon Vezner since 1988; he has also written several of her singles.

Mattea has been married to songwriter Jon Vezner since February 14, 1988. He started a publishing company underneath the apartment in which Mattea lived in the 1980s, and the two met after he jump-started her car. Vezner wrote four of Mattea's singles: "Where've You Been", "Whole Lotta Holes", "Time Passes By", and "A Few Good Things Remain", along with singles by Diamond Rio and Clay Walker. The couple briefly separated in the early 2000s, but later reconciled. "All marriages have their moments when things don't run smoothly," Vezner stated, "but neither of us walks away when things get difficult. We challenge each other and learn from each other." Mattea and Vezner do not have children but have had both cats and dogs. The couple currently resides in Nashville, Tennessee. In 2003, Mattea's father died following a long battle with colon cancer. In 2005, Mattea's mother died due to complications of Alzheimer's disease.

Mattea is known for her roles in AIDS activism. In 1992, many televised awards shows were handing out red ribbons to participants in honor of AIDS awareness, but the Country Music Association chose to hand out green ribbons promoting environmental awareness instead. Mattea chose to wear three red ribbons that night, each one honoring a friend of hers who had died of the disease, along with the green ribbon. A 1994 article in the Chicago Tribune noted that a Nashville newspaper interpreted a comment she had made on wearing both color ribbons as a confrontation, and that Mattea was often questioned as to whether her activism had a negative impact on sales of her then-current album. Besides her participation in the Red Hot + Country charity album series, Mattea also participated in charity concerts and made public appearances in activism campaigns. She was also the recipient of the inaugural Harvard AIDS Initiative award in 1994.

== Discography ==
Studio albums

- Kathy Mattea (1984)
- From My Heart (1985)
- Walk the Way the Wind Blows (1986)
- Untasted Honey (1987)
- Willow in the Wind (1989)
- Time Passes By (1991)
- Lonesome Standard Time (1992)
- Walking Away a Winner (1994)
- Love Travels (1997)
- The Innocent Years (2000)
- Roses (2002)
- Right Out of Nowhere (2005)
- Coal (2008)
- Calling Me Home (2012)
- Pretty Bird (2018)

Christmas albums

- Good News (1993)
- Joy for Christmas Day (2003)

=== Billboard number-one hits ===
- "Goin' Gone" (1 week, 1987-1988)
- "Eighteen Wheels and a Dozen Roses" (2 weeks, 1988)
- "Come From the Heart" (1 week, 1989)
- "Burnin' Old Memories" (1 week, 1989)

== Filmography ==
Film and television appearances by Kathy Mattea
Title	Year	Role	Notes	Ref.
Maverick	1994	Woman with concealed guns		
Touched by an Angel	2000	JJ	Season 7, Episode 5: "Finger of God"	
Rachel & Andrew Jackson: A Love Story	2001	Narrator		
The Griffin and the Minor Cannon	2002	Mother		
Country Music	2019	Herself	Documentary	

== Awards and nominations ==
Kathy Mattea has received a series of awards, including four from the Country Music Association and two from the Grammy Awards.
