= Good News (Kathy Mattea album) =

Studio album by Kathy Mattea
- Released: September 21, 1993
- Studio: Creative Recording (Berry Hill, Tennessee); Jack's Tracks (Nashville, Tennessee)
- Genre: Country; Christmas; Gospel
- Length: 37:59
- Label: Mercury; PolyGram
- Producer: Brent Maher; Allen Reynolds

Kathy Mattea chronology
Lonesome Standard Time (1992)	Good News (1993)	Walking Away a Winner (1994)

Good News is a studio album by American country artist, Kathy Mattea. It was released on September 21, 1993, via Mercury Records and the PolyGram label. It was the eighth studio album of Mattea's career and her first collection of Christmas music. The project featured mostly new recordings that embedded gospel music sounds. Good News made the American country albums chart in 1993 and received an accolade from the Grammy Awards in 1994. Critics and writers remarked positively of the album and highlighted its uniqueness as compared to other Christmas album projects.

== Background, recording and content ==
By 1993, Kathy Mattea had reached peak success in her country music career. She had four number one singles and several more that placed in the top 20 of the North American country charts. She also won top honors from the Country Music Association and received the Grammy Award for Best Female Country Vocal Performance for 1989's "Where've You Been". In 1993, she released her first album of Christmas music titled Good News.

The album was recorded at two separate studios: Creative Recording and Jack's Tracks. It was produced mostly by Brent Maher, with one track produced by Allen Reynolds. The album was a collection of ten tracks, most of which were original material. The album's second track, "There's a New Kid in Town", was a song first recorded by Keith Whitley that Mattea found several years prior. "It's just so sweet, and it really got me musically from the beginning," she told the Chicago Tribune. There were also some covers featured on the album such as "Brightest and Best", "Mary, Did You Know?" "Christ's Child's Lullabye". According to the Chicago Tribune, it was the only Christmas carol composed in the Gaelic language of Ireland. The album's title track was written by pop musician, Rob Mathes.

== Release, chart performance and reception ==
Professional ratings
Review scores
Source	Rating
Allmusic	4/5 stars

Good News was released on September 21, 1993, on the Mercury and PolyGram labels. It was the eighth studio album in Mattea's career and first of Christmas music. It was originally offered as both a compact disc and as a cassette. In the 2000s and 2010s it was released to digital sites. Good News entered the American Billboard Top Country Albums chart on December 18, 1993. It spent four weeks there, peaking at the number 51 position on January 1, 1994. It also spent one week on the Billboard Top Christian Albums chart, peaking at number 26 in 1995. It is Mattea's only album to reach the Christian chart to date.

In 1994, Good News won the Best Southern, Country or Bluegrass Gospel Album at the Grammy Awards. It was Mattea's second Grammy win in her career and her last to date. Also in 1994, Mattea embarked on her first Christmas tour based on the album's success.

Good News has received a positive reception from writers and critics. Thom Jurek rated the album four out of five stars, commenting that it was "unlike any country Christmas record ever released". He highlighted the unique song choices and "strange instruments" found on the project. He also found the production to be unique. "This doesn't feel like any Christmas record you've ever heard before, either. It sounds like a well-crafted, gorgeously wrought folk/country/Celtic-flavored Kathy Mattea record," he commented.

== Track listing ==
CD and digital versions
No.	Title	Writer(s)	Length
1.	"What a Wonderful Beginning"	Austin Cunningham; Allen Shamblin	3:54
2.	"There's a New Kid in Town"	Don Cook; Curly Putman; Keith Whitley	3:58
3.	"Brightest and Best"	Traditional; arr. by Kathy Mattea and Brent Maher	3:30
4.	"Mary, Did You Know?"	Buddy Greene; Mark Lowry	3:17
5.	"The Star"	Peter McCann	3:55
6.	"Emmanuel"	Kye Fleming; Janis Ian	2:59
7.	"Somebody Talkin' About Jesus"	Mattea	2:19
8.	"Nothing But a Child"	Steve Earle	4:02
9.	"Christ Child's Lullabye"	Mattea; Dougie MacLean; translation by Kenna Campbell	4:21
10.	"Good News"	Rob Mathes	5:34
Total length:			34:35

== Personnel ==
All credits are adapted from the liner notes of Good News and AllMusic.

Musical personnel

- Kathy Mattea – vocals, backing vocals (2, 3, 5, 6, 8, 9)
- Randy McCormick – keyboards (1–3, 5, 8), acoustic piano (4, 6, 10)
- Catherine Styron – acoustic piano (9)
- Don Potter – acoustic guitar (1–8)
- Chris Leuzinger – electric guitars (2), guitars (8)
- Dougie MacLean – acoustic guitar (9), backing vocals (9)
- Bob Burns – bass (1, 7)
- Duncan Mullins – bass (2–5, 8)
- Lonnie Wilson – drums (2, 3, 5, 8)
- Kenny Malone – drums (4, 9), percussion (9)
- Farrell Morris – percussion (1–3, 5, 7), marimba (2)
- Eric Darken – percussion (3, 4, 6)
- Jim Horn – recorder (3, 9)
- Vicki Hampton – backing vocals (1, 7)
- Donna McElroy – backing vocals (1, 7)
- Gary Burr – backing vocals (2, 5, 8)
- John Thompson – backing vocals (3)

Choir on "Good News"

- Phoebe Binkley
- Robert Binkley (choir director)
- Rebecca Blackwell
- Lori Brooks
- Diane Foust
- Gordon Mote
- Kimberly Mote
- Marcus Rowe
- George Teren
- Jonathan Yeaworth

Production personnel

- Brent Maher – producer (1–8, 10), engineer (1–8, 10), co-producer (9), mixing
- Allen Reynolds – co-producer (9)
- Mark Miller – engineer (9)
- Mills Logan – assistant engineer (1–8, 10), mix assistant
- Jim McKell – assistant engineer (1–8, 10)
- Glenn Meadows – mastering at Masterfonics (Nashville, Tennessee)
- Barnes & Company – album graphics
- Bill Barnes – art direction, design
- Lee Ann Ramey – design
- Jim "Señor" McGuire – photography
- Ann Rice – wardrobe stylist
- Valerie Cole – make-up
- Robert Davis – hair
- Titley & Associates – management

== Charts ==
Chart (1993–1994)	Peak position
US Christian Albums (Billboard)	26
US Top Country Albums (Billboard)	51

== Accolades ==
Year	Nominee / work	Award	Result	Ref.
1994	36th Annual Grammy Awards	Best Southern, Country or Bluegrass Gospel Album	Won	

== Release history ==
Release history and formats for Good News
Region	Date	Format	Label	Ref.
North America	September 21, 1993	CD; cassette	PolyGram; Mercury Records	
North America	2000s–2010s	Music download; streaming	Mercury Records	
