= A Collection of Hits =

Untold Stories: A Collection of Hits

Greatest hits album by Kathy Mattea
- Released: August 7, 1990
- Recorded: 1986–1990
- Studio: Jack's Tracks (Nashville, Tennessee)
- Genre: Country
- Length: 34:56
- Label: Mercury; PolyGram
- Producer: Allen Reynolds

Kathy Mattea chronology
Willow in the Wind (1989)	Untold Stories: A Collection of Hits (1990)	Time Passes By (1991)

Singles from A Collection of Hits
- 1. "The Battle Hymn of Love" Released: July 21, 1990; 2. "A Few Good Things Remain" Released: November 10, 1990

Professional ratings
Review scores
Source	Rating
AllMusic	4.5/5 stars
Robert Christgau	(1-star Honorable Mention)
The Rolling Stone Album Guide	3.5/5 stars

Untold Stories: A Collection of Hits is the first compilation by American country music artist Kathy Mattea. It was released in 1990 on Mercury Records and has been certified platinum by the RIAA. The album includes eight of her previous singles, as well as one newly recorded track ("A Few Good Things Remain"), and an album cut from 1987's Untasted Honey, the Tim O'Brien duet "The Battle Hymn of Love". Both of these songs were released as singles in 1990, and both reached #9 on the Billboard country charts.

== Critical reception ==
AllMusic's William Ruhlmann writes, "Kathy Mattea has risen to near the top of the Nashville ranks because of a haunting, soulful voice, well-produced recordings that have a simple, folkie directness, and, most especially, an amazing talent for picking the best songs being written for the country market"

== Track listing ==
No.	Title	Writer(s)	Length
1.	"Love at the Five and Dime"	Nanci Griffith	3:40
2.	"Walk the Way the Wind Blows"	Tim O'Brien	3:48
3.	"Train of Memories"	Andy Byrd, Jimbeau Hinson	2:52
4.	"Goin' Gone"	Pat Alger, Bill Dale, Fred Koller	4:26
5.	"The Battle Hymn of Love" (featuring Tim O'Brien)	Paul Overstreet, Don Schlitz	2:53
6.	"Eighteen Wheels and a Dozen Roses"	Paul Nelson, Gene Nelson	3:22
7.	"Untold Stories"	O'Brien	3:01
8.	"Life as We Knew It"	Koller, Walter Carter	3:19
9.	"A Few Good Things Remain"	Alger, Jon Vezner	3:51
10.	"Where've You Been"	Don Henry, Vezner	3:44
Total length:			34:56

- Track information and credits adapted from the album's liner notes.

== Personnel ==
"A Few Good Things Remain"

- Kathy Mattea – vocals
- Bobby Wood – organ
- Pat Alger – acoustic guitar
- Bruce Bouton – acoustic guitar
- Bob Wray – bass
- Milton Sledge – drums

== Production ==
- Allen Reynolds – producer
- Mark Miller – recording, mixing
- Denny Purcell – mastering at Georgetown Masters (Nashville, Tennessee)
- Barnes & Company – album graphics
- Bill Barnes – art direction, design
- Jim "Señor" McGuire – photography
- Valerie Cole – make-up
- Sherri McCoy – make-up
- Ann Rice – wardrobe stylist
- Bob Titley – management

== Charts ==
=== Weekly charts ===
Chart (1990)	Peak position
US Billboard 200	80
US Top Country Albums (Billboard)	8

=== Year-end charts ===
Chart (1990)	Position
US Top Country Albums (Billboard)	66
Chart (1991)	Position
US Top Country Albums (Billboard)	20
Chart (1992)	Position
US Top Country Albums (Billboard)	75

== Certifications ==
Region	Certification	Certified units/sales
United States (RIAA)	Platinum	1,000,000^{^}
^{^} Shipments figures based on certification alone.

== Release history ==
Release history and formats for A Collection of Hits
Region	Date	Format	Label	Ref.
North America	August 7, 1990	LP; CD; cassette	PolyGram; Mercury Records	
