= Love Travels =

Studio album by Kathy Mattea
- Released: February 4, 1997
- Recorded: June–December 1996
- Studio: Woodland Sound Studios and Magazine Street Studios (Nashville, Tennessee); Red House Studios (New York City, New York); BearTracks Studios (Suffern, New York); My Generation Studio (Somerville, Maine)
- Genre: Contemporary country; country folk
- Length: 47:17
- Label: Mercury Records Nashville
- Producer: Kathy Mattea; Ben Wisch

Kathy Mattea chronology
Walking Away a Winner (1994)	Love Travels (1997)	The Innocent Years (2000)

Singles from Love Travels
- 1. "455 Rocket" Released: January 18, 1997; 2. "I'm on Your Side" Released: May 19, 1997; 3. "Love Travels" Released: August 1997; 4. "Patiently Waiting" Released: 1998

Love Travels is the tenth studio album by American country music artist, Kathy Mattea. It was released on February 4, 1997, via Mercury Records Nashville. The disc contained a total of 11 tracks that blended a mixture of different musical styles. Love Travels spawned four singles, two of which made the North American country songs charts: "455 Rocket" and the title track. The album itself reached the top 20 of the American country albums chart and was reviewed positively by critics.

== Background ==
Steve Huey of AllMusic described Kathy Mattea as "one of the most respected female country stars of her era" as well as "a commercially successful hitmaker". During the eighties and nineties, four of Mattea's singles topped the North American country charts: "Eighteen Wheels and a Dozen Roses", "Goin' Gone", "Burnin' Old Memories" and "Come from the Heart". Several more made the top ten and top 20 during those decades. By the mid nineties, Mattea had begun changing her artistic direction. For her next album, Mattea explained that she wanted to "delver deeper" into what she was "feeling". "It's such a gift to be paid for being who you are as an artist. I'm so lucky to have a very loyal following of people who've stayed with me through all of my eclectic restlessness. They always want to see what I am going to do next," she explained in 1997.

== Recording and content ==
Love Travels was co-produced by Mattea, along with Ben Wisch and assistant production credits from Shane Tarleton. The album was recorded between June and December 1996 at Woodland Studios, located in Nashville, Tennessee. It incorporated commercial country music with elements of country folk. Other genres explored in some selections included Celtic, Caribbean and New Orleans musical styles. Mattea told the Sun Sentinel that she wanted the songs to guide her musical direction for the album.

Love Travels consisted of 11 tracks of material. One track featured writing credits from Mattea's husband (and songwriter), Jon Vezner. Titled "All Roads to the River" was composed with singer-songwriter, Janis Ian. The fifth features vocals from country artist, Suzy Bogguss. Titled "Further and Further Away", the song discusses how parents age as their children develop into maturity. Mattea personally connected with the song as she was watching both her parents age at the time. Other themes about romance are found on songs like "If That's What You Call Love". The sixth track, "455 Rocket", is a story song built around a man's love of an Oldsmobile 88 car. The final track, "Beautiful Fool", discusses how social leaders like Martin Luther King, Jr. tried to solve problems without using physical violence.

== Critical reception ==
Professional ratings
Review scores
Source	Rating
AllMusic	3/5 stars
Chicago Tribune	3/4 stars
Entertainment Weekly	B+

Love Travels received a mostly positive critical reception. In their review, Entertainment Weekly gave the album a B+ rating. Thom Owens of AllMusic rated the project three out of five stars. He found the album's production to evoke more polished sounds that her previous works, but nonetheless found it to be a strong collection of material. Owens further commented that it walks "the perfect middle-ground between country-folk and mainstream contemporary country."

The Chicago Tribune gave the project three out of four stars, noting the blending the album's incorporation of various musical styles. "Mattea just keeps rolling along in her 11th studio album, another engaging effort highlighted by songs from Gillian Welch, Jim Lauderdale, Cheryl Wheeler and Janis Ian. Love and the human spirit reign triumphant in songs that urge listeners to find their muses and trust those pesky inner voices," the newspaper commented. Robert Loy of Country Standard Time found the album to be more personal that previous works in his review: "For some time now, Kathy Mattea has managed to walk the line between commercialism and a more mature artistic vision. Her previous release Walking Away a Winner was radio friendly, but she's back on more personal, even spiritual ground on Love Travels.

== Release, chart performance and singles ==
Love Travels was released on February 4, 1997, on Mercury Records Nashville. It was originally offered as both a compact disc and a cassette. It was later released to digital sites for downloading and streaming purposes. The album entered the American Billboard Top Country Albums chart on February 22, 1997, and spent 28 weeks there. On April 12, 1997, it peaked at number 15 on the chart. It also made the Billboard 200 all-genre chart, reaching number 121 on April 12, 1997, after 14 weeks on the chart. It also became her second album to make the United Kingdom's Official Charts Company all-genre chart, reaching number 65.

Four singles were spawned from Love Travels. The first was "455 Rocket", which was issued on January 18, 1997. On April 19, 1997, the song peaked at number 21 on the Billboard Hot Country Songs chart. It also reached the top 20 of Canada's RPM country chart, peaking at number 16 around the same time. The next single issued from the album was the track, "I'm on Your Side", which was issued to radio on May 19, 1997. The single did not chart on Billboard's country survey. It was followed by the title track, which was released in August 1997. The song later peaked at number 39 on the Billboard country chart after 16 weeks there. It also reached number 79 on the RPM country songs chart. The final single issued from Love Travels was the track, "Patiently Waiting", which not chart on Billboard. It was released in 1998.

== Track listing ==
CD and digital versions
No.	Title	Writer(s)	Length
1.	"Love Travels"	Bob Halligan Jr.; Linda Halligan	5:31
2.	"Sending Me Angels"	Francis John Miller; Jerry Lynn Williams	4:16
3.	"Patiently Waiting"	Gillian Welch	5:05
4.	"If That's What You Call Love"	Lionel Cartwright	4:30
5.	"Further and Further Away"	Cheryl Wheeler	4:32
6.	"455 Rocket"	David Rawlings; Welch	4:09
7.	"I'm on Your Side"	Jim Lauderdale	3:10
8.	"The Bridge"	Tom Kimmel; Jim Pittman	3:26
9.	"All Roads to the River"	Janis Ian; Jon Vezner	3:17
10.	"The End of the Line"	Kye Fleming; Mark Stephen Cawley; Mary Ann Kennedy	4:29
11.	"Beautiful Fool"	Don Henry	4:52
Total length:			47:17

== Personnel ==
All credits are adapted from the liner notes of Love Travels.

- Kathy Mattea – vocals, backing vocals (7)
- Bob Halligan Jr. – acoustic piano (1), acoustic guitar (1), backing vocals (1, 6)
- Tim Lauer – accordion (1), harmonium (1), synthesizers (4)
- Matt Rollings – acoustic piano (2, 3), Hammond B3 organ (2, 3, 8), Wurlitzer electric piano (8, 10)
- Lionel Cartwright – acoustic piano (4), backing vocals (4)
- Ben Wisch – synthesizers (5, 10, 11)
- Bill Cooley – acoustic guitar (1)
- Duke Levine – electric guitar (1–4, 10), acoustic guitar (4), slide guitar (8, 9), mandola (9)
- Don Potter – acoustic guitar (2–4, 6, 8–10), resonator guitar (10)
- John Leventhal – acoustic guitar (5), electric guitar (5), mando-guitar (5), bouzouki (5), bass (5)
- Pat Buchanan – electric guitar (6, 7)
- Jim Lauderdale – acoustic guitar (7)
- George Marinelli – electric guitar (7)
- John Jennings – baritone guitar (9)
- Phil Keaggy – acoustic guitar (11)
- Steve Sturm – pedal steel guitar (1)
- Paul Franklin – pedal steel guitar (2, 4)
- Jerry Douglas – dobro (6)
- Stuart Duncan – mandolin (6)
- Jonathan Yudkin – mandolin (10)
- James "Hutch" Hutchinson – bass (1–4, 6–10)
- Edgar Meyer – double bass (11)
- Abe Laboriel Jr. – drums (1, 2, 4, 5, 8–10), percussion (1, 5, 10)
- Jim Keltner – drums (3, 6, 7), maracas (6), tambourine (7)
- Kirby Shelstad – percussion (2, 4, 7, 9)
- Farrell Morris – congas (3), shaker (3), tambourine (3)
- Hunter Lee – pennywhistle (1), bagpipes (1), digeridoo (9)
- Chris Carmichael – fiddle (1), cello (1)
- Kirk "Jelly Roll" Johnson – harmonica (6)
- Mary Ann Kennedy – backing vocals (1, 8, 10)
- Michael McDonald – backing vocals (1, 8, 10)
- Donna McElroy – backing vocals (1)
- Suzy Wills – backing vocals (1, 3, 9)
- Bob Bailey – backing vocals (2)
- Kim Fleming – backing vocals (2)
- Vicki Hampton – backing vocals (2)
- Louis Nunley – backing vocals (2)
- Jonatha Brooke – backing vocals (3, 9)
- Kathy Chiavola – backing vocals (4)
- Suzy Bogguss – backing vocals (5)
- Kim Richey – backing vocals (6)

Handclaps

- Chris Carmichael (1)
- Bob Halligan Jr. (1)
- Tim Lauer (1)
- Hunter Lee (1)
- Duke Levine (1, 2)
- Kathy Mattea (1, 2)
- James "Hutch" Hutchinson (2)
- Abe Laboriel Jr. (2)

Foot taps & knee slaps on "455 Rocket"

- James "Hutch" Hutchinson
- Jim Keltner
- Kathy Mattea

=== Production ===
- Kathy Mattea – producer
- Ben Wisch – producer, engineer, mixing, additional overdub engineer
- Mark Frigo – assistant engineer
- Daniel Leanse – assistant engineer
- Steve Regina – mix assistant
- Mick Conley – additional overdub engineer
- Paul Martin – additional overdub engineer
- Chris Rival – additional overdub engineer
- Rich Cohan – additional mix assistant
- Chris Stone – additional mix assistant
- John McGriff – technical assistance
- Ted Jensen – mastering at Sterling Sound (New York, NY)
- Shane Tarleton – production assistant
- Jill Dell'Abate – production coordinator
- Buddy Jackson – art direction
- Jim Kemp – art direction
- Karinne Gaulkins – design
- Christie Knubel – heart illustration
- Russ Harrington – photography
- Titley/Spalding & Associates – management

== Charts ==
=== Weekly charts ===
Chart (1997)	Peak position
Scottish Albums (OCC)	71
UK Albums (OCC)	65
US Billboard 200	121
US Top Country Albums (Billboard)	15

=== Year-end charts ===
Chart (1997)	Position
US Top Country Albums (Billboard)	65

== Release history ==
Release history and formats for Love Travels
Region	Date	Format	Label	Ref.
North America	February 4, 1997	CD; cassette	Mercury Records Nashville	
United Kingdom	February 4, 1997	CD	Mercury Records	
North America	2000s–2010s	Music download; streaming	Mercury Nashville Records	
