= Life as We Know It =

Life as We Know It or Life as We Knew It may refer to:

- Life, as we know it on Earth, as described using standard biochemistry
- Life as We Know It (film), a 2010 romantic comedy film directed by Greg Berlanti
- Life as We Know It (TV series), a 2004 American television drama
- Life as We Know It (REO Speedwagon album), 1987
- Life as We Know It (Lonestar album), 2013, or the title track
- Life as We Know It (EP), by American Alternative rock band Wild Colonials
- "Life as We Knew It" (song), 1989 single by Kathy Mattea
- Life as We Knew It (novel), science fiction novel by Susan Beth Pfeffer
