= Bill Tush =

American news journalist, humorist (born 1948)

- Born: William John Tush, III; October 16, 1948 (age 77); Pittsburgh, Pennsylvania, U.S.
- Occupations: News journalist; humorist
- Years active: 1965–present

William John Tush, III (born October 16, 1948) is an American news journalist and humorist. In high school, Tush showed an early interest in broadcast performance and started working in radio professionally while a Junior in High school. Tush went to work in Atlanta, Georgia for Ted Turner, first as an announcer, later developing Tush, a comedy show broadcast on Turner's WTBS SuperStation.

== Early life and education ==
Tush was born October 16, 1948, in Pittsburgh, Pennsylvania, the only child of Apolonia "Pauline" (née Kirzyc) and William John Tush Jr.

Living in the Lawrenceville neighborhood of Pittsburgh, Tush attended Arsenal Washington Vocational Technical High School, graduating in 1966.

While in high school, Tush showed an early interest in broadcast performance. He said that as young child he was drawn to radio announcer's voices. "They came alive to me...I was much more comfortable with them than I was the people in my real life."

Tush chose not to attend college in order to continue his professional broadcasting career.

=== High school announcer ===
While attending high school, Tush conducted the morning audio announcements, using the name "Tush the Great". Tush was a staff member of the Washington Highlights, the high school's newspaper as well as an editor of the school's yearbook The Cavalier. His senior yearbook entry said he "plans to get into the radio".

=== Early radio station ===
Tush built a low power broadcast radio station in his parents' attic. Using the call letters "WJTC", Tush and a friend broadcast rhythm and blues music and high school news after school on weekdays and all day on weekends. "On a good day, the signal could be heard over the entire block".

=== Commercial broadcaster while in high school ===
While a junior in high school, Tush was hired by a nearby Latrobe, Pennsylvania radio station as a utility broadcaster, working as a disk jockey, news announcer and engineer, filling in for an employee who had been drafted. Tush said he found himself playing recorded crop reports and hosting the station's "Mid Morning Polka Party".

== Broadcasting career ==
=== Radio broadcaster ===
Tush began his professional career after high school as a radio newscaster and disk jockey for a number of radio stations in the Pittsburgh area, including KQV AM where he was known as Bill Williams.

Tush was drafted in 1969, served in the U.S. Army, spending six months in Vietnam as a communications specialist. Returning to Pittsburgh, Tush was the late afternoon drive time disk jockey on WEDO AM radio. He also worked simultaneously on KQV, again using the name Bill Williams to avoid listener confusion. By 1971, his WEDO time slot was named "The Bill Tush Show".

=== Atlanta years ===
In 1974, Tush traveled to Atlanta, looking for work. He was hired by WGST AM as a disk jockey playing the station's oldies format. "It was a strange place to work" Tush said. One day, after playing the Johnny Bristol song "Hang on in There Baby", a station employee walked in, picked up the record from the turntable and broke it, saying "I hate that record".

=== SuperStation WTBS ===
Bored with radio, Tush tried television. "One weekend I was watching this local television station that ran all these great movies but they were in such bad shape – they were scratchy I remember – but they were all the old great black-and-white films that I've always loved. I was hooked on this television station. But the station was so bad I thought 'I could get a job there'". The station was WTCG Channel 17. Tush walked into the station carrying his reel-to-reel demo tape and asked if the television station needed any announcers. They did. He was hired as a part-time booth announcer for $50 per week.

Station owner Ted Turner used satellite broadcasting to greatly enlarge his station's broadcast footprint. Turner's WTCG became "WTBS - your SuperStation" and the station was suddenly available on hundreds of cable channels across America, providing content 24 hours a day, seven days a week. WTBS quickly became a hit in households across the country. As WTCG evolved into SuperStation WTBS, Tush did voice-over station promotions and station identifications. He was one of the few who was seen on-air at the station, appearing in commercials and occasionally moderating public affairs shows. Station owner Turner stopped Tush in the hallway one day and said "You're doin' a good job. Smile more."

One night, Turner said to Tush "Hi Bill, you're doing a good job. Are you doing what you want to do?" Tush said "I want to host the movies". The next day, WTBS' Director of Operations Sid Pike called Tush and said "You're going to host (WTBS') Academy Award Theatre".

=== Parody news programs ===
The FCC required the station to broadcast news, so Turner suggested Tush record a 20 minute newscast to air after the end of the late night movie. The newscast was named 17 Update Early in the Morning.

It was rebroadcast at 5 am Turner jokingly commented, "we'll have a 100% share (of the viewership ratings) at that time". Initially, the newscast was simply Tush recording a voice-over of the days' news. He signed off by saying "Have a nice night or morning, whatever the case may be". Later, Turner told Tush "Why don't we have someone on-camera doing the news? You're the announcer. Why don't you do it?"

The late night time slot and having full control over content allowed Tush to take great liberties with the news presentations. One episode saw Tush literally dragged off the set by a "kidnapper" as Tush delivered "news" of diplomats being kidnapped around the globe. Tush said "There was fake panic from the crew" as he forcibly removed from behind his news set desk.

One stunt saw Tush and his crew promoting the addition of "a new, award-winning weatherman from Cleveland, Ohio". A week-long promotion built audience interest. The day the new "weatherman" started, Tush placed an older announcer who worked off-air for the station in front of a weather map. When the "weatherman" was given his cue that he was on the air, the announcer introduced himself, grabbed his chest and "died" on air, causing another false panic on set.

Tush once delivered the news with his "co-anchor" Rex, a German Shepherd. The dog (who belonged to an associate) was shown next to Tush on set wearing a shirt and tie while eating a peanut butter sandwich. Rex appeared only on one episode but a myth grew where many people thought the dog was a nightly guest. Tush was often joined by a so-called "Unknown Newsman" who read the news while wearing a paper sack on his head. Tush and his team invented stories and false news, reporting made up holiday parades and a "rocket launch" which included footage of a paper airplane set on fire. Tush said he knew the reach of the new cable SuperStation had grown when he was invited by fans in Valdez, Alaska to be the grand marshal of their winter festival parade.

Tush's parody news programs are now considered a forerunner of both Saturday Night Live's Weekend Update and The Daily Show.

=== Tush television show ===
Hoping to capitalize on Tush's growing national fame from the satirical overnight newscasts, Turner told Tush to develop a comedy show for WTBS. "I want you to do a show. It can be variety, it can be comedy, I don't care. I'll pay you $100,000 (equivalent to $443,604 in 2025) a year to promise you'll never leave". Tush said "Of course, I'll do that. I won't leave". Turner continued, saying "We're gonna have everything: comedy, singin', maybe even wrasslin'. You're gonna host it!" Tush left the meeting and said to his production director and said "What are we going to do now?". Tush said he "had no clue what we were doing".

Premiering on December 28, 1980, Tush (also known as The Bill Tush Show) was an inventive sketch-comedy hour with a troupe. Its cast included Jan Hooks, a comedienne from Decatur, Georgia who went on to Saturday Night Live and 3rd Rock from the Sun. It also featured Ted Henning, Bonnie and Terry Turner (SNL writers and co-creators of 3rd Rock from the Sun and That '70s Show).

The hour-long program aired at 7 pm Eastern time on Sunday evenings. Although the show ceased production five months later on June 6, 1981, reruns aired through May 28, 1983 on a late-night basis. The following week of its old timeslot was filled by Night Tracks, a six-hour program of music videos. Ironically, later that year, Tush made a comedic appearance in a Night Tracks sales presentation video playing an investigative reporter.

=== CNN ===
Feeling he had no further work at WTBS for Tush, Turner eventually dispatched Tush to Hollywood to take over the host position on People Now from Mike Douglas in January 1983. The show was broadcast on Turner Broadcasting's CNN channel. Eventually, Tush became senior entertainment correspondent for CNN in 1993 and moved to New York City to host Showbiz Today.

== Later career ==
Tush retired from Turner Broadcasting System to pursue other interests, including writing and producing, in 2003. Tush returned to Atlanta, where he originally obtained fame.

Tush made a rare public appearance September 12, 2009, at Atlanta's Variety Playhouse to introduce Darryl Rhoades & the Hahavishnu Orchestra Celebration.

In 2014 Tush travelled to Nigeria to help launch a television station; when he returned to Atlanta in 2015, he was hired as the manager of a small multiplex movie theater in the Atlanta suburb of Sandy Springs, where he continued to work after the theater changed hands and was renovated to include a full bar and restaurant.

== Filmography ==
- Down to Earth (TV) as a news reporter
- The Rising Son (TV - Adult Swim) as Pontius Pilate
- Showbiz Today
- Tush
- The Legend of Chick Chandler

== See also ==
- Jan Hooks
- Darryl Rhoades
- Ted Turner
