= Willow in the Wind =

Studio album by Kathy Mattea
- Released: April 4, 1989
- Studios: Jack's Tracks (Nashville, Tennessee)
- Genre: Country
- Length: 34:03
- Labels: Mercury; PolyGram
- Producer: Allen Reynolds

Kathy Mattea chronology
Untasted Honey (1987)	Willow in the Wind (1989)	A Collection of Hits (1990)

Singles from Willow in the Wind
- 1. "Come from the Heart" Released: April 1989; 2. "Burnin' Old Memories" Released: July 1989; 3. "Where've You Been" Released: November 25, 1989; 4. "She Came from Fort Worth" Released: April 7, 1990

Professional ratings
Review scores
Source	Rating
AllMusic	4.5/5 stars
Q	3/5 stars
The Rolling Stone Album Guide	2.5/5 stars

Willow in the Wind is the fifth studio album by American country music artist Kathy Mattea. It was released in 1989 (see 1989 in country music) on Mercury Records. The album is her highest-peaking entry on the Top Country Albums charts, where it reached number 6. It was also certified gold by the RIAA. Four singles were released from it, and all four reached Top Ten on the Billboard country singles charts. First were the back-to-back number 1 hits "Come from the Heart" and "Burnin' Old Memories", followed by the number 10 "Where've You Been" and number 2 "She Came from Fort Worth". "Where've You Been" also charted on the Hot Adult Contemporary Tracks charts, peaking at number 25 there. This song also earned her the 1990 Grammy Award for Best Female Country Vocal Performance.

== Track listing ==
No.	Title	Writer(s)	Length
1.	"Come from the Heart"	Susanna Clark, Richard Leigh	3:08
2.	"Here's Hopin'"	Bob Regan, Mark D. Sanders	2:54
3.	"Burnin' Old Memories"	Larry Boone, Paul Nelson, Gene Nelson	2:18
4.	"She Came from Fort Worth"	Pat Alger, Fred Koller	3:31
5.	"True North"	Wendy Waldman, Phil Galdston	4:20
6.	"Hills of Alabam'"	Mark Fair, Claire Lynch	3:12
7.	"Willow in the Wind"	Randy Albright, Lisa Silver, Sanders	3:43
8.	"Love Chooses You"	Laurie Lewis	4:16
9.	"I'll Take Care of You"	Sanders, Karen Staley	2:57
10.	"Where've You Been"	Don Henry, Jon Vezner	3:44

== Personnel ==
Compiled from liner notes.

=== Musicians ===
- Kathy Mattea – lead vocals, harmony vocals (1, 9)
- Pete Wasner – acoustic piano (1, 4)
- Matt Rollings – keyboards (5), acoustic piano (8, 10)
- Pat Flynn — acoustic guitar (1, 4–6), acoustic rhythm guitar (8)
- Ray Flacke – electric guitar (2, 3, 7, 9)
- Chris Leuzinger – acoustic guitar (2, 3, 7, 9), electric guitar (2, 4–6)
- Robert Bowlin – acoustic guitar (8)
- John Mock – acoustic guitar (10)
- Mark O'Connor – mandolin (1)
- Bruce Bouton – steel guitar (3, 6, 8, 9)
- Jerry Douglas – dobro (7)
- Bob Wray – bass (1, 2, 4–8)
- Mike Chapman – bass (3)
- Mike Leech – bass (9)
- Edgar Meyer – acoustic bass (10)
- Dave Pomeroy – electric bass (10)
- Milton Sledge – drums (1–9)
- Kenny Malone – percussion (1, 2)
- Bobby Wood – percussion (1), keyboards (4, 8, 9), acoustic piano (6, 8), organ (6)
- Stuart Duncan – fiddle (2, 9), mandolin (7)
- Charlie McCoy – harmonica (2, 5, 6)
- Craig Bickhardt – harmony vocals (1)
- Donna McElroy – harmony vocals (1)
- Wayland Patton – harmony vocals (1, 4, 7, 8)
- Riders in the Sky – harmony vocals (2)
- Kathy Chiavola – harmony vocals (4, 7, 8)
- Jim Photoglo – harmony vocals (5, 6)
- Wendy Waldman – harmony vocals (5)
- Claire Lynch – harmony vocals (6)
- Tim O'Brien – harmony vocals (9)

=== Production ===
- Allen Reynolds – producer
- Mark Miller – recording, mixing
- Duke Duczer – recording assistant, mix assistant
- Denny Purcell – mastering at Georgetown Masters (Nashville, Tennessee)
- Barnes & Company – album graphics
- Bill Barnes – art direction, design
- Elizabeth Barker White – silhouette artwork
- Peter Nash – photography
- Valerie Cole – make-up
- Darrell Jones – hair
- Bev Riedel-Patterson – hair
- Sherri McCoy – wardrobe styling
- Ann Rice – wardrobe styling
- Bob Titley – management

== Charts ==
=== Weekly charts ===
Chart (1989–1990)	Peak position
Canadian Country Albums (RPM)	28
US Billboard 200	82
US Top Country Albums (Billboard)	6

=== Year-end charts ===
Chart (1989)	Position
US Top Country Albums (Billboard)	40
Chart (1990)	Position
US Top Country Albums (Billboard)	8

== Certifications ==
Region	Certification	Certified units/sales
United States (RIAA)	Gold	500,000^{^}
^{^} Shipments figures based on certification alone.

== Release history ==
Release history and formats for Willow in the Wind
Region	Date	Format	Label	Ref.
North America	April 4, 1989	LP; CD; cassette	PolyGram; Mercury Records	
