= Maybe She's Human =

Single by Kathy Mattea

from the album Walking Away a Winner
- B-side: "Who Turned Out the Light"
- Released: November 12, 1994
- Genre: Country
- Length: 3:07
- Label: Mercury
- Songwriter(s): Kent Robbins, Layng Martine Jr.
- Producer(s): Josh Leo

Kathy Mattea singles chronology
"Nobody's Gonna Rain on Our Parade" (1994)	"Maybe She's Human" (1994)	"Clown in Your Rodeo" (1995)

"Maybe She's Human" is a song recorded by American country music artist Kathy Mattea. It was released in November 1994 as the third single from the album Walking Away a Winner. The song reached No. 34 on the Billboard Hot Country Singles & Tracks chart. The song was written by Kent Robbins and Layng Martine Jr.

== Chart performance ==
Chart (1994)	Peak position
US Hot Country Songs (Billboard)	34
Canadian RPM Country Tracks	36
