= Untasted Honey =

Studio album by Kathy Mattea
- Released: September 28, 1987
- Studio: Jack's Tracks (Nashville, Tennessee)
- Genre: Country
- Length: 33:57
- Label: Mercury; PolyGram
- Producer: Allen Reynolds

Kathy Mattea chronology
Walk the Way the Wind Blows (1986)	Untasted Honey (1987)	Willow in the Wind (1989)

Singles from Untasted Honey
- 1. "Goin' Gone" Released: September 1987; 2. "Eighteen Wheels and a Dozen Roses" Released: March 12, 1988; 3. "Untold Stories" Released: July 9, 1988; 4. "Life as We Knew It" Released: November 12, 1988

Professional ratings
Review scores
Source	Rating
AllMusic	3/5 stars
The Rolling Stone Album Guide	1992

Untasted Honey is the fourth studio album by American country music artist Kathy Mattea. It was released in 1987 on Mercury Records. The album produced Mattea's first Number One hit on the Billboard country charts in its lead-off single "Goin' Gone". Following this song was another Number One hit, "Eighteen Wheels and a Dozen Roses", then "Untold Stories" and "Life as We Knew It", both of which reached #4. "The Battle Hymn of Love" was later released as a single from Mattea's 1990 album A Collection of Hits. Like Walk the Way the Wind Blows before it, this album includes a cut originally found on Nanci Griffith's 1986 album The Last of the True Believers, this time in the track "Goin' Gone". Untasted Honey was certified gold by the RIAA.

== Track listing ==
No.	Title	Writer(s)	Length
1.	"Untold Stories"	Tim O'Brien	3:05
2.	"Life as We Knew It"	Walter Carter, Fred Koller	3:20
3.	"Eighteen Wheels and a Dozen Roses"	Gene Nelson, Paul Nelson	3:23
4.	"The Battle Hymn of Love" (duet with Tim O'Brien)	Paul Overstreet, Don Schlitz	2:55
5.	"Late in the Day"	O'Brien	4:31
6.	"Goin' Gone"	Pat Alger, Bill Dale, Fred Koller	4:28
7.	"Untasted Honey"	Craig Bickhardt, Barry Alfonso	3:26
8.	"Like a Hurricane"	Alger, Mark D. Sanders	3:31
9.	"As Long as I Have a Heart"	Don Henry, Dennis Wilson	3:03
10.	"Every Love"	Kye Fleming, Janis Ian	2:58

== Personnel ==
- Kathy Mattea – vocals, backing vocals (1, 2, 7)
- Buck White – acoustic piano (1)
- Pete Wasner – acoustic piano (3–5), organ (3), electric piano (8)
- Bobby Wood – organ (4, 6), acoustic piano (6, 7)
- Ray Flacke – acoustic guitar (1), electric guitar (1)
- Nick Forster – acoustic guitar (1), electric lead guitar (1)
- Pat Flynn – acoustic guitar (2–7, 9), acoustic rhythm guitar (8)
- Tim O'Brien – acoustic guitar (1), mandolin (1), backing vocals (1, 2), vocals (4)
- Chris Leuzinger – acoustic rhythm guitar (2–6), electric rhythm guitar (3, 4, 6), electric guitar (8)
- Pat Alger – acoustic guitar (10)
- Jerry Douglas – dobro (2)
- David Schaufer – dulcimer (2)
- Bruce Bouton – steel guitar (3, 5)
- Bob Wray – bass (1, 2, 6–8)
- Mike Leech – bass (3–5)
- Roy Huskey Jr. – bass (9)
- Dave Pomeroy – bass (10)
- Milton Sledge – drums (1–6, 8), percussion (1)
- Kenny Malone – drums (7, 9), percussion (7, 9)
- Craig Duncan – hammered dulcimer (4)
- Cindy Reynolds-Wyatt – harp (10)
- Beth Nielsen Chapman – backing vocals (3, 4, 6–9)
- Craig Bickhardt – backing vocals (3, 6, 7), acoustic guitar (7)
- John Thompson – backing vocals (7, 9)

Production

- Allen Reynolds – producer
- Mark Miller – engineer, mixing
- Denny Purcell – mastering at Georgetown Masters (Nashville, Tennessee)
- Barnes & Company – album graphics
- Billy Barnes – art direction, design
- Matthew Barnes – design
- Deb Mahalanobis – design
- Frank Waggoner – hand lettering
- Jim "Señor" McGuire – photography
- Cheryl Riddle – hair
- Valerie Cole – make-up
- Anne Payne – wardrobe coordinator
- Bob Titley – management

== Charts ==
=== Weekly charts ===
Chart (1987–1988)	Peak position
US Top Country Albums (Billboard)	11

=== Year-end charts ===
Chart (1988)	Position
US Top Country Albums (Billboard)	18
Chart (1989)	Position
US Top Country Albums (Billboard)	43

== Release history ==
Release history and formats for Untasted Honey
Region	Date	Format	Label	Ref.
North America	September 28, 1987	LP; CD; cassette	PolyGram; Mercury Records	
