= Darryl Rhoades =

American musician and comedian (born 1950)

- Born: June 7, 1950 (age 76)
- Origin: Louisville, Kentucky
- Genre: Rock Comedy Country
- Occupations: Singer-songwriter, comedian
- Years active: 1975–present
- Website: www.music-comedy.com

Darryl Rhoades (born June 7, 1950) is an American musician and comedian.

== Early life and education ==
Rhoades is from Louisville, Kentucky. His family was relocated to Forest Park, Georgia, a suburb south of Atlanta where he attended high school at the age of 13.

== Career ==
Rhoades' musical career began in 1968 when he was a senior in high school as the drummer in a cover band, Celestial Voluptuous Banana, that played the Catacombs and Piedmont Park along with other bands such as the Hampton Grease Band. By 1975 he had formed the Hahavishnu Orchestra, a 12-piece musical comedy troupe which performed nationally until 1978. The music of the Orchestra is often compared to The Fugs, Frank Zappa and even The Tubes. The group's name is wordplay on the name of John McLaughlin's 1970s jazz fusion group The Mahavishnu Orchestra.

During this period, Kurt Loder (of Rolling Stone and later also MTV) was quoted proclaiming Rhoades as "one of the most savagely gifted writer/performers in the country today".

On New Year's Eve 1977, Rhoades and the orchestra appeared on the James Brown Future Shock television show on fledgling WTBS. In January 1978, Rhoades performed with the opening act for the American debut of the Sex Pistols. Rhoades' first LP, Burgers From Heaven, was released in 1979. Its title song appears in the Jim Varney film, Fast Food (1988). Rhoades performed the title song on the now cult classic Bill Tush WTBS late-night comedy sketch show Tush during 1980–81 in the early days of cable television. The music was performed as the Idolators on Georgia Championship Wrestling as the ring music for wrestler Austin Idol. The Outlaws recorded a cover of Rhoades' "The Lights Are On (But Nobody's Home)" on the 1979 album In The Eye of the Storm.

Although the period 1981–1984 is obscure for Rhoades, by 1985, he assembled The Men from Glad and released his second LP, Better Dead Than Mellow. In 1989, Rhoades began his comedy career.

In 1991 he released Before and After His Time, a compilation of his first three albums. In 1992 he released his fifth album, Cowpokin' & Udder Love Songs, which received airplay across the US.

Working continuously and receiving airplay from syndicated radio shows such as The Dr. Demento Show and The John Boy & Billy Big Show helped to create a large fanbase, leaving little time for Rhoades to perform with musical groups. He performs on rare occasions as the drummer for The Electrifyin' Sissies, which include record producer Brendan O'Brien, Rick Richards from the Georgia Satellites, and radio personality/rock historian Rex Patton.

In 1994 he released his sixth LP, The Lean Years 1950–1994. The album received even more airplay with his infamous U Suck Beer commercials which have become his trademark in his stand-up performances. In April 1999 he released his seventh LP titled Radio Daze...The Shroud of Tourin'. This CD is a parody of radio deejays from all over the US, with satire of bad gospel music, commercials, and unfunny morning radio shows. Close to 40 different performers appear on the album.

In May 2001, Rhoades released Rhoades....All Over The Map, his eighth comedy and music recording. As its title alludes, the album contains various musical styles such as jazz, country, swing, heavy metal, rockabilly and more. Also, on this CD are versions of a couple of his songs recorded live in a rare radio interview and recorded live stand-up from the Punchline comedy club in Atlanta.

In 2008, Rhoades released his eleventh CD Weapons of Mass Deception which features Peter Stroud and Tim Smith (Sheryl Crow Band), Rick Richards (Georgia Satellites), Col. Bruce Hampton (multiple legendary groups and the film Slingblade) Deborah Reece (former Randall Bramblett band member) and other southern musicians.

On September 12, 2009, Rhoades regrouped many of the original members of the Hahavishnu Orchestra for a celebration at the Variety Playhouse in Atlanta. Also in 2009, Rhoades played drums in the Santa Fe scenes in the 2010 academy winning movie, Crazy Heart.

In 2014 Rhoades released another album, Teenagers in Heat, that is part sketch comedy, part social satire, part rock 'n' roll scrapbook.

In 2017, Rhoades released his LP, The Last Goodbye, recorded in Atlanta and co-produced by Martin Kearns with multiple musicians from the south. The album was a showcase for multi genre songwriting including bossa nova, pop, country, bluegrass and spoken word.

In April 2024, Rhoades released his self-penned memoir, The Road To Almost....The Lean Years 1950–2024. The book includes stories from his childhood in Kentucky, growing up in Atlanta and avoiding delinquency after he heard live bands and became obsessed with music. The book covers his years of touring with the Hahavishnu Orchestra, The Mighty Men from Glad and playing behind iconic musicians such as Chuck Berry, Jerry Lee Lewis, Buck Owens and many others. The many interviews about the book on NPR, podcasts and syndicated shows like The Bob & Sheri Show led to a multitude of write-ups in The Atlanta Magazine, The Atlanta Journal-Constitution and other online publications boosting book sales and exposure to a new national fanbase.

Rhoades continues to perform live in his one-man shows, as well as standup comedy, songwriter's platforms and collaborations with one of Atlanta's best guitarist, Tommy Strain.

== Discography ==
- Burgers From Heaven, 1980
- Better Dead Than Mellow, 1985
- No Glove / No Love, 1988
- Before & After His Time (compilation), 1991
- Cowpokin & Udder Love Songs, 1992
- The Lean Years 1950–1994, 1994
- Radio Daze...The Shroud of Tourin', 1999
- Rhoades...All Over The Map, 2001
- The Shadow You Cast (Depends on Where You Stand), 2003
- Raparations, 2005
- Weapons of Mass Deception, 2008
- Teenagers in Heat, 2015
- The Last Goodbye, 2017

== Also recorded with ==
- Reverend Billy C. Wirtz
- Chip Taylor & The Idolators
