= Walk the Way the Wind Blows =

Studio album by Kathy Mattea
- Released: March 20, 1986
- Recorded: 1985
- Studio: Jack's Tracks (Nashville, Tennessee)
- Genre: Country
- Length: 34:31
- Label: Mercury/PolyGram
- Producer: Allen Reynolds

Kathy Mattea chronology
From My Heart (1985)	Walk the Way the Wind Blows (1986)	Untasted Honey (1987)

Singles from Walk the Way the Wind Blows
- 1. "Love at the Five and Dime" Released: April 12, 1986; 2. "Walk the Way the Wind Blows" Released: September 13, 1986; 3. "You're the Power" Released: February 7, 1987; 4. "Train of Memories" Released: May 23, 1987

Professional ratings
Review scores
Source	Rating
AllMusic	3/5 stars
The Rolling Stone Album Guide	2.5/5 stars

Walk the Way the Wind Blows is the third studio album by American country music singer Kathy Mattea. It was released in 1986 (see 1986 in country music) on Mercury Records. This album produced Mattea's first Top Ten country hit in "Love at the Five and Dime", which reached #3 on the Billboard country charts. Following this song were three more Top Ten hits: the title track at #10, "You're the Power" at #5, and "Train of Memories" at #6.

"Love at the Five and Dime", which features backing vocals from Don Williams, was also recorded by Nanci Griffith on her 1986 album The Last of the True Believers. "Song for the Life" has been covered by several artists, and was originally recorded by Rodney Crowell on his 1977 debut Ain't Livin' Long Like This. This song would later be released in 1995 as a single by Alan Jackson.

== Track listing ==
No.	Title	Writer(s)	Length
1.	"Walk the Way the Wind Blows"	Tim O'Brien	3:43
2.	"Train of Memories"	Andy Byrd, Jimbeau Hinson	2:48
3.	"Reason to Live"	Joanne Christy, Johnny Pierce, Geoff Levin	3:21
4.	"Evenin'"	Mitchell Parish, Harry White	3:34
5.	"Leaving West Virginia"	Kathy Mattea	3:43
6.	"Love at the Five and Dime"	Nanci Griffith	3:36
7.	"You Plant Your Fields"	Wendy Waldman, Donny Lowery	3:08
8.	"Back Up Grinnin' Again"	David Goodman	3:02
9.	"You're the Power"	Craig Bickhardt, F. C. Collins	3:02
10.	"Song for the Life"	Rodney Crowell	3:59

== Personnel ==
- Kathy Mattea – lead vocals, backing vocals (2, 8, 9), acoustic guitar (5)
- Bobby Wood – keyboards (1, 3, 4, 6–10)
- Flip Anderson – organ (3)
- Bill Donohue – acoustic piano (5)
- Bessyl Duhon – accordion (8)
- Pat Flynn – acoustic guitar (1–4, 6–10)
- Tim O'Brien – acoustic guitar (1, 4), mandolin (1)
- Brent Rowan – electric guitar (1)
- Ray Flacke – electric guitar (2, 4, 6)
- Chris Leuzinger – acoustic guitar (2, 6, 8), electric guitar (3, 10)
- John Jackson – electric guitar (5)
- Bruce Bouton – steel guitar (1, 6)
- Béla Fleck – banjo (2, 4)
- Jerry Douglas – dobro (5, 8)
- Susan Taylor – cuatro (7)
- Bob Wray – bass (1–4, 6–10)
- Charlie Anderson – bass (5)
- Milton Sledge – drums (1–4, 6–10), percussion (2)
- Tommy Cozart – drums (5)
- Kenny Malone – percussion (1, 6, 8, 9)
- Mark O'Connor – fiddle (1)
- Buddy Spicher – fiddle (8)
- Jim Horn – saxophones (2)
- Quitman Dennis – trombone (2)
- Wayne Jackson – trumpet (2)
- Charlie McCoy – harmonica (5), glass harmonica (10)
- Roy Christensen – cello (9)
- Mike Leech – cello arrangements (9)
- Craig Bickhardt – backing vocals (1, 2, 8, 9), acoustic guitar (9)
- Wendy Waldman – backing vocals (1, 7), acoustic guitar (7)
- Vince Gill – harmony vocals (3)
- Don Williams – harmony vocals (6)
- Jim Photoglo – backing vocals (7)

=== Production ===
- Allen Reynolds – producer
- Mark Miller – engineer, mixing
- Denny Purcell – mastering at Georgetown Masters (Nashville, Tennessee)
- Barnes & Company – album graphics
- Bill Barnes – art direction, concept
- Deb Mahalanobis – design, hand lettering
- Jim "Señor" McGuire – photography
- Bob Titley – management

== Chart performance ==
Chart (1986)	Peak position
US Top Country Albums (Billboard)	13

== Release history ==
Release history and formats for Walk the Way the Wind Blows
Region	Date	Format	Label	Ref.
North America	March 20, 1986	LP; CD; cassette	PolyGram; Mercury Records	
