= Angelo Marre House =

Historic house in Arkansas, United States

- U.S. National Register of Historic Places
- U.S. Historic district – Contributing property
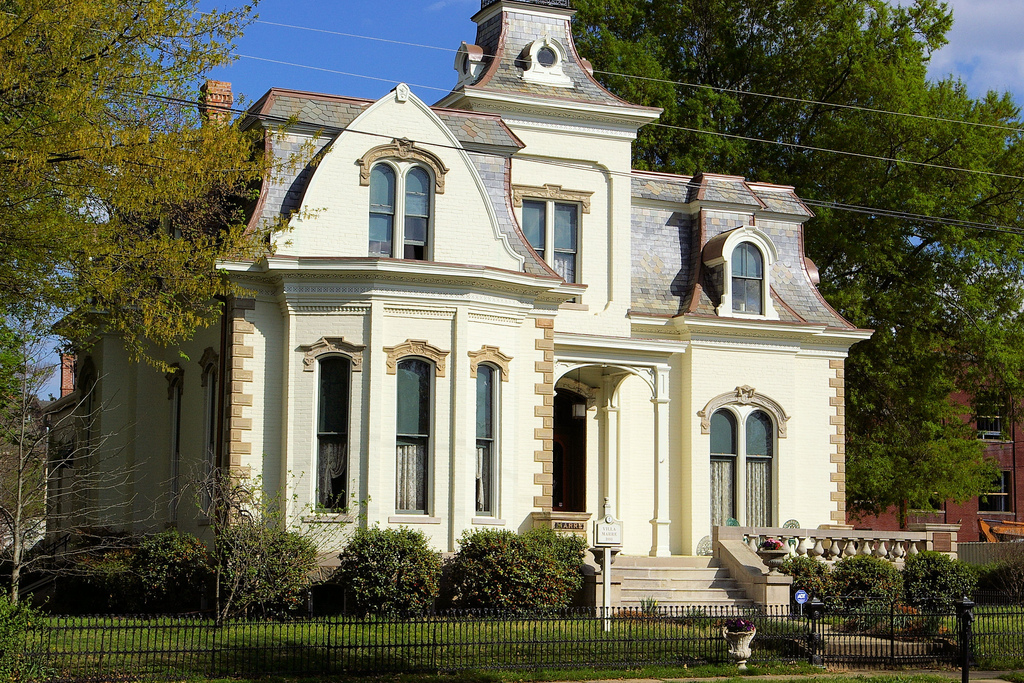

- Location within Arkansas Location within the United States
- Location: 1321 Scott St., Little Rock, Arkansas
- Coordinates: 34.73536552880382°N 92.2713348649997°W
- Area: less than one acre
- Built: 1882
- Architectural style: Italianate
- Part of: MacArthur Park Historic District (ID77000269)
- NRHP reference No.: 70000128

Significant dates
- Added to NRHP: June 15, 1970
- Designated CP: July 25, 1977

The Angelo Marre House, also known as Villa Marre, is a historic house at 1321 Scott Street in Little Rock, Arkansas. It is a high style Italianate house, two stories in height, with a flared mansard roof and a 2 1/2-story tower set above its entry. Built of painted brick, it has been a landmark of the city since its construction, and has had at least two notable occupants: Jeff Davis, a Governor of Arkansas, and Edgar Burton Kinsworthy, a state attorney general and long-serving state senator.

The house was listed on the National Register of Historic Places in 1970.

The home was used for exterior shots of Sugarbaker & Associates Interior Design on the television series Designing Women. It was also used for an exterior shot of the Pittsburgh home of Jennifer Bloom in the 2006 television miniseries The Lost Room.

== See also ==
- National Register of Historic Places listings in Little Rock, Arkansas
