= Nobody's Gonna Rain on Our Parade =

Single by Kathy Mattea

from the album Walking Away a Winner
- B-side: "Grand Canyon"
- Released: July 18, 1994
- Genre: Country
- Length: 3:30
- Label: Mercury Nashville
- Songwriters: Will Rambeaux, Brad Parker
- Producer: Josh Leo

Kathy Mattea singles chronology
"Walking Away a Winner" (1994)	"Nobody's Gonna Rain on Our Parade" (1994)	"Maybe She's Human" (1994)

"Nobody's Gonna Rain on Our Parade" is a song written by Will Rambeaux and Brad Parker, and recorded by American country music artist Kathy Mattea. It was released in July 1994 as the second single from the album Walking Away a Winner. The song reached number 13 on the Billboard Hot Country Singles & Tracks chart and peaked at number 8 on the Canadian RPM Country Tracks chart.

== Music video ==
The music video was directed by Steven Goldmann and premiered in 1994.

== Chart performance ==
"Nobody's Gonna Rain on Our Parade" debuted at number 71 on the U.S. Billboard Hot Country Singles & Tracks for the week of July 23, 1994.

Chart (1994)	Peak position
Canada Country Singles (RPM)	8
US Hot Country Songs (Billboard)	13

=== Year-end charts ===
Chart (1994)	Position
Canada Country Tracks (RPM)	86
