= Jan Hooks =

American actress and comedian (1957–2014)

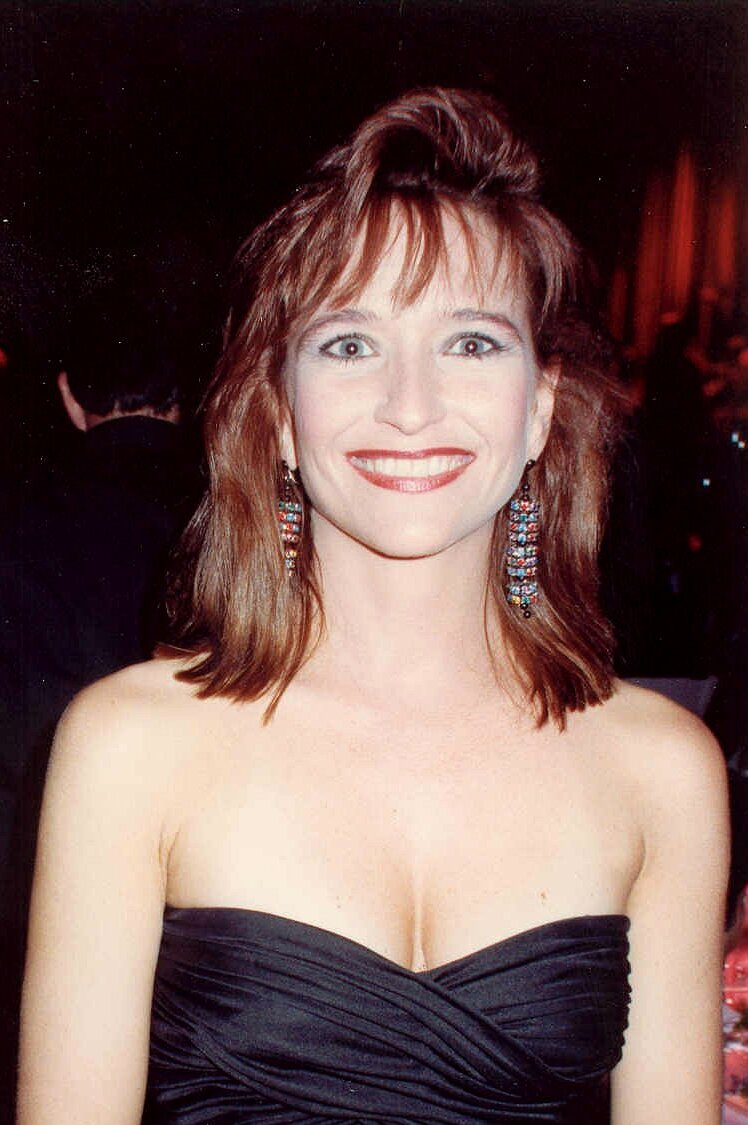
- Hooks at the 1988 Emmy Awards
- Born: Janet Vivian Hooks; April 23, 1957; Decatur, Georgia, U.S.
- Died: October 9, 2014 (aged 57); Woodstock, New York, U.S.
- Occupations: Actress; comedian
- Years active: 1980–2014

Janet Vivian Hooks (April 23, 1957 – October 9, 2014) was an American actress and comedian. She was best known for her tenure on the NBC sketch comedy series Saturday Night Live, where she was a repertory player from 1986 to 1991. After leaving SNL, she continued to make cameo appearances until 1994. Her subsequent work included a regular role on the last two seasons of Designing Women, a recurring role on 3rd Rock from the Sun, and a number of other film and television roles, including on 30 Rock and The Simpsons. She died of complications of throat cancer on October 9, 2014 at the age of 57.

== Early life ==
Hooks was born and raised in Decatur, Georgia, where she attended Canby Lane Elementary School and Towers High School. In 1974, her junior year, she moved to Fort Myers, Florida area, when her father, a Sears employee, was transferred. She attended Cypress Lake High School, in Ft. Myers, Florida, made her stage debut in a play there, and graduated in 1975. She studied at Florida SouthWestern State College and later University of West Florida where she majored in theatre, but left to pursue acting full-time.

== Career ==
Hooks began her career as a member of the Los Angeles-based comedy troupe the Groundlings and in an Atlanta nightclub act called the Wit's End Players, a continuation of the Dick Van Dyke and Phil Erickson troupe Merry Mutes, which also included Joanne Daniels.

From 1980 to 1981, Hooks appeared in Bill Tush's Tush on Ted Turner's television station, WTBS, which eventually became TBS.

In 1983, Victoria Jackson, Arsenio Hall, Vic Dunlop, Barry Diamond, John Moschitta Jr., John Paragon, and Hooks appeared on Dick Clark's and Chris Bearde's short-lived NBC series The 1/2 Hour Comedy Hour.

In 1983-1984, Hooks gained attention on the HBO comedy series Not Necessarily the News and made guest appearances on Comedy Tonight and the 1985 syndicated TV show Comedy Break with Mack & Jamie, with Kevin Pollak. In 1985, she made her film debut in Pee-wee's Big Adventure as a tour guide at the Alamo. She would later appear in the Goldie Hawn film Wildcats (1986).

In 1985, Hooks met with producer Lorne Michaels about a spot on Saturday Night Live, but was passed over in favor of Joan Cusack. After the show's 1985–86 season was deemed a ratings disaster and the show was slated for cancellation, Michaels offered Hooks another chance. This time, despite a six-minute audition she called "brutal", she was offered a contract along with fellow new recruits Dana Carvey, Phil Hartman, Victoria Jackson and Kevin Nealon for the show's 1986–87 season. They helped lead the show to a sustained ratings increase and a return to the national spotlight. Hooks's characters included Candy Sweeney of the Sweeney Sisters. She also played famous political wives of the era, including Nancy Reagan, Hillary Clinton, Kitty Dukakis, Betty Ford, and Elizabeth Dole, and did notable impressions of Bette Davis, Sinéad O'Connor, Tammy Faye Bakker, Ivana Trump, Kathie Lee Gifford, and Diane Sawyer.

I had a huge ego. I just loved anybody that wanted me to show my stuff. I will do it. Oh man, let me go out there and show my stuff. And in my mid-twenties, it kind of hit that it wasn't a hobby anymore, that it was my vocation, that I had to do this in order to live. And that shaded it in a whole different way. It made me afraid, you know....The show changed my life, obviously. But I have horrible stage fright. And with all these, you know, stand-up comics who I love — you know, Dana and Dennis and Kevin and all these people — you know they wanted their shot, they wanted to get in there and do it, but I was one of the ones that between dress and air was sitting in the corner going, "Please cut everything I'm in!" — Jan Hooks, in Live From New York (2002/2014)

Tiring of the stress of performing on a live show, Hooks left SNL in 1991 after being asked by Linda Bloodworth-Thomason to replace Jean Smart on the CBS sitcom Designing Women. Hooks played Carlene Dobber for the show's final two seasons. She also continued to make occasional appearances on SNL through 1994, usually playing Hillary Clinton.

Hooks continued to work in supporting roles and guest appearances for several years, but with declining frequency. She had a recurring role as Vicki Dubcek on 3rd Rock from the Sun, which earned her an Emmy Award nomination. She guest-starred on two Matt Groening-produced cartoons for the Fox Broadcasting Company: six episodes of The Simpsons between 1997 and 2002, as Apu's wife Manjula (although Tress MacNeille sometimes substituted for her, and eventually replaced her), and in the Futurama episode "Bendless Love", as the voice of the robot Angleyne. She starred as Dixie Glick in the series Primetime Glick and the movie Jiminy Glick in Lalawood. She had small parts in several other movies, including Batman Returns (1992) as Jen, the Penguin's image consultant during his campaign to become mayor of Gotham City. Her final on-screen appearances were in two episodes of 30 Rock in 2010, playing Jenna Maroney's mother, Verna. She guest-starred in the 2013 The Cleveland Show episode "Mr. and Mrs. Brown", her final acting job.

According to a 2014 Grantland article about her career and death, Hooks's anxiety about acting and passive approach to her career led to her missing out on prestigious auditions and lucrative acting roles. Hooks turned down a role in the 2003 television film The Music Man (which went to Molly Shannon) and declined to reprise her SNL sketch "The Sweeney Sisters" with Nora Dunn in a special appearance at Carnegie Hall in 2014. Hooks's friend Bill Tush speculated that her drinking had made her indifferent toward her career, but also said she might not have wanted more money or fame. Another friend said that Hooks had decided to work only enough to keep her Screen Actors Guild health insurance.

Following Hooks' death, Tina Fey said that she was angry that Hooks had not had a more successful career, adding that Hooks had been a bigger star on SNL than Rob Schneider and should have had at least as big of a film career as he did. However, Hooks's friend, film critic Ann Hornaday, said, "It's not like she had doors slammed in her face. A lot of times, she wouldn't even get as far as the door [by] her own choice."

== Personal life ==
Hooks was dating Kevin Nealon when they were both hired by Saturday Night Live.

== Death ==
Hooks was diagnosed with leukemia in February 2009, which was treated over several months and went into remission that May. In April 2014, Hooks discovered a bump on her throat. A biopsy confirmed she had throat cancer, and Hooks was treated at Memorial Sloan Kettering Cancer Center. The tumor was deemed unresponsive to chemotherapy and continued to grow. Doctors said the only remaining option was a total laryngectomy, which Hooks declined. She arranged for hospice care and used prescription drugs, wine, and cigarettes to manage the pain. Her ability to speak, eat, and breathe declined.

Hooks died of throat cancer complications on October 9, 2014, at age 57. Her remains were interred in Northview Cemetery in Cedartown, Georgia.

The Simpsons episode "Super Franchise Me" memorialized her on October 12, 2014, with her longtime character Manjula Nahasapeemapetilon honored in the credits.

=== "Love Is a Dream" ===
SNL paid tribute to Hooks in the third episode of its 40th season on October 11, 2014. Guest host Bill Hader and Kristen Wiig introduced a tribute in which SNL re-aired a short she had filmed with Phil Hartman in 1988, "Love Is a Dream". This short film had also been re-aired to honor Hartman following his death in 1998. It is described as "a sweet and melodramatic tribute to the 1948 film The Emperor Waltz, which was directed by Billy Wilder and starred Bing Crosby and Joan Fontaine. The scene casts Hooks as an aging woman who vanishes into her own imagination to sing and share a dance with a long-lost lover (Hartman). Hooks and Hartman appear to lip-sync to the original singing voices from the 1948 film. One critic wrote that the "Jan Hooks tribute showed that Jan did not need to be funny in order to captivate the attention of her audience", as Hooks and Hartman were known to be quiet and reserved off screen.

== Filmography ==
=== Film ===
Year	Title	Role	Notes
1985	Pee-wee's Big Adventure	Tina	
1986	Wildcats	Stephanie Needham	
1987	Funland	Shelly Willingham	
1992	Batman Returns	Jen	
1993	Coneheads	Gladys Johnson	
1993	A Dangerous Woman	Makeup Girl	
1998	Simon Birch	Miss Agnes Leavey	
2004	Jiminy Glick in Lalawood	Dixie Glick	

=== Television ===
Year	Title	Role	Notes
1980	Tush	Various characters	
1983	Prime Times	Various characters	TV special
1983	The 1/2 Hour Comedy Hour	Various characters	
1983–1984	Not Necessarily the News	Various characters	24 episodes
1984	The Joe Piscopo Special	Various characters	TV special
1985	That Was The Week That Was	Various characters	TV special
1985	Comedy Break	Various characters	
1986–1994	Saturday Night Live	Various characters	102 episodes
1989	Dear John	Suzanne	Episode: "John's Blind Date"
1991–1993	Designing Women	Carlene Frazier Dobber	45 episodes
1992	Frosty Returns	Lil DeCarlo	Voice; TV special
1994	The Martin Short Show	Meg Harper Short	
1996	The Dana Carvey Show	Kathie Lee Gifford	Episode: "The Diet Mug Root Beer Dana Carvey Show"
1996–2000	3rd Rock from the Sun	Vicki Dubcek	16 episodes
1997	Hiller and Diller	Kate	2 episodes
1997–2002	The Simpsons	Manjula Nahasapeemapetilon	Voice; 6 episodes
2001	Providence	Doreen Dunfey	Episode 3.10: "The Gun"
2001	Futurama	Anglelyne	Voice; Episode: "Bendless Love"
2001–2003	Primetime Glick	Dixie Glick	6 episodes
2004	Game Over	Nadine	Voice; Episode: "Monkey Dearest"
2010	30 Rock	Verna Maroney	2 episodes
2013	The Cleveland Show	Mrs. Kellogg	Voice; Episode: "Mr. and Mrs. Brown"
2014	Fish Hooks	Savannah Salmonds	Voice; Episode: "Camp Camp"; final role

== See also ==
- Saturday Night Live parodies of Hillary Clinton
