= Saturday Night Live parodies of Hillary Clinton =

The sketch comedy television show Saturday Night Live (SNL) has for almost three decades aired a number of sketches parodying Hillary Clinton, from her time as First Lady, and during both her presidential campaigns in 2008 and 2016.

A total of nine different performers have played Hillary Clinton on SNL. The array of SNL cast members portraying Clinton has included Jan Hooks, Janeane Garofalo, Vanessa Bayer, Ana Gasteyer, Amy Poehler, and Kate McKinnon. Guest stars playing Clinton have included Drew Barrymore and Rachel Dratch. One sketch featured Miley Cyrus in a guest appearance as Clinton, rapping: "What's up y'all? I'm like Hillary Clinton, and I wanna be president one day."

== History ==
Jan Hooks was the first to portray Hillary Clinton, and after Hooks left the show in 1991, she returned later to make several subsequent guest appearances as Hillary, with Phil Hartman as Hillary's husband Bill Clinton. One of the earliest Jan Hooks sketches, which aired in May 1993, features her interpretation of Hillary eager to be a "co-president" with Bill, now the newly elected president. Hooks' Hillary tells her husband about her big plans for his health care bill, and gets into a fistfight with Senator Bob Dole (Dan Aykroyd).

Beginning with the 1994 season, Janeane Garofalo played Hillary as First Lady, with Michael McKean portraying president Clinton.

Ana Gasteyer played Hillary during the Lewinsky scandal of the late 1990s, as well as during her run for the U.S. Senate in New York, with Darrell Hammond playing the role of her husband. In one Gasteyer sketch, set in the Clintons' Chappaqua kitchen, with Hillary making an attempt to appear more personable for the cameras during her Senate campaign, she says, "I can't wait to prepare some food dishes in this kitchen, such as salads and toast."

SNL cast member Amy Poehler had the longest-running role as Clinton, playing the role regularly from 2003 to 2008 (and reprising it twice, in 2012 and 2015). During the 2008–09 season, the show aired several critically acclaimed sketches featuring Poehler as Clinton, and Tina Fey as Sarah Palin. Hillary Clinton first made an appearance on the show and faced off with Poehler as her doppelgänger.

Kate McKinnon has portrayed Clinton since March 2015, first appearing in a new series of Hillary Clinton sketches in SNL's 2014–2015 season, after Clinton announced her candidacy for the 2016 presidential campaign. Former SNL cast member and current announcer Darrell Hammond returned to reprise his portrayal of Bill Clinton, agreeing to do so because McKinnon was a "virtuoso".

McKinnon again portrayed Clinton on October 17, 2015, for SNL's rendering of the Democratic Primary Presidential debate which had aired on CNN on October 13. On December 19, 2015, McKinnon portrayed Clinton alongside co-hosts Amy Poehler and Tina Fey reprising their portrayals of Clinton and Sarah Palin, who had been transported through time from 2008. Poehler's Clinton notes that she needs to "send a bunch of emails" when she returns to 2008.

On October 8, 2016, in episode 2 of season 42, McKinnon played Hillary Clinton after her headquarters obtained news of Donald Trump talking about how he could grab women "by the pussy", something he did say in real life.
