= Walking Away a Winner =

Studio album by Kathy Mattea
- Released: May 17, 1994
- Studio: Emerald Sound Studios and Recording Arts (Nashville, Tennessee); Rumbo Recorders (Los Angeles, California)
- Genre: Country; pop rock
- Length: 34:35
- Label: Mercury; PolyGram
- Producer: Josh Leo

Kathy Mattea chronology
Good News (1993)	Walking Away a Winner (1994)	Love Travels (1997)

Singles from Walking Away a Winner
- 1. "Walking Away a Winner" Released: March 26, 1994; 2. "Nobody's Gonna Rain on Our Parade" Released: July 18, 1994; 3. "Maybe She's Human" Released: November 12, 1994; 4. "Clown in Your Rodeo" Released: April 1, 1995

Walking Away a Winner is the ninth studio album by American country music artist, Kathy Mattea. It was released on May 17, 1994, via the Mercury/PolyGram labels and contained ten tracks of original material. The album's production featured a pop rock sound that was considered unique from Mattea's previous country-folk albums. Its title track was issued as the lead single and became her first top ten hit in several years on the American country chart. Three more singles were also commercially successful and the album sold more than 500,000 copies in the United States. Walking Away a Winner received mostly positive reception from critics. It also charted on the American country albums and Billboard 200 charts.

== Background ==
Kathy Mattea was among country music's most commercially successful artists during the late eighties and nineties. She had an uninterrupted string of top ten and top 20 singles on the North American country charts that exemplified a country folk musical style. This helped Mattea win several major industry accolades, including a Grammy Award and four number one singles. In 1992, Mattea released the album Lonesome Standard Time, which failed to yield the level of commercial success she previously achieved. In addition, she had vocal cord surgery. The surgery and recovery period caused Mattea to slow down more than she had been used to. She changed musical directions and began working alongside a new producer for her next album, Walking Away a Winner.

== Recording and content ==
Walking Away a Winner was recorded at Emerald Sound Studios, located in Nashville, Tennessee. The project was produced entirely by Josh Leo. A total of ten new songs comprised the album project. The album was a departure stylistically from Mattea's previous country-folk offerings. According to the Daily Press's Sam McDonald, the project "broke new ground" in its musical style. In similar vein to Mary Chapin Carpenter and Bonnie Raitt, the album offered a pop rock musical style with various story-lines in the ten tracks. In the title track, the main character walks away from a bad relationship. In the third selection, "Maybe She's Human", Mattea's character describes the challenges of being a wife and mother.

== Critical reception ==
Professional ratings
Review scores
Source	Rating
AllMusic	4/5 stars
Entertainment Weekly	B+

Walking Away a Winner received mostly positive responses from music critics and journalists. Thom Jurek of AllMusic rated the project four out of five stars. Jurek found the album's sound to be a departure from her previous work by showing "a side her country audience hadn't yet seen, and one that the adult contemporary and emerging AAA formats could embrace." Jurek also praised Mattea's vocal delivery and the way she can connect with lyrics in each song. He concluded by saying, "This is a winner indeed". In describing the album, Sam McDonald of the Daily Press positively noted that, "It offered quality without pandering to current country music tastes." Jack Hurst of the Chicago Tribune commented that it was "a meaty new album". Entertainment Weekly gave the album a B+ rating in its 1994 review.

== Release, chart performance and singles ==
Walking Away a Winner was released on May 17, 1994, on Mercury Records in conjunction with the PolyGram label. It was originally offered as both a compact disc and as a cassette. It was later re-issued digitally in the 2000s decade. The album was considered a "comeback" or "resurgence" for Mattea after her previous album was less successful. It became her sixth disc to sell over 500,000 copies in the United States, which prompted a gold certification from the Recording Industry Association of America. The album debuted on the American Billboard Top Country Albums chart on June 4, 1994. One week later, the disc peaked at number 12 on the country albums chart and spent a total of 37 weeks there. It also became Mattea's fourth disc to reach the Billboard 200, spending eight weeks in total and climbing to the number 87 position.

A total of four singles were spawned from Walking Away a Winner. The title track was the first single released, issued by PolyGram/Mercury on March 26, 1994. It became Mattea's first top ten single on the Billboard Hot Country Songs chart since 1991, climbing to the number three position in June 1994. It is also her final top ten single to date on the chart. On the Canadian RPM Country Tracks chart, the single climbed to number 16 around the same period. It was followed by the release of "Nobody's Gonna Rain on Our Parade" on July 18, 1994. On the Billboard country chart, it reached the top 20, peaking at number 13 in October 1994. On the RPM country chart, it reached the top ten, peaking at number eight. The third single was "Maybe She's Human", was released on November 12, 1994. The song reached the top 40 of the Billboard and RPM country charts, reaching number 34 and 36 respectively. The fourth and final single spawned was "Clown in Your Rodeo" on April 1, 1995. The song also reached the Billboard country top 20, climbing to the number 20 position in June 1995. On the RPM country chart, it only went to number 37.

== Track listing ==
CD and digital versions
No.	Title	Writer(s)	Length
1.	"Walking Away a Winner"	Bob DiPiero; Tom Shapiro	3:28
2.	"The Streets of Your Town"	Andrew Gold; Jenny Yates	3:51
3.	"Maybe She's Human"	Kent Robbins; Layng Martine Jr.	3:07
4.	"Clown in Your Rodeo"	Wayne Kirkpatrick	3:31
5.	"Who Turned Out the Light"	Lisa Angelle; Gold	3:34
6.	"Nobody's Gonna Rain on Our Parade"	Will Rambeaux; Brad Parker	3:37
7.	"Another Man"	Chris Waters; Chuck Jones	3:12
8.	"The Cape"	Jim Janosky; Guy Clark; Susanna Clark	2:36
9.	"Grand Canyon"	Kirkpatrick	4:19
10.	"Who's Gonna Know"	Jon Vezner	3:21
Total length:			34:35

== Personnel ==
All credits are adapted from the liner notes of Walking Away a Winner and AllMusic.

Musical personnel

- Kathy Mattea – vocals
- Bill Cuomo – keyboards (1–5, 7, 10), acoustic piano (6, 8, 9)
- Carl Marsh – keyboards (7, 9, 10)
- Dann Huff – electric guitars, guitar solo (6)
- Josh Leo – acoustic guitar (1–3, 5, 6, 8), electric guitar (6, 9), backwards guitar solo (9)
- Biff Watson – acoustic guitar
- Dan Dugmore – lap steel guitar (1, 2), steel guitar (3, 5–8), dobro (4)
- Jerry Douglas – dobro solo (4)
- Duncan Mullins – bass
- John Hammond – drums, percussion
- Tom Roady – percussion (7, 10)
- Sam Bush – fiddle (1)
- Jonathan Yudkin – fiddle (4)
- Bobby G. Taylor – oboe (3)
- Andrew Gold – backing vocals (2, 5)
- Wayne Kirkpatrick – backing vocals (4, 9), acoustic guitar (9)
- Timothy B. Schmit – backing vocals (4)
- Lisa Angelle – backing vocals (5)
- Karla Bonoff – backing vocals (6)
- Kenny Edwards – backing vocals (6)
- Wendy Waldman – backing vocals (6)
- Mary Ann Kennedy – backing vocals (7)
- Pam Rose – backing vocals (7)
- Hal Ketchum – backing vocals (8)

Production personnel

- Josh Leo – producer
- Steve Marcantonio – recording, mixing
- Russ Martin – second engineer
- Andy Udoff – second engineer, additional overdubs
- Don Cobb – digital editing
- Denny Purcell – mastering
- Georgetown Masters (Nashville, Tennessee) – editing and mastering location
- Joe Johnston – production coordinator
- Kim Markovchick – executive art direction
- Bill Barnes – art direction
- S. Watson – design
- Randee St. Nicholas – photography
- Bernhard Tamme – hair
- Jeanine Greville-Morris – make-up
- Paris Lorenz – wardrobe stylist
- Ann Rice – wardrobe stylist
- Titley & Associates – management

== Charts ==
Chart (1994)	Peak position
US Billboard 200	87
US Top Country Albums (Billboard)	12

== Certifications ==
Certifications for Walking Away a Winner
Region	Certification	Certified units/sales
United States (RIAA)	Gold	500,000^{^}
^{^} Shipments figures based on certification alone.

== Release history ==
Release history and formats for Walking Away a Winner
Region	Date	Format	Label	Ref.
Australia	May 17, 1994	CD	PolyGram; Mercury Records	
North America	May 17, 1994	CD; cassette	PolyGram; Mercury Records	
