= A Few Good Things Remain =

Single by Kathy Mattea

from the album A Collection of Hits
- B-side: "Evenin'"
- Released: November 10, 1990
- Genre: Country
- Length: 3:51
- Label: Mercury
- Songwriters: Jon Vezner, Pat Alger
- Producer: Allen Reynolds

Kathy Mattea singles chronology
"The Battle Hymn of Love" (1990)	"A Few Good Things Remain" (1990)	"Time Passes By" (1991)

"A Few Good Things Remain" is a song written by Jon Vezner and Pat Alger, and recorded by American country music artist Kathy Mattea. It was released in November 1990 as the second single from her compilation album A Collection of Hits. The song reached #9 on the Billboard Hot Country Singles & Tracks chart.

== Chart performance ==
Chart (1990–1991)	Peak position
Canada Country Singles (RPM)	7
US Hot Country Songs (Billboard)	9

=== Year-end charts ===
Chart (1991)	Position
Canada Country Tracks (RPM)	70
