= Designing Women =

American television sitcom (1986–1993)

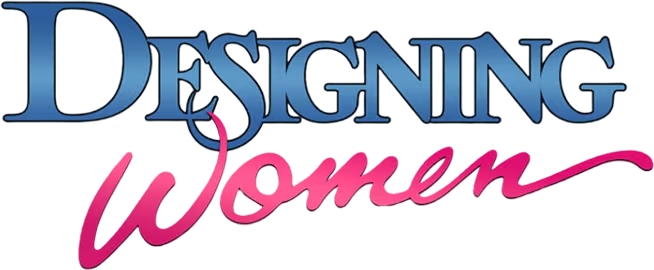
- Genre: Sitcom
- Created by: Linda Bloodworth-Thomason
- Starring: Dixie Carter; Annie Potts; Meshach Taylor; Delta Burke; Jean Smart; Alice Ghostley; Jan Hooks; Julia Duffy; Judith Ivey
- Opening theme: "Georgia on My Mind" (Performed by Doc Severinsen, seasons 1–2) (Performed by Bruce Miller, seasons 3–5) (Performed by Ray Charles, season 6)
- Country of origin: United States
- Original language: English
- No. of seasons: 7
- No. of episodes: 163 (list of episodes)

Production
- Camera setup: Multi-camera
- Running time: 22-24 minutes
- Production companies: Bloodworth/Thomason Mozark Productions; Columbia Pictures Television

Original release
- Network: CBS
- Release: September 29, 1986 – May 24, 1993

Related
- Women of the House (1995)

Designing Women is an American television sitcom created by Linda Bloodworth-Thomason that aired on CBS between September 29, 1986, and May 24, 1993, producing seven seasons and 163 episodes. It was a joint production of Bloodworth/Thomason Mozark Productions in association with Columbia Pictures Television for CBS.

The series centers on the lives of four women and one man working together at an interior design firm in 1980s Atlanta, Georgia, called Sugarbaker & Associates. It originally starred Dixie Carter as Julia Sugarbaker, president of the design firm; Delta Burke as Suzanne Sugarbaker, the design firm's silent partner and Julia's ex-beauty queen sister; Annie Potts as head designer Mary Jo Shively; and Jean Smart as office manager Charlene Frazier. In the third season, Meshach Taylor was given a starring role for his previously recurring character of delivery man and later partner Anthony Bouvier. Later in its run, the series gained notoriety for its well-publicized behind-the-scenes conflicts and cast changes. Julia Duffy and Jan Hooks replaced Burke and Smart for season six, but Duffy was not brought back for the seventh and final season, and she was replaced by Judith Ivey.

== Premise ==
Julia Sugarbaker (Dixie Carter) is an elegant, sophisticated, outspoken woman who is the co-founder and president of Sugarbaker & Associates, an interior design firm located in her own home in Atlanta. She is partnered with her younger sister, Suzanne (Delta Burke), an attractive, selfish, self-centered former Miss Georgia World, who invested her money but does not have an official position within the business. Naïve but sweet-natured Charlene Frazier (Jean Smart), who worked as a secretary for Julia's late husband, Hayden, also invested half of her savings at Sugarbaker's and works as office manager. Charlene's next-door neighbor and recently divorced best friend, Mary Jo Shively (Annie Potts), is the main interior designer of the firm and also a full partner.

Alongside the women, there is Anthony Bouvier (Meshach Taylor), an ex-convict who is hired as the company's deliveryman and later becomes a full partner. By late 1986, Julia and Suzanne's mother, Perky (Louise Latham), comes for a visit with her outrageous best friend Bernice Clifton (Alice Ghostley). Perky does not stay long and moves to Japan, leaving Bernice in Atlanta, where she begins to spend time with the others.

At the end of the fifth season, actress Delta Burke left the show after a much-publicized feud with the show's producers, so her character, Suzanne, moved to Japan to join her mother, Perky. Actress Jean Smart also left at the beginning of the sixth season after deciding she wanted to spend more time with her young child.

To handle Smart's departure, her character, Charlene, moved to England with her Air Force husband and their daughter. Julia and Suzanne's obnoxious cousin Allison (Julia Duffy) acquires Suzanne's share of the design firm and also rents her home. Charlene's sister Carlene (Jan Hooks) moves in with her. Carlene also begins working at Sugarbaker's, filling the office manager vacancy that older sister Charlene left behind.

Allison (Duffy) left after the sixth season. Texan widow Bonnie Jean Poteet (Judith Ivey), was written in for season seven. These changes failed to hold the attention of viewers who enjoyed the original cast of the first five seasons. Designing Women was cancelled after seven seasons and 163 episodes.

== Cast and characters ==
=== Main ===
Original cast (1986–1991)

- Dixie Carter as Julia Sugarbaker, president and founder of Sugarbaker & Associates interior design firm. Elegant and classy, but outspoken and opinionated, Julia is known for a no-nonsense demeanor; throughout the course of the show, Julia has several monologues and speeches from a feminist and liberal perspective, and is known for telling people off, earning her the nickname of "The Terminator". This tendency to 'annihilate' people (Charlene's wording) comes back to bite Julia at times. Most notably, she rudely attacked a man named "Ray Don" for trying to talk to Mary Jo while the women were out for lunch (repeatedly mocking his double name), only to find, about a year later, that he is an IRS agent sent to audit her. She is very protective of her sister Suzanne, even though she is usually the first one to criticize her egocentric statements. Julia is notable as a very talented singer, usually performing in her church choir, and, later on, she also pretends to be a cabaret singer under the pseudonym "Giselle".
- Annie Potts as Mary Jo Shively, Sugarbaker's main designer. Mary Jo is a sarcastic but kind person and a devoted single mother of two. Sadly, she has a sadistic streak of crassness that surfaces when she gets angry, or worse, drunk. Her habit of shouting "Bitch!" in nearly every other episode (most often behind Suzanne's back) brought the show under fire for use of the word in a sitcom, which was not considered acceptable in the late 1980s.
- Jean Smart as Charlene Frazier-Stillfield (seasons 1–5; guest star: season 6), Julia's late husband's former secretary and now office manager of Sugarbaker's. Originally from a large family in Poplar Bluff, Missouri, Charlene is naïve and sweet-hearted; her ditziness can be annoying for her co-workers. She's one of Elvis's biggest fans and worked with several big names while a secretary in Arkansas, including Fred Smith, Sam Walton and Bill Clinton. Eventually, Charlene marries Colonel William Stillfield and they have a baby, Olivia. By 1991, they move to England, leaving Charlene's younger sister, Carlene, to fill in for her at Sugarbaker's.
- Delta Burke as Suzanne Sugarbaker (seasons 1–5), Julia's younger sister and a silent partner at Sugarbaker's. A former beauty queen and alumna of Ole Miss, Suzanne is self-centered and vain, and generally more laissez-faire and traditional in contrast to her sister's views. Thrice-divorced, Suzanne usually dates wealthy elderly men who are terminally ill. During the series, she deals with weight gain and confronts issues of body image for women. In 1991, Suzanne sells all of her shares and moves to Japan to live with her mother.
- Meshach Taylor as Anthony Bouvier (recurring: seasons 1–2, main: seasons 3–7), an ex-convict and a law student, who works as Sugarbaker's delivery man until 1990 and then becomes a full partner. Anthony is very close to his co-workers but develops a special relationship with Suzanne throughout the series. After he is dumped by his girlfriend, Vanessa Chamberlain (Jackeé Harry), BJ (see below) sets up a trip to Las Vegas where a drunk Anthony marries a Folies Bergère singer, Etienne (Sheryl Lee Ralph). He eventually falls in love with her and tries to make the marriage work.
- Julia Duffy as Allison Sugarbaker (season 6), Julia and Suzanne's conservative cousin who becomes a partner at Sugarbaker & Associates. Allison comes from New York City for a visit after buying Suzanne's shares and decides to move back to the South, taking possession of Suzanne's house as well, which Anthony had been renting. They eventually became housemates, but are always arguing because of her attempts to throw him out. After one year being a partner at the design firm, Allison decides to invest in a Victoria's Secret franchise, leaving Atlanta and Sugarbaker's behind.
- Jan Hooks as Carlene Frazier-Dobber (seasons 6–7), Charlene's naïve younger sister from Poplar Bluff, Missouri, who becomes a receptionist at Sugarbaker's after divorcing her car salesman husband, Dwayne Dobber.
- Judith Ivey as Bonnie Jean "BJ" Poteet (season 7), a lively and sharp-witted Texas millionaire who becomes a Sugarbaker & Associates partner after Allison sells her shares. Her late husband James Poteet, a successful tycoon, had a heart attack during their wedding reception, leaving her the control of his Atlanta-based company, Poteet Industries.

=== Recurring ===
- Scott Bakula as Ted Shively (seasons 1–2), Mary Jo's ex-husband and a gynecologist
- Douglas Barr as William "Bill" Stillfield (seasons 2–5), Charlene's husband, a colonel in the U.S. Air Force
- Olivia Brown as Vanessa Hargraves (season 4), Anthony's girlfriend
- Hal Holbrook as Reese Watson (seasons 1–4), Julia's love interest, a widowed and successful Atlanta attorney (the character was killed off in season 5 so Holbrook could appear on Evening Shade)
- Alice Ghostley as Bernice Clifton, the Sugarbakers' eccentric family friend; Ghostley was billed as a "Special Guest Star" throughout the series
- Richard Gilliland as J.D. Shackelford (seasons 1–5), Mary Jo's boyfriend, a talent scout for the Atlanta Braves
- Michael Goldfinger as Rusty (seasons 4–6), the Sugarbakers' electrician
- Brian Lando as Quinton Shively (seasons 1–6), Mary Jo's son
- George Newbern as Payne McIlroy (seasons 1–6), Julia's son
- Gerald McRaney as Dash Goff (season 2), Suzanne's first husband, a novelist and college professor at the University of Arkansas
- Sheryl Lee Ralph as Etienne Toussaint Bouvier (season 7), a showgirl Anthony marries after meeting her while she was performing at the Tropicana Las Vegas
- Lexi Randall as Randa Oliver (season 5), a young girl left in the care of Julia while her wealthy parents are in Europe
- Priscilla Weems as Claudia Marie Shively (seasons 1–5), Mary Jo's daughter

== Episodes ==
Season	Episodes	Originally released		Rank	Rating	Viewers (millions)
Season	Episodes	First released	Last released	Rank	Rating	Viewers (millions)
1	22	September 29, 1986	May 11, 1987	33	16.1	—N/a
2	22	September 14, 1987	March 28, 1988	34	15.5	—N/a
3	22	November 14, 1988	May 22, 1989	33	15.0	20.6
4	28	September 18, 1989	May 21, 1990	22	15.3	21.7
5	24	September 17, 1990	May 13, 1991	10	16.5	24.4
6	23	September 16, 1991	May 4, 1992	6	17.3	24.6
7	22	September 25, 1992	May 24, 1993	67	9.9	14.0
R	1	July 28, 2003		—N/a	—N/a	TBA

== Filming locations ==
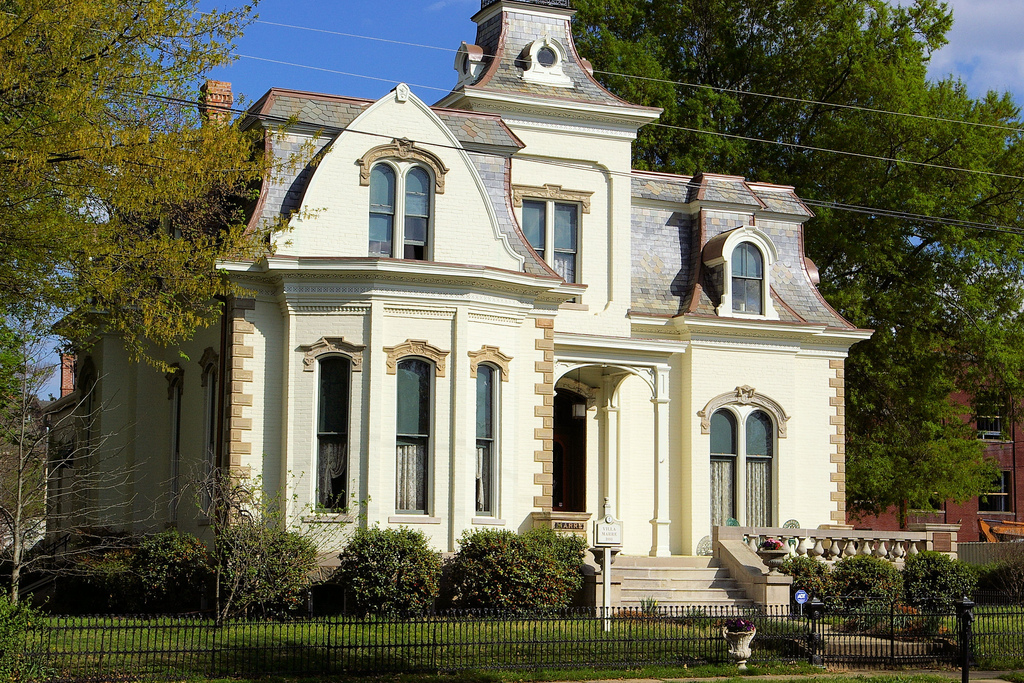
Angelo Marre House, Little Rock, Arkansas

The exterior of the house seen in the series as the location of the Sugarbakers' design firm is the Angelo Marre House located in the historic Quapaw Quarter district in Little Rock, Arkansas.

The home of Suzanne Sugarbaker seen in the series is the Arkansas Governor's Mansion, also in the Quapaw Quarter. Both homes are listed on the National Register of Historic Places.

== Critical reception ==
When the show debuted in CBS's Monday-night lineup in 1986, it garnered respectable ratings; however, CBS moved the show several times to other time slots. After dismal ratings in Sunday night and Thursday night time slots, CBS placed it on hiatus and was ready to cancel the show, but a viewer campaign saved the show and returned it to its Monday night slot. The show's ratings solidified, and it regularly landed in the top 20 rankings. From 1989 through 1992, Designing Women and Murphy Brown (which also centered around a strong, opinionated female character) aired back-to-back, creating a very successful hour-long block for CBS, as both shows were thought to appeal to similar demographics. The show was a top 30 hit for three seasons, from 1989 to 1992, in which the 1989–1992 seasons made it the most successful of the time and helped CBS, which struggled in the ratings around the late 1980s. A move to the Friday night death slot in fall 1992 caused ratings to fall again and the series to be canceled.

== Political views ==
Show creators Linda Bloodworth-Thomason and Harry Thomason were strong supporters of longtime friend and then-Democratic nominee for President of the United States, Bill Clinton and his wife Hillary. Midway through the seventh season, Julia is stranded in the airport while attempting to attend Clinton's first inauguration, in an episode ("The Odyssey") that aired five days prior. Earlier in the series, Charlene mentions working for Clinton during his Arkansas governorship. Another Clinton-related joke was the introduction during the sixth season of the prissy character, Allison Sugarbaker, who makes it quite clear to the others that she attended Wellesley College, Hillary's alma mater. An early third season episode ("The Candidate") also revolves around Julia running for commissioner; she debates on television against a conservative candidate, to whom she eventually loses.

In reality, Dixie Carter was a libertarian-leaning Republican who disagreed with some of the liberal views expressed by her onscreen character. However, she did support liberal causes, such as civil rights and same-sex marriage. Carter cut a deal with the Thomasons in which Julia would sing a song in a future episode for every liberal-leaning monologue.

== Awards and nominations ==
Year	Association	Category	Nominee	Result
1991	BMI Film & TV Awards	BMI TV Music Award	Bruce Miller	Won
1992	BMI Film & TV Awards	BMI TV Music Award	Bruce Miller	Won
1987	Casting Society of America	Artios Award for Best Casting for TV, Comedy Episodic	Fran Bascom	Nominated
1989	Casting Society of America	Artios Award for Best Casting for TV, Comedy Episodic	Fran Bascom	Nominated
1990	Casting Society of America	Artios Award for Best Casting for TV, Comedy Episodic	Fran Bascom	Nominated
1990	Directors Guild of America	Outstanding Directing – Comedy Series	Harry Thomason for episode "They Shoot Fat Women, Don't They?"	Nominated
1991	GLAAD Media Awards	Outstanding Comedy Episode	"Suzanne Goes Looking for a Friend"	Won
1990	Golden Globe Awards	Best Television Series – Musical or Comedy		Nominated
1991	Golden Globe Awards	Best Television Series – Musical or Comedy		Nominated
1987	Primetime Emmy Awards	Outstanding Directing for a Comedy Series	Jack Shea for episode "The Beauty Contest"	Nominated
1987	Primetime Emmy Awards	Outstanding Costume Design for a Series	Cliff Chally for episode "Oh Suzannah"	Nominated
1988	Primetime Emmy Awards	Outstanding Writing for a Comedy Series	Linda Bloodworth-Thomason for episode "Killing All the Right People"	Nominated
1988	Primetime Emmy Awards	Outstanding Editing for a Series – Multi-camera Production	Roger Bondelli for episode "Killing All the Right People"	Nominated
1988	Primetime Emmy Awards	Outstanding Hairstyling for a Series	Judy Crown and Monique DeSart for episode "I'll Be Seeing You"	Won
1989	Primetime Emmy Awards	Outstanding Comedy Series	Harry Thomason, Linda Bloodworth-Thomason, Pamela Norris, Tommy Thompson, Douglas Jackson, and David Trainer	Nominated
1989	Primetime Emmy Awards	Outstanding Supporting Actor in a Comedy Series	Meshach Taylor	Nominated
1989	Primetime Emmy Awards	Outstanding Costume Design for a Series	Cliff Chally for episode "Come On and Marry Me, Bill"	Nominated
1990	Primetime Emmy Awards	Outstanding Comedy Series	Harry Thomason, Linda Bloodworth-Thomason, Pamela Norris, Tommy Thompson, Douglas Jackson, and David Trainer	Nominated
1990	Primetime Emmy Awards	Outstanding Lead Actress in a Comedy Series	Delta Burke	Nominated
1990	Primetime Emmy Awards	Outstanding Directing for a Comedy Series	Harry Thomason for episode "They Shoot Fat Women, Don't They?"	Nominated
1990	Primetime Emmy Awards	Outstanding Editing for a Series – Multi-camera Production	Judy Burke for episode "The First Day of the Last Decade of the Entire Twentieth Century"	Nominated
1990	Primetime Emmy Awards	Outstanding Costume Design for a Series	Cliff Chally for episode "The Rowdy Girls"	Nominated
1990	Primetime Emmy Awards	Outstanding Sound Mixing for a Comedy Series or a Special	Larry Lasota, Anthony Constantini, Doug Gray, and Rick Himot for episode "Tornado Watch"	Nominated
1991	Primetime Emmy Awards	Outstanding Comedy Series	Harry Thomason, Linda Bloodworth-Thomason, Pamela Norris, Tommy Thompson, Douglas Jackson, and David Trainer	Nominated
1991	Primetime Emmy Awards	Outstanding Lead Actress in a Comedy Series	Delta Burke	Nominated
1991	Primetime Emmy Awards	Outstanding Costume Design for a Series	Cliff Chally for episode "Keep the Home Fires Burning"	Nominated
1992	Primetime Emmy Awards	Outstanding Supporting Actress in a Comedy Series	Alice Ghostley	Nominated
1990		Television Critics Association	Outstanding Achievement in Comedy	Nominated
2003	TV Land Awards	Most Memorable Female Guest Star in a Comedy as Herself	Dolly Parton	Won
2003	TV Land Awards	Favorite Guest Performance by a Musician on a TV Show	Ray Charles	Nominated
1987	Viewers for Quality Television	Best Quality Comedy Series		Won
1987	Viewers for Quality Television	Best Writing in a Quality Comedy Series	Linda Bloodworth-Thomason	Won
1987	Viewers for Quality Television	Best Directing in a Quality Comedy Series	Jack Shea	Won
1988	Viewers for Quality Television	Best Quality Comedy Series		Won
1988	Viewers for Quality Television	Best Supporting Actor in a Quality Comedy Series	Meshach Taylor	Won
1988	Viewers for Quality Television	Best Writing in a Quality Comedy Series		Won
1988	Viewers for Quality Television	Best Directing in a Quality Comedy Series		Won
1989	Viewers for Quality Television	Best Quality Comedy Series		Won
1989	Viewers for Quality Television	Best Actress in a Quality Comedy Series	Delta Burke	Nominated
1989	Viewers for Quality Television	Best Actress in a Quality Comedy Series	Dixie Carter	Nominated
1989	Viewers for Quality Television	Best Actress in a Quality Comedy Series	Annie Potts	Nominated
1989	Viewers for Quality Television	Best Supporting Actor in a Quality Comedy Series	Meshach Taylor	Won
1989	Viewers for Quality Television	Best Writing in a Quality Comedy Series		Won
1989	Viewers for Quality Television	Best Directing in a Quality Comedy Series		Won
1990	Viewers for Quality Television	Best Quality Comedy Series		Won
1990	Viewers for Quality Television	Best Actress in a Quality Comedy Series	Delta Burke	Nominated
1990	Viewers for Quality Television	Best Actress in a Quality Comedy Series	Dixie Carter	Nominated
1990	Viewers for Quality Television	Best Supporting Actor in a Quality Comedy Series	Meshach Taylor	Won
1990	Viewers for Quality Television	Best Supporting Actress in a Quality Comedy Series	Alice Ghostley	Nominated
1990	Viewers for Quality Television	Best Writing in a Quality Comedy Series		Won
1990	Viewers for Quality Television	Best Directing in a Quality Comedy Series		Won
1991	Viewers for Quality Television	Best Quality Comedy Series		Nominated
1991	Viewers for Quality Television	Best Actress in a Quality Comedy Series	Delta Burke	Nominated
1991	Viewers for Quality Television	Best Actress in a Quality Comedy Series	Dixie Carter	Nominated
1991	Viewers for Quality Television	Best Supporting Actor in a Quality Comedy Series	Meshach Taylor	Nominated
1991	Viewers for Quality Television	Best Writing in a Quality Comedy Series		Nominated
1991	Viewers for Quality Television	Best Specialty Player	Alice Ghostley	Won
1992	Viewers for Quality Television	Best Actress in a Quality Comedy Series	Dixie Carter	Nominated
1994	Writers Guild of America	Episodic Comedy	Linda Bloodworth-Thomason for episode "The First Day of the Last Decade of the Entire Twentieth Century"	Nominated
1994	Young Artist Awards	Best Youth Actress Recurring or Regular in a TV Series	Lexi Randall	Nominated

== Home media ==
Shout! Factory has released all seven seasons of Designing Women on DVD in Region 1.

DVD name	Ep #	Release date
The Complete First Season	22	May 26, 2009
The Complete Second Season	22	August 11, 2009
The Complete Third Season	22	March 2, 2010
The Complete Fourth Season	29	September 14, 2010
The Complete Fifth Season	24	December 6, 2011
The Complete Sixth Season	23	April 3, 2012
The Complete Seventh and Final Season	22	July 17, 2012

On September 2, 2003, Sony Pictures released The Best of Designing Women, a single-disc DVD featuring five episodes ranging between seasons one through four: "Designing Women (Pilot)" (season 1), "Killing All the Right People" (season 2), "Reservations for Eight" (season 2), "Big Haas and Little Falsie" (season 3) and "They Shoot Fat Women, Don't They?" (season 4).

On September 28, 2010, Shout! Factory released Designing Women, Volume 1, a single-disc DVD featuring seven episodes from the first season: "Designing Women (Pilot)", "A Big Affair", "Design House", "I Do, I Don't", "New Year's Daze", "Monette", "And Justice for Paul".

On June 5, 2012, Shout! Factory released Designing Women – 20 Timeless Episodes, aimed for casual fans to enjoy the series without buying full season sets. The 2-disc DVD set included the following episodes, ranging from seasons one through five: Disc 1 – "Designing Women (pilot)" (season 1), "New Year's Daze" (season 1), "Monette" (season 1), "Oh Suzannah" (season 1), "Ted Remarries" (season 2), "Killing All the Right People" (season 2), "Heart Attacks" (season 2), "Return of Ray Don" (season 2), "Big Haas & Little Falsie" (season 3), "The Wilderness Experience" (season 3). Disc 2 – "The Naked Truth" (season 3), "Stand & Fight" (season 3), "Nightmare from Hee Haw" (season 3), "Julia Gets Her Head Caught in a Fence" (season 4), "Julia & Suzanne's Big Adventure" (season 4), "Foreign Affairs" (season 4), "A Blast from the Past" (season 5), "And Now, Here's Bernice" (season 5), "This is Art?" (season 5) and "The Pride of the Sugarbakers" (season 5).

== Syndication ==
CBS ran reruns of the show in their daytime lineup at 10:00 a.m. (ET) from April 1991 to June 1992. Subsequently, Designing Women aired on the Lifetime cable network for over a decade. Despite its popularity, the show left the network on August 4, 2006.

A 90-minute retrospective special, The Designing Women Reunion, aired on Lifetime on July 28, 2003, reuniting Burke, Potts, Smart, Carter and Taylor in which they shared memories from their time on the series, and also featured interviews with the Thomasons and various writers. Actors Alice Ghostley, Hal Holbrook, Gerald McRaney, and Richard Gilliland also took part in the special.

The series also aired on Nick at Nite beginning October 2, 2006; however, it quickly left and later appeared on its sister network TV Land, airing at various late-night and morning times occasionally until the network lost the rights to air the show in 2008. The series aired on ION Television in 2007 and has also aired on Comedy Gold, TV Guide Network, and Logo.

In recognition of the show's 30th anniversary, getTV began running the series in June 2017 with nightly blocks featuring 30 fan-favorite episodes, after which the series began airing regularly on the network, until it was later removed in 2019.

Antenna TV added the show in January 2020, then later moved to sister station Rewind TV when the channel launched on September 1, 2021. It later moved back to Antenna in September 2022, before it moved back to Rewind on May 26, 2025, currently airing weeknights at 8:00 and 8:30 p.m. EST and Saturdays from 8:00 a.m. to 10:00 a.m. EST. Antenna brought back the show again to their lineup, now airing weeknights at 3:00 and 3:30 a.m. EST while remaining on Rewind. FETV also aired the show before they removed it.

As of August 28, 2019, the series is available for streaming on Hulu. The episodes are their syndication versions, which contain an altered opening credit sequence and choppy edits to allow more time for commercials. As of September 14, 2025, the episodes streaming on Hulu are now their original broadcast versions. The series has also been remastered in 4K.

In 2024, all 7 seasons were available on Amazon Prime Video until it was removed later that same year, also using the syndication prints.

== Spin-off ==
Burke returned as the Suzanne Sugarbaker character in the 1995 spin-off series, Women of the House. The series ran for one season, airing on CBS from January 4, 1995, to August 18, 1995, with the final four episodes airing on Lifetime on September 8, 1995.
