= She Came from Fort Worth =

Single by Kathy Mattea

from the album Willow in the Wind
- B-side: "Here's Hopin'"
- Released: April 7, 1990
- Genre: Country
- Length: 3:34
- Label: Mercury
- Songwriters: Pat Alger, Fred Koller
- Producer: Allen Reynolds

Kathy Mattea singles chronology
"Where've You Been" (1989)	"She Came from Fort Worth" (1990)	"The Battle Hymn of Love" (1990)

"She Came from Fort Worth" is a song written by Pat Alger and Fred Koller, and recorded by American country music artist Kathy Mattea. It was released in April 1990 as the fourth single from the album Willow in the Wind. The song reached #2 on the Billboard Hot Country Singles & Tracks chart.

== Chart performance ==
Chart (1990)	Peak position
Canada Country Singles (RPM)	13
US Hot Country Songs (Billboard)	2

=== Year-end charts ===
Chart (1990)	Position
US Country Songs (Billboard)	42
