= Walk the Way the Wind Blows (song) =

Single by Kathy Mattea

from the album Walk the Way the Wind Blows
- B-side: "Come Home to West Virginia"
- Released: September 13, 1986
- Genre: Country
- Length: 3:46
- Label: Mercury
- Songwriter(s): Tim O'Brien
- Producer(s): Allen Reynolds

Kathy Mattea singles chronology
"Love at the Five and Dime" (1986)	"Walk the Way the Wind Blows" (1986)	"You're the Power" (1987)

"Walk the Way the Wind Blows" is a song written by Tim O'Brien, and recorded by American country music artist Kathy Mattea. It released in September 1986 as the second single and title track from the album Walk the Way the Wind Blows. The song reached #10 on the Billboard Hot Country Singles & Tracks chart.

== Chart performance ==
Chart (1986)	Peak position
US Hot Country Songs (Billboard)	10
