= Walking Away a Winner (song) =

Single by Kathy Mattea

from the album Walking Away a Winner
- B-side: "The Cape"
- Released: March 26, 1994
- Genre: Country
- Length: 3:30
- Label: Mercury Nashville
- Songwriters: Tom Shapiro, Bob DiPiero
- Producer: Josh Leo

Kathy Mattea singles chronology
"Listen to the Radio" (1993)	"Walking Away a Winner" (1994)	"Nobody's Gonna Rain on Our Parade" (1994)

"Walking Away a Winner" is a song written by Tom Shapiro and Bob DiPiero, and recorded by American country music artist Kathy Mattea. It was released in March 1994 as the first single and title track from the album Walking Away a Winner. The song reached #3 on the Billboard Hot Country Singles & Tracks chart.

== Music video ==
Directed by Steven Goldmann, the video starts off in a mobile trailer in the desert. It shows Kathy confronting her lazy boyfriend (who is sitting watching TV, obviously not caring and staring into space). She is outraged, and goes to extremes to confront her emotions and teach him a lesson. She lights the trailer on fire, takes his car and all his belongings to sell off to others, and (after finding him in the trunk of the car) ties him up so he can't break free. Shots of her singing the song in a black jacket and long black hair near the car are also shown. It was filmed in Arizona's Painted Desert.

== Chart performance ==
Chart (1994)	Peak position
Canada Country Singles (RPM)	16
US Hot Country Songs (Billboard)	3

=== Year-end charts ===
Chart (1994)	Position
US Country Songs (Billboard)	21
