= Love Travels (song) =

Single by Kathy Mattea

from the album Love Travels
- Released: August 1997
- Studio: Woodland Studios
- Genre: Contemporary country
- Length: 3:43
- Label: Mercury; PolyGram
- Songwriter(s): Bob Halligan Jr.; Linda Halligan
- Producer(s): Kathy Mattea; Ben Wisch

Kathy Mattea singles chronology
| "I'm on Your Side" (1997) | "Love Travels" (1997) | "Patiently Waiting" (1998) |

"Love Travels" is a song recorded by American country music artist, Kathy Mattea. It was released as in August 1997 as the second single and title track from the Love Travels. It reached a top 40 position on the American country songs chart and was the title track to her 1997 studio album of the same name. The single received a positive review from Billboard in 1997.

== Background and recording ==
During the late eighties and early nineties decades, Kathy Mattea was considered among the country genre's most successful recording artists. She had four number one singles and a series of top 20 singles. In the middle part of the nineties, Mattea went on a temporary recording hiatus before returning in 1997 with the studio effort titled Love Travels. The title track was among the singles spawned from the album. It was composed by Bob Halligan Jr. and Linda Halligan. The song was recorded at Woodland Studios in Nashville, Tennessee with Mattea and Ben Wisch co-producing.

== Release, chart performance and reception ==
"Love Travels" was first the title track to Mattea's 1997 album of the same name, which was first released in February of that year. It was then released as a compact disc single in August 1997. Three versions of the song were included on the CD single, including two nearly identical versions titled "edit". The single debuted on the American Billboard Hot Country Songs chart on August 16, 1997. It spent 16 weeks there and peaked at number 39 on October 18, 1997. It is Mattea's last top 40 Billboard country single to date. It also charted on Canada's RPM Country chart, peaking at number 79. Billboard magazine took notice of the single's released in August 1997, highlighting its Celtic influences. They also called the song "powerful and poetic with a positive message that is buoyed by a soaring melody".

== Track listing ==
CD single

- "Love Travels (Edit)" – 3:43
- "Love Travels (Edit)" – 3:43
- "Love Travels (Album Version)" – 5:32

== Charts ==
Chart performance for "Love Travels"
| Chart (1997) | Peak position |
|---|---|
| Canada Country Singles (RPM) | 79 |
| US Hot Country Songs (Billboard) | 39 |
