= The Battle Hymn of Love =

Single by Kathy Mattea with Tim O'Brien

from the album A Collection of Hits
- B-side: "Leaving West Virginia"
- Released: July 21, 1990
- Genre: Country
- Length: 2:52
- Label: Mercury
- Songwriters: Paul Overstreet; Don Schlitz
- Producer: Allen Reynolds

Kathy Mattea singles chronology
| "She Came from Fort Worth" (1990) | "The Battle Hymn of Love" (1990) | "A Few Good Things Remain" (1990) |

"The Battle Hymn of Love" is a song written by Paul Overstreet and Don Schlitz, and recorded by American country music artists Kathy Mattea and Tim O'Brien. The song was recorded for Mattea's 1987 studio album Untasted Honey. It was released in July 1990 as the first single from her compilation album A Collection of Hits. The song reached #9 on the Billboard Hot Country Singles & Tracks chart.

== Personnel ==
As listed in liner notes.

- Beth Nielsen Chapman – backing vocals
- Craig Duncan – hammered dulcimer
- Pat Flynn – acoustic guitar
- Mike Leech – bass guitar
- Chris Leuzinger – acoustic rhythm guitar, electric rhythm guitar
- Kathy Mattea – vocals
- Tim O'Brien – vocals
- Milton Sledge – drums
- Pete Wasner – acoustic piano
- Bobby Wood – organ

== Chart performance ==
| Chart (1990) | Peak position |
|---|---|
| Canada Country Singles (RPM) | 10 |
| US Hot Country Songs (Billboard) | 9 |
