= 455 Rocket =

Single by Kathy Mattea

from the album Love Travels
- B-side: "All Roads to the River"
- Released: January 18, 1997
- Genre: Country
- Length: 4:09
- Label: Mercury Nashville
- Songwriters: Gillian Welch, David Rawlings
- Producers: Ben Wisch, Kathy Mattea

Kathy Mattea singles chronology
"Clown in Your Rodeo" (1995)	"455 Rocket" (1997)	"I'm on Your Side" (1997)

"455 Rocket" is a song written by Gillian Welch and David Rawlings, and recorded by American country music artist Kathy Mattea. It was released in January 1997 as the first single from the album Love Travels. The song reached number 21 on the Billboard Hot Country Singles & Tracks chart.

== Content ==
The song is about a woman who buys a used Oldsmobile with a powerful 455 V8 engine. Despite its flaws, which include a leaky roof and excessive noise, she enjoys racing and winning against local car enthusiasts. During one race, though, she skids on a curve and crashes through a guardrail; although she is unhurt, the car is badly damaged and has to be towed away.

Mattea noted of the song that the band recorded several takes, but decided to keep the first one because "no one thought they were being recorded, and everyone was just playing with abandon." She also noted that due to the nature of the recording, session musician Jim Keltner can be heard dropping his drumsticks at the end of the song and laughing.

== Critical reception ==
Billboard magazine gave the song a mixed review, saying that it was "cleverly written" but that "neither Mattea's vocal energy nor the production pace infuses the song with the sass and sizzle the lyric suggests."

== Personnel ==
From Love Travels liner notes.

- Pat Buchanan - electric guitar
- Jerry Douglas - Dobro
- Stuart Duncan - mandolin
- Bob Halligan Jr. - background vocals
- Hutch Hutchinson - bass guitar, foot taps, knee slaps
- Kirk "Jelly Roll" Johnson - harmonica
- Jim Keltner - drums, maracas, foot taps, knee slaps
- Kathy Mattea - vocals, foot taps, knee slaps
- Don Potter - acoustic guitar
- Kim Richey - background vocals

== Chart performance ==
Chart (1997)	Peak position
Canada Country Singles (RPM)	16
US Hot Country Songs (Billboard)	21
