= Where've You Been =

Single by Kathy Mattea

from the album Willow in the Wind
- B-side: "I'll Take Care of You"
- Released: November 25, 1989
- Genre: Country
- Length: 3:44
- Label: Mercury
- Songwriters: Jon Vezner, Don Henry
- Producer: Allen Reynolds

Kathy Mattea singles chronology
"Burnin' Old Memories" (1989)	"Where've You Been" (1989)	"She Came from Fort Worth" (1990)

"Where've You Been" is a song recorded by American country music artist Kathy Mattea. It was released in November 1989 as the third single from the album Willow in the Wind. The song reached #10 on the Billboard Hot Country Singles & Tracks chart.

== Content ==
Co-written by her husband, Jon Vezner, and Don Henry, the song is about two lovers, Edwin and Claire. It uses three interpretations of the phrase "where've you been", all spoken by Claire toward Edwin in various situations. In the first verse, she asks him where he has been all her life; in the second, she asks him where he has been after coming home late one night; and in the third, the two are elderly hospital patients: Claire has "lost her memory" of family and friends, and close to death, asks Edwin upon seeing him, "where've you been". Edwin and Claire are based on Vezner's own grandparents, as Vezner claims to have witnessed his grandparents having an encounter similar to the elderly encounter of Edwin and Claire.

The song won the Grammy Award for Best Country Song in 1990. Kathy Mattea was awarded the Grammy award for Best Country Performance, Female for her recording.

== Personnel ==
From Willow in the Wind liner notes.

- Edgar Meyer - upright bass
- John Mock - acoustic guitar
- Dave Pomeroy - bass guitar
- Matt Rollings - piano

== Chart performance ==
Chart (1989–1990)	Peak position
Canada Country Singles (RPM)	13
US Adult Contemporary (Billboard)	25
US Hot Country Songs (Billboard)	10

=== Year-end charts ===
Chart (1990)	Position
US Country Songs (Billboard)	55
