= You're the Power =

Single by Kathy Mattea

from the album Walk the Way the Wind Blows
- B-side: "Song for the Life"
- Released: February 7, 1987
- Genre: Country
- Length: 3:07
- Label: Mercury
- Songwriter(s): Craig Bickhardt, F.C. Collins
- Producer(s): Allen Reynolds

Kathy Mattea singles chronology
"Walk the Way the Wind Blows" (1986)	"You're the Power" (1987)	"Train of Memories" (1987)

"You're the Power" is a song written by Craig Bickhardt and F.C. Collins, and recorded by American country music artist Kathy Mattea. It was released in February 1987 as the third single from the album Walk the Way the Wind Blows. The song reached #5 on the Billboard Hot Country Singles & Tracks chart.

== Chart performance ==
Chart (1987)	Peak position
US Hot Country Songs (Billboard)	5
