= Train of Memories =

Single by Kathy Mattea

from the album Walk the Way the Wind Blows
- B-side: "Evenin'"
- Released: May 23, 1987
- Genre: Country
- Length: 2:50
- Label: Mercury
- Songwriter(s): Andy Byrd, Jimbeau Hinson
- Producer(s): Allen Reynolds

Kathy Mattea singles chronology
"You're the Power" (1987)	"Train of Memories" (1987)	"Goin' Gone" (1987)

"Train of Memories" is a song written by Andy Byrd and Jimbeau Hinson, and recorded by American country music artist Kathy Mattea. It was released in May 1987 as the fourth single from the album Walk the Way the Wind Blows. The song reached #6 on the Billboard Hot Country Singles & Tracks chart.

== Chart performance ==
Chart (1987)	Peak position
US Hot Country Songs (Billboard)	6
Canadian RPM Country Tracks	15
