= Life as We Knew It (song) =

Single by Kathy Mattea

from the album Untasted Honey
- B-side: "As Long as I Have a Heart"
- Released: November 12, 1988
- Genre: Country
- Length: 3:17
- Label: Mercury
- Songwriter(s): Walter Carter, Fred Koller
- Producer(s): Allen Reynolds

Kathy Mattea singles chronology
"Untold Stories" (1988)	"Life as We Knew It" (1988)	"Come from the Heart" (1989)

"Life as We Knew It" is a song written by Walter Carter and Fred Koller, and recorded by American country music artist Kathy Mattea. It was released in November 1988 as the fourth single from the album Untasted Honey. The song reached #4 on the Billboard Hot Country Singles & Tracks chart.

== Chart performance ==
Chart (1988–1989)	Peak position
US Hot Country Songs (Billboard)	4

=== Year-end charts ===
Chart (1989)	Position
US Country Songs (Billboard)	57
