= Burnin' Old Memories =

Single by Kathy Mattea

from the album Willow in the Wind
- B-side: "Hills of Alabama"
- Released: July 1989
- Genre: Country
- Length: 2:18
- Label: Mercury
- Songwriters: Larry Boone; Paul Nelson; Gene Nelson
- Producer: Allen Reynolds

Kathy Mattea singles chronology
"Come from the Heart" (1989)	"Burnin' Old Memories" (1989)	"Where've You Been" (1989)

"Burnin' Old Memories" is a song written by Larry Boone, Paul Nelson and Gene Nelson, and recorded by American country music artist Kathy Mattea. It was released in July 1989 as the second single from the album Willow in the Wind. The song was Mattea's fourth and final number one on the country chart. It was number one for one week and spent fourteen weeks on the country chart.

== Chart performance ==
Chart (1989)	Peak position
Canada Country Singles (RPM)	4
US Hot Country Songs (Billboard)	1

=== Year-end charts ===
Chart (1989)	Position
Canada Country Tracks (RPM)	75
US Country Songs (Billboard)	33
