= Reverend Billy C. Wirtz =

American songwriter (born 1954)

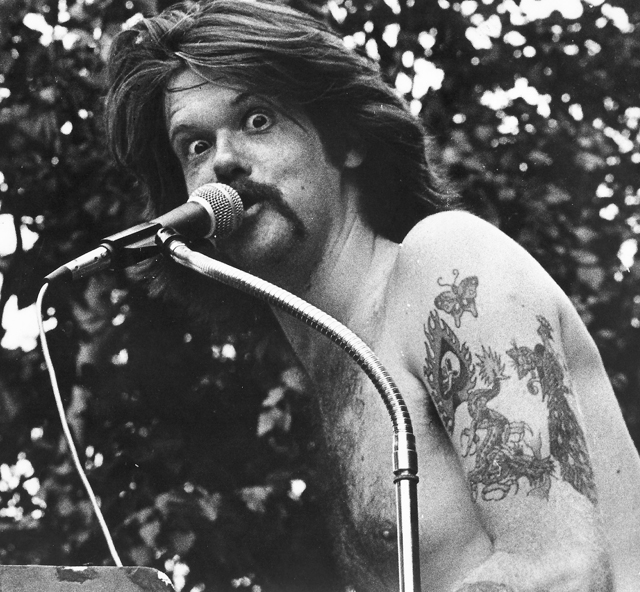
- Rev. Billy Wirtz entertains fellow James Madison University students in 1978. Harrisonburg, Virginia. Photo by Lawrence K. Emerson

Background information
- Born: William McLean Wirths; September 28, 1954 (age 71); Aiken, South Carolina, U.S.
- Genres: Rock; blues; country
- Occupations: Singer-songwriter; comedian
- Years active: 1980s–present
- Label: Blind Pig Records
- Website: revbillycwirtz.com

Reverend Billy C. Wirtz (born William McLean Wirths on September 28, 1954) is an American blues musician, comedian and writer. His material consists of comedy routines set to music.

== Early life and education ==
William Wirths was born in Aiken, South Carolina. His father worked for the United States Atomic Energy Commission, and his mother was a writer and sociologist who worked to reform the police department. The family moved to Washington, D.C., when William was eight years old.

== Career ==
The comedy album boom of the early 1960s was a significant influence, particularly Allan Sherman's My Son, The Folksinger. He started playing guitar at ten, and played in cover bands in his early teens. Working at the Waxie Maxie's Record Store helped broaden his taste, discovering the blues, as well as jazz and gospel. Wirtz developed a friendship with blues pianist Sunnyland Slim who invited him to Chicago in June 1979.

He began his career as a solo artist in 1981. In 1982, he recorded his first album, Salvation Through Polyester, on No Big Deal Records. His song "Teenie Weenie Meanie", described as "a tasteful vignette about a midget lady wrestler" led to a six-month-long contract as a "Manager" with Professional Wrestling From Florida (PWF). While there he worked with Dennis "Mideon" Knight, The Nasty Boys, Gigolo Jimmy Backlund, and Dallas Page. Twelve years later, he returned to professional wrestling with a three-month stint on WTBS Monday Nitro.

The Nashville Network, USA Network and NBC have showcased Wirtz's talents, along with nationwide morning radio shows. Similarly, "Waffle House Fire" has been featured on XM Radio's Channel 151, Laugh USA. Wirtz performs concerts and teaches workshops on blues and gospel music.

In 1990, his album Backslider's Tractor Pull won an award for Comedy Album of the Year by the National Association of Independent Record Distributors. Found on that album is his parody about the Waffle House restaurant chain. On his album Unchained Maladies (1998), he covered Tom Lehrer's "I Hold Your Hand In Mine".

He created a humorous church known as The First House Of Polyester Worship and Horizontal Throbbing Teenage Desire, and Our Lady of the White Go-Go Boot, Lord of the 40-Watt Undulating Bubbling Lava Lamp Apocalyptic, No Pizza Take-Out After Twelve, Shrine Of The Rick Flair ‘WOOOO’, Rasslin' Jeezus.

In 2008, Circumstantial Productions published Wirtz's first book, Sermons & Songs, edited by Richard Connolly. In September 2012, Wirtz published his second book, Red Headed Geek, with Holy Macro Books.

As of 2014, he hosts a radio program on WMNF in Tampa, Florida.

== Personal life ==
Wirtz is married and resides in Ocala, Florida. He tours solo, also with The Nighthawks.

== Discography ==
=== Singles ===
- "Stairway to Freebird/On the Rag Again" – No Big Deal Records (1984)
- "Rib Ticklin" – Memphis in May International Festival Inc (2000)
- "The Best of the Wirtz" (5 track Radio promo) – HighTone Records (2001)

=== Albums ===
- Salvation Through Polyester – No Big Deal Records (1983)
- Deep Fried and Sanctified – King Snake Records (1988), re-released 1989 on HighTone Records
- Backslider's Tractor Pull – HighTone Records (1990)
- A Turn For the Wirtz: Confessions of a Hillbilly Love God – HighTone Records (1992)
- Pianist Envy – HighTone Records (1994)
- Songs of Faith and Inflammation – HighTone Records (1996)
- Unchained Maladies – HighTone Records (1998)
- The Best of the Wirtz – HighTone Records (2001)
- Rev Elation – Rest Stop Records (2004)
- Sermon from Bethlehem – Blind Pig Records (2006)
- Pianist Envy – Group Therapy. (with Victor Wainwright, as Pianist Envy) – (2008, later reissued as Roll Models Piana vs Piano)
- Full Circle – EllerSoul Records (2016)

== See also ==
- Darryl Rhoades
