= Ted Henning =

American producer, actor, screenwriter

Ted Henning is an American video game and animation producer, and former stage, television, and film actor, producer, and screenwriter.

== Acting and writing career ==
=== Early roles – Stage acting and voice work ===
Early acting work includes the Off-Broadway stage play The Moon Dreamers (1969), and several roles (St. Augustine, Mailman, Dragon, Alvin) in the Broadway production Gloria and Esperanza in the ANTA Playhouse (1970). He provided the English voice of Lung Tai in Blood of the Dragon (1971).

=== Television and film ===
His feature film roles include playing Robert Campbell in The Lincoln Conspiracy (1977), Mr. Wetzle in Our Winning Season (1978), Jimmy in The Prize Fighter (1979), Ted in The First Turn-On! (1983), and Fabian Marks in Livin' Large! (1991). On television, he was a regular cast member on Tush (also known as The Bill Tush Show). Other roles included Chip Taylor in the unaired CBS sitcom The Elvira Show and Darrel Gordon in Port Charles.

His guest-starring roles on several series include Guiding Light, CBS Summer Playhouse, Matlock, In Living Color, Northern Exposure, Babylon 5, Melrose Place, Murder, She Wrote, Crisis Center, The Burning Zone, Early Edition, and The Pretender. TV movie roles include Unconquered, A Winner Never Quits, Miss America: Behind the Crown, Lucky Ed's Tabloid News, When Will I Be Loved?, and the television adaptation of the children's book, A Pocket for Corduroy.

As a screenwriter, he wrote the 2008 movie Uncross the Stars starring Daniel Gillies, Barbara Hershey, Ron Perlman, and Irma P. Hall He also co-wrote Winnie the Pooh: A Very Merry Pooh Year (2002) (earning him a DVD Exclusive Awards nomination in 2003), Piglet's Big Movie (2003), and Winnie the Pooh: 123s (2004). He was a director and writer on The Showtime 30-Minute Movie, earning him a CableACE Awards nominee in 1995, and produced the children's storybook CD, Storytime Favorites. He was nominated for a Cable ACE award for Two Over Easy and was associate producer on the Hallmark Hall of Fame TV movie adaptation of the novel Calm at Sunset, Calm at Dawn.

== Education and other work ==
He graduated from Lehigh University with a degree in Mechanical Engineering. He was working on a master's degree in Education Technology at National University.

He was one of the founding partners of online animation studio Scream Therapy, where he created and produced games, music videos, and animated shorts. He was also a creative producer at Gigawatt Studios, where he produced Expedition: Mars, a popular post-ride attraction at the Mission: Space center in Disney World. He has produced games for Mattel, Radio Shack, Microsoft's GameZone, and Sony. He also worked at XLT Studios, a combined game and animation company. He was most recently director of product education at Athenahealth.
