= Come from the Heart =

Single by Kathy Mattea

from the album Willow in the Wind
- B-side: "True North"
- Released: April 1989
- Genre: Country
- Length: 3:11
- Label: Mercury
- Songwriters: Richard Leigh, Susanna Clark
- Producer: Allen Reynolds

Kathy Mattea singles chronology
"Life as We Knew It" (1988)	"Come from the Heart" (1989)	"Burnin' Old Memories" (1989)

"Come from the Heart" is a country music song written by Richard Leigh and Susanna Clark and published in 1987. It is most known through the 1989 single by Kathy Mattea, released in conjunction with her album Willow in the Wind, though the song was first recorded and released on the 1987 Don Williams album Traces and also released in 1988 by Clark's husband on his album Old Friends.

Mattea's single was her third number one on the country chart, spending 14 weeks on that chart including a single week at the top.

Australian folk rock band Weddings, Parties, Anything included their cover of the song on a bonus disc titled Garage Sale included with the release of their 1997 album River’esque.

Hard Working Americans (with front man Todd Snider) recorded the song in 2014 as a duet with Rosanne Cash.

== Misattribution ==
The song includes the lyrics:

You’ve got to sing like you don’t need the money,
Love like you’ll never get hurt.
You’ve got to dance like nobody’s watchin’.

which The Yale Book of Quotations attributes as the source for similar aphorisms sometimes attributed to others (e.g. Annie's Mailbox attributes a version of the lyric to a combination of William Watson Purkey and Satchel Paige). In 2004 in response to an inquiry by a group of librarians Richard Leigh stated

For some reason, people have a great deal of trouble attributing this lyric to its creators: Susanna Clark and Richard Leigh. The reason you can not find any printed or recorded support for these assertions dating back any earlier than our song, is because they don’t exist.... I think the folks out there must be unconsciously disappointed that something that cool came from such ordinary people, so they keep giving it the loftier authorship they believe it deserves.

— Richard Leigh

== Chart performance ==
Chart (1989)	Peak position
Canada Country Singles (RPM)	1
US Hot Country Songs (Billboard)	1

=== Year-end charts ===
Chart (1989)	Position
Canada Country Tracks (RPM)	67
US Country Songs (Billboard)	32
