= Love at the Five and Dime =

1986 song by Nanci Griffith

Song by Nanci Griffith

from the album The Last of the True Believers
- Released: 1986
- Recorded: October 7–9, 1985
- Studio: Cowboy Arms (Nashville, Tennessee)
- Genre: Folk
- Length: 4:33
- Label: Philo
- Songwriter(s): Nanci Griffith
- Producer(s): Jim Rooney and Nanci Griffith

"Love at the Five and Dime"

Single by Kathy Mattea

from the album Walk the Way the Wind Blows
- B-side: "You Can't Run Away from Your Heart"
- Released: April 12, 1986
- Genre: Country
- Length: 3:38
- Label: Mercury
- Songwriter(s): Nanci Griffith
- Producer(s): Allen Reynolds

Kathy Mattea singles chronology
"Heart of the Country" (1985)	"Love at the Five and Dime" (1986)	"Walk the Way the Wind Blows" (1986)

"Love at the Five and Dime" is a song written and originally recorded by Nanci Griffith and later recorded and released by American country music artist Kathy Mattea. It was released in April 1986 as the first single from Mattea's album Walk the Way the Wind Blows. The song was Mattea's breakthrough hit, becoming her first top 10 hit and eventually peaking at No. 3 on the Billboard Hot Country Singles & Tracks chart.

The song was featured on Nanci Griffith's album The Last of the True Believers, also released in 1986. The song inspired the album's cover art, which featured a Woolworths store front. In a live version included on One Fair Summer Evening — recorded August 19 and 20 1988 at Anderson Fair, Houston, Texas — Griffith explains over an extended introduction that the recurring 'ting' sound heard in the music is meant to be a representation of the sound of an elevator in a Woolworth's store. Griffith later re-recorded the song as a duet with Darius Rucker for her 1999 album The Dust Bowl Symphony.

== Content ==
The song recounts a love story between a dime store clerk (Rita) and an aspiring steel guitar player (Eddie) over the years. Early on, Eddie's mother disapproves of the relationship because Eddie plays the bars and keeps Rita out very late. Eddie and Rita marry, and their love survives the loss of a child.

At one point the marriage hits a rocky patch as one of Eddie's fellow band members falls for Rita, and Eddie runs off with the band member's wife. It isn't long, however, before Eddie and Rita are back together, having apparently forgiven each other.

The song then shifts to the present. Eddie is now an insurance salesman and retired from the band, due to arthritis. Rita is now a housewife with a part-time job at the dime store.

== Chart performance ==
Chart (1986)	Peak position
US Hot Country Songs (Billboard)	3
