= Tush (TV series) =

- Also known as: The Bill Tush Show
- Created by: Ted Turner, R.T. Williams, Bill Tush
- Written by: Terry Turner, Bonnie Turner
- Directed by: R. T. Williams, George (Bud) Wendling
- Presented by: Bill Tush
- Starring: Bill Tush, Jan Hooks, Terry Turner, Bonnie Turner
- Country of origin: United States
- Original language: English
- No. of seasons: 1
- No. of episodes: 22

Production
- Executive producer: R.T. Williams
- Production location: Atlanta
- Running time: 60 minutes (including commercials)

Original release
- Network: WTBS
- Release: December 28, 1980 – June 6, 1981

Tush (also known as The Bill Tush Show) is an American late-night television sketch comedy and variety show developed by Bill Tush and directed by R. T. Williams. The show premiered on Atlanta superstation WTBS in the United States on December 28, 1980, and ran until June 6, 1981 when WTBS canceled the series.

== History ==
Tush was a local news anchor and news director in Atlanta, known for humorous morning segments. The Bill Tush Show was meant to bring his humor to a national cable audience. A number of the stars including Jan Hooks, Terry Turner, and Bonnie Turner went on to work for Saturday Night Live. The regular cast was Larry Larson, Ron Kirk, Iris Little-Roberts (now Little-Thomas), Eddie Lee, Allison Biggers, Rob Cleveland, Bob Gillies, Ted Henning, Yetta Levitt.

The Bill Tush Show was cancelled after 22 hour-long episodes, in June 1981. The show was too difficult to develop on a weekly basis, according to Robert Wussler, the station's executive vice president at the time. The station aired reruns of the series for several years thereafter.

== Awards ==
• 1982 CableACE Award – ACE Single Program – General Entertainment or Variety: Comedy
