= Clown in Your Rodeo =

Single by Kathy Mattea

from the album Walking Away a Winner
- B-side: "Who's Gonna Know"
- Released: April 1, 1995
- Genre: Country
- Length: 3:27
- Label: Mercury Nashville
- Songwriter: Wayne Kirkpatrick
- Producer: Josh Leo

Kathy Mattea singles chronology
"Maybe She's Human" (1994)	"Clown in Your Rodeo" (1995)	"455 Rocket" (1997)

"Clown in Your Rodeo" is a song written by Wayne Kirkpatrick, and recorded by American country music artist Kathy Mattea. It was released in April 1995 as the fourth single from the album Walking Away a Winner. The song reached #20 on the Billboard Hot Country Singles & Tracks chart.

== Chart performance ==
Chart (1995)	Peak position
Canada Country Singles (RPM)	37
US Hot Country Songs (Billboard)	20
