= Untold Stories (Kathy Mattea song) =

Single by Kathy Mattea

from the album Untasted Honey
- B-side: "Late in the Day"
- Released: July 9, 1988
- Genre: Country
- Length: 3:00
- Label: Mercury
- Songwriter(s): Tim O'Brien
- Producer(s): Allen Reynolds

Kathy Mattea singles chronology
"Eighteen Wheels and a Dozen Roses" (1988)	"Untold Stories" (1988)	"Life as We Knew It" (1988)

"Untold Stories" is a song written by Tim O'Brien, and recorded by American country music artist Kathy Mattea. It was released in July 1988 as the third single from the album Untasted Honey. The song reached #4 on the Billboard Hot Country Singles & Tracks chart.

== Charts ==
=== Weekly charts ===
Chart (1988)	Peak position
US Hot Country Songs (Billboard)	4
Canadian RPM Country Tracks	13

=== Year-end charts ===
Chart (1988)	Position
US Hot Country Songs (Billboard)	51
