= Goin' Gone =

Single by Kathy Mattea

from the album Untasted Honey
- B-side: "Every Love"
- Released: September 1987
- Genre: Country
- Length: 4:28
- Label: Mercury
- Songwriter(s): Pat Alger; Bill Dale; Fred Koller
- Producer(s): Allen Reynolds

Kathy Mattea singles chronology
"Train of Memories" (1987)	"Goin' Gone" (1987)	"Eighteen Wheels and a Dozen Roses" (1988)

"Goin' Gone" is a song written by Pat Alger, Bill Dale and Fred Koller, and recorded by American country music artist Kathy Mattea. It was released in September 1987 as the first single from the album Untasted Honey. The song was Mattea's ninth country hit and the first of four number one country singles. The single went to number one for one week and spent fifteen weeks on the country chart.

The song was initially recorded in 1985 by Nanci Griffith, and included on her album The Last of the True Believers. Songwriter Pat Alger played guitar on both Griffith's and Mattea's albums, and recorded his own version for his 1991 album, True Love & Other Short Stories. Other artists recording the song include Rhonda Vincent, who included it on her 1990 album, A Dream Come True.

== Charts ==
=== Weekly charts ===
Chart (1987–1988)	Peak position
US Hot Country Songs (Billboard)	1
Canadian RPM Country Tracks	3

=== Year-end charts ===
Chart (1988)	Position
US Hot Country Songs (Billboard)	84
