= Eighteen Wheels and a Dozen Roses =

Single by Kathy Mattea

from the album Untasted Honey
- B-side: "Like a Hurricane"
- Released: June 1, 1987
- Genre: Country
- Length: 3:23
- Label: Mercury
- Songwriters: Gene Nelson, Paul Nelson
- Producer: Allen Reynolds

Kathy Mattea singles chronology
"Goin' Gone" (1987)	"Eighteen Wheels and a Dozen Roses" (1987)	"Untold Stories" (1988)

"Eighteen Wheels and a Dozen Roses" is a song written by Paul Nelson and Gene Nelson, and recorded by American country music artist Kathy Mattea. It was originally released on June 1, 1987, per Mercury Records, as the second single from her album Untasted Honey. The song hit number one on both the US and Canadian Country charts in 1988.

== Content ==
The song is about a truck driver named Charlie who is retiring after thirty years to spend more time with his wife. The song mentions Charlie receiving a gold watch, a common retirement gift. The song's chorus counts down from the 18 wheels, a dozen roses, ten more miles, a four-day run, and a few more songs until Charlie eventually reaches "the one that he loves."

== Critical reception ==
In 2024, Rolling Stone placed "Eighteen Wheels and a Dozen Roses" at #176 on its 200 Greatest Country Songs of All Time ranking.

== Music video ==
The video was directed by May/Sams. The video opens with Mattea dining at the Pie Wagon, a diner off Music Row in Nashville, Tennessee, when a truck driver approaches her and asks for her autograph as a present for his wife. Here, we learn that her first name is Nina. Throughout the video, there are scenes of Mattea on her tour bus, performing with her band, and scenes of the truck driver. In the end, the driver makes it home, his wife greeting him, and he hands her the dozen roses mentioned in the song's lyric, as they walk arm in arm into their house; Kathy turns off the lights to the bus, and the video ends with a shot of various trucks driving on the highway.

== Charts ==
=== Weekly charts ===
Chart (1988)	Peak position
US Hot Country Songs (Billboard)	1
Canadian RPM Country Tracks	1

=== Year-end charts ===
Chart (1988)	Position
US Hot Country Songs (Billboard)	19
