= Fred Koller =

American singer-songwriter (born 1950)

Fred Koller (born March 5, 1950, in Chicago) is an American singer-songwriter. He has been active in the music business since 1973. Fred lives and works in Nashville with his wife Trish and their cat Buddy.

== Music career ==
Koller has written over 300 songs which have been recorded. He was awarded the BMI Millionaire Performance Award for both "Angel Eyes" and "She Came from Fort Worth". Koller also won BMI Awards for "This Dream's on Me", "Goin' Gone", "Life As We Knew It" and "Will It Be Love By Morning". He is the former Vice President of The Nashville Songwriters Association International. Koller has taught for Songwriters Guild of America and was a staff instructor for both the Kerrville Folk Festival and the Augusta Heritage Festival.

== Books and bookselling ==
Koller opened his first bookstore in Capitola, California, in 1975. It was located a few blocks from the ocean on Bay Ave. and was called Words and Music. The shop stocked an eclectic collection of used records, books and sheet music. After two years the store moved to an old fisherman's cottage where Fred and his first wife, majolica artist Farraday Newsome, lived upstairs.

In 1979 Fred sold his bookstore and moved back to Nashville, Tennessee. He opened Rhino Booksellers in Nashville in Oct. 2001. There are presently two locations.

Koller is the author of How to Pitch and Promote Your Songs which is in its third edition. He also contributed to The Homespun Songwriter's Workshop and taught Homespun Tapes: Developing Your Lyrics.

== Fred and Shel ==
Children's author Shel Silverstein was spending a lot of time on his houseboat in Sausalito, California, and would often visit to write songs and explore Santa Cruz, California.

In 1974, Silverstein and Koller began writing their first song together. Silverstein was already famous for his Playboy cartoons, children's books and several songwriting hits for artists like Doctor Hook and Johnny Cash. Their collaboration grew into a friendship that would last for the next 25 years.

On one two-week trip together to Santa Cruz, California they wrote a dozen songs like "Don’t Knock The Music (You Were Made To)" and "Lovely Margarita," which features a transvestite strip tease artist unveiling the "secrets of an ancient world's delight." Other encounters produced "Little Green Buttons," which introduces listeners to a woman saving a dying marriage with carefully placed tattoos, and "The Happy Caucasian," which chronicles a modern-day Johnny Appleseed who spreads joy and jubilation all across the nation while "singing out good news." Country singer Bobby Bare recorded a version of "This Guitar Is for Sale," and Robert Earl Keen, Conway Twitty and Bare have all recorded versions of the first song Koller and Silverstein wrote together, "Jennifer Johnson and Me". A few more were recorded on Fred's "Night of The Living Fred" release.

== Discography ==
- Night of the Living Fred, Alcazar (1989)
- Songs From the Night Before, Alcazar (1994)
- Where the Fast Lane Ends, Alcazar (1994)
- Sweet Baby Fred, Appaloosa (1998)
- No Song Left To Sell, Gadfly (2001)
- 12 Original Songs Live From Norm's River Road House, Lucrative Music (2012)

== Songwriting credits ==
Song title	Artist
Ain’t It Been Love	Vern Gosdin
Alabama Bad	Marshall Chapman
Angel Eyes	Jeff Healey Band, New Grass Revival, John Hiatt
Bachelor Girl	Baillie & the Boys
Blind Luck	Peter Case
Boomtown	Lacy J. Dalton
Breaking Up This Happy Home	Brendan Croker
Caught in the Spotlight	Bobby Bare & Lacy J. Dalton
Circumstantial Evidence	Jerry Lee Lewis
Count the Days	Don Dixon
Daddy Was a Sensitive Man	Reverend Billy C. Wirtz, Ironweed
Don't Knock The Music	Sean Seman
Don't The Good Times	Rosemary Clooney
Drink American	Peter Stampfel
Driving You Out Of My Mind	Joyce Woodson
Eli Whitney	Kay Adams
Elvis Was A Narc	Pinkard & Bowden
Everytime The Whistle Whines	Tony Sarno
Everything You'd Never Want to Be	Joe Brock
Exactly What I Thought She'd Do	Omar & the Howlers
Fan The Flame	Benita Hill
Feels Real	Afrikan Dreamland
Fool Like That	Gina Jeffreys
Fourth Wife Blues	Reverend Billy C. Wirtz
Gauloise Blue	Jonathan Pointer
Give Me Some Of That	Fred James, C. J. Chenier Jr.
Giving Up The Ghost	Don Dixon, Darlene Love
Goin' Gone	Pat Alger, Mary Black, Forester Sisters, Nanci Griffith, Kathy Mattea, Alison Krauss (live versions exist), Woodstock Mountain Revue
Goodnight Little Houseplant	Bobby Bare, Shel Silverstein
Habits of The Heart	The Woodys
Heart To Heart	Gail Davies
Heart Of A Woman	Terri Gibbs
House of Cards	The New Seekers
I Don't Have The Right	J. T. Hall
I'd Rather Wear Out Than Rust	The Hard Travelers
If Love Hurts	Mary Ann Brandon, Saffire – The Uppity Blues Women
I Get The Picture	Keith Whitley
I Got Your Number	Dave Edmunds, Al Anderson, Albert Lee, Blues and Trouble, Eddy Raven
If You Came Back Tonight	Lorrie Morgan
I'll Be There For You	Brendan Croker, Celeste Krenz
I'm Going To Town	Robert Earl Keen
I'm Still Feeling Blue	J. D. Myers
In My Dreams	Asleep at the Wheel
I Never Got To Say Goodbye	Bill Staines
It Doesn't Matter What The People Say	Peter Case
It Makes No Difference Now	Joyce Woodson
I Wanna Live	Annie Hughes
I Want My Rib Back	Charlie Sizemore, Keith Whitley, Gene Watson, Kenny Chesney, Adam Harvey
I Want To Know	Robert Earl Keen
I Was Going Home	Hundred/Seventy Split
I’ve Loved Enough To Know	Jim Rushing
Jennifer Johnson and Me	Bobby Bare, Mac Davis, Dr. Hook, Goose Creek Symphony, Paul Overstreet, Conway Twitty, Robert Earl Keen
Juanita	David Allan Coe, Burl Ives
King Gets A Day Job	Reverend Billy C. Wirtz
Lady Jane	Max D. Barnes
Last Time I Looked	Peter Case
Let's Talk Dirty In Hawaiian	Jonathan Edwards, John Prine, Wild Jimbos, Tom Rush, Those Darlins'
Life As We Knew It	Kathy Mattea
Little Green Buttons	Lui Collins
Lone Star State of Mind	Pat Alger, Nanci Griffith, Don Williams, Lorrie Morgan
Love Can Be a Dangerous Thing	Pat Alger
Love Will Always Find Its Way	Pierce Pettis
Lovers On the Rebound	Marie Bottrell, The Younger Brothers
Make It Pretty For Me	Lilian Askeland, Bobby Bare, Tom Bresh, Suzanne Klee, Helen O'Conner, Tex Williams
Man's Best Friend is His Automobile	Barry and Holly Tashian
Margarita Hell	Reverend Billy C. Wirtz
Mary Goes Round	Stu Stevens
Melancholy Moon	Tim O'Brien
Midnight Chauffeur	Marshall Chapman
Missionary Ridge	Claire Lynch
Monroe's Mule	John Cowan
My Baby's Like a Jukebox	Jason Sever, Bub Tyler
Niagara Falls	Bill Lloyd
Neutral Ground	Pierce Pettis
Never Be The Same	Pam Tillis
New Day	Laurie Lewis
New Old Friend	The New Seekers, The Hard Travelers
Not To Old To Cry	Kenny Serrat
Off To A Crawling Start	Keith Whitley
Old Blues Singer	Lowell Fulson
On Grafton Street	Frances Black, Nanci Griffith
Open Your Eyes	Brian Austin
Pale Wind	Larry Crane
Piece of Paper	Larry Crane
Pretty Painted Ladies	Bobby Bare, Chris LeDoux, Plainsmen, Sons of the Pioneers
Pull Together	David Mallett
Red Neck State of Art	Brendan Croker
Rock In My Shoe	Tim O'Brien
Rock Stars Lament	Bobby Bare
Room 309	Reverend Billy C. Wirtz
Sassafrass	Coon Creek Girls
She Came from Fort Worth	Kathy Mattea, Pat Alger
She Loves Me She Loves Me Not	Hal Ketchum
She's Just a Place To Fall	Vern Gosdin
Shop Shop	The Bama Band, Erin's Pride, James White
Sidestepping The Blues	Stonewall Jackson
Skip A Stone	Beccy Cole
Somebody Else's Tune	Marge Calhoun
Some of That	Fred James, C. J. Chenier
Something To Hold On To	Joyce Woodson
Stand Still	Brothers Brooks
Stars on The Water	Priscilla Herdman
Stolen Art	Jeff Wilkinson
Strong Young Breeze	Sean Seman
Summer Melody	Stoney Edwards, The Kendalls
Taking My Chances With You	The New Seekers
Tell Me I'm Mistaken	J. T. Hall
The TV Tells Me So	Smothers Brothers
Tell Me What You Want	Brendan Croker
The Town With No Downtown	Jeff Wilkinson
The First Time	Danny O'Keefe
There's No Guarantee	Al Anderson
This Dream's on Me	Gene Watson
This Guitar is For Sale	Bobby Bare, Wes McGee, John Prine
This Time I'm Gonna Be Loved	J. T. Hall
This Town	Pat Alger
Til The Coast Is Clear	Hal Ketchum
True Western Movie	Chris LeDoux
Twenty-Nine	Todd Dereemer
Walking With My Memories	Loretta Lynn
We’re History	Atlanta
Wheel of Fortune	Peter Rowan
When It's Gone	Tom Paxton
When The Sun Comes Up	Tammi Fassert
When You Ran With Me	Hank Flamingo
Where The Fast Lane Ends	Sonny Throckmorton, The Oak Ridge Boys
Where the Blue Began	Hundred/Seventy Split
Whicita Way	John Cowan
Whiplash Will	Bobby Bare
Will It Be Love By Morning	Michael Martin Murphey
Winding Down	Lacy J. Dalton
With Out The Love	The New Seekers
Words Said In The Dark	Pierce Pettis
Yard Sale	Jonathan Pointer
Yes Mr. Rogers	Bob Gibson (musician), Shel Silverstein
You Can't Take The Texas	Lacy J. Dalton
You Don't Mean A Thing	Al Anderson
