= Tom Paxton discography =

American folk singer-songwriter

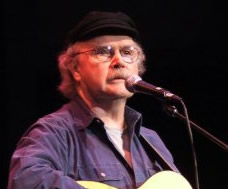
- Paxton at a concert in 2007
- Studio albums: 49
- Live albums: 13
- Compilation albums: 95

Tom Paxton (born October 31, 1937) is an American folk singer-songwriter who has had a music career spanning more than sixty years. In 2009, Paxton received a Grammy Lifetime Achievement Award. He is noteworthy as a music educator as well as an advocate for folk singers to combine traditional songs with new compositions.

Paxton's songs have been featured in the following movies: A Time for Burning (1966), Jennifer on My Mind (1971), Demolition Man (1993), The Family Man (2000), North Country (2005), and Spike (2008).

Paxton's song "Going to the Zoo" was included in an episode of Monty Python's Flying Circus titled "It's the Arts (or: Intermission)" (Season 1, episode 13; aired January 11, 1970; recorded January 4, 1970). "Going to the Zoo" was also featured on an episode of Sharon, Lois & Bram's Elephant Show titled "Zoo" (Season 1, Episode 9; aired, November 5, 1984). His song "Lyndon Johnson Told the Nation" was included in an episode of American Experience titled LBJ (1991). "The Last Thing on My Mind" was included on Bravo Profiles Dolly Parton: Diamond in a Rhinestone World (aired September 6, 1999). A brief clip of Paxton was shown during the 51st Grammy Awards telecast on February 8, 2009, which announced his Grammy Lifetime Achievement Award. He contributed original music for the short drama The Price of Art (2007; released June 5, 2009).

== Discography ==
1. I'm the Man That Built the Bridges [live] (Gaslight, 1962)
2. Ramblin' Boy (Elektra, 1964)
3. Ain't That News! (Elektra, 1965)
4. Outward Bound (Elektra, 1966)
5. Morning Again (Elektra, 1968)
6. The Things I Notice Now (Elektra, 1969)
7. Tom Paxton 6 (Elektra, 1970)
8. The Compleat Tom Paxton [live in June 1970 at the Bitter End nightclub, Greenwich Village, Lower Manhattan, New York City] (Elektra, 1971)
9. How Come the Sun (Reprise, 1971)
10. Peace Will Come (Reprise, 1972)
11. New Songs for Old Friends [live] (Reprise, 1973)
12. Children's Song Book (Bradleys, 1974) (reissued in the U.S. ten years later under the title The Marvelous Toy and Other Gallimaufry (Cherry Lane / Flying Fish, 1984))
13. Something in My Life (Private Stock, 1975)
14. Saturday Night (MAM, 1976)
15. New Songs from the Briarpatch [live] (Vanguard, 1977)
16. Heroes (Vanguard, 1978)
17. Up and Up (Mountain Railroad, 1979)
18. The Paxton Report (Mountain Railroad, 1980)
19. Bulletin (Hogeye, 1983)
20. Even a Gray Day (Flying Fish, 1983)
21. Tom Paxton in the Orchard (Cherry Lane Records, 1984)
22. One Million Lawyers and Other Disasters (Flying Fish, 1985)
23. A Paxton Primer (Pax, 1986)
24. Folksong Festival 1986 (Pax, 1986)
25. And Loving You (Flying Fish, 1986)
26. Balloon-alloon-alloon (Sony Kids' Music, 1987)
27. Politics Live [live] (Flying Fish, 1988)
28. The Very Best of Tom Paxton (Flying Fish, 1988)
29. In The Orchard [live] (Sundown Records, 1988)
30. Storyteller (Start Records Ltd, 1989)
31. Peanut Butter Pie (Pax, 1990) (Sony Kids’ Music, 1992)
32. It Ain't Easy (Flying Fish, 1991)
33. A Child's Christmas (Sony Kids' Music, 1992)
34. Suzy Is a Rocker (Sony Kids' Music, 1992)
35. Wearing the Time (Sugar Hill, 1994)
36. Live: For the Record [live] (Sugar Hill, 1996)
37. A Child's Christmas/Marvelous Toy and Other Gallimaufry (Delta, 1996)
38. A Car Full of Songs (Sony Kids' Music, 1997)
39. Goin' to the Zoo (Rounder, 1997)
40. I've Got a Yo-Yo (Rounder, 1997)
41. The Best of Tom Paxton (Hallmark, 1997)
42. Live in Concert [live] (Strange Fruit, 1998)
43. Fun Animal Songs (Delta, 1999)
44. Fun Food Songs (Delta, 1999)
45. A Car Full of Fun Songs (Delta, 1999)
46. I Can't Help But Wonder Where I'm Bound: The Best of Tom Paxton (Rhino, 1999)
47. Best of the Vanguard Years (Vanguard, 2000)
48. Stars in Their Eyes (Cub Creek Records, 2000), duet with Mark Elliott
49. Live From Mountain Stage [live] (Blue Plate, 2001)
50. Under American Skies (Appleseed and Koch International, 2001)
51. Ramblin' Boy/Ain't That News! (Warner Strategic Marketing, 2002)
52. Your Shoes, My Shoes (Red House, 2002)
53. Looking for the Moon (Appleseed, 2002)
54. American Troubadour (Music Club, 2003)
55. Best of Friends [live on February 16, 1985, at Holsteins folk club, Chicago, Illinois] (Appleseed Recordings, 2004) (originally taped for broadcast by WFMT's The Midnight Special radio show by its host, Rich Warren)
56. The Compleat Tom Paxton (Even Compleater) [live] (Rhino Handmade, 2004)
57. Outward Bound/Morning Again (Wea/Rhino, 2004)
58. Live in the UK [live] (Pax, 2005)
59. Live at McCabe's Guitar Shop [live] (Shout Factory, 2006)
60. Comedians and Angels (Appleseed, 2008)
61. Redemption Road (Pax Records, 2015)
62. Boat in the Water (Pax Records, 2017)
63. Live at Portland, Oregon, November 7, 2017 (2018) with The Don Juans
64. The Essential (Apple Music, 2019)
65. Live! (Bandcamp, 2019) with The Don Juans
66. Rabbit (Misra, 2022) with Buffalo Rose
67. Together (Appalseed Productions, 2023) with John McCutcheon
68. Together Again (Appalseed Productions, 2026) with John McCutcheon

== Compilations and other recordings ==
- 1963 Newport Broadside [Compilation] [Live] (Vanguard, 1964)
- Broadside Ballads, Vol. 3: The Broadside Singers (Folkways, 1964)
- The Folk Box: Various Artists (Elektra, 1964)
- Folksong '65 Elektra 15th Anniversary Commemorative Album (Elektra, 1965)
- Tom Paxton: Tom Paxton (7-inch EP released in the UK)(EPK 802) (Elektra, 1967)
- Alive! Chad Mitchell Trio album (Reprise, 1967)
- Fantastic Folk: Various Artists (Elektra, 1968)
- Select Elektra: Various Artists (Elektra, 1968)
- Elektra's Best: Volume 1, 1966 through 1968: Various Artists (Elektra, 1968)
- Something to Sing About Various Artists (No label, circa 1968)
- Begin Here: Various Artists (Elektra, 1969)
- First Family of New Rock Various Artists (Warner Bros., 1969)
- 4/71: Various Artists: Elektra EK-PROMO 3 (Elektra, 1971)
- A Tribute to Woody Guthrie Part One [Live 1968] (CBS, 1972)
- A Tribute to Woody Guthrie Part Two [Live 1968] (Warner Bros., 1972)
- Broadside Ballads, Vol. 6: Broadside Reunion (Folkways, 1972)
- Greatest Folksingers of the '60s (Vanguard, 1972)
- Garden of Delights: Various Artists (Elektra, 1972)
- The Camera and the Song: Oklahoma Folk (BBC documentary soundtrack) (1976)
- Kerrville Folk Festival 1977 [Live] (P.S.G. Recording, 1977)
- Philadelphia Folk Festival [Live 1977] (Flying Fish, 1978)
- Bread & Roses Festival 1977 [Live] (Fantasy, 1979)
- The Perfect High Bob Gibson album (Drive Archive, 1980)
- CooP – Fast Folk Musical Magazine (Vol. 2, No. 1) First Anniversary (Folkways, 1983)
- Bleecker and MacDougal: The Folk Scene of the 1960s (Elektra, 1984)
- Fast Folk Musical Magazine (Vol. 2, No. 10) (Folkways, 1985)
- Storytellers: Singers & Songwriters (Warner Bros., 1987)
- A Tribute to Woody Guthrie (Warner Bros., 1989)
- Folked Again (Mountain Railroad, 1989)
- Ben & Jerry's Newport Folk Festival 88 (Alcazar, 1989)
- All-Ears Review, Volume 7: Still Amazing After All These Years (ROM, 1989)
- The Greenwich Village Folk Festival 1989–90 (Gadfly, 1990)
- Ben & Jerry's Newport Folk Festival, Vol. 2 (Alcazar, 1990)
- Newport Folk Festival (Vanguard, 1991)
- Smithsonian Collection of Folk Song America, Vol. 3 (Smithsonian, 1991)
- Troubadours of the Folk Era, Vol. 2 (Rhino, 1992)
- American Folk Legends (Laserlight, 1993)
- Put on Your Green Shoes (CBS, 1993)
- Animal Tales Bill Shontz album (Lightyear, 1993)
- Freedom Is a Constant Struggle (Songs of the Mississippi Civil Rights Movement) (Folk Era, 1994)
- Folk Song America, Vol. 3 (Smithsonian Folkways, 1994)
- Folk [Friedman] (Friedman/Fairfax, 1994)
- To All My Friends in Far-Flung Places Dave Van Ronk album (Gazell, 1994)
- Never Grow Old Anne Hills and Cindy Mangsen album (Flying Fish, 1994)
- Christine Lavin Presents: Follow That Road: 2nd Annual Vineyard Retreat (Philo, 1994)
- A Child's Holiday (Alacazam!/Alcazar, 1994)
- The SilverWolf Homeless Project (Silverwolf/IODA, 1995)
- LifeLines Peter, Paul and Mary album (Warner Bros., 1995)
- Makin' a Mess: Bob Gibson Sings Shel Silverstein Bob Gibson album (Asylum, 1995)
- One More Song: An Album for Club Passim (Philo, 1996)
- Christine Lavin Presents: Laugh Tracks Vol.2 (Shanachie, 1996)
- Treestar Revue (Beacon, 1996)
- A Child's Celebration of Song, Vol. 2 (Rhino, 1996)
- A Very Cherry Christmas [Box Set] (Delta, 1996)
- Kid Songs Roth & Paxton & Young (Sony Special Products, 1996)
- Dog Songs (Disney, 1996)
- Vanguard Folk Sampler (Vanguard, 1996)
- Vanguard Collector's Edition [Box Set] (Vanguard, 1997)
- Christmas Treasures, Vol. 3 (Delta, 1997)
- Christmas Treasures [Box Set] (Laserlight, 1997)
- Christmas for Kids (Laserlight, 1997)
- Legendary Folk Singers (Vanguard, 1997)
- What's That I Hear? The Songs of Phil Ochs (Sliced Bread, 1998)
- Where Have All the Flowers Gone: The Songs of Pete Seeger (Appleseed, 1998)
- Kerrville Folk Festival – 25th Anniversary Album (Silverwolf/IODA, 1998)
- Kerrville Folk Festival: Early Years 1972–1981 [Live] [Box Set] (Silverwolf, 1998)
- Generations of Folk, Vol. 2: Protest & Politics (Vanguard, 1998)
- Diamond Cuts (Hungry for Music, 1998)
- American Pie [Various Artists] (ZYX, 1998)
- Around the Campfire Peter, Paul and Mary album (Warner Bros., 1998)
- A Child's Christmas List (Delta, 1999)
- Sweet Dreams of Home Mae Robertson album (Lyric Partners, 1999)
- Best of Broadside 1962–1988 [Box Set] (Folkways, 2000)
- Follow the Music: Various (Elektra, 2000)
- Kerrville Folk Festival (Silverwolf, 2000)
- Soup Happens Hot Soup album (Souper, 2000)
- Philadelphia Folk Festival – 40th Anniversary [Live] [Box Set] (Sliced Bread, 2001)
- Vietnam: Songs from a Divided House (Q. Records, 2001)
- Kids, Cars and Campfires (Red House, 2001)
- Washington Square Memoirs: The Great Urban Folk Boom, 1950–1970 [Box Set] (Rhino, 2001)
- Radio Shows: Greatest Mysteries (Radio Spirits, 2001)
- Vanguard: Roots of Folk (Vanguard, 2002)
- Kerrville Folk Festival: The Silverwolf Years [Box Set] (Silverwolf, 2002)
- Celebration: Philadelphia Folk Festival 40th Festival (Sliced Bread, 2002)
- This Land Is Your Land: Songs of Unity (Music for Little People, 2002)
- Seeds: The Songs of Pete Seeger, Vol. 3 (Appleseed, 2003)
- A Beachwood Christmas (Beachwood, 2003)
- Bon Appétit! Musical Food Fun Cathy Fink & Marcy Marxer album (Rounder, 2003)
- cELLAbration: A Tribute to Ella Jenkins (Folkways, 2004)
- Hail to the Thief II: Songs to Send Bush Packing (2004)
- Missing Persians File: Guide Cats Blind, Vol. 2 (Osmosys, 2005)
- Pop Masters: Early Mornin' Rain (Carinco AG/Digital Music Works, 2005)
- Christine Lavin Presents: One Meat Ball (Appleseed, 2006)
- Forever Changing: The Golden Age Of Elektra Records 1963–1973 (Rhino/Wea, 2006)
- Sowing the Seeds: The 10th Anniversary (Appleseed Recordings, 2007)
  - Carolyn Hester released an album entitled Tom Paxton Tribute (Road Goes on Forever, 1999)

== Music books ==
- Ramblin' Boy and Other Songs by Tom Paxton (music book) (Oak Publications, 1965)
- Tom Paxton Anthology (music book) (United Artists Music Co., 1971)
- Tom Paxton Folio of Songs (music book) (United Artists Music Co., 1972)
- Tom Paxton Easy Guitar (music book) (United Artists Music Co., 1975)
- Politics (music book) (Cherry Lane Music, 1989)
- I Can Read Now (sheet music) (Pax Records / Cherry Lane Music, 1989)
- The Authentic Guitar Style of Tom Paxton (music book) (Cherry Lane Music, 1989)
- Tom Paxton's Children's Songbook (music book) (Cherry Lane Music, 1990)
- A Car Full of Songs (music Book) (Cherry Lane Music, 1991)
- Wearing the Time (music book) (Cherry Lane Music, 1994)
- Ramblin' Boy and Other Songs (Music Sales Corporation, 1997)
- The Honor of Your Company (music book) (Cherry Lane Music, 2000)

== Non-music books ==
- Aesop's Fables (William Morrow & Co, 1988)
- Belling the Cat and Other Aesop's Fables (William Morrow & Co, 1990)
- Engelbert the Elephant (William Morrow & Co, 1990)
- Androcles and the Lion: And Other Aesop's Fables (William Morrow & Co, 1991)
- Birds of a Feather and Other Aesop's Fables (William Morrow & Co, 1993)
- The Animals' Lullaby (Let Me Read, Level 3) (William Morrow & Co, 1993)
- Where's the Baby? (HarperCollins, 1993)
- Engelbert Moves the House (Let Me Read, Level 3) (Good Year Books, 1995)
- The Story of Santa Claus (HarperCollins, 1995)
- The Story of the Tooth Fairy (William Morrow & Company, 1996)
- Going to the Zoo (William Morrow & Company, 1996)
- Meet Tom Paxton – An Interview With Tom Paxton: Level 3 Reader (Good Year Books, 1996)
- Engelbert Joins the Circus (HarperCollins, 1997)
- The Jungle Baseball Game (Morrow Junior, 1999)
- Jennifer's Rabbit (HarperCollins, 2001)

== Videos ==
- Tom Paxton In Concert (video) (Shanachie Records, 1992)
- Other appearances:
  - Pete Seeger's Rainbow Quest (TV show) (1965)
  - BBC's Tonight in Person (TV show) (1966)
  - Once More with Felix – aka "The Julie Felix Show" (December 30, 1967)
  - BBC's in Concert (TV show) (1970)
  - The Mike Douglas Show (June 3, 1970)
  - The Val Doonican Show (July 3, 1971)
  - Tom Jones Variety Special #5 (July 15, 1971)
  - Beat-Club episode #1.64 (1971)
  - Soundstage: Just Folks with Odetta, Josh White Jr. and Bob Gibson (1980)
  - Chords of Fame (1984)
  - Folk City: 25th Anniversary Concert with Odetta, Joan Baez, Eric Andersen, Arlo Guthrie (1987)
  - The Folk Music Reunion (1988)
  - The Story of the Clancy Brothers & Tommy Makem (1991)
  - Peter, Paul and Mary: Lifelines (1996)
  - This Land Is Our Land: The Folk Rock Years II (2003)
  - Get Up, Stand Up: The Story of Pop and Protest (2003)
  - Peter, Paul and Mary: Carry It On – A Musical Legacy (2004)
  - The Ballad of Greenwich Village (2005)
  - Pete Seeger: The Power of Song (2007)
  - Let's Get Together: Highlights of the 20th Annual World Folk Music Association Benefit Weekend Concert (2008)

== Covers ==
Paxton's songs have been recorded by (among others):

- Fred Åkerström
- Bill Anderson
- Eric Andersen
- Artisan
- Chet Atkins
- Au Go-Go Singers (featuring Stephen Stills and Richie Furay)
- Hoyt Axton
- Joan Baez
- Harry Belafonte
- Pat Boone
- Dennis Brown
- Buffalo Rose
- Chris de Burgh
- Alex Campbell
- Glen Campbell
- The Carter Family
- Johnny Cash (with Diana Trask)
- Princess Christina of the Netherlands
- Gene Clark
- Clear Light
- Judy Collins
- J. D. Crowe
- Cry, Cry, Cry
- Rick Danko
- Bobby Darin
- Joe Dassin
- Sandy Denny
- John Denver
- Neil Diamond
- The Dillards
- Dion DiMucci
- Plácido Domingo
- Val Doonican
- Danny Doyle
- The Dubliners
- Bob Dylan
- Marianne Faithfull
- José Feliciano
- Cathy Fink & Marcy Marxer
- The Fireballs
- Flatt & Scruggs
- Marie Fredriksson
- The Fureys
- Bob Gibson
- Nanci Griffith
- Larry Groce
- Arlo Guthrie
- Noel Harrison
- Carolyn Hester
- The Highwaymen
- Anne Hills
- Mary Hopkin
- The Irish Rovers
- Jim and Jean
- Norah Jones
- The Kingston Trio
- Kite
- Hank Locklin
- Vera Lynn
- Jim McCann
- The Chad Mitchell Trio
- Nana Mouskouri
- The Move
- Anne Murray
- Willie Nelson
- Dan Nichols
- Daniel O'Donnell
- Esther Ofarim
- Gram Parsons
- Dolly Parton and Porter Wagoner
- Herb Pedersen
- Fred Penner
- Peter, Paul and Mary
- The Pogues
- Charley Pride
- Punch Brothers
- Paddy Reilly with The Dubliners
- Tony Rice
- Dave Van Ronk
- Schooner Fare
- Pete Seeger
- Raffi
- The Seekers
- Sharon, Lois & Bram
- Jean Shepard
- Simon & Garfunkel
- Patrick Sky
- Hank Snow
- The Spinners
- Tiny Tim
- Mel Tormé
- The Vejtables
- Bamses Venner
- Bobby Vinton
- Hannes Wader
- Doc Watson
- The Weavers
- Clarence White
- Wally Whyton
- Delroy Wilson
- Kate Wolf
- Glenn Yarbrough
- Francesco Guccini
