= Time Passes By =

Studio album by Kathy Mattea
- Released: March 19, 1991
- Studio: Jack's Tracks (Nashville, Tennessee); Dunkeld Records (Scotland)
- Genre: Country
- Label: Mercury; PolyGram
- Producer: Dougie MacLean; Kathy Mattea; Allen Reynolds; Jon Vezner

Kathy Mattea chronology
A Collection of Hits (1990)	Time Passes By (1991)	Lonesome Standard Time (1992)

Singles from Time Passes By
- 1. "Time Passes By" Released: March 9, 1991; 2. "Whole Lotta Holes" Released: July 6, 1991; 3. "Asking Us to Dance" Released: October 19, 1991

Professional ratings
Review scores
Source	Rating
AllMusic	link
Entertainment Weekly	A link
Los Angeles Times	link
The Rolling Stone Album Guide	1992

Time Passes By is the sixth studio album by American country music artist Kathy Mattea. It was released in 1991 (see 1991 in country music) on Mercury Records. The album, like her last two studio albums before it, was certified gold by the RIAA. Singles released from it include the title track at #7, "Whole Lotta Holes" at #18, and "Asking Us to Dance" at #27. "From a Distance" was originally recorded by Nanci Griffith and later versions were released by Bette Midler and Judy Collins.

The album was produced by Allen Reynolds except "From a Distance", which Mattea co-produced with Jon Vezner and Dougie MacLean.

== Track listing ==
No.	Title	Writer(s)	Length
1.	"Time Passes By"	Jon Vezner, Susan Longacre	2:44
2.	"Whole Lotta Holes"	Vezner, Don Henry	2:57
3.	"What Could Have Been"	Beth Nielsen Chapman	3:40
4.	"Asking Us to Dance"	Hugh Prestwood	4:19
5.	"Summer of My Dreams"	David Mallett	4:00
6.	"Harley"	Henry	3:31
7.	"Quarter Moon"	Bob Millard	3:37
8.	"I Wear Your Love"	Gary Burr	4:07
9.	"A Few Good Things Remain"	Pat Alger, Vezner	3:56
10.	"Ready for the Storm"	Dougie MacLean	3:56
11.	"From a Distance"	Julie Gold	4:57

== Personnel ==
Adapted from Time Passes By liner notes.

- Kathy Mattea – vocals, tambourine (4), acoustic guitar (7, 11), harmony vocals (10), bodhrán (11), boomerangs (11)
- Pete Wasner – acoustic piano (1–3, 8, 10)
- Catherine Styron – acoustic piano (4)
- Bobby Wood – keyboards (4, 7), organ (8, 9)
- Matt Rollings – acoustic piano (5)
- Chris Leuzinger – acoustic guitar (1–3, 8), electric guitars (7, 10), acoustic slide guitar (7)
- Mark Howard – acoustic guitar (3), mandolin (3)
- Bill Cooley – acoustic guitars (4)
- John Mock – acoustic guitar (5), string arrangements (5)
- Mark Casstevens – acoustic guitar (6)
- Pat Flynn – acoustic guitar (8)
- Pat Alger – acoustic guitar (9)
- Dougie MacLean – acoustic guitars (10, 11), harmony vocals (10), digeridoo (11), Overton whistle (11), congas (11)
- Jerry Douglas – dobro (1, 2)
- Mark O'Connor – mandolin (4), fiddle (6)
- Stuart Duncan – mandolin (8)
- Jonathan Yudkin – mandolin (10)
- Bruce Bouton – steel guitar (8, 9)
- Duncan Mullins – bass (1, 2)
- Glenn Worf – bass (3, 6)
- Bob Wray – bass (4, 7–10)
- Edgar Meyer – acoustic bass (4)
- Dave Pomeroy – bass (5)
- Milton Sledge – drums (1–3, 7–10), percussion (1, 2)
- Kenny Malone – drums (4, 6)
- Tom Roady – percussion (7, 10)
- Rob Hajacos – fiddle (1, 2)
- Will Smith – autoharp (3)
- Blair String Quartet (Grace Mihi Bahng, Connie Heard, John Kochanowski and Christian Teal) – strings (5)
- Gary West – great Highland bagpipe (11)
- Trisha Yearwood – harmony vocals (1, 8)
- The Roches – harmony vocals (2)
- Emmylou Harris – harmony vocals (3)
- Craig Bickhardt – harmony vocals (4)
- Ashley Cleveland – harmony vocals (8)
- John Thompson – harmony vocals (8)
- Event in a Tent Memorial Choir – harmony vocals (11)

== Production ==
- Allen Reynolds – producer (1–10)
- Dougie MacLean – producer (11), engineer (11)
- Kathy Mattea – producer (11)
- Jon Vezner – producer (11), engineer (11)
- Mark Miller – recording (1–10), mixing
- Denny Purcell – mastering at Georgetown Masters (Nashville, Tennessee)
- Barnes & Company – album graphics
- Bill Barnes – art direction, design
- Jim "Señor" McGuire – photography
- Valerie Cole – make-up
- Cindy Temple – hair
- Sherrie McCoy – wardrobe stylist
- Ann Rice – wardrobe stylist
- Bob Titley – management

== Charts ==
=== Weekly charts ===
Chart (1991)	Peak position
US Billboard 200	72
US Top Country Albums (Billboard)	9

=== Year-end charts ===
Chart (1991)	Position
US Top Country Albums (Billboard)	42

== Release history ==
Release history and formats for Time Passes By
Region	Date	Format	Label	Ref.
North America	August 7, 1990	LP; CD; cassette	PolyGram; Mercury Records	
