= Vozzo =

Vozzo is an Italian surname. Notable people with the surname include:

- Ann Marie Vozzo (born 1984), Australian soccer player
- Michael Vozzo, Australian football umpire
- Stephanie Vozzo (born 1966), American artist
- Vince Vozzo (born 1954), Australian artist
