= Buffalo Rose =

American modern folk band

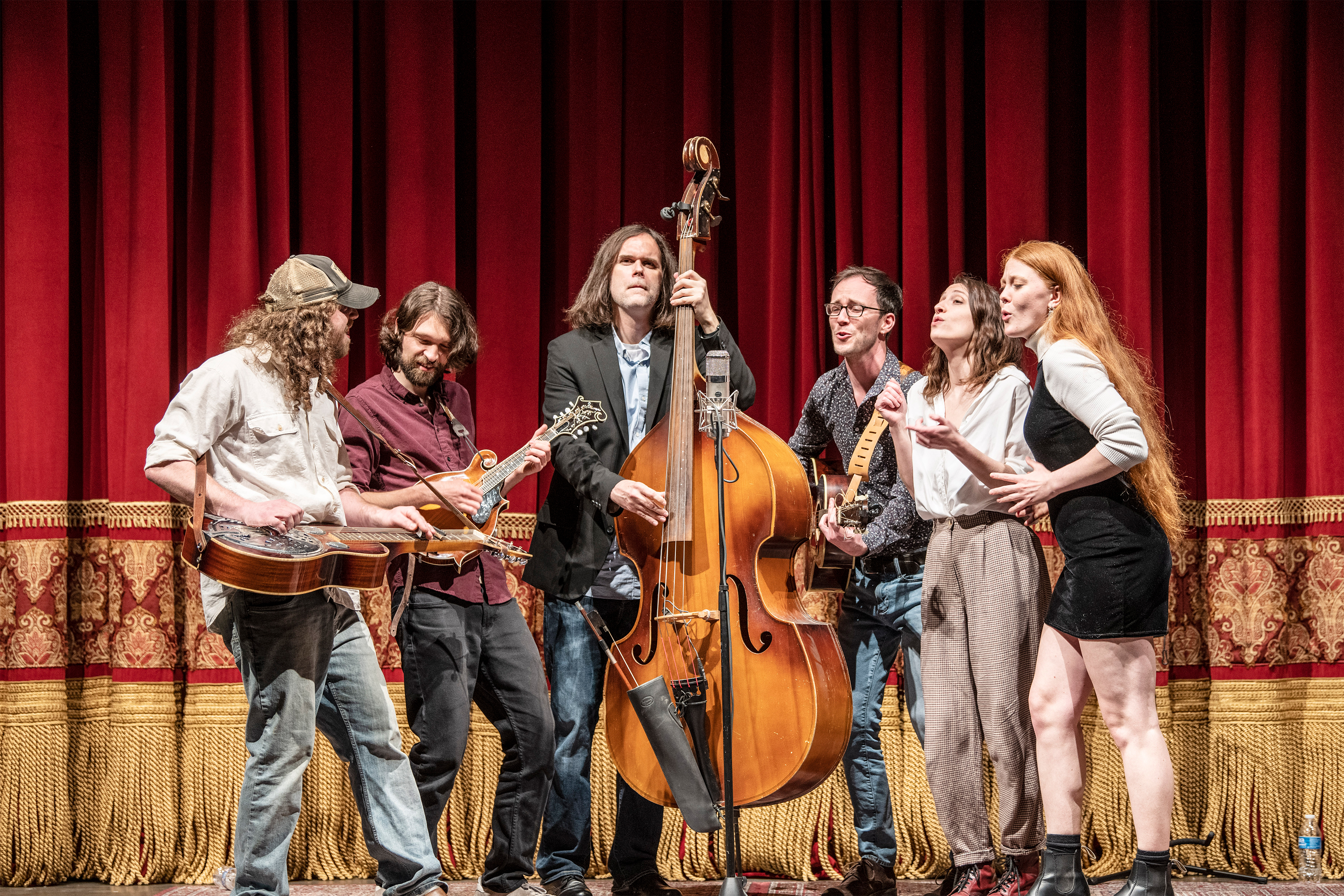
- Buffalo Rose live at The Palace Theatre in 2021

Background information
- Origin: Pittsburgh, Pennsylvania, U.S.
- Genres: Americana, American folk music, modern folk music
- Years active: 2016–present
- Label: Misra Records
- Members: Shane McLaughlin; Lucy Clabby; Margot Jezerc; Mac Inglis; Bryce Rabideau; Jason Rafalak
- Past members: Mariko Reid; Rosanna Spindler
- Website: buffalorosemusic.com

Buffalo Rose is a modern folk/Americana band from Pittsburgh, Pennsylvania.

The current lineup includes singers Lucy Clabby, Margot Jezerc, and Shane McLaughlin (who also plays acoustic guitar), Malcolm "Mac" Inglis on dobro, Bryce Rabideau on mandolin, and Jason Rafalak on upright bass. Past members include singers Mariko Reid and Rosanna Spindler.

The band's style has been compared to The Lumineers and First Aid Kit, and the band has shared stages with acts such as The Infamous Stringdusters, Pokey LaFarge, and Tyler Childers. Group members have also cited influences including Crosby, Stills, Nash & Young, the Punch Brothers, and Joni Mitchell.

== History ==
The band originally formed when singers Shane McLaughlin, Lucy Clabby, and Mariko Reid joined with dobro player Mac Inglis to perform a rendition of the song “Momma Have Mercy” for the FoundSound Songwriter Series. The success of that performance led to the creation of a permanent group, subsequently rounded out by Bryce Rabideau and Jason Rafalak. They released their debut EP, Red Wagon, just six months later in November 2016. The response was enthusiastic, and the group was encouraged enough to start work on a full-length record. The resulting album, The Soil and the Seed, was released in March 2018 and was later named one of the top local albums of the decade. The album resulted the group being featured on radio stations 91.3 WYEP, 102.5 WDVE, and the "Friday Night Rocks" series on AT&T SportsNet Pittsburgh for Pittsburgh Pirates home games.

With Rosanna Spindler replacing Mariko Reid (who left to join blues-rock group The Commonheart) in the fall of 2018, the band began to move in a more pop-informed direction with their single "Rocketship" released in March 2019. Soon after, the band was featured on NPR Music's All Songs Considered for their Tiny Desk Concerts submission of the song "Born", and also began work on recording what would become the Big Stampede EP before signing to Misra Records in the fall of 2019. Big Stampede was released November 2019 by Misra, and the song "I Feel So Good" from the EP went on to reach number one at 91.3 WYEP in March 2020.

The band announced a follow-up record, Borrowed & Blue: Live Around One Microphone, which was released in May 2020. The six-song EP received positive reviews throughout the American folk community, with Bluegrass Today writing, “Anyone who has tried recording live knows how that process exposes imperfections, and doing so with a lone microphone requires tremendous preparation and careful attention to your performance within the band setting. But this young sextet is up to the task.” American Songwriter called it "light, delicate, poised, and calming," while Americana Highways warned readers, “Don’t be surprised if the vocals give you goosebumps.” Music Mecca summed up many responses by describing it as "a must-listen for everyone with ears."

In the summer of 2020, amid the ongoing COVID-19 pandemic, Spindler left the group, replaced by singer Margot Jezerc to create the band's final lineup. Jezerc first appeared on the 2021 single "I Can See Clearly Now", a cover of the Johnny Nash classic featuring R&B singer INEZ (later named one of the best songs of the year by WYEP).

Concurrently, while performing at the 2020 Folk Alliance International conference in New Orleans, the band was introduced to folk music legend Tom Paxton. Through their booking agent Stephanie Coronado (who was a mutual acquaintance), the band later reconnected with Paxton and began co-writing songs together. The first of these songs to be made public appeared on the EP Rabbit, credited to both Paxton and Buffalo Rose. Ahead of its release in February 2022, lead single "I Give You the Morning" reached number one on the FAI Folk Charts.

Following completion of Rabbit, the band announced that they had also finished recording their second full-length album, to be released at a later date.

== Awards, honors, and nominations ==
=== Awards ===
- Overall Grand Prize Winner - 18th Annual IAMA (International Acoustic Music Awards)
- Best of Pittsburgh 2021 - Pittsburgh City Paper

=== Honors ===
- 2022 Official Showcasing Artist - South by Southwest
- 2022 Official Showcasing Artist - Folk Alliance International
- January 2022 FAI Folk Chart, #1 Song - "I Give You the Morning"
- January 2022 FAI Folk Chart, #6 Album - Rabbit
- January 2022 FAI Folk Chart, #7 Artist - Buffalo Rose & Tom Paxton
- WYEP Best Songs of 2021 - "I Can See Clearly Now"

== Discography ==
=== Albums ===
- The Soil and the Seed (self-released, 2018)
- Again, Again, Again (Misra Records, 2022)

=== EPs ===
- Red Wagon (self-released, 2016)
- Big Stampede (Misra Records, 2019)
- Borrowed & Blue: Live Around One Microphone (Misra Records, 2020)
- Rabbit (Misra Records, 2022) - with Tom Paxton

=== Singles ===
- The Last One (self-released, 2017)
- Rocketship (self-released, 2019)
- Rocketship (Chalk Dinosaur Remix) (Misra Records, 2020)
- The Cosmos and the Canyon (Misra Records, 2020)
- I Can See Clearly Now (featuring INEZ) (Misra Records, 2021)
