= Lonesome Standard Time =

Studio album by Kathy Mattea
- Released: September 22, 1992
- Studio: Creative Recording (Berry Hill, Tennessee)
- Genre: Country; bluegrass
- Length: 32:44
- Label: Mercury; PolyGram
- Producer: Brent Maher

Kathy Mattea chronology
| Time Passes By (1991) | Lonesome Standard Time (1992) | Good News (1993) |

Singles from Lonesome Standard Time
- 1. "Lonesome Standard Time" Released: September 1992; 2. "Standing Knee Deep in a River (Dying of Thirst)" Released: January 1993; 3. "Seeds" Released: April 1993; 4. "Listen to the Radio" Released: August 1993

Lonesome Standard Time is the seventh studio album by American country artist Kathy Mattea. It was released on September 22, 1992, via PolyGram and Mercury Records. It was recorded during a period when she was experiencing vocal challenges. The project featured songs about heartbreak and loss written by various Nashville writers. It received a mixed critical response, but certified gold in the United States. The album spawned four singles. Both the title track and "Standing Knee Deep in a River (Dying of Thirst)" reached the American country chart top 20 in 1993.

== Background ==
Kathy Mattea reached her commercial and career peak by 1992. She had four singles that topped the American country chart won several accolades from the Country Music Association and the Grammy Awards. She was also headlining her own tours. In June 1992, Mattea experienced a busted blood vessel on her vocal chords, which caused her to have surgery. She ended up cancelling several engagements but made a full recovery. All the while, she was making her next studio album titled Lonesome Standard Time. "I feel like I was singing at the peak of anything I've ever done . . . . About halfway through the vocals, this happened," she told The Washington Post. Despite the vocal setback, Mattea finished the project.

== Recording and content ==
Lonesome Standard Time was made at Creative Recording Incorporated, a studio located in Nashville, Tennessee. The album was produced by Brent Maher, who was known for his previous work with The Judds. The album's material was described as introspective while having a production that mixed country with Appalachian and bluegrass styles. Mattea herself described the album as being about "love-lost and inner-soul-searching". She compared its sound to that of her previous album projects. The album included material composed by various musical artists. The sixth track, "Listen to the Radio", was penned by Nanci Griffith. "Amarillo" was co-written by Rodney Crowell and Emmylou Harris. Another track, "Slow Boat", was co-written by Mattea's husband (and songwriter) Jon Vezner. The album's third track, "Standing Knee Deep in a River (Dying of Thirst)", was also recorded by Don Williams around the same time. The eighth track, "33, 45, 78", was composed by Washington D.C. native, Steve Key.

== Critical reception ==
Professional ratings
Review scores
| Source | Rating |
|---|---|
| AllMusic | 4.5/5 stars |
| Entertainment Weekly | B |

Lonesome Standard Time received mixed reviews from critics and journalists. Jack Hurst of The Chicago Tribune praised the album, commenting that it "offers the kind of arresting music the imaginative title would seem to promise". Meanwhile Alanna Nash of Entertainment Weekly rated the album a "B". Nash found it to be "too reverent and sluggish, and not even the driving bluegrass of the title tune is enough to transcend the album's ultrareflective mood". Brian Mansfield of AllMusic rated it 4.5 out of 5 stars and commented, "Lonesome Standard Time isn't as ambitious as Time Passes By, but it's filled with lovely performances from Mattea's favorite sources: bluegrass ("Lonesome Standard Time"), gospel-influenced country ("Standing Knee Deep in a River (Dying of Thirst)") and Nanci Griffith ("Listen to the Radio").

== Release, chart performance and singles ==
Lonesome Standard Time was released on September 22, 1992, on the PolyGram and Mercury labels. It was originally distributed as a compact disc and as a cassette. In the 2000s and 2010s, it was released digitally for download and streaming purposes. The album first entered the American Billboard Top Country Albums chart on October 24, 1992. It did not climb higher until a 39 percent sales increase in March 1993 brought the album to the number 41 position. It also peaked at the number 182 position on the Billboard 200 chart on October 31, 1992, after seven weeks there. In November 1994, the album certified gold from the Recording Industry Association of America after selling over 500,000 copies. It became her fourth album to receive a certification from the RIAA.

The album spawned a total of four singles between 1992 and 1993. The title track was the first single released and was issued by PolyGram/Mercury in September 1992. By December 1992, the single reached the top 20 of the Billboard Hot Country Songs chart, peaking at the number 11 position. On Canada's RPM Country chart, the single reached the number 14 position. It was followed by the release of "Standing Knee Deep in a River (Dying of Thirst)" in January 1993. The single also reached the Billboard country top 20, peaking at number 19 in April 1993. On the RPM country chart, it reached number 24 around the same period. It was then followed by the release of "Seeds" in April 1993. The song later peaked at number 50 on the Billboard country chart in June 1993. The final single spawned from the album was "Listen to the Radio" in August 1993. Later that month, the song peaked at number 64 on the Hot Country Songs. It was Mattea's lowest charting single up to that point.

== Track listing ==
CD and digital versions
| No. | Title | Writer(s) | Length |
|---|---|---|---|
| 1. | "Lonesome Standard Time" | Larry Cordle; Jim Rushing | 2:50 |
| 2. | "Lonely at the Bottom" | Jan Dowling; Mike Dowling | 3:14 |
| 3. | "Standing Knee Deep in a River (Dying of Thirst)" | Bucky Jones; Dickey Lee; Bob McDill | 4:12 |
| 4. | "Forgive and Forget" | Kieran Kane | 2:52 |
| 5. | "Last Night I Dreamed of Loving You" | Hugh Moffat | 3:31 |
| 6. | "Listen to the Radio" | Nanci Griffith | 2:59 |
| 7. | "Slow Boat" | George Teren; Jon Vezner | 2:59 |
| 8. | "33, 45, 78 (Record Time)" | Steve Key | 2:57 |
| 9. | "Amarillo" | Rodney Crowell; Emmylou Harris | 3:07 |
| 10. | "Seeds" | Pat Alger; Ralph Murphy | 3:47 |
| Total length: | | | 32:44 |

== Personnel ==
All credits are adapted from the liner notes of Lonesome Standard Time and AllMusic.

Musical personnel

- Kathy Mattea – lead vocals, backing vocals (5)
- Steve Nathan – acoustic piano (1, 9)
- Matt Rollings – acoustic piano (2, 8)
- Bobby Ogdin – organ (3)
- Pete Wasner – acoustic piano (3, 7)
- John Barlow Jarvis – acoustic piano (5, 6)
- Bill Cooley – electric guitar (1, 5, 8, 9), acoustic guitar (4)
- Don Potter – acoustic guitar, electric guitar (10)
- Bernie Leadon – acoustic guitar (2, 6), acoustic slide guitar (5), electric slide guitar (5), electric guitar (6)
- Larry Byrom – electric guitar (3, 7), acoustic guitar (7)
- Russ Pahl – dobro (2), steel guitar (8)
- Sonny Garrish – steel guitar (3, 5–7, 9)
- Jerry Douglas – dobro (4)
- Duncan Mullins – bass
- Eddie Bayers – drums (1–9)
- Farrell Morris – percussion (5, 6)
- Jonathan Yudkin – violin (1, 4, 8, 9), mandolin (8)
- The Nashville String Machine – strings (3)
- Archie Jordan – string arrangements (3)
- Carl Gorodetzky – string contractor (3)
- Kathy Chiavola – backing vocals (1, 10)
- Tim O'Brien – backing vocals (1, 5, 9)
- Vicki Hampton – backing vocals (2–4)
- Donna McElroy – backing vocals (2–4)
- Gerry Gillespie – backing vocals (6, 8)
- Christie Westmoreland – backing vocals (6, 8, 9)
- Gary Burr – backing vocals (7, 10)

Production personnel

- Brent Maher – producer, engineer, mixing
- Mills Logan – assistant engineer
- Jim McKell – assistant engineer, mix assistant
- Glenn Meadows – mastering at Masterfonics (Nashville, Tennessee)
- Barnes & Company – album graphics
- Bill Barnes – art direction, design
- Jim "Señor" McGuire – photography
- Mary Beth Felts – make-up
- Robert Davis – hair
- Ann Rice – wardrobe stylist
- Bob Titley – management

== Charts ==
| Chart (1992–1993) | Peak position |
|---|---|
| US Billboard 200 | 182 |
| US Top Country Albums (Billboard) | 41 |

== Certifications ==
Certifications for Lonesome Standard Time
| Region | Certification | Certified units/sales |
|---|---|---|
| United States (RIAA) | Gold | 500,000^{^} |
^{^} Shipments figures based on certification alone.

== Release history ==
Release history and formats for Lonesome Standard Time
| Region | Date | Format | Label | Ref. |
|---|---|---|---|---|
| Australia | September 22, 1992 | Compact disc | PolyGram; Mercury Records | |
| North America | September 22, 1992 | CD; cassette | PolyGram; Mercury Records | |
| North America | 2000s–2010s | Music download; streaming | Mercury Records | |
