= Rambling Boy =

Rambling Boy may refer to:

- Ramblin' Boy, a 1964 album by Tom Paxton
- Rambling Boy (Charlie Haden album), 2008
