= Redemption Road (album) =

Studio album by Tom Paxton
- Released: 6 January 2015 (streaming); 10 March 2015 (CD)
- Genre: Folk
- Label: Pax
- Producer: Jim Rooney

Tom Paxton chronology
Comedians and Angels (2008)	Redemption Road (2015)	Boat in the Water (2017)

Redemption Road is the sixty-first album by American folk singer-songwriter Tom Paxton, released in March 2015.

== Overview ==
Over 60 days, from 30 July 2014 to 28 September 2014, Tom Paxton called on Kickstarter's services to finance his new studio album, collecting a $32,177 pledge (of a $20,000 goal) from 552 backers. Though the album was not officially released until 10 March 2015, it was recorded in 2014, and can be fully streamed on Tom's official SoundCloud page since 6 January 2015.

== Track listing ==
All songs by Tom Paxton unless otherwise noted.

1. "Virginia Morning" - 3:42
2. "Susie Most of All" - 2:31
3. "Time to Spare" - 3:55
4. "The Losing Part" - 3:48
5. "Skeeters'll Gitcha" - 2:23
6. "Ireland" - 4:08
7. "Come On, Holy" (Tom Paxton, Jon Vezner) - 2:56
8. "If the Poor Don't Matter" - 3:26
9. "The Mayor of MacDougal Street" - 4:01
10. "Central Square" - 4:40
11. "Buffalo Dreams" - 4:17
12. "The Battle of the Sexes" - 2:55
13. "Redemption Road" (Geoff Bartley, Tom Paxton) - 3:44
14. "The Parting Glass" (Traditional) - 1:37

== Personnel ==
=== Musicians ===
- Tom Paxton – lead vocal, acoustic guitar, arranger
- Al Perkins – dobro
- Cathy Fink – banjo, vocal harmony
- Tim Crouch – fiddle, mandolin
- Geoff Bartley – National steel guitar
- Robin Bullock – cittern, acoustic guitar
- Mark Howard – acoustic guitar
- Dave Pomeroy – upright bass
- Pete Wasner – piano, Wurlitzer
- Kirk "Jelly Roll" Johnson – harmonica
- John Mock – whistle
- Pat McInerney – drums

=== Vocalists ===
- Suzi Ragsdale – Vocal harmony
- John Wesley Ryles – Vocal harmony
- Marcy Marxer – Vocal harmony
- John Prine – Quotation author, lead vocal on "Skeeters'll Gitcha"
- Janis Ian – Vocal harmony on "Redemption Road"

=== Production and cover art ===
- Jim Rooney – Producer
- David Ferguson – Engineer, mixing
- Cathy Fink – Cover photo, engineer, executive producer, inside photo
- Pete Wasner – Engineer
- Sean Sullivan – Assistant engineer, mixing assistant
- Dave Shipley – Mastering
