= Jennifer Paxton =

American historian

- Known for: Research on twelfth-century English monastic chronicles; Director of the University Honors Program at The Catholic University of America

Academic background
- Education: Yale University (B.A., 1987) Harvard University (A.M., 1990; Ph.D., 1999)
- Doctoral advisor: Thomas N. Bisson

Jennifer Paxton is an American medieval historian and academic administrator. She holds the position of Associate Professor of History and serves as Director of the University Honors Program at The Catholic University of America (CUA) in Washington, D.C. Her scholarship focuses on medieval England, especially on monastic writing, memory, identity and community in the twelfth century.

== Early life and education ==
Paxton is one of the two daughters of American folk singer-songwriter Tom Paxton (born October 31, 1937) and his wife Midge Paxton (1945-2014). She earned her Bachelor of Arts in History from Yale University in May 1987, graduating summa cum laude with Distinction in History. She then proceeded to Harvard University, where she completed an A.M. in History in June 1990 and a Ph.D. in History in June 1999. Her doctoral dissertation was titled Charter and Chronicle in Twelfth-Century England: The House Histories of the Fenland Abbeys, supervised by Professor Thomas N. Bisson.

== Academic career ==
At CUA, Paxton became Assistant Director of the University Honors Program in June 2013, and in June 2016 assumed the post of Director of the program. In her department, she has been appointed Clinical Assistant Professor (Fall 2013–present), and previously served as Visiting Clinical Assistant Professor (Fall 2010–Spring 2013). She is also a Professorial Lecturer in History at Georgetown University (Spring 1998, Fall 1999–present), teaching courses including “From the Fall of Rome to the Millennium”, “Medieval Monasticism”, and “History of Ireland”. Her teaching at CUA includes undergraduate and graduate courses such as HIST 216A: Medieval Britain; HIST 236A: The World of the Crusades; HIST 380A: Medieval Ireland; HIST 609/610: Medieval Civilization I & II; HIST 643A: Medieval Monasticism; and HIST 805: Research Seminar in Medieval England. Paxton has also produced lecture series for The Great Courses (now Wondrium) on topics such as Medieval Britain: From King Arthur to the Tudor Conquest, The Celtic World, 1066: The Year That Changed Everything, and England: From the Fall of Rome to the Norman Conquest.

== Research interests and contributions ==
Paxton’s primary research explores how monastic communities in twelfth-century England used historical texts—especially chronicles and charters—to assert identity, status, rights, and memory in the period following the Norman Conquest (1066) and the civil war during the reign of King Stephen (1135–1153). Another strand of her work examines evolving concepts of abbatial leadership across the Anglo-Norman world in the eleventh and twelfth centuries. Her book manuscript Chronicle and Community in Twelfth-Century England is under contract with Oxford University Press.

== Selected publications ==
- Paxton, Jennifer. “Fighting the Last War: Remembering the Norman Conquest during the Anarchy.” In John D. Hosler & Steven Isaac (eds.), Military Cultures and Martial Enterprises in the Middle Ages: Essays in Honour of Richard P. Abels. Woodbridge: Boydell & Brewer, 2020, pp. 117–135.
- Paxton, Jennifer. “Lords and Monks: Creating an Ideal of Noble Power in Monastic Chronicles.” In Robert F. Berkhofer III, Alan Cooper & Adam J. Costo (eds.), The Experience of Power in Medieval Europe, 950-1350. Aldershot: Ashgate, 2005, pp. 227–236.
- Paxton, Jennifer. “Textual Communities in the English Fenlands: A Lay Audience for Monastic Chronicles?” Anglo-Norman Studies 26 (2004 for 2003): 123-137.
- Paxton, Jennifer. “Forging Communities: Memory and Identity in Post-Conquest England.” Haskins Society Journal 10 (2002 for 2001): 95-109.
- Paxton, Jennifer. “Monks and Bishops: The Purpose of the Liber Eliensis.” Haskins Society Journal 11 (2003 for 1998): 17-30.
- Paxton, Jennifer. “The Book of Ely.” In T. F. Head (ed.), Medieval Hagiography: A Sourcebook. New York: Garland, 2000, pp. 459–494.

== Honors, administrative service and public engagement ==
Paxton has earned fellowships including a Mellon Fellowship in the Humanities and a Frank Knox Memorial Fellowship.

She served as Undergraduate Advisor for the Program in Medieval and Byzantine Studies at CUA from June 2011 to June 2013, and resumed from September 2014 to present.

As Director of the University Honors Program, she guides the honors curriculum, emphasizing seminar-based liberal arts inquiry, global citizenship, and the residential honors community.

She also lectures for Smithsonian Associates and Smithsonian Journeys on Irish, Scottish, and British history.

== Personal and public engagement ==
Paxton is active in mentoring undergraduate research and promoting liberal-arts education at CUA. She has participated in university interviews about the role of the humanities.
