= Lonesome Standard Time (song) =

Single by Kathy Mattea

from the album Lonesome Standard Time
- B-side: "Asking Us to Dance"
- Released: September 1992
- Genre: Country
- Length: 2:51
- Label: Mercury
- Songwriters: Larry Cordle; Jim Rushing
- Producer: Brent Maher

Kathy Mattea singles chronology
"Asking Us to Dance" (1991)	"Lonesome Standard Time" (1992)	"Standing Knee Deep in a River (Dying of Thirst)" (1992)

"Lonesome Standard Time" is a song written by Larry Cordle and Jim Rushing, and recorded by American country music artist Kathy Mattea. It was released in September 1992 as the first single and title track from her album Lonesome Standard Time. The song reached number 11 on the Billboard Hot Country Singles & Tracks chart in December 1992.

== Chart performance ==
Chart (1992)	Peak position
Canada Country Singles (RPM)	14
US Hot Country Songs (Billboard)	11
