= Wild in the Backyard =

Studio album by Don Henry
- Released: 1991
- Genre: Country
- Label: Epic
- Producers: Don Henry, Ray Kennedy

Don Henry chronology
Wild in the Backyard (1991)	Flowers and Rockets (2001)

Wild in the Backyard is the debut studio album by American country singer-songwriter Don Henry, released in 1991 on Epic Records. It was produced by Henry and Ray Kennedy, the latter of whom also engineered the album. It was named one of the 10 best albums of 1991 by both Billboard's Ken Schlager and BAM's Larry McClain. Some critics, such as Alanna Nash, compared it favorably to the music of Randy Newman. The album marked Henry's first full-length release on a major record label.

Professional ratings
Review scores
Source	Rating
AllMusic	4.5/5 stars
Christgau's Consumer Guide	(choice cut)
Entertainment Weekly	B+
Los Angeles Times	3.5/5 stars

== Track listing ==
No.	Title	Length
1.	"No Such Love"	2:56
2.	"Into a Mall"	4:04
3.	"Mr. God"	3:37
4.	"The Same Boat"	4:01
5.	"Harley"	4:02
6.	"L. Alien"	3:39
7.	"Heart Cut in Half"	3:28
8.	"Cadillac Avenue"	3:20
9.	"White House Keys"	3:34
10.	"Beautiful Fool"	4:34

== Personnel ==
- Engineering – Ray Kennedy
- Producer – Don Henry, Ray Kennedy
