= Standing Knee Deep in a River (Dying of Thirst) =

Single by Kathy Mattea

from the album Lonesome Standard Time
- B-side: "Listen to the Radio"
- Released: January 23, 1993
- Genre: Country
- Length: 4:10
- Label: Mercury
- Songwriters: Bob McDill, Dickey Lee, Bucky Jones
- Producer: Brent Maher

Kathy Mattea singles chronology
"Lonesome Standard Time" (1992)	"Standing Knee Deep in a River (Dying of Thirst)" (1993)	"Seeds" (1993)

"Standing Knee Deep in a River (Dying of Thirst)" is a song written by Bob McDill, Dickey Lee and Bucky Jones, and recorded by American country music artist Kathy Mattea. It was released in January 1993 as the second single from the album Lonesome Standard Time. The song reached number 19 on the Billboard Hot Country Singles & Tracks chart.

== Content ==
"Standing Knee Deep in a River (Dying of Thirst)" is a ballad, described by David Howell of the Edmonton Journal, as having a theme of "being grateful for what we have".

== Chart performance ==
Chart (1993)	Peak position
Canada Country Singles (RPM)	24
US Hot Country Songs (Billboard)	19
