= Time Passes By (song) =

Single by Kathy Mattea

from the album Time Passes By
- B-side: "What Could Have Been"
- Released: March 9, 1991
- Genre: Country
- Length: 2:47
- Label: Mercury
- Songwriters: Jon Vezner, Susan Longacre
- Producer: Allen Reynolds

Kathy Mattea singles chronology
"A Few Good Things Remain" (1990)	"Time Passes By" (1991)	"Whole Lotta Holes" (1991)

"Time Passes By" is a song written by Jon Vezner and Susan Longacre, and recorded by American country music artist Kathy Mattea. It was released in March 1991 as the first single and title track from the album Time Passes By. The song reached #7 on the Billboard Hot Country Singles & Tracks chart. The song features Trisha Yearwood on harmony vocals.

== Chart performance ==
Chart (1991)	Peak position
Canada Country Singles (RPM)	7
US Hot Country Songs (Billboard)	7

=== Year-end charts ===
Chart (1991)	Position
Canada Country Tracks (RPM)	85
