= Whole Lotta Holes =

1991 single by Kathy Mattea

Single by Kathy Mattea

from the album Time Passes By
- B-side: "Quarter Moon"
- Released: July 6, 1991
- Genre: Country
- Length: 3:14
- Label: Mercury
- Songwriters: Jon Vezner, Don Henry
- Producer: Allen Reynolds

Kathy Mattea singles chronology
| "Time Passes By" (1991) | "Whole Lotta Holes" (1991) | "Asking Us to Dance" (1991) |

"Whole Lotta Holes" is a song written by Jon Vezner and Don Henry, and recorded by American country music artist Kathy Mattea. It was released in July 1991 as the second single from the album Time Passes By. The song reached #18 on the Billboard Hot Country Singles & Tracks chart.

== Critical reception ==
The Roches provide background vocals.

Cash Box reviewer Kimmy Wix described the song favorably, saying that "another precious three minutes of Mattea's Time Passes By album, presents a whole lotta emotion and personal insight wrapped in a ballad that gets a little gutsy."

== Chart performance ==
| Chart (1991) | Peak position |
|---|---|
| Canada Country Singles (RPM) | 12 |
| US Hot Country Songs (Billboard) | 18 |
