= Asking Us to Dance =

Single by Kathy Mattea

from the album Time Passes By
- B-side: "Where've You Been
- Released: October 19, 1991
- Genre: Country
- Length: 4:23
- Label: Mercury
- Songwriter(s): Hugh Prestwood
- Producer(s): Allen Reynolds

Kathy Mattea singles chronology
"Whole Lotta Holes" (1991)	"Asking Us to Dance" (1991)	"Lonesome Standard Time" (1992)

"Asking Us to Dance" is a song recorded by American country music artist Kathy Mattea. It was released in October 1991 as the third single from the album Time Passes By. The song reached #27 on the Billboard Hot Country Singles & Tracks chart. The song was written by Hugh Prestwood.

== Chart performance ==
Chart (1991–1992)	Peak position
US Hot Country Songs (Billboard)	27
Canadian RPM Country Tracks	65
