= Don Henry (musician) =

American country music singer-songwriter

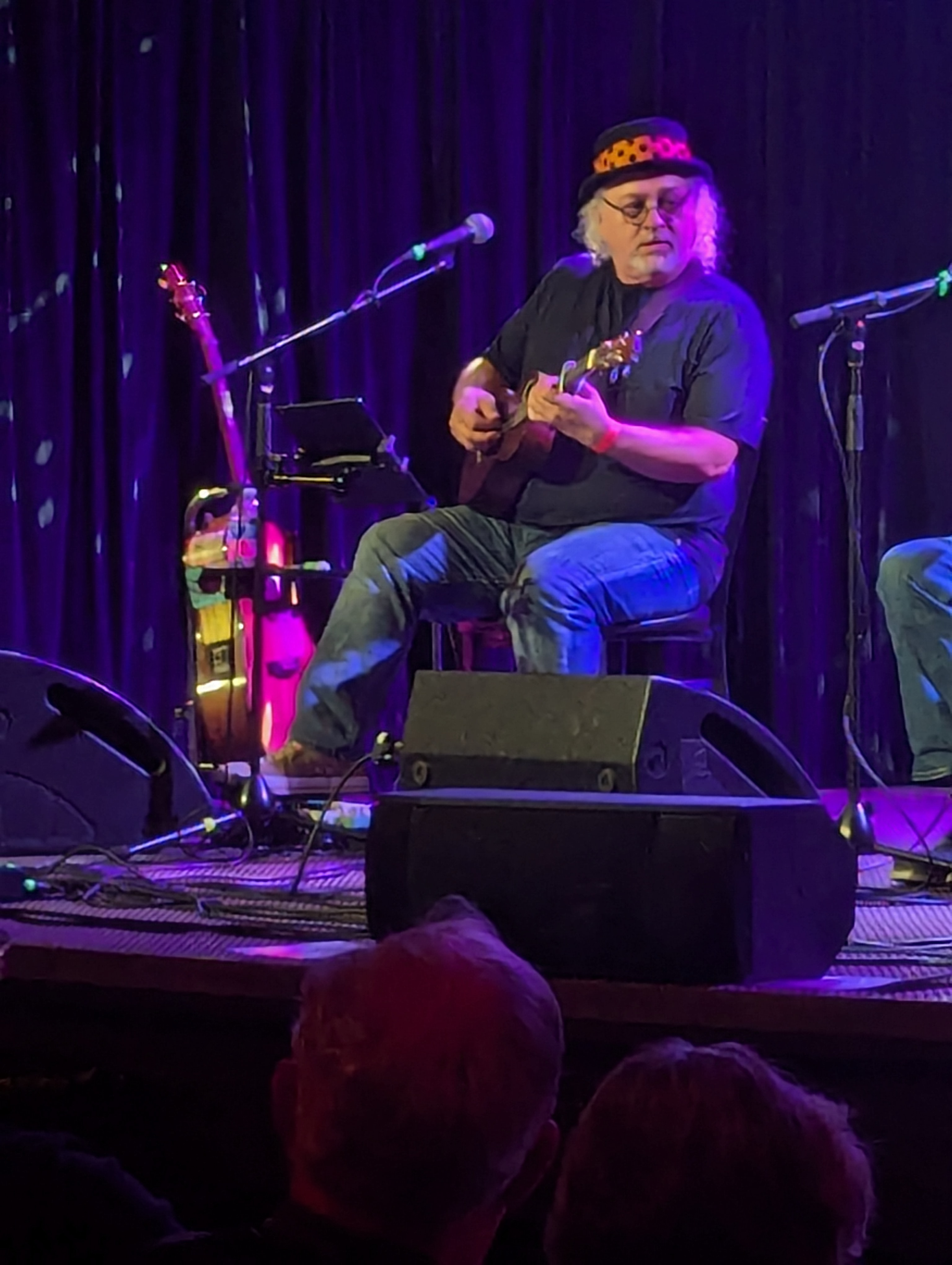
- Don Henry, 2024

Background information
- Born: December 30, 1959 (age 66); San Jose, California
- Genres: Country music
- Years active: 1990s–present
- Labels: Epic Records
- Website: www.donhenry.com

Don Henry (born December 30, 1959) is an American country music singer and songwriter. His career took off when the Kathy Mattea single "Where've You Been", which he co-wrote with Jon Vezner, won numerous awards in 1990 and 1991. These included the "song of the year" award at the 25th annual Academy of Country Music Awards in 1990, and a Grammy Award for Best Country Song at the 33rd Annual Grammy Awards. He went on to team up with Vezner to write another song, "Whole Lotta Holes", which was also later recorded by Kathy Mattea and released as a single.

In 1991, he released his first solo album, Wild in the Backyard, which was engineered and produced by Ray Kennedy. The album's music was favorably compared to the music of Randy Newman. The album was also named one of Billboard's top 10 records of 1991. Writing in Entertainment Weekly, Alanna Nash gave the album a B+ grade and described Henry as "One of Nashville’s best young tunesmiths".

He performs with Jon Vezner as The Don Juans; they accompanied Tom Paxton on his 2018 and 2019 UK tours.

== Discography ==
- Wild in the Backyard (Epic, 1991)
- Flowers and Rockets (Love Child, 2001)
- Falloween (Falloween Records, 2022)
