= Ramblin' Boy =

Studio album by Tom Paxton
- Released: 1964
- Recorded: Mastertone Studios, NYC
- Genre: Folk
- Length: 50:19 (reissue)
- Label: Elektra
- Producer: Paul Rothchild

Tom Paxton chronology
Ramblin' Boy (1964)	Ain't That News! (1965)

Ramblin' Boy is the debut album by American folk singer-songwriter Tom Paxton, released in 1964.

== History ==
Ramblin' Boy is referred to as Paxton's debut album, since it was his first album released on a major record label (Elektra Records), although he had previously released a live album recorded at The Gaslight Cafe in Greenwich Village entitled, I'm the Man That Built the Bridges (which was released on the small Gaslight label in 1962).

Three songs from Ramblin' Boy were frequently covered by other artists – the title song, "I Can't Help But Wonder Where I'm Bound" and "The Last Thing on My Mind". The latter song remains one of Paxton's most well-known compositions.

== Reception ==
Professional ratings
Review scores
Source	Rating
Allmusic	3/5 stars

Music critic Steven Leggett of Allmusic commented in his review that the album sounds "rather dated these days" due to the topical issues of the songs. He also writes: "What keeps 'Ramblin' Boy' from being just another period piece from the 1960s are a trio of songs in which Paxton swings away from trying to be relevant and brings a kind of restless and romantic self-analysis to the table. 'The Last Thing on My Mind', 'Ramblin' Boy', and 'I Can't Help But Wonder Where I'm Bound' all exhibit a classic, timeless appeal simply because they work to the positive side of emotional ennui."

== Reissues ==
- Ramblin' Boy was reissued on CD by Collectors' Choice in 2002 and 2008.
- Ramblin' Boy was reissued on CD by Elektra in 2005.

== Track listing ==
All songs by Tom Paxton unless otherwise noted.

1. "A Job of Work" – 2:44
2. "A Rumblin' in the Land" – 2:59
3. "When Morning Breaks" – 2:55
4. "Daily News" – 2:17
5. "What Did You Learn in School Today?" – 1:44
6. "The Last Thing on My Mind" – 3:05
7. "Harper" – 2:52
8. "Fare Thee Well, Cisco" – 3:04
9. "I Can't Help But Wonder Where I'm Bound" – 3:41
10. "High Sheriff of Hazard" (Paxton, Traditional) – 2:10
11. "My Lady's a Wild Flying Dove" – 3:11
12. "Standing on the Edge of Town" – 1:43
13. "I'm Bound for the Mountains and the Sea" – 3:04
14. "Goin' to the Zoo" – 2:29
15. "Ramblin' Boy" – 3:59

== Personnel ==
- Tom Paxton – vocals, acoustic guitar
- Barry Kornfeld – banjo, second acoustic guitar, harmonica
- Felix Pappalardi – guitarrón
- Jac Holzman – production supervisor
