= The Last Thing on My Mind =

1964 song by Tom Paxton

- 1985 German re-release

Song by Tom Paxton

from the album Ramblin' Boy
- Released: 1964
- Genre: Folk
- Label: Elektra
- Songwriter: Tom Paxton
- Producer: Paul A. Rothchild

"The Last Thing on My Mind" is a song written by the American musician and singer-songwriter Tom Paxton in the early 1960s and recorded first by Paxton in 1964. It is based on the traditional lament song "The Leaving of Liverpool". The song was released on Paxton's 1964 album Ramblin' Boy, which was his first album released on Elektra Records.

The song remains one of Paxton's best-known compositions.

== Composition ==
The song is based on the traditional lament song "The Leaving of Liverpool", and also builds on Bob Dylan's song "Farewell".

== Porter Wagoner and Dolly Parton version ==
"The Last Thing on My Mind"

Single by Porter Wagoner and Dolly Parton

from the album Just Between You and Me
- B-side: "Love Is Worth Living"
- Released: October 30, 1967
- Recorded: October 11, 1967
- Studio: RCA Studio B (Nashville)
- Genre: Country
- Length: 2:34
- Label: RCA Victor
- Songwriter: Tom Paxton
- Producer: Bob Ferguson

Porter Wagoner and Dolly Parton singles chronology
"The Last Thing on My Mind" (1967)	"Holding on to Nothin'" (1968)

"The Last Thing on My Mind" was covered by Porter Wagoner and Dolly Parton and released as their debut duet single on October 30, 1967, by RCA Victor. Their version peaked at No.7 on the Billboard Hot Country Singles chart, the first of an almost uninterrupted string of top ten singles they would release over the next several years.

=== Critical reception ===
The single was well received by critics upon release. Billboard gave a positive review of the single, which said that Wagoner and Parton's "initial outing should be a giant." They concluded by saying that "the folk-oriented ballad...has much pop potential." In another positive review, Cashbox called the single "a very effective updating of the contemporary folk ditty," with "an appealing blending of voices" which "makes this a good bet for big chart honors."

=== Commercial performance ===
"The Last Thing on My Mind" debuted at No.70 on the Billboard Hot Country Singles chart. It would eventually peak at No.7 and spend a total of 17 weeks on the chart. The single's B-side, "Love Is Worth Living", was successful in Canada, peaking at No.4 on the RPM Country Singles chart.

=== Track listing ===
- 7" single (RCA Victor 47-9369)
1. "The Last Thing on My Mind" (Tom Paxton) – 2:34
2. "Love Is Worth Living" (Dolly Parton) – 2:32

=== Personnel ===
Adapted from RCA recording session records.

- Jerry Carrigan – drums
- Anita Carter – background vocals
- Pete Drake – steel
- Dolores Edgin – background vocals
- Bob Ferguson – producer
- Roy M. Huskey Jr. – bass
- Mack Magaha – fiddle
- George McCormick – rhythm guitar
- Wayne Moss – electric guitar
- Dolly Parton – lead vocals
- Hargus Robbins – piano
- Buck Trent – banjo
- Porter Wagoner – lead vocals

=== Charts ===
"The Last Thing on My Mind"
Chart (1967–1968)	Peak position
US Hot Country Singles (Billboard)	7

"Love Is Worth Living"
Chart (1967–1968)	Peak position
Canada Country Singles (RPM)	4

== Dolly Parton solo version ==
A solo version by Dolly Parton was released on February 16, 2023, from the Doc Watson tribute album I Am a Pilgrim: Doc Watson at 100. The song was nominated for the 66th Grammy Awards in the Best Country Solo Performance category.

== Other recordings ==
The song has also been recorded by dozens of artists, including:

- Bill Anderson
- Chet Atkins
- Joan Baez
- Harry Belafonte
- Blitzen Trapper
- Bojoura
- Pat Boone
- Dennis Brown
- Chris de Burgh
- Glen Campbell
- The Carter Family
- Johnny Cash (with Diana Trask)
- Liam Clancy
- Gene Clark
- Judy Collins
- Cry, Cry, Cry
- Rick Danko
- Joe Dassin
- Sandy Denny
- John Denver
- Neil Diamond
- The Dillards
- Danny Doyle
- The Dubliners
- Phil Everly
- Marianne Faithfull
- José Feliciano
- Julie Felix
- Flatt and Scruggs
- Tompall & the Glaser Brothers
- Grateful Dead
- Noel Harrison
- Carolyn Hester
- Mary Hopkin
- Samuel Hui
- Joe and Eddie
- The Kingston Trio
- Hank Locklin
- Misty River
- The Chad Mitchell Trio
- Nana Mouskouri
- The Move
- Anne Murray
- Willie Nelson
- Daniel O'Donnell
- Gram Parsons
- Herb Pedersen
- Peter, Paul and Mary
- Punch Brothers
- Stu Phillips
- Charley Pride
- Paddy Reilly with The Dubliners
- Tony Rice
- The Seekers
- Jean Shepard
- Johnny Silvo
- Hank Snow
- Billy Strings
- Townes Van Zandt
- The Vejtables
- Clarence White
- Delroy Wilson
- Hannes Wader as "Ich werd' es überstehn (Last Thing On My Mind)" with German lyrics
- Doc Watson
- The Womenfolk
- The New Kentucky Colonels
