= The Don Juans (band) =

American folk music duo of Henry and Vezner

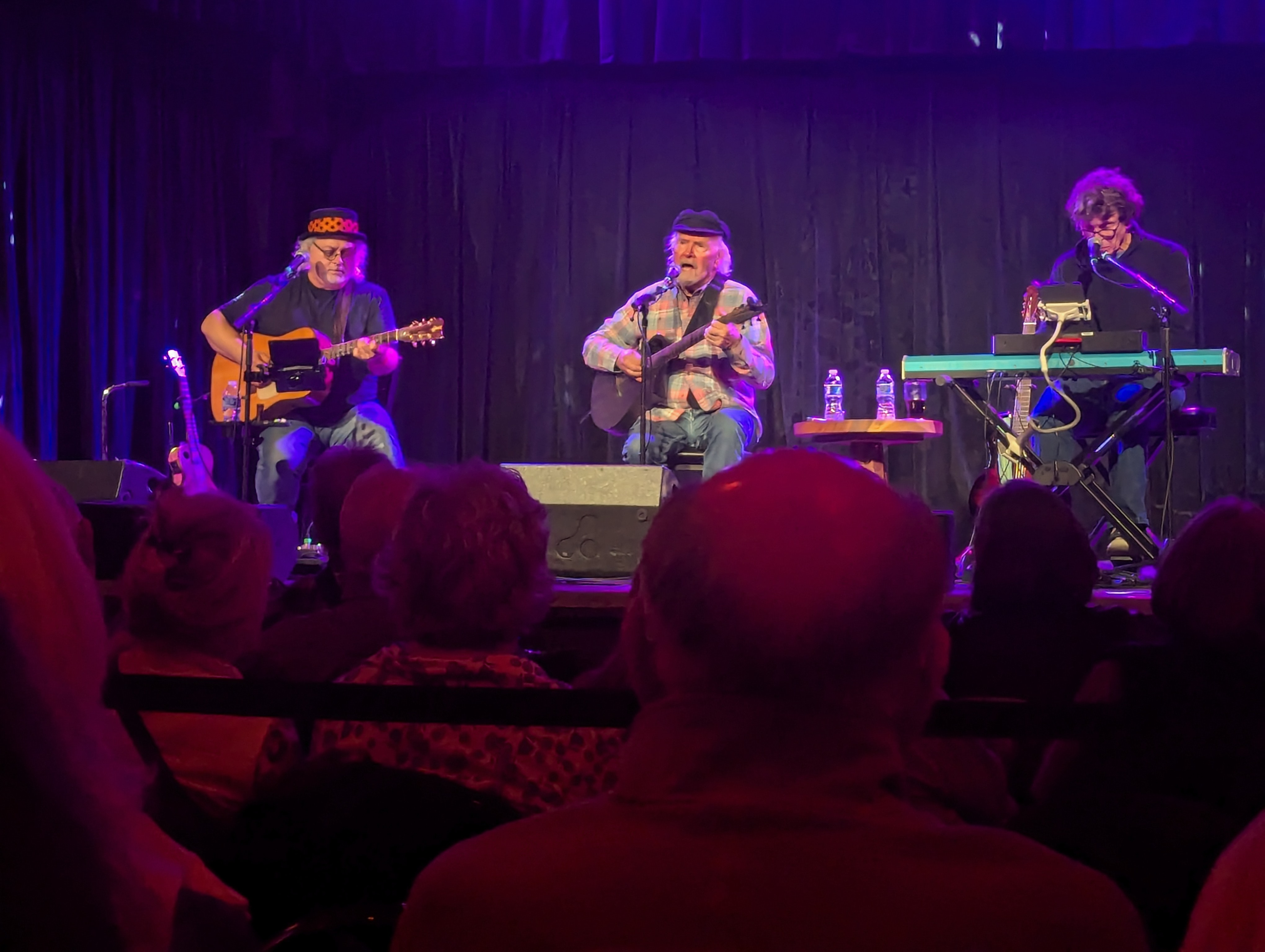
Tom Paxton and the Don Juans at the Spanish Ballroom, Tacoma, Washington, November 15, 2024. Left to right: Don Henry, Tom Paxton, Jon Vezner.

The Don Juans is an American folk and country music duo comprising Don Henry and Jon Vezner. They won a Grammy Award for writing the song "Where've You Been". They accompanied Tom Paxton on his 2018 and 2019 UK tours, at the 2024 Winnipeg Folk Festival and elsewhere.

They also accompanied Tom Paxton on October 26, 2024, at The Birchmere Music Hall in Arlington, Virginia. Also on the bill was Noel Paul Stookey of Peter, Paul and Mary fame who played the opening song with Paxton and a few songs with Paxton, Vezner and Henry as well as a set of his own. Jon Vezner is married to country and bluegrass artist Kathy Mattea.

Before being known as the Don Juans, Henry and Vezner won the 1990 Grammy Award for Best Country Song for their "Where've You Been".
