= Stephanie Vozzo =

American comic artist

Stephanie Coronado
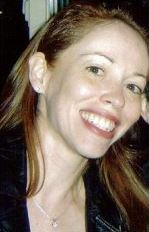
- Born: Stephanie Katz
- Occupation: Entertainment agent
- Board member of: Vice President, Folk Alliance Region Midwest

Stephanie Coronado (previously Vozzo, née Coronado-Katz) is a talent agent as well as a retired American comic book colorist.

== Biography ==
Coronado first discovered comic books through collecting Archie Comics Digests, Marvel and DC Comics in the late 1960s. Vozzo's first published works as a comic book colorist were in assisting her then-husband, colorist Daniel (sometimes credited as Dan/Danny) Vozzo, on his monthly DC Vertigo (also known as Vertigo Comics) titles including Doom Patrol vol. 2, Shade, the Changing Man (Vertigo) vol. 2, and Kid Eternity.

Vozzo's comic book industry career with Marvel Comics, DC Comics and Archie Comic Publications, Inc. spanned 24 years. She was largely responsible for the color palettes used in the entire run of Archie's Weird Mysteries and five of the seven Archie Comics 2007 story lines known as the "New look" series.

Vozzo's work includes Neil Gaiman's acclaimed The Sandman (Vertigo) beginning with the story line, The Sandman: A Game of You, DC Comics Scarlett #1–14 (1993–1994), Sonic the Hedgehog (Archie Comics) Creative Team, and Prince: Alter Ego, one-shot, DC Comics (Piranha Music, 1991) in which Noelle Giddings was incorrectly credited in the print issue.

=== Career as talent agent ===
Coronado is the Vice President of the Board for Folk Alliance Region Midwest (FARM), a regional chapter of Folk Alliance International (FAI). The organization promotes traditional, contemporary and multi-cultural folk music and dance and related performing arts. Coronado is the owner of Ginger Roots Agency, a boutique talent agency and resource center, where she represents Doug MacLeod, and Ronny Cox, among others.
