= Vince Vozzo =

Australian sculptor

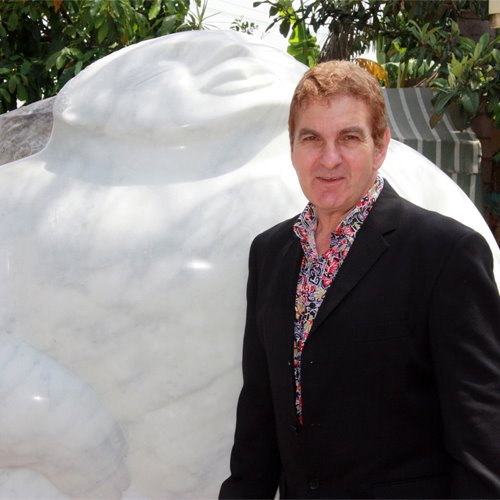
- Born: 1954 (age 71–72); Sydney, Australia
- Known for: Sculpture, Painting, Drawing

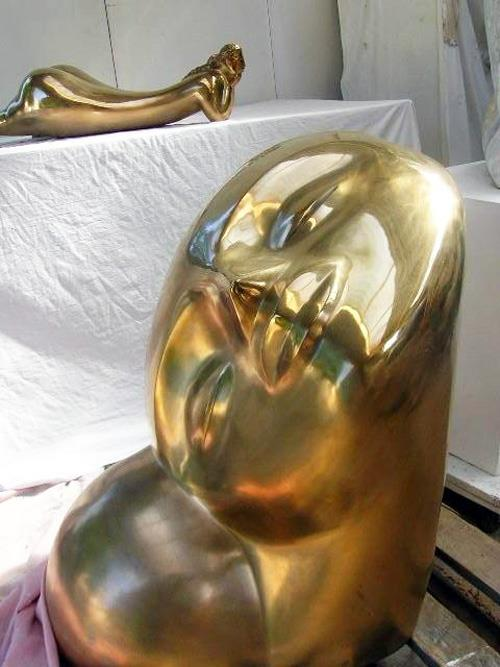
Vince Vozzo Bronze Sculptures

Vince Vozzo (born 1954, Sydney, Australia), is a multidisciplinary Australian artist known for his monumental stone & bronze sculptures. Vozzo works in a variety of media including sculpture, painting, and drawing. Vozzo has exhibited widely within Australia including Sculpture by the Sea, McClelland Sculpture Survey Award, Wynne Prize, & Blake Prize. He is well represented in numerous private and institutional collections in Australia, U.K., Europe, USA and Asia.

== Art ==
Vozzo’s artistic focus is on form and narrative. Humanism, collectivism, mysticism and cold hard realities are his domain. He also has something to say about the business of art, and bringing the opposites that exist in both his life, and his work, into harmony.

Art critic, John McDonald describes Vozzo as “a carver in a world of welders and installation artists, a humanist in a contemporary art scene dominated by nihilists".

Vince Vozzo is represented in private and Institutional collections in Australia, England, USA, and Asia including the Vizard Foundation, Melbourne and the collection of Mildura Regional Gallery. Vince has been a regular finalist in the Wynne Prize and is one of an exclusive number of artists in 'the decade club' who have shown with Sculpture by the Sea every year for the last 10 years. Vozzo has been a recipient of numerous coveted awards and residencies including the 1999 Hill-End Artist in Residence. In 2008 a survey exhibition "Vince Vozzo: Mule Head Testa Dura" was mounted at the Casula Power House.

== Life ==
Born to Italian parents in 1954, Vozzo is a second generation Italian-Australian and grew up in the sprawling western suburbs of Sydney. Vozzo’s path to artistic prominence began early in childhood, but it wasn't always easy. As a child, Vozzo suffered dyslexia and he withdrew from formal learning. He plunged himself into a world of comic strip animation, and these images gave him the impetus to draw.

In his teens, he was simultaneously doing work for disadvantaged kids, & gaining considerable recognition and fame for his Bondi sand sculptures. By now, he’d already successfully completed a hairdressing apprenticeship. He also considered work as a social worker but an artistic streak desperate for expression could not be ignored and he instead enrolled to study Visual Arts at the East Sydney Technical College where he had his epiphany and realized he had found his medium with a block of stone. “I developed an interest in the use of form very early on. I suppose I am continuing a long tradition in sculpture of the human form that began in Ancient Greece and reached a pinnacle during the Italian Renaissance.”
