= Tom Paxton =

American singer-songwriter (born 1937)

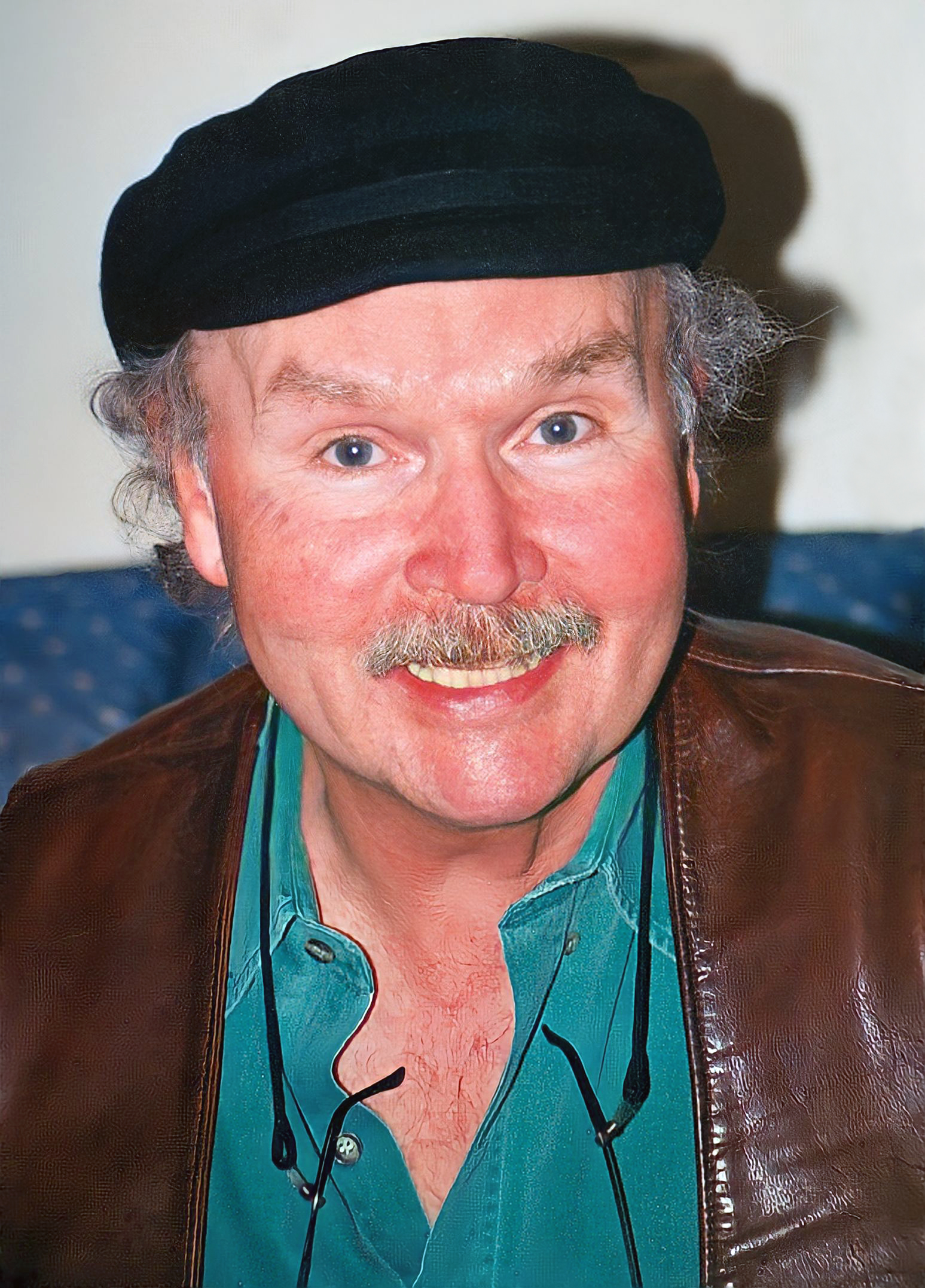
- Paxton in 2000 (Washington, D.C.)

Background information
- Born: Thomas Richard Paxton; October 31, 1937 (age 88); Chicago, Illinois, U.S.
- Genres: Folk
- Occupations: Singer-songwriter, guitarist
- Instruments: Guitar, vocals
- Years active: 1962–present
- Labels: Elektra; Vanguard; Rhino; Reprise; Flying Fish; Rounder; Mountain Railroad; Sugar Hill; Appleseed
- Website: tompaxton.com

Thomas Richard Paxton (born October 31, 1937) is an American folk singer-songwriter whose career spans more than sixty years. In 2009, Paxton received a Grammy Lifetime Achievement Award. He is a music educator as well as an advocate for folk singers to combine traditional songs with new compositions.

Paxton's songs have been widely recorded, including modern standards such as "The Last Thing on My Mind", "Bottle of Wine", "Whose Garden Was This", "The Marvelous Toy", and "Ramblin' Boy". Paxton's songs have been recorded by Pete Seeger, Bob Dylan, the Weavers, Judy Collins, Sandy Denny, Joan Baez, Doc Watson, Harry Belafonte, Peter, Paul and Mary, the Seekers, Marianne Faithfull, the Kingston Trio, the Chad Mitchell Trio, John Denver, Dolly Parton and Porter Wagoner, Johnny Cash, Willie Nelson, Flatt & Scruggs, the Move, the Fireballs, Francesco Guccini, and many others (see covers).

== Early life ==
Paxton was born on October 31, 1937, in Chicago, Illinois, to Burt and Esther Paxton. His father was "a chemist, mostly self-educated", and as his health began to fail him, the family moved to Wickenburg, Arizona, where the young Paxton began riding horses at the numerous dude ranches in the area and was also first introduced to folk music, discovering the music of Burl Ives and others.

In 1948, the family moved to Bristow, Oklahoma, which Paxton considers to be his hometown. Soon after, his father died from a stroke. Paxton was about 15 when he received his first stringed instrument, a ukulele. He was given a guitar by his aunt when he was sixteen, and he soon began to immerse himself in the music of Ives and Harry Belafonte.

In 1955, Paxton enrolled at the University of Oklahoma, where he studied in the drama school. It was here that he first found other enthusiasts of folk music and discovered the music of Woody Guthrie and the Weavers. He would later note, "Woody was fearless; he'd take on any issue that got him stirred up ... and he became one of my greatest influences." In college, he was in a group known as the Travellers, which sang in an off-campus coffeehouse.

== Career ==
=== Early career ===
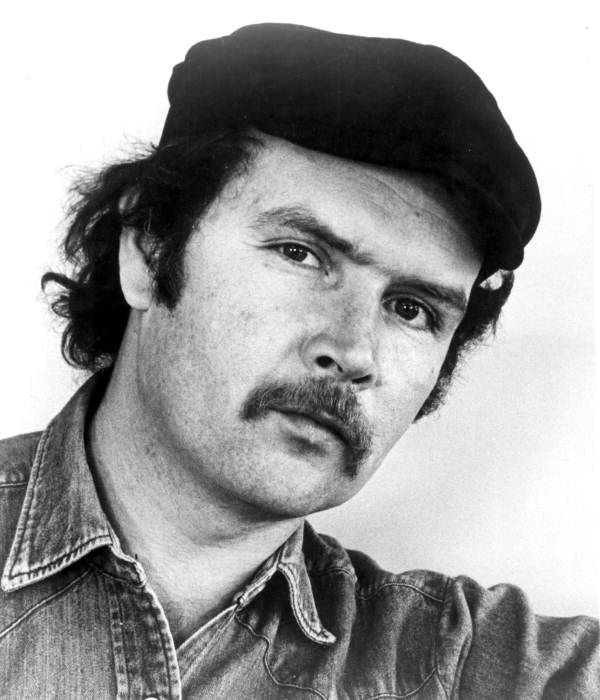
Paxton in 1976

Upon graduating in 1959 with a Bachelor of Fine Arts degree, Paxton acted in summer stock theatre and briefly tried graduate school before joining the Army. While attending the Clerk Typist School in Fort Dix, New Jersey, he began writing songs on his typewriter and spent almost every weekend visiting Greenwich Village in New York City during the emerging early 1960s folk revival.

Shortly after his honorable discharge from the Army, Paxton auditioned for the Chad Mitchell Trio via publisher Milt Okun in 1960. He initially received the part, but his voice did not blend well enough with those of the group members. However, after singing his song "The Marvelous Toy" for Okun, he became the first writer signed to Okun's music publishing company, Cherry Lane Music Publishing.

Paxton soon began performing at The Gaslight Cafe in Greenwich Village, where he became a mainstay. In 1962, he recorded a privately produced live album at the Gaslight entitled, I'm the Man That Built the Bridges. During his stay in Greenwich Village, Paxton published some of his songs in the folk magazines Broadside and Sing Out!, and performed alongside such folksingers as Bob Dylan, Phil Ochs, Eric Andersen, Dave Van Ronk, and Mississippi John Hurt. Paxton met his future wife, Margaret Ann Cummings (known as "Midge"), at the Gaslight one night in January 1963 after being introduced to her by David Blue.

Pete Seeger learned several of Paxton's songs in 1963, including "Ramblin' Boy" (which Seeger performed at The Weavers reunion concert at Carnegie Hall) and "What Did You Learn in School Today?" Paxton improved his profile as a performer, appearing at the 1963 Newport Folk Festival, which was recorded by Vanguard Records. A month after Newport in 1963, Paxton married Midge. He began traveling the country on the coffeehouse and small-venue circuit before returning to New York. Paxton became involved with causes that promoted human rights, civil rights, and labor rights. In 1963, Paxton and a group of other folk musicians performed and offered moral support to striking coal miners in Hazard, Kentucky.

After returning to New York in 1964, Paxton signed with Elektra Records, a label which at that time featured a distinguished roster of folk musicians. He would eventually record seven albums for Elektra. As the folk revival hit its peak, Paxton began getting more work outside of New York City, including benefit concerts and college campus dates. In 1964, he took part in the Freedom Summer and visited the Deep South, with other folk musicians, to perform at voter registration drives and civil rights rallies. He wrote a civil rights song "Beau John" after he attended a Freedom Song Workshop in Atlanta, Georgia and the song "Goodman, Schwerner and Chaney" about the murders of three civil rights activists (Andrew Goodman, Michael Schwerner, and James Chaney) in the summer of 1964 by members of the Ku Klux Klan near Philadelphia, Mississippi. Paxton's own compositions began to be increasingly recognized within folk music circles and in other genres.

Of the songwriters on the Greenwich Village scene of the 1960s, Dave Van Ronk said, "Dylan is usually cited as the founder of the new song movement, and he certainly became its most visible standard-bearer, but the person who started the whole thing was Tom Paxton ... he tested his songs in the crucible of live performance, he found that his own stuff was getting more attention than when he was singing traditional songs or stuff by other people ... he set himself a training regimen of deliberately writing one song every day. Dylan had not yet showed up when this was happening, and by the time Bobby came on the set, with at most two or three songs he had written, Tom was already singing at least 50 percent his own material. That said, it was Bobby's success that really got the ball rolling. Prior to that, the folk community was very much tied to traditional songs, so much so that songwriters would sometimes palm their own stuff off as traditional."

In 1965, Paxton made his first tour of the United Kingdom. The tour was the beginning of a still-thriving professional relationship that has included yearly performances there. He met Bruce Woodley, one of the founding members of the Australian folk group The Seekers, and they collaborated on the song "Angeline (Is Always Friday)", which The Seekers recorded and featured in their concerts, TV shows, and on a DVD. In 1967, the rock group Clear Light recorded a menacing and lengthy psychedelic version of Paxton's song "Mr. Blue" on their only album Clear Light. Porter Wagoner and Dolly Parton's recording of "The Last Thing on My Mind" reached the top ten on the U.S. country singles charts in December 1967. Then in 1968, Paxton scored a Top 10 radio hit when The Fireballs recorded his song "Bottle of Wine". In the 1960s, Paxton licensed one of his songs, "My Dog's Bigger than Your Dog", for use in a Ken-L Ration dog food commercial. Paxton continued writing and performing. He was not interested in jumping on the folk rock (or, as he once joked, "folk rot") bandwagon though and continued his folk singer-songwriter style on albums like Outward Bound (1966) and Morning Again (1968). On January 20, 1968, three months after the death of Woody Guthrie, Paxton and a number of other prominent folk musicians performed at the Harold Leventhal produced "A Tribute to Woody Guthrie" concert at New York City's Carnegie Hall.

Paxton decided to try some more elaborate recording techniques, including neo-chamber music with string sections, flutes, horns, piano, various session musicians, as well as his acoustic guitar and vocals, similar to what his labelmate Judy Collins and his friend Phil Ochs were experimenting with around this time. Paxton finally broke into the album pop charts himself with The Things I Notice Now in the summer of 1969 and also charted with Tom Paxton 6 in the spring of the following year. His song "Whose Garden Was This", an environmentalist anthem written for the first Earth Day, was later recorded by John Denver and became the title track of Denver's 1970 album. Another Paxton song Denver recorded was "Forest Lawn", in whose lyrics Paxton satirized the "theme park approach" to death that Forest Lawn Memorial Park in Glendale, California, has been accused of having taken.

The diverse "Baroque Folk" experimentation on Paxton's recordings was basically short-lived though, and he tended to think that the music was becoming too overproduced and away from the more natural acoustic roots that he loved best. Regarding this time, he said, "the acoustic guitar has always been what I loved the most ... I know I didn't have that rock mentality or anything. I was still a kid from a small town in Oklahoma. And I just wanted to hear folk songs." Paxton continued to sing and perform his songs on acoustic guitar at his live performances, and it was not too long before his albums would once again generally reflect his original traditional-sounding style.

=== Middle career ===
Paxton, his wife and their two daughters lived in Holland Park, London, for about four years in the early 1970s. After a stay in England due to professional success and love of the country, Paxton and Midge went on a tour of New Zealand and China and even appeared on a Chinese talk show. Paxton released How Come the Sun in 1971. The album gave him his highest chart ranking in the U.S. at number 120, though his next album, Peace Will Come (1972), barely even reached the charts. He soon returned to New York City and the Long Island town of East Hampton before moving to the Washington, D.C., area around 1977. After recording three albums for Reprise Records and a few for "an English label that didn't pan out well", Paxton signed with Vanguard Records, with whom he recorded a live album with Steve Goodman, New Songs From the Briarpatch (1977), which contained some of Paxton's topical songs of the 1970s, including "Talking Watergate" and "White Bones of Allende" as well as a song dedicated to Mississippi John Hurt entitled "Did You Hear John Hurt?" In 1978, Paxton released his album Heroes, which contained a song, "Phil", about his friend Phil Ochs, who had taken his own life in 1976. The album also includes the song "The Death of Stephen Biko", which details the murder of anti-apartheid activist Stephen Biko in South Africa. Paxton's 1979 album, Up and Up, contains the song "Let the Sunshine", which addresses issues concerning environmentalism and solar energy. Paxton has also performed at the Clearwater Festival, an annual event, started by Pete Seeger, dedicated to environmentalism and cleaning up the Hudson River. His 1983 album Bulletin includes a song about Woody Guthrie entitled "They Couldn't Take the Music".

After recording for labels such as Mountain Railroad and Flying Fish in the 1980s, Paxton started his own label, Pax Records, in 1987. It was during this time that Paxton continued to suffer from an undiagnosed and deepening depression that affected his work. With some advice from Midge, he began to look for a solution and was eventually diagnosed with attention deficit disorder, for which he received ongoing treatment.

=== Later career ===
In the 1990s, Paxton began delving deeply into children's music, recording nine children's albums during the decade. In July 1994, Paxton was invited to perform at a folk festival in Israel, "Jacob's Ladder", and he played there and a series of concerts around Israel accompanied by folk guitarist and harmonica player Shay Tochner. Paxton recorded a live album in 1996 with his good friend Jim Rooney, and it contained some new comical songs about current events. Eric Weissberg, John Gorka, Robin and Linda Williams, among others, also performed; and the album was titled Live: For the Record. In the mid-1990s, Paxton also began to give more workshops in songwriting.

In 2000, Paxton once again began to write more of the topical songs that had been prominent during his early career. In 2001, he released an album with Anne Hills entitled Under American Skies, and in 2002, he released an album of all new songs entitled Looking for the Moon (Appleseed Recordings). At the time of its release, Paxton was quoted saying that it might be his best album so far. Looking for the Moon contains the song "The Bravest", which is about the firefighters who gave their lives while trying to save others in New York City on September 11, 2001. Around this time, Paxton began writing and releasing his "Short Shelf Life Songs" about current events for free download on his website. Paxton wrote a number of topical protest songs that were critical of the Bush administration's actions. In 2007, he rewrote a song of his from 1965 entitled "Lyndon Johnson Told The Nation", about the escalation of the war in Vietnam, and transformed it into "George W. Told The Nation", about the surge in the Iraq war. In 2007, Tom Paxton became one of the founding members of the Copyright Alliance, whose purpose is to promote the cultural and economic benefits of copyrights.

In 2008, Paxton rewrote his song "I'm Changing My Name to Chrysler", about the federal loan guarantee to Chrysler in 1979, as "I Am Changing My Name to Fannie Mae", about the 700 billion dollar "bailout of the U.S. financial system". He continues to perform yearly tours of the United States and UK.

In March 2015, Paxton released the studio album Redemption Road. In January 2017, Paxton released Boat in the Water, his sixty-third album.

Paxton is now in "semi-retirement", though he still performs occasional shows and did a ten-venue UK tour in 2017.

Paxton toured the UK in 2018 and 2019 (11 venues), accompanied by The Don Juans. His shows featured his 2011 song "What if, no matter" ("He couldn't lay his hands on a gun").

Paxton has released several studio records in recent years, including Together in collaboration with John McCutcheon in 2023 and All New with Cathy Fink and Marcy Marxer. He has had a creative renaissance late in his career, co-writing multiple times a week with an array of artists including John McCutcheon, Jackson Emmer, and Buffalo Rose. Paxton and Buffalo Rose collaborated on a version of his song "I Give You the Morning" on their co-release Rabbit in 2022.

== Personal life and family ==
Paxton was married to Margaret "Midge" Anne Cummings from 1963 until her death from a long illness in 2014. The couple have two daughters, Jennifer and Kate, and three grandsons. Jennifer is a history professor who has published courses for The Teaching Company.

Over the years, the Paxtons traveled extensively as Midge supported her husband's performing career and they took part in civil rights and antiwar demonstrations. They lived for two years in London, where Midge frequently performed before they returned to East Hampton, New York, every summer and were part of a large network of friends who shared music interests, cookouts and holiday celebrations. After spending a few summers in Amagansett, the Paxtons finally moved to East Hampton in 1967, buying a house on Egypt Close the following year, where Midge said she was particularly proud of her work in the early women's rights movement.

Paxton has described his political views in the following way: "My own politics more or less resembled Will Rogers's politics. He had said that he belonged to no organized political party — he was a Democrat ... being young and impassioned almost automatically put me over on the radical side of most issues. Being older, I find myself still more or less there, somewhat to my surprise."

== Awards, honors, and nominations ==
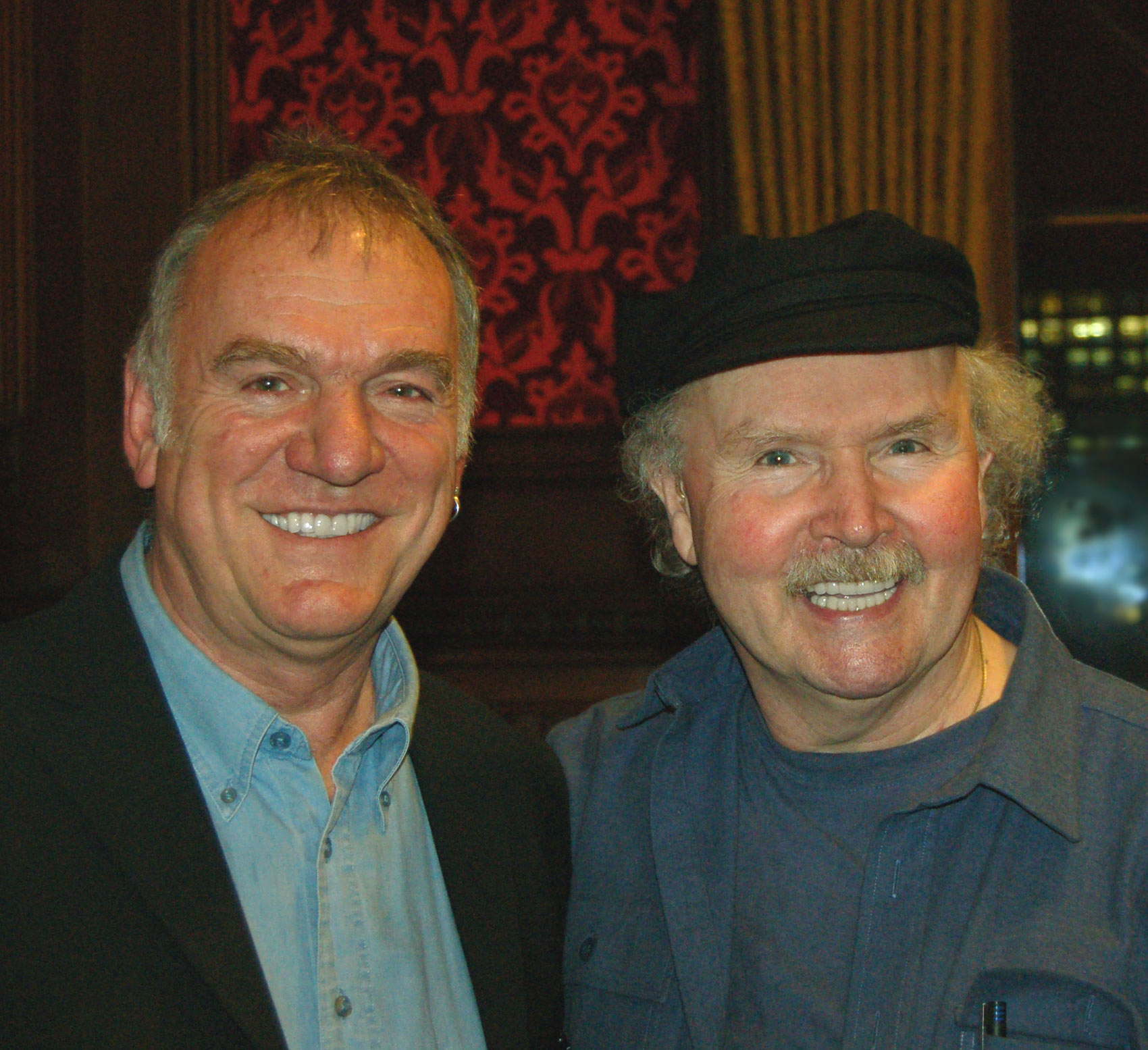
Tom Paxton with Ralph McTell (left) at the Palace of Westminster in 2007

In February 2002, Paxton was honored with the ASCAP Lifetime Achievement Award in Folk Music. A few days later, he received three Wammies (Washington, DC, Area Music Awards); as Best Male Vocalist in the "traditional folk" and "children's music" categories, and for Best Traditional Folk Recording of the Year for "Under American Skies" (2001).

Paxton has been nominated four times for Grammy Awards, all since 2002. He was first nominated in 2002 for his children's album, Your Shoes, My Shoes. The following year, Looking for the Moon received a 2003 nomination for "Best Contemporary Folk Album". Live in the UK (2005), received a 2006 Grammy nomination in the "Best Traditional Folk Album" category. Most recently, his 2008 album Comedians and Angels received a 2009 nomination, also in the "Best Traditional Folk Album" category. Paxton was honored with a 2009 Lifetime Achievement Award from the Recording Academy, and the formal announcement was made during the 51st Annual Grammy Awards telecast, which aired on February 8, 2009.

In 2004, the Martin Guitar Company introduced the HD-40LSH Tom Paxton Signature Edition acoustic guitar in his honor. In 2005, Paxton received a Lifetime Achievement Award for Songwriting at BBC Radio 2's Folk Awards at London's Brewery Arts Centre. In 2006, Paxton received a Lifetime Achievement Award from the North American Folk Music and Dance Alliance. On January 22, 2007, Paxton was honored with an official Parliamentary tribute at the House of Commons of the United Kingdom at the start of his 2007 UK tour. On May 3, 2008, Paxton was honored with a special lifetime tribute from the World Folk Music Association, and a concert was held at the Rachel M. Schlesinger Concert Hall and Arts Center at Northern Virginia Community College, Alexandria Campus, in Alexandria, Virginia.

== Writings ==
- 2000: The Honor of Your Company; by Tom Paxton New York, NY: Cherry Lane Music Company ISBN 1-57560-144-3
