= Jon Vezner =

American country music songwriter (born 1951)

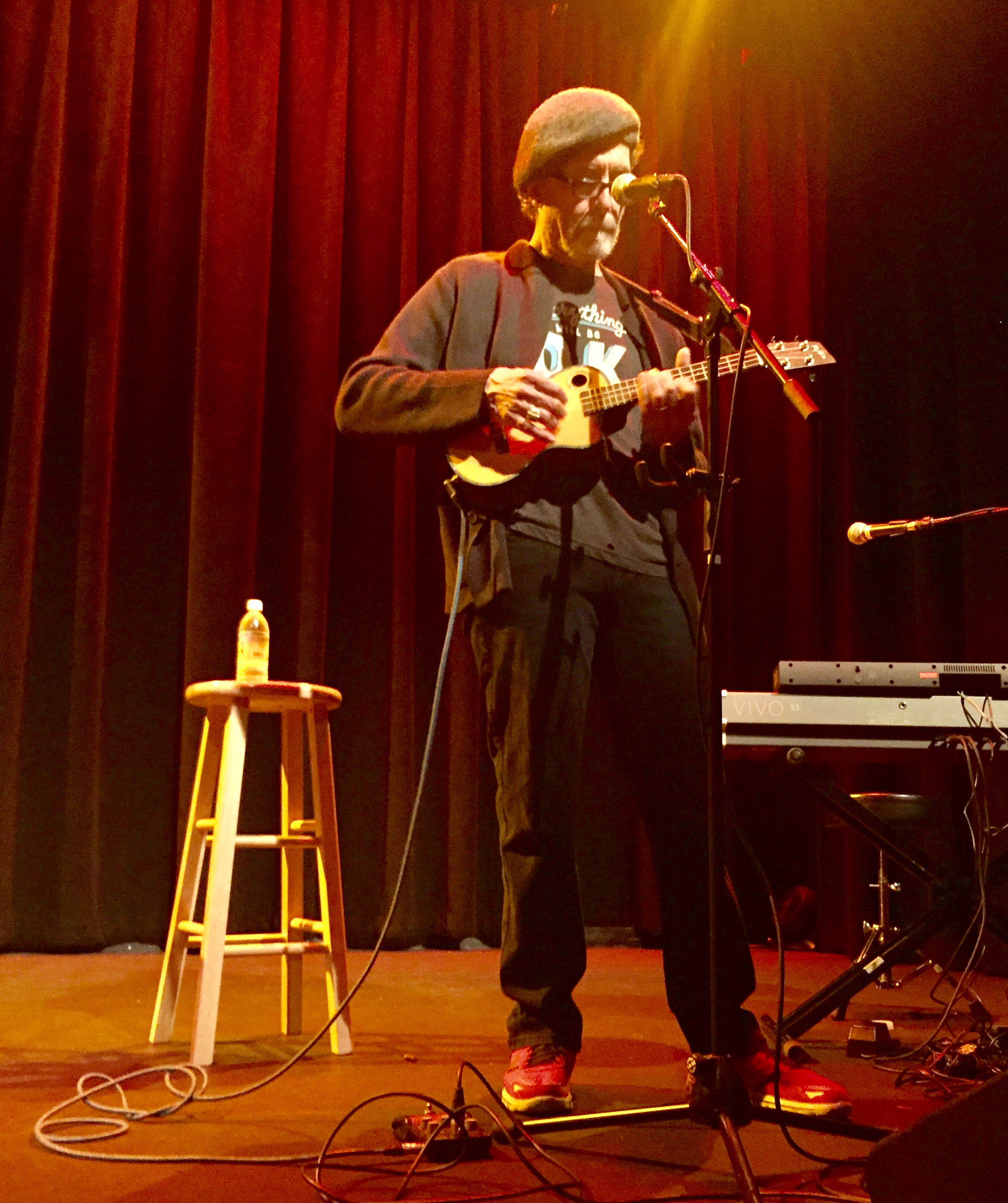
- Vezner performing in 2019.

Background information
- Born: June 6, 1951 (age 73); Minneapolis, Minnesota, U.S.
- Genres: Country
- Occupation: Songwriter
- Years active: 1988-present
- Member of: The Don Juans
- Spouse: Kathy Mattea (m. 1988)

Jon Vezner (born June 6, 1951) is an American country music songwriter. He is best known for his work with Kathy Mattea, to whom he has been married since 1988.

Vezner began working as a songwriter in Minnesota and later moved to Nashville, Tennessee. He set up a publishing company underneath the apartment in which Mattea lived, and befriended her after jump-starting her car. They began dating in 1986, and married on February 14, 1988.

Vezner wrote several of Mattea's songs, including "Where've You Been", "A Few Good Things Remain", "Time Passes By", and "Whole Lotta Holes". He also wrote "Then What?" for Clay Walker, "If I Didn't Love You" by Steve Wariner, and "You're Gone" by Diamond Rio.

He performs with Don Henry as The Don Juans; they accompanied Tom Paxton on his 2018 and 2019 UK tours.
