= Cathy Fink & Marcy Marxer =

American musical duo

Cathy Fink & Marcy Marxer are a musical duo, activists, educators, and a married couple. They perform folk, bluegrass and children's music and have performed with Pete Seeger, Theodore Bikel, Tom Paxton, Patsy Montana, Riders in the Sky and others. The Washington Area Music Association has recognized the duo with over 60 Wammie Awards for folk, bluegrass, and children's music.

Fink and Marxer earned Grammy Awards for their recordings cELLAbration: a Tribute to Ella Jenkins, and Bon Appétit!: Musical Food Fun. Their albums Postcards and Banjo Talkin' were Grammy Finalists in the Best Traditional Folk Album category.

Fink and Marxer currently live in Silver Spring, Maryland and Lansing, North Carolina.

== History ==
Cathy Fink was born in Maryland, but began her musical career in Canada in the early 1970s, busking and playing folk music in coffeehouses. A singer, guitarist, banjo player and yodeler, she made her recording debut in 1975 with Duck Donald, with whom she toured for five years and recorded three albums.

Marcy Marxer grew up in Swartz Creek, Michigan and learned to play guitar, mandolin, hammered dulcimer and button accordion while still in high school. She went to work for General Motors but continued to play at every opportunity. In 1978, after receiving theater training at the American Academy of Dramatic Arts and the Ringling Brothers Clown College, she devoted herself to music full-time.

The two met in 1980, in Toronto, Ontario, Canada, at the Mariposa Folk Festival. By 1983 they had begun writing songs together and appearing on each other's albums. Soon after, they began performing together, often in children's concerts. In 1989, they released a self-titled album, and a permanent partnership was formed.

== Awards ==
- Grammy 2003 Best Musical Album for Children- cELLAbration: a Tribute to Ella Jenkins
- Grammy 2004 Best Musical Album for Children - Bon Appétit!
- Finalist John Lennon Songwriting Contest Award - 2008 - JUBILATION
- John Lennon Songwriting Contest Grand Prize Winner, ISC Grand Prize Winner - 2005 SCAT LIKE THAT
- Dagnabbit– John Lennon Songwriting Contest Award
- Names - Mid Atlantic Songwriting Contest, Best Folk Song

== Discography ==
- WAHOO! Community Music, Inc. 2019
- Shout & Shine (Fink, Marxer, Gleaves), Community Music, Inc. 2018
- Zoom a Little Zoom: A Ride Through Science, Community Music, Inc. 2018
- Get Up and Do Right, Community Music, Inc. 2017
- Cantale a tu Bebe, Community Music, Inc. 2017
- Dancin' in the Kitchen: Songs for All Families, Community Music, Inc. 2015
- Things Are Comin' My Way (Marcy Marxer), Community Music, Inc. 2012
- Nobody Else Like Me, A&M, 1994, Community Music, Inc. 2012
- Help Yourself, A&M, 1993, Community Music, Inc. 2012
- Rockin' the Uke, Community Music, Inc. 2011
- Sing to Your Baby – Sing Plays and Love Songs for New Families, Community Music, 2011 Peter E. Randall Publishing, 2012
- The Great American Folksong w/ Children's Chorus of Washington, SonoLuminus, 2011
- Triple Play EP, Community Music, 2010
- Banjo to Beatbox EP with Special Guest Christyles Bacon, Community Music, 2009
- Old Time Banjo Festival, Rounder, 2007
- Banjo Talkin’, Rounder, 2007
- Scat Like That: A Musical Word Odyssey, Rounder, 2005
- cELLAbration: A Tribute to Ella Jenkins, Smithsonian Folkways, 2004
- Bon Appetit! Musical Food Fun, Rounder, 2003
- Pocket Full of Stardust, Rounder, 2002
- Postcards, Community Music, 2002
- All Wound Up / Cathy & Marcy & Brave Combo, Rounder, 2001
- Pillow Full of Wishes, Rounder, 2000
- Changing Channels, Rounder, 1998
- Voice on the Wind, Rounder, 1997
- Blanket Full of Dreams, Rounder, 1996
- A Parent's Home Companion, Rounder, 1995
- A Cathy & Marcy Collection for Kids, Rounder, 1994
- Air Guitar, High Windy, 1994, Community Music, 2010
- Banjo Haiku, Community Music, 1992
- The Runaway Bunny/Goodnight Moon, HarperCollins, 1989
- Cathy Fink & Marcy Marxer, Sugar Hill Records, 1989
- Blue Rose, Sugar Hill Records, 1988
- When the Rain Comes Down, Rounder, 1987
- Jump Children, Rounder, 1986
- The Leading Role, Rounder Records, 1985
- Grandma Slid Down the Mountain, Rounder, 1984
- Doggone My Time, Rooster Records, 1983, Community Music, 1999
