= Folk Alliance International =

American non-profit folk music organization

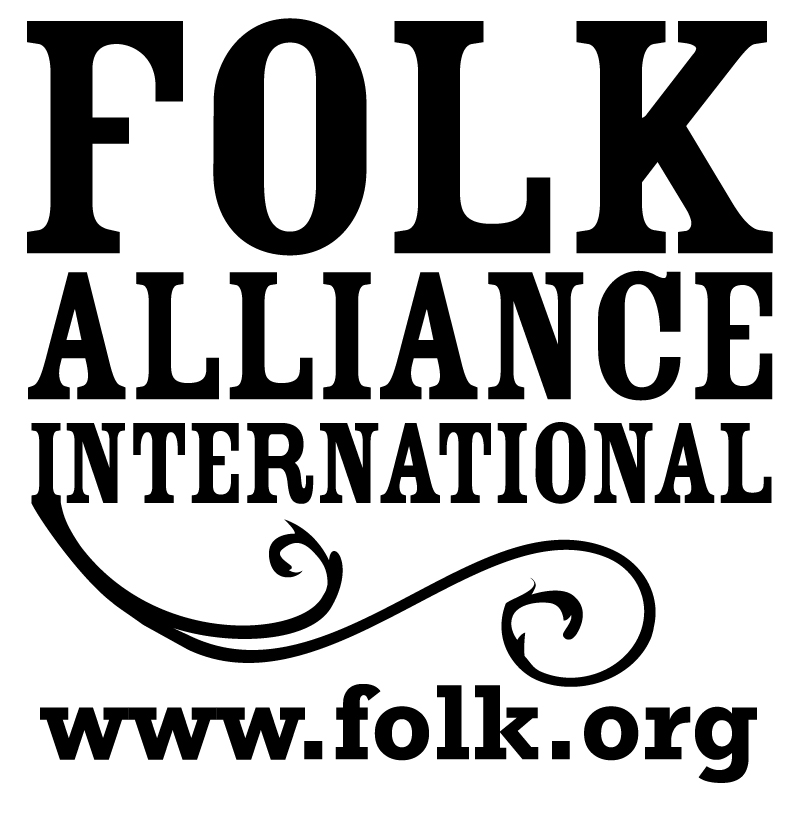
- Abbreviation: FAI
- Formation: 1989
- Type: non-profit music organization
- Purpose: folk music advocacy, education and performance
- Headquarters: Kansas City, Missouri
- Executive Director: Jennifer Roe
- Budget: $1,000,000
- Staff: 7
- Website: folk.org

Folk Alliance International (previously the North American Folk Music and Dance Alliance) is a non-profit organization that produces an annual conference that is the world's largest gathering of the folk music industry and community. Founded in 1989, FAI is an advocacy, professional development and networking organization, and is one of the five largest music conferences in North America. As of 2016, FAI has a membership of approximately 3,000, and a budget of US$1,000,000.

Members include record companies, publishers, presenters, agents, managers, music support services, manufacturers and artists that work in the folk music industry.

Jennifer Roe is the current executive director, who was appointed to the role in April 2024. FAI currently has 7 full-time staff members, and 8 contract staff members who work for the organization from various international locations.

== Folk Alliance International ==
Folk Alliance International (FAI) is now the official name of the former North American Folk Music & Dance Alliance. Their headquarters are currently in Kansas City, Missouri. The conference has been in Kansas City since 2014 and will remain there through 2018.

Folk Alliance International has five regional affiliates that provide conferences in their respective markets: Southwest Regional Folk Alliance (SWRFA), Folk Alliance Region Midwest (FARM), Southeast Regional Folk Alliance (SERFA), Folk Alliance Region West (FAR-West), and Northeast Regional Folk Alliance (NERFA). FAI defines 'folk' as "anything rooted in tradition, indigenous to one's culture. The organization consists of a large variety of songwriters, storytellers, bluegrass, blues, soul, old-time, traditional, global roots and world music, spoken word, Celtic, cajun," etc.

In addition to the conference, FAI provides a range of member benefits, including a non-profit group exemption program for U.S.-based organizations, an FAI/PRO House Concert Agreement Program, and Visa Writing Services. They also offer to their membership special discounts with various companies covering insurance, publications, travel, and manufacturers.

== Annual conference ==
The annual conference is an event that draws together music industry professionals from throughout the world to share ideas, network, and showcase emerging, mid-career, and legendary artists. Held over five days, the conference includes a keynote speaker, awards shows, over 2,400 registered attendees from 18 countries, 75 exhibitors, 150 panels & workshops, 200 juried official showcases, and over 2,800 private showcases held late at night. The conference is always held at a local hotel, and while in Kansas City has been at The Westin Kansas City at Crown Center.

Each conference typically has a theme. The 2017 theme was Forbidden Folk, and was meant to "celebrate activism in art and look at the ways folk music has, in the past and currently, played a role in labor movements, the civil movements, environmental movements, pacifist movements and political movements as the voice of the people".

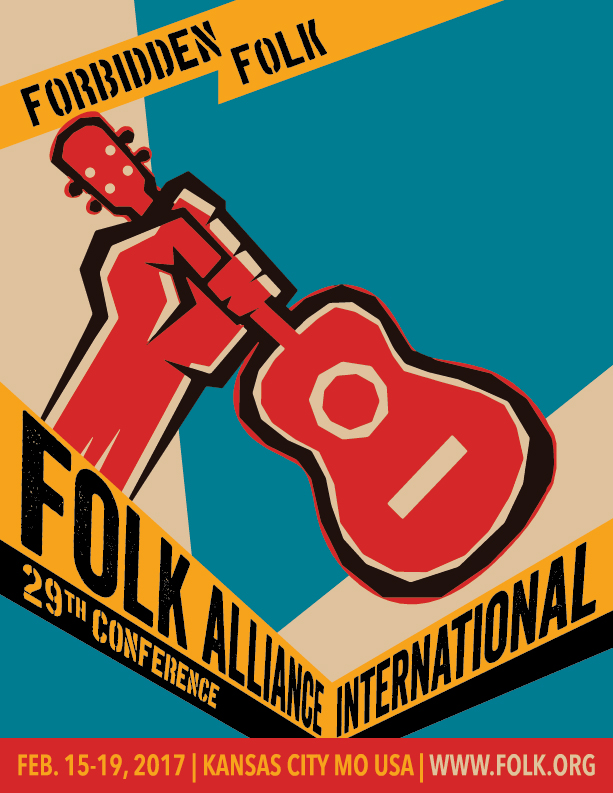
2017 Conference Artwork

== List of conferences ==
List of past and future conferences(as available).

| Year | City | Venue |
|---|---|---|
| 1989 | Malibu, California | Camp Hess Kramer |
| 1990 | Philadelphia, Pennsylvania | Howard Johnson North |
| 1991 | Chicago, Illinois | Holiday Inn, O'Hare |
| 1992 | Calgary, Alberta | Marlborough Inn |
| 1993 | Tucson, Arizona | Ramada, Downtown |
| 1994 | Boston, Massachusetts | 57 Park Plaza |
| 1995 | Portland, Oregon | Red Lion, Lloyd Center |
| 1996 | Washington, D.C. | Renaissance Hotel |
| 1997 | Toronto | Westin Harbour, Castle Hotel |
| 1998 | Memphis, Tennessee | Cook Convention Center/Crowne Plaza |
| 1999 | Albuquerque, New Mexico | Albuquerque Convention Center/Hyatt |
| 2000 | Cleveland, Ohio | Cleveland Convention Center/Sheraton |
| 2001 | Vancouver, British Columbia | Hyatt Regency, Vancouver |
| 2002 | Jacksonville, Florida | Adam's Mark Jacksonville |
| 2003 | Nashville, Tennessee | Renaissance Hotel |
| 2004 | San Diego, California | Town & Country Resort |
| 2005 | Montreal, Quebec | Hyatt Regency Hotel |
| 2006 | Austin, Texas | Hilton Hotel |
| 2007–2012 | Memphis, Tennessee | Memphis Marriott Hotel |
| 2013 | Toronto | Delta Chelsea Hotel |
| 2014–2018 | Kansas City, Missouri | Westin Crown Center Hotel |
| 2019 | Montreal, Quebec | Queen Elizabeth Hotel |
| 2020 | New Orleans, Louisiana | Sheraton New Orleans Hotel |
| 2021 | Not held due to COVID-19 | |
| 2022 | Kansas City, Missouri | Westin Crown Center Hotel |
| 2023 | Kansas City, Missouri | Westin Crown Center Hotel |
| 2024 | Kansas City, Missouri | Westin Crown Center Hotel |

== Conference themes ==
| Year | Theme |
|---|---|
| 1989–1993 | none |
| 1994 | Enriching the Folk Community Through Multicultural Diversity |
| 1995 | Building Community |
| 1996 | Expanding Alliances—A Capital Idea |
| 1997 | Window on Our World |
| 1998 | Rich at the Roots |
| 1999 | Under One Sky |
| 2000 | Spanning the Centuries |
| 2001 | Tuned to the World |
| 2002 | Southern Exposure |
| 2003 | none |
| 2004 | One Strong Voice |
| 2005 | none |
| 2006 | For the Sake of the Song |
| 2007–2014 | none |
| 2015 | Planet Folk |
| 2016 | Cultural Crossroads |
| 2017 | Forbidden Folk |
| 2018 | 30 Years of Community and Song |
| 2019 | The Spirit of Creativity |
| 2020 | The Story of People and Place |
| 2022 | Living Traditions |
| 2023 | Facing the Future: Sustainability in Folk Music. |
| 2024 | Alchemy: A Transformative Force |
