= Public folklore =

Public folklore is the term for the work done by folklorists in public settings in the United States and Canada outside of universities and colleges, such as arts councils, museums, folklife festivals, radio stations, etc., as opposed to academic folklore, which is done within universities and colleges. The term is short for "public sector folklore" and was first used by members of the American Folklore Society in the early 1970s.

== Scope of work ==
Public folklorists are engaged with the documentation, preservation, and presentation of traditional forms of folk arts, craft, folk music, and other genres of traditional folklife. In later years, public folklorists have also become involved in economic and community development projects. Public folklorists also work in "folk arts in the schools" programs, presenting master traditional artists to primary and secondary schools in demonstrations and residencies. They develop apprenticeship programs to foster the teaching of traditional arts by recognized masters. They also present traditional music on radio programs such as American Routes on Public Radio International. Occasionally they produce documentary films on aspects of traditional arts; Smithsonian folklorist Marjorie Hunt won an Academy Award for her 1984 short documentary film The Stone Carvers about the carvers at the National Cathedral in Washington, D.C. Public folklore graduate students at Memorial University have worked on a variety of community projects including seniors and traditional games, a museum exhibit based on a local neighbourhood, a festival of historic boat engines, lunch baskets used by paper mill workers, and rugelach making.

== Public folklore in the United States of America ==
In the US, Archie Green is generally credited as the founder of the public folklore movement, although his work builds on that of Ben Botkin and Alan Lomax, going back as far as the 1930s. (They called their work "applied folklore," a related but distinct paradigm.) Public folklore in the US can be traced back to the creation of the American Folklife Center at the Library of Congress in 1970, by an act of Congress, sponsored by Sen. Ralph Yarborough (D-TX) and written by Green and then-Senate aide Jim Hightower. Other national programs were later established at the Smithsonian Institution and the National Endowment for the Arts (NEA), where prominent folklorists such as Ralph Rinzler, Alan Jabbour, and Bess Lomax Hawes worked.

Funding programs were established in the 1970s and 1980s in over 40 state arts councils, and these facilitated the eventual creation or funding of major non-profit centres for folklife documentation and presentation, such as City Lore and the Center for Traditional Music and Dance in New York, Texas Folklife Resources, Northwest Folklife, the Western Folklife Center, and the Philadelphia Folklore Project.

The Smithsonian Institution features the Smithsonian Folklife Festival every June and July which attracts upwards of two million people to hear live performances and view demonstrations of traditional crafts.

Each year, some 15 outstanding American folk artists and performers are awarded National Heritage Fellowships from the NEA for their lifetime achievement. Some more widely known awardees over the years have included John Lee Hooker, B.B. King, Clifton Chenier, Earl Scruggs, Michael Flatley, Shirley Caesar, Albertina Walker, Janette Carter, Koko Taylor, Brownie McGhee, Sonny Terry, Jean Ritchie, Sunnyland Slim, Lydia Mendoza, Boozoo Chavis, Zakir Hussain, Helen Cordero, Margaret Tafoya, Santiago Jiménez, Jr., John Cephas, Bois Sec Ardoin, Mick Moloney, Clarence Fountain & the Blind Boys, Esther Martinez, and the Dixie Hummingbirds.

== Public folklore in Canada ==
The evolution of public folklore in Canada has followed a different course than in the United States, with folklore scholarship stimulated more by local social, political, and economic factors than by international trends in scholarship. This can be seen as part of a "distinctively Canadian" approach to folkloristics.

One early attempt to bring folklore scholarship into the public sphere was the establishment of the short-lived Canadian Folk-Lore Society in Toronto in 1908 under the leadership of David Boyle, archaeologist and director of the Ontario Museum, and there have been strong links between museology and public folklore in Canada ever since. Other early attempts included the development of the Alberta Folk-Lore and Local History Project in 1944–45, and the establishment of the Canadian Folk Music Society in 1957, under the leadership of Marius Barbeau, who has been described as Canada's first public sector folklorist. In the 1950s, Barbara Cass-Beggs collected folk music, published Eight Songs of Saskatchewan, and played an instrumental role in the formation of the Saskatchewan History & Folklore Society, also in 1957.

Following the 1968 establishment of the Memorial University of Newfoundland's Department of Folklore by Herbert Halpert, and the creation of MUNFLA by Halpert and Violetta Halpert, graduate programs in folklore studies at Memorial included occasional courses on applied folklore designed and taught by folklorist Neil Rosenberg prior to his retirement in 2004. Graduate Sheldon Posen became Curator of Canadian Folklife at the Canadian Museum of Civilization, curating exhibits such as the virtual exhibition Canada in a Box: Cigar Containers that Store Our Past 1883-1935 and an exhibit on Canadian hockey player "Rocket" Richard; graduate Michael Taft went on to develop public folklore projects such as Discovering Saskatchewan Folklore; graduate Richard MacKinnon, who held the position as Canada Research Chair in Intangible Cultural Heritage, has worked on numerous public folklore projects. As of 2020, Memorial's Department of Folklore remains the country's only comprehensive Anglophone folklore program.

In 1976, under the direction of historian Jean Hamelin, Laval University created the Centre d'Etudes sur la Langue, les Arts et les Traditions Populaires des Francophones d'Amerique du Nord (CELAT) which produced a large number of ethnology graduates who went on to work in the domains of archaeology, conservation, and historical research, or with numerous research institutes, museums, interpretation centres and various provincial and federal government departments.

Outside of Quebec, and notwithstanding the work of organizations such as the Canadian Museum of Civilization and individual folklorists, the fields of applied and public sector folklore grew slowly. In 2002, it was argued,

"...the lack of an adequately funded Canadian folklore centre in the 20th century has stunted the development of public folklore in Canada. The Folklore Studies Association of Canada and its predecessor, the Canadian Centre for Folk Culture Studies, both government-funded bodies, have been influenced by government cultural policies. With the creation of a strong multicultural policy, there has been a continued focus on the preservation of old-world cultural traditions, and a corresponding neglect of current folkloristics."

Still, Canadian graduates continued to advance public sector folklore within and outside the academy. The same year, it was noted "many Laval [folklore] graduate students find employment in the public sector." Leading up to and following the creation of UNESCO's 2003 Convention for the Safeguarding of the Intangible Cultural Heritage, Canadian folklorists including Gerald Pocius at Memorial and Laurier Turgeon at Laval were instrumental in advancing public folklore projects in Quebec and Newfoundland and Labrador as part of safeguarding measures for intangible cultural heritage, though Canada has not ratified the convention as of 2020. An intangible cultural heritage office was established at the Heritage Foundation of Newfoundland and Labrador in 2008, run on public folklore principles:

Newfoundland and Labrador considers the work of safeguarding intangible cultural heritage “public sector folklore.” As such, the province has adopted a strategy for safeguarding that is aligned with the UNESCO ICH Convention, but remains unique to Newfoundland and Labrador.

Public folklorist Dale Gilbert Jarvis was hired to run the program, holding the first provincial folklorist position in Canada. Under his direction, the program won the inaugural Jeonju International Award for Promoting ICH in 2019.

In 2007, Memorial University hired Jillian Gould, a folklorist with a background in public sector folklore, and starting in 2010 Memorial began a M.A. with Public and Applied Folklore Co-operative Education route for students wishing to specialize in public folklore. Graduates of the program have gone on to work with a variety of organizations including Heritage Foundation of Newfoundland and Labrador, MUNFLA, City of St. John's, Wooden Boat Museum of NL, Them Days Archive, the Mummers Festival, Folk Arts Society of NL, The Town of Deer Lake, and The Rooms.

Other jurisdictions have followed the public folklore work of Quebec and Newfoundland and Labrador. Heritage Saskatchewan hired Memorial University folklore graduate Kristin Catherwood in a role inspired by and mirroring Newfoundland and Labrador's intangible cultural heritage position. She has engaged in various public folklore projects, including work on communities in periods of economic transition, Prairie barns, and farm life during COVID-19.
