= Archive of Folk Culture =

First national collection of American folk music in the United States

The Archive of Folk Culture (originally named The Archive of American Folk Song) was established in 1928 as the first national collection of American folk music in the United States of America. It was initially part of the Music Division of the Library of Congress and now resides in the American Folklife Center.

== History ==
=== The Archive of American Folk Song 1928–1946 ===
The Music Division's director Carl Engel announced in April 1928 that the Library of Congress would appoint the folk song collector Robert Winslow Gordon as the archive's first director and explained the archive's scope as “a national collection of folk song … to ensure their preservation and to recognize the value of the folk heritage.” In the Library of Congress’ annual report for 1928 Engel argued the country's diverse contributors to its folk music made it richer than any other country's and he believed the scattered, unrecorded folk heritage was threatened by popular music and technological advances such as the radio and phonograph. In 1926 Gordon approached Engel and proposed a folk music collecting project that would allow Gordon to continue the collecting and research he began in San Francisco and Oakland, California in the early 1900s. Working with Librarian of Congress Herbert Putnam, Engel raised private funds to support the first post of Chair of American Folk Music. From its very beginning, the Archive was not a passive receptacle. Rather Gordon, with Engel's blessing, went into communities, actively solicited and collected folk music and brought them to the Archive.

Gordon spent his first year in the post in Darien, Georgia collecting materials such as song sheets and reels for the archive. Although Engel, Putnam and Gordon agreed that folk music was an important addition to the Library's music collections, they did not agree on the methods. Gordon expected autonomy as an independent researcher but his absence from the Library of Congress did not meet Engel or Putman's expectations. Engel and Putman frequently wrote to Gordon enquiring about his location and requesting updates about collecting activities and in order to improve relations with the Library's management, Gordon relocated to Washington, D.C. in 1929. He used his time in Washington, D.C. to experiment with phonographs and recording formats like wax cylinders and after borrowing an Amplifon disc recorder, he re-entered the field in 1932 and travelled around Virginia, West Virginia and Kentucky. However, the Great Depression decimated the country's economy and private donations that fund the post ran out in 1932 and Gordon left the Library of Congress.

Shortly after Gordon's departure, John Avery Lomax visited the Archive to consult its collections for American Ballads and Folk Songs, an extensive folk music anthology he co-authored with his son Alan Lomax and was financed by the Macmillan publishing company. Lomax had a project and backing but he needed recording equipment to capture folk music during his fieldwork. He made a deal with Engel; in exchange for borrowing a phonograph from the Library of Congress and providing recording blanks Lomax would deposit his materials into the Archive of American Folk Song. After finishing his anthology, Lomax received a grant in 1933 from the American Council of Learned Societies and undertook his first recording trip under the Library's auspices to collect new material to expand the Archive's collections. In 1934 Lomax was appointed the Honorary Consultant and Curator of the Archive of American Folk Song and with help from his wife Ruby Terrill Lomax, daughter Shirley Lomax, son John Jr. Lomax and son Alan Lomax, he travelled all over the United States but they extensively toured Southern states including Texas, Louisiana, Arkansas, Mississippi, Alabama, Florida, South Carolina, Georgia and Virginia and notably recorded performances by Huddie "Lead Belly" Ledbetter while the musician was incarcerated in a Louisiana state penitentiary. Lomax's understanding of folk culture was such that he viewed artefacts as survivors of times past. They were items that needed to be collected and protected before modern society could damage or erase them. He also believed that artefacts obtained from remote locations were purer, untainted and thus genuine expression of that culture. Although Lomax Sr. worked with the Library of Congress for over a decade and kept the title of Honorary Curator until his death, he was never an employee and was expected to support himself and his work through grants and payment for lecturing.

In 1936 Alan Lomax became the Archive's first official employee. He was given the title of Assistant in Charge and paid an annual salary of $620. Throughout his term, Alan toured the United States as well as Haiti and The Bahamas to record music and interviews and to take photographs. Making use of the Library of Congress' Coolidge Auditorium in 1938, Lomax Jr recorded the biography of jazz pianist, bandleader and composer Jelly Roll Morton. His collecting activities often enlisted the help of other folk musicians, collectors and enthusiasts including Woody Guthrie with whom he wrote and co-hosted American Folk Songs, a 26-week survey included as part of The American School of the Air radio series broadcast in 1939 by the American network CBS. In 1940 Alan, Librarian of Congress Archibald MacLeish and Music Division Chief Harold Spivacke secured a grant from the Carnegie Corporation of New York to install a Recording Laboratory within the Music Division. Describing the Recording Laboratory's purpose, MacLeish said it would "disseminate copies of the field recordings of the Archive of American Folk Song" and make some of the Archive's recordings available to the nation. The Recording Laboratory began producing recordings in 1941 and they included editorial contributions by Alan Lomax, Benjamin A. Botkin, Duncan Emrich, Frances Densmore, Willard Rhodes, Archie Green, and Charles Seeger. These recordings were commercially released and included notable series Folk Music of the United States and Folk Music of America. Alan also enabled local folk researchers by setting up an exchange whereby the Library of Congress would lend them equipment and they would deposit their recordings in the Archive. This mutually beneficial arrangement allowed collectors such as Vance Randolph, Charles Lafayette Todd, Robert Sonkin, Eloise Hubbard Linscott, Zora Neale Hurston, Herbert Halpert, Helen Creighton, William N. Fenton, Melville Herskovits, Helen Hartness Flanders and others to undertake projects while enriching the Archive's collection. While the Archive of Folk Song started out as a repository for American folk music, Alan helped expand its scope to include not only material from outside the United States but also folklore, verbal arts and oral histories.

Benjamin A. Botkin replaced Alan Lomax as Head of the Archive in 1942 but he was already working since 1939 in association with the Library of Congress as an editor with the Works Progress Administration Federal Writers' Project. Botkin's experience with the FWP as well as his academic accomplishments as a teacher at University of Oklahoma helped shape his perspective on folklore and guided his three-year term as Head at the Archive. Botkin not only championed oral histories' contributions to folk culture but he also helped shift their values from object to function. Alan Lomax certainly collected oral histories as part of his fieldwork and they were thus not new additions to the Archive's collections. However, Botkin's perspective on their contributions to folk culture was different. On the one hand, Lomax viewed oral histories as a natural by-product of the narrative work he and his colleagues carried out as part of the WPA projects. Their functions beyond those projects were never considered. On the other hand, Botkin took on what was dubbed a functionalist perspective that examined folk culture from the bottom-up rather than through academic, literary hierarchies of previous Heads like Gordon and Lomax Sr. He also developed and advocated a concept he called folk-say, which acts as a more general and more inclusive term than folklore. Folk-say included oral, written, so-called real and so-called imagined stories as well as captured the idea that folklore was an evolving form of culture and not a static relic. His perspective on folk culture reflected the shifting attitudes felt by the Library of Congress and the public in the lead up to WW2.

=== Folklore Section 1946–1976 ===
In October 1945 Duncan Emrich, who had worked as the Military Historian in then General Dwight D. Eisenhower's administration, replaced Botkin. When Luther Evans, who took up his position as the 10th Librarian of Congress only four months prior to Emrich, asked all department heads to undertake collection surveys and submit reports, Emrich produced one that was arguably more timely, more accurate and offered more astute recommendations than any previous Archive Head before him. This accomplishment was partly due to Emrich's military meticulousness and inspired by a grand, international vision for the Library of Congress and The Archive, one that reflected the United States' new position in the world post-WW2, and was shared by Evans. As well as his report to Evans, Emrich produced several more memorandums about strategies for the Archive and he boldly suggested a further 5 additions to the Folk Music of the Americas Series and even suggested that 3 of those albums could be made available by February 1946, only two months from their proposal. However, at that point, Emrich and Rae Korson were the Archive's only permanent staff and thus responsible for all its activities including answering reference requests. Within Emrich's first six months as Head of the Archive, he proposed many programs and projects that were both substantial and ambitious: an expanded staff that included a musicologist, domestic field projects that would increase the Archive's collections to cover 12 states not previously surveyed, foreign field recording projects. On 22 August 1946 Evans created the Folklore Section, which absorbed the Archive of American Folk Song, within the Music Division and this name change reflected the Archive's transitioning place within the Library of Congress, its scope and its activities. Emrich worked tirelessly with special interest societies, organisations and higher education institutions to expand the Folklore Section's relationships but by 1950 neither he nor Korson had managed to secure budgets for more staff or acquisitions. From 1950 Emrich refocused the Archive's gaze to make the most of the materials already collected by the Archive.

It is possible to say, in 1950, that the pioneering phase of field collecting and the establishment of Archives has come to a close and that in the future emphasis should be directed to coordinated efforts, to elimination of duplication, and to strong encouragement for scholars and others to use -- in fairly exhaustive studies -- the materials already gathered.

By 1952 Emrich was frustrated by the shortage of staff and the number of requests from folklore collectors to use the recording equipment he had to turn down due to improper funding.

== Collections ==
The Archive of Folk Culture encompasses 2,700 collections that contains 150,000 sound recordings and over 3 million items. Some of those collections have been digitised and are now available through the America Folklife Center's online projects and presentations but most remain only accessible by visiting the Folklife Reading Room in person. Two notable collections held by the Archive are the Lomax Family Collection and the Alan Lomax Collection. The former consists of materials collected and generated by the entire Lomax family including John, Alan and others. The latter specifically covers the activities of Alan Lomax. The Alan Lomax collection was acquired by the Library of Congress in March 2004 through an agreement between the Library, the Association for Cultural Equity and an anonymous donor. Other collections in the Archive of Folk Culture include: California Gold: Northern California Folk Music from the Thirties; the Montana Folklife Survey Collection; Voices from the Days of Slavery: Former Slaves Tell Their Stories; as well as Woody Guthrie and the Archive of American Folk Song, Correspondence 1940–1950.

== The American Folklife Preservation Act (Public Law 94-201) ==
The American Folklife Preservation Act or Public Law 94-201 is the American legislative statute that created the American Folklife Center within the Library of Congress and determined its purpose, organisation and obligations to the American people. With the creation of the American Folklife Center, The Archive of Folk Song, formally part of the Music Division, had its custodianship transferred to the American Folklife Center and its name changed to the Archive of Folk Culture.

=== S. 1591 ===
It was first introduced as to the Senate as bill S. 1591 on 20 March 1969 by Senator Ralph Yarborough, a Democrat from Texas. When Yarborough introduced the bill, he acknowledged the country's varied cultural heritages and explained that American folk culture is the product of the "many people, many institutions, many lands and customs [that] have combined to make up the distinctive character," a layering Yarborough likened not to the "refinement of taste, but [to] the total way of life of a people." His notion of folk culture was broad, inclusive and representative of the many communities and cultures contained in the United States. Yet Yarborough explained it was under threat and needed federal support for survival because it is transmitted "orally or by imitation from one generation to another, often without benefit of formal instruction or of written sources." Action was required in order to stem or stop the so-called damaging effects of technology and popular culture. Alan Lomax even supported Yarborough's view on popular influences and spoke to the Senate in order to bolster the case. The bill proposed the Smithsonian Institution was the best home for the Archive and its future activities because it had hosted the Festival of American Folklife but although the Smithsonian was in favour of the general premise of the bill, it did not want to take on the responsibility. Despite its support in the Senate, bill S. 1591 did not pass in the House and was removed from consideration.

=== H.R. 17382 ===
On 15 October 1974 Representative Lucien Nedzi introduced a comparable bill - H.R. 17382 - to the House. This time, the bill, known as the American Folklife Preservation Act, proposed an American Folklife Center at the Library of Congress that would be supervised by a board of trustees and be "authorized to enter into contracts, make grants and loans, and award scholarships to individuals and groups for activities including research, scholarship, training, exhibitions, performances and workshops." Nedzi, speaking 5 years after the first bill was introduced, used a similar justification for the center's necessity. He again raised the fragility of folk traditions in the face of mass media, cultural assets turned "victims of the pressures to conformity brought on by urbanization and technology." Nedzi was met by resistance and fellow Representative H.R. Gross was a vocal opponent of the bill. Gross most frequently cited budgetary constraints as the reason why he didn't support the bill. He questioned the necessity of funding yet another cultural organisation in light of that year's National Endowment for the Arts and Humanities $64,025,000 in government appropriations. However, Gross' concerns were not limited to finances. He took the opportunity to question the place of folk culture in national cultural organisations and asked why the National Endowment for the Arts, which was tasked with supporting humanities research, was "so little interested in this form of culture, if it may be called culture." Gross was giving voice to one side of a growing national conversation about American identity, one that had strong sentiment on each side, and he even went as far as to suggest that folklife might be anti-American: "I am reminded of a statement by former President Theodore Roosevelt who said: there is no room in this country for hyphenated Americanism. The one absolutely certain way of bringing this nation to ruin, of preventing all possibility of its continuing to be a nation at all, would permit it to become a tangle of squabbling nationalities." Unlike its predecessor, H.R. 17382 did not even pass in the House and was scrapped before it even made it to the Senate.

=== H.R. 6673 ===
Representative Frank Thompson, under the guidance of Nedzi, took up the cause for a third time and on 5 May 1975 introduced bill H.R. 6673 - substantially similar to H.R. 17382 - to the House. Once it had passed there, James Abourezk introduced it to the Senate. Seven years after first efforts to establish a federally supported folklife preservation and research center, H.R. 6673 was approved in both the House and the Senate. However, this version of the Act was met with some reservations from President Gerald Ford once it was passed to him for ratification. Accordingly, Assistant Attorney General Antonin Scalia delivered a report ruling on two potential constitutional concerns. The first was in regards to the separation of powers. Article 1 and Article 2 of the United States Constitution respectively delegate legislative powers to congress and executive powers to the president. Scalia was concerned the Act conflated these two roles because it proposed the Librarian of Congress - a congressional appointee - should carry out duties reserved for members of the Executive branch. The second concern was about the manner in which the center's trustees were to be appointed. After outlining the details of why these two points call into question some aspects of the Act's constitutionality, Scalia concludes that

it is our view that the provisions of this legislation are contrary to the strict provisions of the Constitution. It must be acknowledged, however, that in the area of cultural and educational affairs, the separation of powers may not have been strictly observed... Nonetheless, in light of the historical practice, we think the President can responsibly sign the present legislation with the expression of his serious reservation concerning the constitutional propriety of placing such functions outside the Executive Branch."

Nonetheless, on 2 January 1976, the first working day of the United States Bicentennial, President Ford signed the American Folklife Preservation Act and H.R.6673 became P.L. 94-201.

== Heads of the Archive ==
- Robert Winslow Gordon (1928–32)
- John Lomax (1933–42)
- Alan Lomax (1937–42)
- Benjamin A. Botkin (1942–45)
- Duncan Emrich (1945–55)
- Rae Korson (1956–69)
- Alan Jabbour (1969–74)
- Joseph C. Hickerson (1974 – 88)
- Alan Jabbour (1988 – 99, as director of the American Folklife Center)
- Peggy Bulger (1999 – 2002, as director of the American Folklife Center)
- Michael Taft (2002 – 2012)
- Nicole Saylor (2012 – )
