= The Three Worthy Butchers of the North =

Song

The Three Worthy Butchers of the North is an English broadside ballad from the 17th century. It tells the story of three butchers who come to the aid of a woman in trouble, only to be killed by the gang of thieves to which the woman belonged. Copies of the broadside can be found at The British Library and the National Library of Scotland.

== Synopsis ==
Three butchers, Johnson, Wilson and Kitson, live happily and buy three hundred pounds' worth of goods on credit. When the day comes to repay their creditors, they gather up their debt and begin riding down Blankly Lane when they hear a woman cry. Johnson wants to go help her, but Kitson warns him that it's a trick, and that if he had spent more time in Blankly Lane he would have heard her before. Johnson says he must help, and they ride to the woman. She tells the butchers that three ruffians have just robbed her. They took her clothes, tied her up and pinned her hair to the ground. The butchers untie her, wrap a cloak around her, and take off after the ruffians. Near the coast, the woman screams and ten thieves step out onto the road to confront them. Johnson vows to kill some of them before they kill him, but Kitson and Wilson don't want to fight, and they hand over the three hundred pounds.

In the second part of the ballad, Johnson tells his friends to watch his back as he fights. Five thieves tie up Kitson and Wilson while Johnson kills the other five with his five pistols. He kills another three with his sword before the woman hits him over the head with a club and kills him. She then bashes out the brains of Wilson and Kitson, saying that they lived as cowards so they will die as cowards. The woman and the thieves run to a ship at Yarmouth and sail away. A shepherd hidden in a hedge watches the whole thing, and then a gentleman comes upon the murdered bodies. The ballad ends with the narrator blessing true men, and hoping to keep them away from the thieves company.

== Cultural and Historical Significance ==
The ballad made its way to the United States in the form of a southern folk song, collected by Vance Randolph in his Ozark Folksongs (1946–50). The song has been found under a variety of names, including The Three Butchers, Johnson-Jinkson, Dixon and Johnson, and Bold Johnson. Lyle Lofgren criticizes Francis James Child for omitting the ballad from his collection and therefore stalling scholarly attention. Even though academics were ignoring the song, folk singers in England and America pared the song down to two butchers and half as many robbers and continued to both play the song and print it in stall ballads of the nineteenth century. By the time the song made it to the southern United States, it had been pared down to one hero, three robbers, and a woman.

=== Recordings ===
- Troy Cambron on Voices From the Dust Bowl: The Charles L. Todd and Robert Sonkin Migrant Worker Collection 1940-1941 (1940)
- Pete Seeger on American Ballads (1957)
- Peggy Seeger on Folk Songs and Ballads (1958)
- Roy Bailey on Roy Bailey (1971). Accompanied by Martin Carthy and Peter Knight.
- Gryphon on Gryphon (1973)
- Steeleye Span on Tempted and Tried (1989)
