= Harry Simms (labor leader) =

American trade unionist (1911–1932)

- Simms on the cover of the March 1932 Labor Defender
- Born: Harry Simms Hersh; December 25, 1911; Springfield, Massachusetts, U.S.
- Died: February 11, 1932 (aged 20); Barbourville, Kentucky, U.S.
- Political party: Young Communist League

Harry Simms Hersh (December 25, 1911 – February 11, 1932) was an American labor leader from Springfield, Massachusetts. He was sent by the National Miners Union to Harlan County, Kentucky during the Harlan County War to organize the mine workers there.

On February 10, 1932, Simms was shot near Brush Creek in Knox County, Kentucky by a sheriff's deputy who also worked as a mine guard for the local coal company. Simms died of his wound at Barbourville Hospital the next day. He was memorialized in a ballad, "The Death of Harry Simms" by Aunt Molly Jackson and Jim Garland, and his funeral service at the Bronx Coliseum attracted a crowd of some 20,000 people. The folk singer Pete Seeger popularized "The Death of Harry Simms" after learning it from Jim Garland at the Newport Folk Festival in the 1960s. Tao Rodriguez Seeger has performed a cover version of the song with the Allegro Youth Orchestra.
