= Gordon "Inferno" Collection =

The Robert W. Gordon "Inferno" Collection is about 200 pages of original and typescript copies of correspondence and letters that were separated from the main collection of the Archive of Folk Song, Library of Congress, by Robert W. Gordon, first head of the folklife department in the Library of Congress, or a third party, due to their bawdy and scatological subject matter. In January 1974, Debora Kodish, folklorist and founder of the Philadelphia Folklore Project, prepared a 14-page index to the collection that lists informant, date, location and title of the texts.

== See also ==
- American Folklife Center
- Archive of Folk Culture
