= Mairéad Nic Craith =

Irish author

Máiréad Nic Craith
- Citizenship: Irish
- Occupations: Author, academic, folklorist

Academic work
- Discipline: Folklore, cultural Studies

Mairéad Nic Craith is an Irish author, academic and scholar. She currently serves as professor of public folklore at the University of the Highlands and Islands (UHI).

== Academic career ==
Nic Craith graduated with a BEd from the College of Education, Limerick and began work as a primary school teacher in Cork in 1980. Continuing as a part-time student in University College Cork, she graduated with a BA (1983), an MA (1985) and a PhD (1990). She started her academic career as lecturer at the University of Liverpool’s Institute of Irish Studies, sponsored by the Irish Government. She has been appointed to Chair positions at Ulster University in Northern Ireland and at Heriot-Watt University in Edinburgh. Nic Craith has served as DAAD Professor at the University of Göttingen and as Honorary Professor at the Universities of Exeter and Ulster. In 1984, Nic Craith received the Ruth Michaelis-Jena Ratcliff Research Prize for Folklife. She was elected to the Royal Irish Academy in 2009 and Academy of Social Sciences in 2020. She has collaborated with international organizations such as the UN, UNESCO, the European Union, and the European Centre for minority issues. In 2018, she was a visiting scholar at the Department of Celtic Languages and Literature, Harvard University.

Mairéad Nic Craith’s research covers several areas. She explores how cultural traditions can survive globalization and how culture affects sustainable development, focusing on traditional Irish-Gaelic knowledge and its loss due to anglicization. She has a strong interest in island communities, especially the Great Blasket Island, and how these places shape Irish identity through art and folklore. Her work on language looks at how politics influences language use, especially in post-conflict regions, working with groups like the European Centre for Minority Issues. She also focuses on intangible cultural heritage, its social impact, and has advised organizations like the European Commission and the United Nations on heritage and human rights.

Nic Craith has authored or edited eighteen books and many scholarly essays on cultural and linguistic policy, sustainability, narrative, and heritage.

== Selected publications ==
- Nic Craith, Máiréad (2019). The Vanishing World of The Islandman: Narrative and Nostalgia. Springer Nature. ISBN 978-3-030-25775-0.
- Nic Craith, Máiréad (2012). "Narratives of Place, Belonging and Language". Springer. doi:10.1057/9780230355514.
- Nic Craith, Máiréad (2006). Europe and the Politics of Language: citizens, migrants and outsiders. Palgrave Macmillan. ISBN 978-1-4039-1833-8.
- Nic Craith, Máiréad (2003). "Culture and Identity Politics in Northern Ireland". Springer. doi:10.1057/9781403948113.
- Nic Craith, Máiréad (2002). Plural Identities--singular Narratives: The Case of Northern Ireland. Berghahn Books. ISBN 978-1-57181-772-3.
- Nic Craith, Máiréad (1993). Malartú teanga: an Ghaeilge i gCorcaigh sa Naoú hAois Déag (in Irish). Cumann Eorpach Leann na hEireann. ISBN 978-3-930018-02-4
- CNic Craith, Máiréad (1988). An tOileanach léannta. Clóchomhar Teo: 57.
