= Alexander Bryan Johnson bibliography =

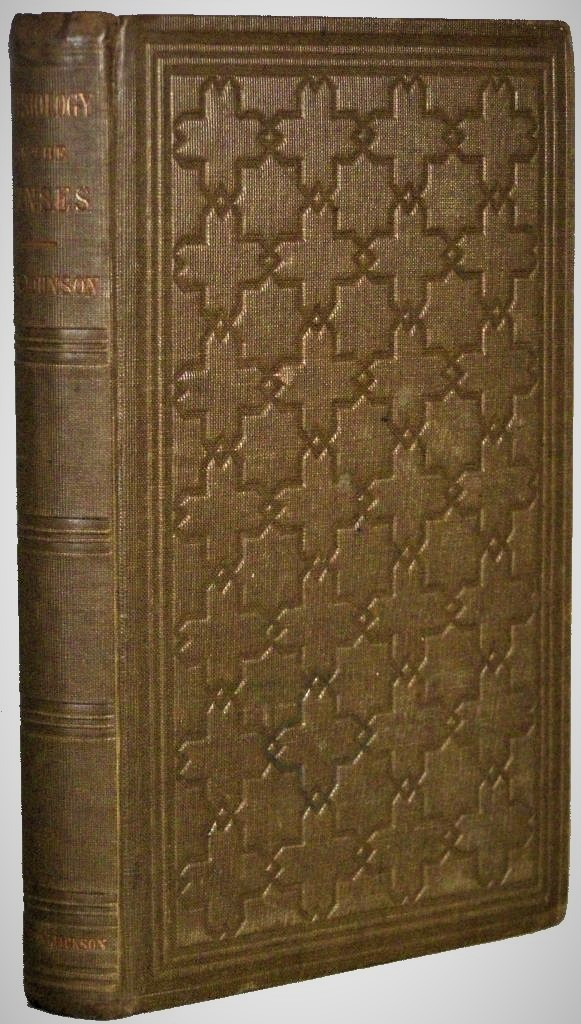
Physiology Of The Senses - First Edition

The following bibliography of Alexander Bryan Johnson provides a chronological list of the published works of English-American philosopher Alexander B. Johnson (1786–1867). Many of Johnson's works can be accessed free via Open Library or other online repositories.

== Works ==
=== Books ===
- An Inquiry into the Nature of Value and of Capital, and into the Operation of Government Loans, Banking Institutions and Private Credit, with Appendix Containing an Inquiry into the Causes which Regulate the Rate of Interest, and the Price of Stocks (Published for the author by John Forbes, Printer, New York, 117pp. 1813)
- The Philosophy of Human Knowledge, or a Treatise on Language (New York: G. & C. Carvill, 200pp. 1828)
- A Treatise on Language: or The relation Which Words Bear to Things (New York: Harper & Brothers, 274pp. 1836)
- Religion in Its Relation to the Present Life. In a Series of Lectures, Delivered before the Young Men's Association of Utica (New York: Harper & Brothers, 180pp. 1841) (The book also appeared under the title "Morality and Manners" as a 1862 reprint by Harper & Brothers)
- The Philosophical Emperor: A Political Experiment; or the Progress of a False Position, dedicated to the Whigs, Conservatives, Democrats and Loco Focos individually and collectively, of the United States (New York: Harper & Brothers, 112pp. 1841)
- The Meaning of Words: Analyzed into Words and Unverbal Things, and Unverbal Things Classified into Intellections, Sensations, and Emotions (New York: D. Appleton & Co., 256pp. 1854),
- The Physiology of the Senses, or How and What We See, Hear, Taste, Feel, and Smell (New York and Cincinnati: Derby and Jackson, 214pp. 1856)
- An Encyclopaedia of Instruction; or, Apologues and Breviates on Men and Manners (New York: Derby and Jackson, 409pp. 1857) (This work also appeared under the title Guide to Knowledge and Wealth.)
- A Guide to the Right Understanding of Our American Union, or political, Economical and Literary Miscellanies (New York: Derby and Jackson, 407pp. 1857)
- Deep Sea Soundings and Explorations of the Bottom; or The Ultimate Analysis of Human Knowledge (Boston: privately printed, 78pp. 1861)

=== Pamphlets ===
- An Inquiry into the Natural Rights of Man, as Regards the Exercise of Expatriation; Dedicated to all the Adopted Citizens of the United States; by a Gentleman of the City of New York (New York: Pelsue and Gould, 1813).
- Address before the Utica Lyceum, Delivered February 5, 1824 (Utica: H. Gray). 8vo., 13 pp.
- Oration Commemorative of American Independence, Delivered at Utica: July 5, 1824 (Utica: William Williams, printer). 8vo.,16 pp.
- An Address to the Utica Forum, Delivered December 9, 1824 (Utica: William Williams, printer), 8vo., 16 pp.
- Address to the Utica Lyceum, February 17, 1825, Prefatory to His Course of Lectures, "The Philosophy of Human Knowledge" (Utica: Merrell & Hastings). 8vo., 16 pp.
- Address to the Utica Temperance Society, Delivered July 29, 1829 (Utica: William Williams, printer). 8vo., 16 pp.
- Method of Acquiring a Full Knowledge of the English Language, Propounded at Their Invitation by A. B. Johnson, Utica, August 10, 1831, before the New York State Lyceum Utica: (Northway & Porter). 15 pp.
- A Discourse on Language (Utica: William Williams, printer). 28 pp. 1832
- Speech before an Auxiliary of the American Colonization Society, Utica, January 13, 1834 (Utica, William Williams, printer), 16PP.
- Speech before a Meeting of the Democratic Citizens of Utica, on the Subject of the United States Bank, March 25, 1834 (Utica: E. A. Maynard).
- Letter to Nathan Williams, Containing His Views on the Coming Election (Albany: Albany Argus). 4 pp. An "extra" issued by the Argus. 1834
- On the Political Contest (Utica). 1834
- Thoughts on the Necessity for, and Action of, the Approaching State Convention (Utica: I. S. Clark). 51 pp. Reprinted from articles in the Democrat. 1846
- A Treatise on Banking (Utica: Seward and Thurber). 8vo.,44 pp. Reprinted from The Bankers' Magazine, vol, III, pp. 733ff. 1850
- The Advanced Value of Gold, Suspended Specie Payment, Legal-Tender Notes, Taxation and National Debt, Investigated Impartially (Utica: Curtiss & White). 8vo., 32 pp. 1862
- The Union as It Was, and the Constitution as It Is. N.p., author not named. 1862
- Where We Stood and Where We Stand. By the Author of The Union as It was. N.p., 13 pp. 1863
- Our Monetary Condition. N.p., 8vo., 21 pp. 1864
- The Approaching Presidential Election. N.p., 8vo., pp. 1864

=== Articles ===
- "Immorality of Tight Lacing" (signed "Matilda"). The Mother's Magazine, Vol. 1. 1833
- "The Wilmot Proviso." Utica Observer, August 24, 1847.
- "How to Live Where You Like, a Legend of Utica." Knickerbocker Magazine, November 1849.
- "The Argumentative Husband and the Husband Who Denied His Wife Nothing; or A Secret Worth Knowing." Knickerbocker Magazine, December 1849.
- "Feminine Perfections, or the Unreasonable Bachelor." Knickerbocker Magazine, January 1850.
- "How to Prosper: or the Fatal Mistake." Knickerbocker Magazine, February 1850.
- "The Hermit of Utica." Knickerbocker Magazine, March 1850.
- "How to Be Happy." Knickerbocker Magazine, April 1850.
- "The Philosophical Emperor: or an Experiment in Morals." Knickerbocker Magazine, May–June 1850.
- "Story of the Man Whom Nobody Can Benefit, and the Man Whom Nobody Can Injure." Knickerbocker Magazine, July 1850.
- "The Three Views of Life." Knickerbocker Magazine, August 1850.
- "A Day at Utica: or the First House-warming." Knickerbocker Magazine, September 1850.
- "The Obstacles to Success." Knickerbocker Magazine, October 1850.
- "Advantages and Disadvantages of Private Corporations." Hunt's Merchants' Magazine, December 1850.
- "Legislative History of Corporations in New York; or The Progress of Liberal Principles." Hunt's Merchants' Magazine, December 1850.
- "The Philosophy of the Union; or The Principles of Its Cohesiveness." United States Magazine and Democratic Review, January 1851.
- "The Constitutional Power of Congress over Public Improvements." United States Magazine and Democratic Review, February 1851.
- "The Internal Management of a Country Bank" (an unsigned review of Thomas Bullion's book of this title), Hunt's Merchants Magazine, February 1851.
- "The Present and Prospective Value of Gold." Hunt's Merchants' Magazine, March 1851.
- "The Veto Power of the President." United States Magazine and Democratic Review, March 1851.
- "Duties, Omissions, and Misdoings of Bank Directors." Hunt's Merchants' Magazine, April 1851.
- "The Philosophy of Joint-Stock Banking" (a review of G.M. Bell's book). Hunt's Merchants Magazine, August 1851.
- "The Threefold Nature of Man: A Legend of the Oneida Indians." Knickerbocker Magazine, August 1851.
- "The Philosophical Sparrow," Knickerbocker Magazine, September 1851.
- "Relative Merits of Life Insurance and Savings Banks." Hunt's Merchants Magazine, December 1851.
- "The Lunatic Asylum of Boresko." Knickerbocker Magazine, March 1852.
- "The Maine Liquor Law." Rome (N.Y.) Daily Sentinel, October 25, 1854.
- "Our Political Disorders and Their Remedy." Utica Observer, July 30, 1856. (Reprinted from the Albany Atlas & Argus.)
- "The Principles of American Liberty." Albany Atlas & Argus, 4 September 1856.
- "The Political and Economical Influence of Usury Laws." Albany Evening Journal 1856
- "The Almighty Dollar; or, Money as a Motive for Action." Hunt's Merchants' Magazine, January 1857.

=== Other ===
- Prospectus for a book entitled The Philosophy of Human Knowledge. 1818
- Prospectus: A Collated Dictionary; or A Complete Index to the English Language. 1830
- The Alternative of Continuing Our State Debt, or Liquidating It by Taxation (Exact title not known.) 1834
- "The Bank Panic and Pressure." (Published October 6, 1834.)
- "The Mode of Selecting a New President." (Published June 9, 1835, and addressed to the Democratic Electors of the 17th Congressional District of New York.)
- "An Obituary Notice of the Life of Judge Nathan Williams." 1835
- "The Suspension of Specie Payments." (Address to a convention of bank representatives at New York, 1837.)
- "The Alternative of Borrowing Disadvantageously, or Suspending the Public Works." 1842
- "The Alternative of Debt or Taxation." 1842 (See also first title under 1834.)
- "The Annexation of Texas." 1844
- "Texas Annexed." 1845
- "The Excise License Question." 1846
- "The Anatomy of Politics." (Published March 21, 1848.)
- "The Slavery Question." (Published August 30, 1848.)
- "Merits and Demerits of Existing Parties." (Published September 2, 1848.)
- "The Vices of Political Minorities." 1848
- "The Southern Disunionists." (Published December 17, 1849.)
- "The President's Constitutional Advisers." 1851
- "Reserved Rights of American Citizens." 1854
- "The Kansas-Nebraska Question." (Two articles, the second published March 20, 1854.)
- "Eulogy on a Body Corporate." 1855
- "The Clayton-Bulwer Treaty." 1856
- "Political and Economic Influence of Usury Laws." 1857

== Online Resources ==
"The Online Books Page: A. B. Johnson". HathiTrust Digital Library.

"Alexander Bryan Johnson: American philosopher and semanticist". Britannica. 25 May 2023.
