= Benjamin A. Botkin =

American folklorist and scholar

- Born: Benjamin Albert Botkin; February 7, 1901; East Boston, Massachusetts, United States
- Died: July 30, 1975 (aged 74); Croton-on-Hudson, New York, United States
- Education: Harvard University; Columbia University; University of Nebraska
- Spouse: Gertrude Fritz (1905-1993)
- Children: Dorothy Ann Rosenthal (1934-2024); Daniel Benjamin

Benjamin Albert Botkin (February 7, 1901 – July 30, 1975) was an American folklorist and scholar.

== Early life ==
Botkin was born on February 7, 1901, in East Boston, Massachusetts, to Lithuanian Jewish immigrants. He attended the English High School of Boston and then studied at Harvard University, where he graduated magna cum laude in 1920 with a B.A. in English. He earned his M.A. in English at Columbia University a year later in 1921, and his Ph.D. from the University of Nebraska in 1931, where he studied under Louise Pound and William Duncan Strong.

== Career ==
Botkin taught at the University of Oklahoma in the early 1920s and married Gertrude Fritz in 1925. He edited the annual Folk-Say from 1929 to 1932 and a little magazine, Space, from 1934 to 1935. Contributors to Folk-Say included Carl Sandburg, Langston Hughes, Henry Roth, J. Frank Dobie, Louise Pound, Alexander Haggerty Krappe, Stanley Vestal, Alain Locke, Sterling Brown, Paul Horgan, and Mari Sandoz. He became national folklore editor and chairman of the Federal Writers' Project in 1938, a post he held until 1941. Along with Charles Seeger, he organized a massive research and recording campaign centered on American music. From 1942 to 1945, Botkin headed the Archive of American Folk Song at the Library of Congress where he focused attention on the emerging aspects of folklore in modern life. During that time, he also served as president of the American Folklore Society.

At a panel of the 1939 Writers' Congress, which also included Aunt Molly Jackson, Earl Robinson, and Alan Lomax, Botkin spoke of what writers had to gain from folklore: "He gains a point of view. The satisfying completeness and integrity of folk art derives from its nature as a direct response of the artist to a group and group experience with which he identifies himself and for which he speaks." Botkin called on writers to utilize folklore in order to "make the inarticulate articulate and above all, to let the people speak in their own voice and tell their own story."

Botkin was harassed and subject to surveillance for many years by the F.B.I. A recent study by Professor Susan G. Davis documents extensive surveillance of Botkin over more than a decade.

Botkin died on July 30, 1975, in his home in Croton-on-Hudson, New York.

== Approach to folklore ==
Botkin embraced the ever-evolving state of folklore. According to him, folklore was not static but ever changing and being created by people in their daily lives. He developed his novel approach to American folklore while teaching in Oklahoma and later working in the federal government, as part of the Federal Writers' Project, during the late 1930s and the early 1940s. He became Folklore editor of the Writers' Project in 1938. His efforts working with the Library of Congress led to the preservation and publication of the ex-slave narratives, part of the Federal Writers' Project. His book Lay My Burden Down: A Folk History of Slavery was the first book to use oral narratives of formerly enslaved African Americans as legitimate historical sources.

Many researchers viewed folklore as a relic from the past, but Botkin and other New Deal folklorists insisted that American folklore played a vibrant role in the present by drawing on shared experience and promoting a democratic culture. Botkin served as the head of the Archive of American Folk Song of the Library of Congress (formerly held by John Lomax and Alan Lomax) between 1942 and 1945. He became a board member of People's Songs Inc., a forerunner to Sing Out!, during the mid '40s. At that time Botkin left his government post to devote full-time to writing. During the '40s and '50s he compiled and edited a series of books on folklore, including A Treasury of American Folklore (1944), A Treasury of New England Folklore (1947), A Treasury of Southern Folklore (1949), A Treasury of Western Folklore (1951), A Treasury of Railroad Folklore (with Alvin F. Harlow, 1953), A Treasury of Mississippi River Folklore (1955), and A Civil War Treasury of Tales, Legends and Folklore (1960).

In his foreword to A Treasury of American Folklore, Botkin explained his values: "In one respect it is necessary to distinguish between folklore as we find it and folklore as we believe it ought to be. Folklore as we find it perpetuates human ignorance, perversity, and depravity along with human wisdom and goodness. Historically we cannot deny or condone this baser side of folklore — and yet we may understand and condemn it as we condemn other manifestations of human error." Accordingly, during the '50s and '60s Richard M. Dorson attacked Botkin's work, which he considered unscholarly, calling much of what was included in his books "fakelore." Botkin ignored Dorson and disregarded his criteria. Folklore, he believed, was an art to be shared, not an exclusive artifact for scholars. His idea that folklore is basically creative expression used to communicate and instill social values, traditions, and goals, is widely accepted by folklorists today. Botkin insisted that democracy is strengthened by the valuing of myriad cultural voices. He is considered the "Father of Public Folklore."

== On-going Memorial Activities ==
In his honor, the American Folklore Society awards the Benjamin A. Botkin Prize to individuals whose work in documenting American folklore has deepened the conversation of the way in which people create an art that reflects their reality and transmits culture and understanding.

The American Folklife Center at the Library of Congress runs a series of lectures in his honor where "distinguished experts speaking about their research and current issues and best practices in folklore, folklife, ethnomusicology, and related fields". The lectures are then published by AFC and made available on their website.
