= Henry Reed (musician) =

- Born: James Henry Neel Reed; April 28, 1884; Monroe County, West Virginia
- Died: February 8, 1968 (aged 83)
- Genre: Old-time music
- Instruments: Fiddle, banjo

James Henry Neel Reed (April 28, 1884 – February 8, 1968) was an American fiddler and banjoist in the Appalachian music tradition. Reed became known for his fiddle tunes only after Alan Jabbour and the Hollow Rock String Band spread his music. Reed never had a professional career as a fiddler but was able to influence many other musicians through a relationship with his apprentice Alan Jabbour.

== Early life ==
John Brown's a-Hanging on a Sour Apple Tree
John Brown's a-Hanging on a Sour Apple Tree, played by Henry Reed

Henry Reed was born in Monroe County, West Virginia, on April 28, 1884. He was the youngest of the eight children of Marion Reed and Sophia Catherine Underwood Reed. Reed grew up in Monroe County in a large extended family and spent most of his life in the surrounding area. At the age of 23 Reed married Nettie Ann Virginia Mullins on December 11, 1907. They settled down in Glen Lyn, Virginia. Reed spent the next few years working at the Appalachian Power plant and raising his family, which eventually grew to twelve children.

== Career ==
Reed is one of the few Appalachian musicians that became known for his music without playing professionally. Reed was recognized for his fiddling shortly after meeting Alan Jabbour in 1966. Jabbour was an apprentice to Reed, listening, recording and learning Reed's tunes on the Fiddle and harmonica. Alan Jabbour's band, the Hollow Rock String Band, used many of Reed's tunes in their music. As the band played Reed's tunes at more shows he became more of a public figure, and eventually began to be recognized for his music. In 1968, the Hollow Rock String band released a long-playing record, The Hollow Rock String Band: Traditional Dance Tunes. This record was made up of many tunes from Reed. The tune "Over the Waterfall" was produced by the Hollow Strings Band and is one of Reed's most well-known compositions.

=== Fiddle Technique ===
Reed's tunes include a variety of genres. According to Alan Jabbour's recordings, Reed often played "classic tunes, classic vintage, waltzes, schottisches, clogs, rag-like pieces from both grassroots and popular sources and several marches from the nineteenth-century fifing tradition." Not all of the techniques Reed used to produce these genres were common among many fiddlers. Reed held the fiddle under his chin allowing his left hand to be free. Freeing up his left hand made it possible for him to achieve notes in the third position which included keys like a high D or C. Reed also had a particular way of holding the bow at the frog rather than choking it up higher like other fiddlers do. By gripping the bow on the frog Reed was able to achieve slurs into his playing; This style was referred to as the "longbow style." Slurs are multiple notes in the same stroke of the bow allowing for a more diverse sound to come from the fiddle. The most unusual feature of his bow technique was the placement of his fifth finger underneath the nut rather than on the top of it.

== Death ==
Reed died at the age of 84 on February 8, 1968, due to a blood clot. The blood clot that was formed a month after a surgery to have his foot amputated because of an infection. His wife, Nettie died the following year. They are buried next to each other in Pearisburg.

== Legacy ==
Reed's name and legacy continue on through the Henry Reed Fund and the Annual Henry Reed Memorial Fiddlers Convention.

The Henry Reed Fund was started by Alan Jabbour in 1999. Alan explains why he created this fund by expressing his desire "to provide support for initiatives benefiting folk artists and taping the collections of the American Folklife Center. In doing so, [the Henry Reed Fund] also commemorates the important cultural process through which the artistry of people like Henry Reed is shared with younger generations and provides continuing enrichment for our cultural life." The Annual Henry Reed Convention was started in 2003 in honor of Reed. This convention allows fiddlers to get together in Glen, Virginia once a year to share their music.

== Films ==
- The Henry Reed Legacy (2009). Directed by Chris Valluzzo and Sean Kotz. Horse Archer Productions.
