= Archie Green =

American folklorist (1917–2009)

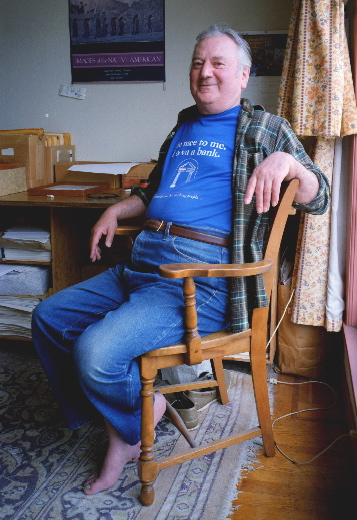
- Archie Green at home, ca. 1993; photograph by Hazen Robert Walker
- Born: Aaron Green; June 29, 1917; Winnipeg, Manitoba, Canada
- Died: March 22, 2009 (aged 91); San Francisco, California, U.S.
- Occupation: Folklorist

Archie Green (June 29, 1917 – March 22, 2009) was an American folklorist specializing in laborlore (defined as the special folklore of workers) and American folk music. Devoted to understanding vernacular culture, he gathered and commented upon the speech, stories, songs, emblems, rituals, art, artifacts, memorials, and landmarks which constitute laborlore. He is credited with winning Congressional support for passage of the American Folklife Preservation Act of 1976 (P.L. 94-201), which established the American Folklife Center in the Library of Congress.

== Early life and work ==
Born Aaron Green in Winnipeg, Manitoba he moved with his parents to Los Angeles, California in 1922. He grew up in southern California, began college at UCLA, and transferred to the University of California at Berkeley, from which he received a bachelor's degree in political science in 1939. He joined the Civilian Conservation Corps and spent his year of service in a camp on the Klamath River as a road builder and firefighter. He then worked in the San Francisco, California shipyards and served in the U.S. Navy during World War II. He was a member of the United Brotherhood of Carpenters and Joiners of America for over sixty-seven years and was a Journeyman Shipwright. His pro-labor orientation owed much to his upbringing. His parents were Jewish-Ukrainian immigrants from Chernigov, where his father had participated in the uprising against the Russian czar in 1905. When that revolution failed, they escaped to Canada. In the U.S., Green's father, a socialist, supported Eugene V. Debs, the campaign of Upton Sinclair for governor of California in 1934, and became a supporter of President Franklin D. Roosevelt's New Deal. While living in Los Angeles, Green regularly heard political speeches in Pershing Square. Describing himself as an "anarcho-syndicalist with strong libertarian leanings," or a "left-libertarian," Green combined a sensitivity for working people, an abiding concern for democratic processes, and a pragmatic willingness to lobby for reforms. He spent his career not only collecting material from laborers, but encouraging workers themselves to document and preserve their own lore.

In 1942, Green purchased the album Work Songs of the U.S.A. performed by folk singer Huddie "Leadbelly" Ledbetter. His love of music and especially the song "Old Man" sparked his interest in folkloristics, but it was to be nearly two decades before he returned to formal academia.

== Academic career ==
Green enrolled in graduate school in 1958, earning an M.L.S. degree from the University of Illinois in 1960 and a Ph.D. in folklore from the University of Pennsylvania in 1968. He combined his support for labor and love of country music in the research that became his first book, Only a Miner. In the same period he recorded "Girl of Constant Sorrow," an LP of songs sung by Sarah Ogan Gunning, the sister of coalminer, songwriter, and labor leader Jim Garland. Green joined the University of Illinois at Urbana-Champaign in 1960, where he held a joint appointment in the Institute of Labor and Industrial Relations and the English Department until 1972. Working as a senior staff associate at the AFL-CIO Labor Studies Center in the early 1970s, he initiated programs presenting workers' traditions at the Smithsonian Institution's Festival of American Folklife on the National Mall, and from 1969 to 1976 he left academia to live in Washington, D.C., where he led the successful legislative campaign to enact the American Folklife Preservation Act. He became known for his work on occupational folklore and on early hillbilly music recordings. In 1975 he joined the faculty of the University of Texas at Austin. He was awarded the Bingham Humanities Professorship at the University of Louisville in 1977, and was a Woodrow Wilson Center fellow in Washington, D.C., in 1978. His articles have appeared in Appalachian Journal, Journal of American Folklore, Labor's Heritage, Musical Quarterly, and other periodicals and anthologies. He retired from the University of Texas at Austin in June 1982, and established an archive for his collected materials in the Southern Folklife Collection at the University of North Carolina at Chapel Hill.

== Later work ==
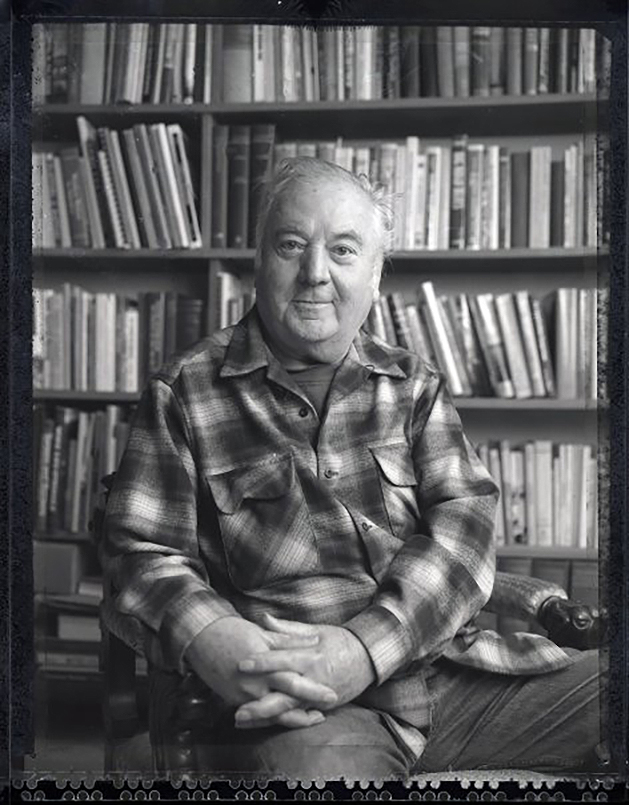
Green in San Francisco, California

In retirement from teaching, Green continued to write and publish the results of years of research. He completed books on the tinsmiths' art, using examples from northern California (Tin Men, 2002); a monograph on millwrights in northern California over the 20th century (2003); and a collection of essays on the Sailor's Union of the Pacific (2006).

Also notable was the 2007 publication of The Big Red Songbook, featuring the lyrics to the 190 songs included in the various editions of the Industrial Workers of the World's Little Red Songbooks from 1909 to 1973. Green inherited the project from John Neuhaus, a machinist and Wobbly a (member of the Industrial Workers of the World) who devoted years to collecting a nearly complete set of the IWW songbooks and determining what music the songs had been set to. When Neuhaus died of cancer in 1958, he gave his unique collection of songbooks, sheet music and other materials to Green, who vowed to carry on Neuhaus's vision of a complete edition of IWW songs. Green deposited Neuhaus's original materials in the folklife archive at the University of North Carolina.

At home in San Francisco, Green served as secretary of the nonprofit Fund for Labor Culture & History. Founded in July 2000, the Fund has worked with the National Trust for Historic Preservation to identify labor landmarks in San Francisco and install commemorative plaques, supported the publication of books on roots music, labor songs and historic labor landmarks, prepared guides to films on skilled union craftsmen, and helped the United Mine Workers restore the Ludlow Monument in Colorado. A visit to Archie Green's home often began with his salutation, "Greetings, fellow worker." He would always assist any researcher or student, but he would likewise always find something for them do go out and do. Green also brought together unionists, activists, scholars, and artists in "Laborlore Conversations," a series of conferences on working class culture. Green was unable to attend the fourth of these conferences in August 2007, where he was honored with the Living Legend Award from the Librarian of Congress.

In 2011, University of Illinois Press published Sean Burns' biography of Archie Green entitled Archie Green: The Making of a Working Class Hero. The biography, which argues that the trajectory and accomplishments of Green's life can importantly challenge and expand Communist Party-centered histories of the Popular Front, received the CLR James Book Award for 2012 awarded by the Working Class Studies Association.

== Honors ==
- In 1995 he received the Benjamin A. Botkin Prize for outstanding achievement in public folklore from the American Folklore Society.
- In August 2007 he received the Living Legend award from the Library of Congress.

== Death ==
Archie Green died of renal failure at his home in San Francisco, California, on March 22, 2009.

== Books by Archie Green ==
- Only a Miner: Studies in Recorded Coal-Mining Songs (University of Illinois Press, 1972).
- Wobblies, Pile Butts, and Other Heroes (University of Illinois Press, 1993).
- Songs About Work (Indiana University Folklore Institute, 1993).
- Calf's Head & Union Tale (University of Illinois Press, 1996).
- Torching the Fink Books & Other Essays on Vernacular Culture (The University of North Carolina Press, 2001). ISBN 0-8078-2605-7
- Tin Men (University of Illinois Press, 2002).
- Millwrights in Northern California, 1901-2002 (Northern California Carpenters Regional Council, 2003).
- Harry Lundeberg's Stetson & Other Nautical Treasures (Crockett, CA: Carquinez Press, 2006). ISBN 0-9744124-3-0
- Co-editor, with David Roediger, Franklin Rosemont, and Salvatore Salerno,The Big Red Songbook (Chicago: Charles H. Kerr Publishing Co., 2007). ISBN 0-88286-277-4

== Biography ==
- Sean Burns, Archie Green: The Making of a Working-Class Hero (University of Illinois Press, 2011). ISBN 978-0-252-07828-6
