= The Three Butchers =

Traditional song

"The Three Butchers", "Bold Johnson", "Dixon and Johnson" or "Johnson-Jinkson" (Roud # 17; Laws L4) is a traditional English folk ballad telling the story of how two or three butchers defeat seven or more robbers. There are a large number of versions of the song going by a variety of different titles.

== Synopsis ==
Two or three butchers, variously name Johnson, Dixon, Jinkson, Jackson, Dickie amongst others, are travelling on horseback when they see a naked woman tied up by the side of the road. They give her a coat and put her on one of their horses but it turns out that she is the bait for a band of robbers and she gives the signal that the trap has worked. The brigands spring out of their hiding place and set on her would-be rescuers. One of the butchers wants to run away but the other elects to fight and proceeds to kill all but one of the highwaymen, who runs away. The woman then kills this butcher by stabbing him in the back.

== Commentary ==
Originally printed as a broadside in England in the 17th century by Paul Burges, the ballad made its way to America where it was collected by Randolph in Ozark Folksongs amongst others. It was recorded by Charles Lafayette Todd and Robert Sonkin for the Library of Congress.

== Recordings ==
- Pete Seeger recorded the song on his album American Ballads (1957).
- Peggy Seeger included it on her album Folksongs and Ballads (1958).
- Roy Bailey recorded the song accompanied by Martin Carthy on guitar and Peter Knight on mandolin on the album Roy Bailey (1971) on the Trailer label (LER 3021).
- Gryphon recorded the song for their self-titled debut album Gryphon (1973).
- Steeleye Span recorded it as "Two Butchers" for the album Tempted and Tried (1989).

== Lyrics ==
Since this is a traditional folk song, the lyrics differ. However, in the modern era, the lyrics of the Gryphon and Roy Bailey versions of the song are very similar to the text below:

It's of three jolly butchers as I've heard many say:
They were going to some market town their money for to pay.
They rode together for a mile or two and a little more besides,
Said Johnson unto Jipson "Stop I heard a woman cry".
"Then stop I won't" said Jipson, "And stop I won't" said Ryde.
"Then stop I will" said Johnson, "For I heard a woman cry".
So Johnson he alighted and viewed the place around,
And saw a naked woman with her hair tied to the ground.
"How came you here?" said Johnson, "How came you here?" said he.
"Two highway men have robbed me that you can plainly see".
Then Johnson being a valiant man a man of courage bold,
He took the coat from off his back to keep her from the cold.
Then Johnson being a valiant man a man of valiant mind,
He sat her up upon his horse and mounted up behind,
And as they rode along the road as fast as they could ride.
She put her fingers to her lips and gave three piercing cries.
Out sprang ten bold highwaymen with weapons in their hands.
They strode up to young Johnson and boldly bid him stand.
"Stand I will" said Johnson "as long as ever I can.
For I was never in all my life afraid of any man".
Then Johnson being a valiant man he made those bullets fly,
'Til nine of them bold highwaymen all on the ground did lie.
This wicked woman standing by young Johnson did not mind,
She took a knife all from his side and stabbed him from behind.
This day it being a market day and people passing by,
They saw this woman's dreadful deed and raised a hue and cry.
Then she was down to Newgate brought and bound in irons strong,
For killing the finest butcher as ever the sun shone on.
