= Lucreaty Clark =

American folk artist

Lucreaty J. Clark
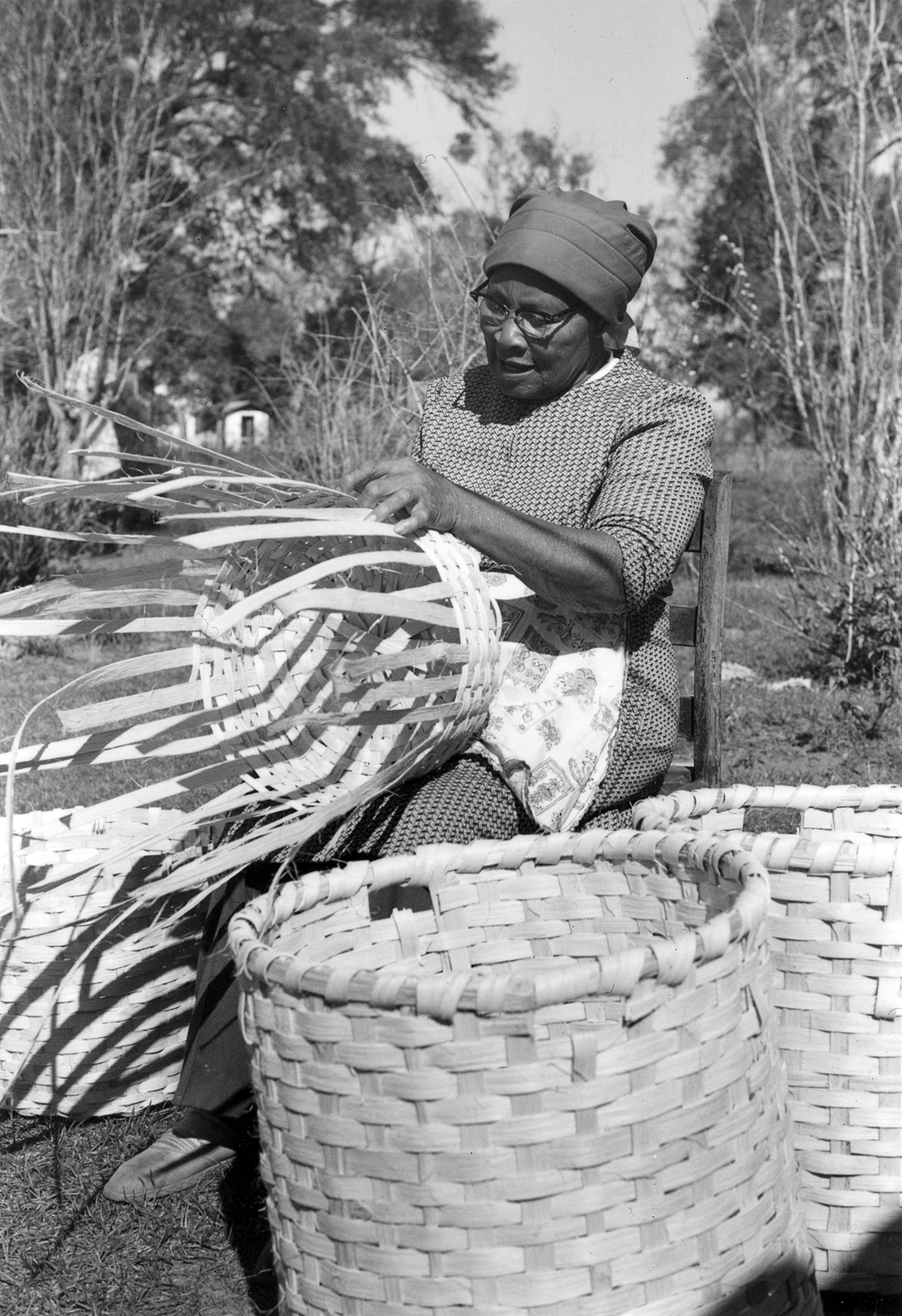
- Born: February 9, 1903; Jefferson County, Florida
- Died: May 1986 (aged 83); Lamont, Florida
- Occupation: Folk artist
- Known for: Basket weaving

Lucreaty J. Clark (February 9, 1903 – May 1986) was a Florida folk artist known for basket weaving. She learned how to weave white oak baskets from her parents.

Clark was born on February 9, 1903, in rural Jefferson County, Florida. She was one of the youngest of sixteen children in a family that worked on plantations, picking cotton and performing other farm related tasks. She learned how to weave baskets from white oak from her parents, who in turn learned the craft from their parents. Clark's grandparents were slaves on the Rindell plantation near Monticello, Florida.

Clark married in 1925.

== Legacy ==
James Dickerson, in an article for the Tallahassee Democrat described Clark's work:

Within her fingertips is carried the memory of an ancient African craft fast disappearing from the face of the Florida Panhandle. African slaves, once brought to the Panhandle to work on plantations, made baskets to hold cotton picked from the fields.

In 1985, Clark was awarded the Florida Folk Heritage Award.

Clark taught her grandson, Alphonso Jennings, the craft of weaving white oak baskets when he was a teenager. He further honed this skill in the 1983 Florida Folklife Apprenticeship Program and continued to share knowledge of basket making after Clark's death in 1986.

== See also ==
- Peggy Bulger, a folklorist and former director of the American Folklife Center at the Library of Congress
