= Eloise Hubbard Linscott =

Scholar of American folk music

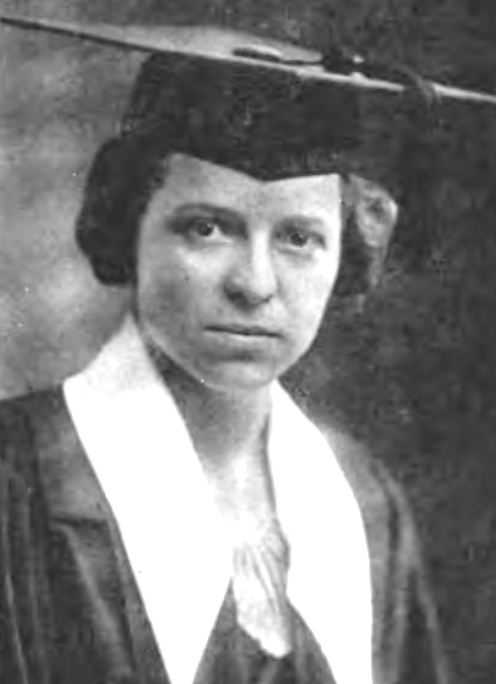
- Eloise Barrett Hubbard, from the 1920 yearbook of Radcliffe College
- Born: Eloise Barrett Hubbard; December 29, 1897; Taunton, Massachusetts
- Died: 1978 (aged 80–81)
- Occupation: Folklorist

Eloise Hubbard Linscott (December 29, 1897 – 1978) was a 20th-century American folklorist, song collector, and preservationist. She is the author of Folk Songs of Old New England (1939), considered a valuable scholarly source for American folk songs. John Lee Brooks described Folk Songs of Old New England as an American equivalent of Bishop Percy's 1765 work Reliques of Ancient English Poetry.

== Life and career ==
Linscott was born Eloise Barrett Hubbard and raised in Taunton, Massachusetts. She graduated from Radcliffe College in 1920 with a Bachelor of Arts in English Literature.

Linscott was initially inspired to begin her fieldwork to preserve the legacy of her own family's musical traditions, and because there were then no music books on traditional songs she had known as a girl. Folk Songs of Old New England was the culmination of about ten years of work. One important source of Folk Songs of Old New England was a collection of songs which had remained in the possession of the descendants of Elizabeth Foster Reed for over 150 years, which Linscott unearthed. Linscott used several other sources as well.

Although she continued her research and fieldwork with the intention of publishing other books, Folk Songs of Old New England was Linscott's only publication. However, she gave popular lectures on folk music at music societies, camps, women's clubs, and arts groups, where she would bring a guest fiddler, and sometimes sing.

In the 1940s, Linscott became involved with the National Folk Festival as a volunteer coordinator for New England musicians. She helped organize regional folk festivals, including ones held at the Boston Arena and Boston Public Garden.

Linscott used her own personal funding to finance the first ten years of her research. Around 1940, she gained sponsorship from Musicraft and in 1941 from the Library of Congress. In 1941, Linscott borrowed equipment from Alan Lomax (head of the Library's Archive of American Folk Song) and in two weeks delivered to Lomax 36 glass-core master acetate discs of folk songs. Lomax was a regular correspondent and mentor to her during this time.

Over the course of her career, Linscott gathered approximately 2500 recordings on cylinders, discs, and tapes, as well as other materials. One informant bestowed on her the nickname "The Tornado". Linscott's manuscripts, recordings, and other materials remain at the Eloise Hubbard Linscott Collection of the American Folklife Center in the Library of Congress.

== Personal life ==
Linscott had two sisters and three brothers. She married Charles Hardy Linscott in 1921; they lived in Needham, Massachusetts, and spent summers in Wolfeboro, New Hampshire. Linscott had one son, John Hubbard Linscott, born in 1929.

== Works ==
- Linscott, Eloise Hubbard, ed. (1939). Folk Songs of Old New England. New York and Dallas: Macmillan. Reprinted 2011, Dover Publications, ISBN 9780486278278
