= Alan Jabbour =

American musician and folklorist

- Born: Alan Jabbour; June 21, 1942; Jacksonville, Florida, U.S.
- Died: January 13, 2017 (aged 74) Washington, DC, U.S.
- Genres: Old-time; folk
- Occupations: Musician, folklorist
- Instrument: fiddle
- Labels: Rounder; Flying Fish; Not On Label; Patuxent; Autogram

Alan Jabbour (June 21, 1942 – January 13, 2017) was an American musician and folklorist, and the founding director of the American Folklife Center at the Library of Congress.

== Life and career ==
Jabbour was born in Jacksonville, Florida. His grandfather had immigrated to the United States from Syria, and his father later joined him. He was educated in the Jacksonville public schools and at the Bolles School, where he graduated from high school in 1959. He graduated magna cum laude from the University of Miami in 1963 and received his M.A. (1966) and Ph.D. (1968) from Duke University.

A violinist from the age of seven, Alan Jabbour was a member of the Jacksonville Symphony, the Brevard Music Festival Orchestra, the Miami Symphony, and the University of Miami String Quartet. While a graduate student, he became interested in American fiddle styles and traveled in North Carolina, Virginia, and West Virginia to record instrumental folk music, folksong, and folklore on tape. This collection, particularly rich in traditional fiddle tunes from the Upper South, is now in the Archive of Folk Culture at the Library of Congress.

The documentation trips merged into a process of apprenticeship, and he began playing the fiddle under the influence of new masters, particularly Henry Reed, who was then in his eighties. Out of this interaction arose a band of young musicians, the Hollow Rock String Band, which became the core of the old-time music scene that blossomed in Durham and Chapel Hill in the later 1960s. In 1968, the year that Henry Reed died, the band released a long-playing record, The Hollow Rock String Band: Traditional Dance Tunes.

In 1968 Alan Jabbour became an assistant professor of English and folklore at the University of California, Los Angeles. In 1969 he was appointed head of the Archive of Folk Song (now the Archive of Folk Culture) at the Library of Congress. He edited a long-playing record drawn from earlier recordings in the Archive, which was published in 1971 as American Fiddle Tunes. With Carl Fleischhauer, he undertook a three-year project to research, record, and photograph the history and traditions of a single Appalachian family, from which came the 1973 Library of Congress double record album The Hammons Family: A Study of a West Virginia Family's Traditions. In 1974 he moved to the National Endowment for the Arts to become founding director of that agency's grant-giving program in folk arts.

In 1976 Alan Jabbour became the founding director of the American Folklife Center in the Library of Congress, continuing in that position for twenty-three years before stepping down from the directorship and retiring from federal service in 1999. He has published widely on the subject of folklore and folklife, including a number of publications on American folksong and instrumental folk music. He has also been featured on recordings and in numerous festivals, is a repeat presenter and performer at Breakin' Up Winter and concerts as a performer on the fiddle. He has served on numerous panels and boards, including the D.C. Humanities Council (co-chair, 1987–88), the American Folklore Society (president, 1988), the Fund for Folk Culture (chair, 1991–94), the National Coalition for Heritage Areas (1993–97), the European Center for Traditional Culture (1996–98), and the Alliance for American Quilts (1996- ). Chairman of the Board of International Arts & Artists from May 2009 until January 2017.

To mark his retirement, Alan Jabbour established the Henry Reed Fund for Folk Artists, named for his mentor and dedicated to projects in support of folk artists, especially those represented in the collections of the American Folklife Center. (Folklorist Peggy Bulger replaced him as AFC director in 1999.) He died on January 13, 2017, at the age of 74.

== Discography ==
With Sandy’s Fancy

- Sandy’s Fancy - Alan Jabbour, Tommy Thompson, Sandy Bradley (Flying Fish FF260, 1981)

With James Reed and Bertram Levy

- A Henry Reed Reunion (Not On Label, 2002)

With Mike Seeger

- Fresh Oldtime String Band Music (Rounder 0262, 1988) [Jabbour plays on two tracks]

With Ken Perlman

- Southern Summits (Not On Label, 2005)

With Ken Perlman and Jim Watson

- You Can’t Beat The Classics (Not On Label, 2015)

With Stephen Wade

- Americana Concert: Alan Jabbour And Stephen Wade At The Library Of Congress (Patuxent Music, Patuxent CD-308, 2017)

With The Hollow Rock String Band

- The Hollow Rock String Band (Rounder 0024, 20154, 1974)
- Traditional Dance Tunes (Autogram, 1979)

Compilations

- Hollow Rock Legacy (Not On Label, 2004)

== See also ==
- Ralph Rinzler
