= National Miners' Union =

The National Miners' Union (NMU) was a dual workers' association established in 1928 in the United States of America under the aegis of the Red International of Labour Unions (Profintern), the international trade union authority of the Communist International (Comintern). The union was affiliated with the Trade Union Unity League, American counterpart of the Profintern.

The name of the union was briefly changed to Mine, Oil and Smelter Workers Industrial Union at the group's second convention in 1930, although not long after the organization reverted to its previous title.

The organization conducted controversial and violent strikes during 1931, culminating in a call for a general strike on New Year's Day, 1932. This effort was easily crushed and the NMU effectively broken and powerless until its dissolution at the behest of the Comintern in 1935.

== Organizational history ==
=== Establishment ===
In 1928 the Communist International (Comintern) and, by extension, its trade union appendage, the Red International of Labour Unions (Profintern) embarked upon a course of ultra-radicalism known as the Third period. A chief component of this policy, intended to fan the flames of revolution, provided for an end to the historic strategy of "boring from within" in favor of establishment of dual unions under the direct supervision and control of the communist political movement in each country.

This spelled an end to protracted efforts of the Workers (Communist) Party to gain control of the United Mine Workers of America (UMWA), headed by John L. Lewis, which was subsequently dismissed as a hopelessly reformist organization unsuitable for the perceived revolutionary task ahead.

On September 9 and 10, 1928, 500 delegates from around the United States met in Pittsburgh to establish a new national trade union of miners in opposition to the UMWA. This group had previously conducted its factional organizing work within the UMWA as the "Save the Union Committee," established in June 1928.

The convention was attacked by toughs allegedly under the direction of the John L. Lewis' regime, giving local police the opportunity to shut down the gathering. Consequently, the convention was forced to change its venue from the Pittsburgh Labor Lyceum to a new location in East Pittsburgh. This second session also ran afoul of authorities, with the sheriff of Allegheny County halting proceedings and banning all future gatherings of the delegates — a prohibition later revoked under pressure of civil rights groups. More than 100 delegates were ultimately arrested either at the convention or at their hotels in later police raids.

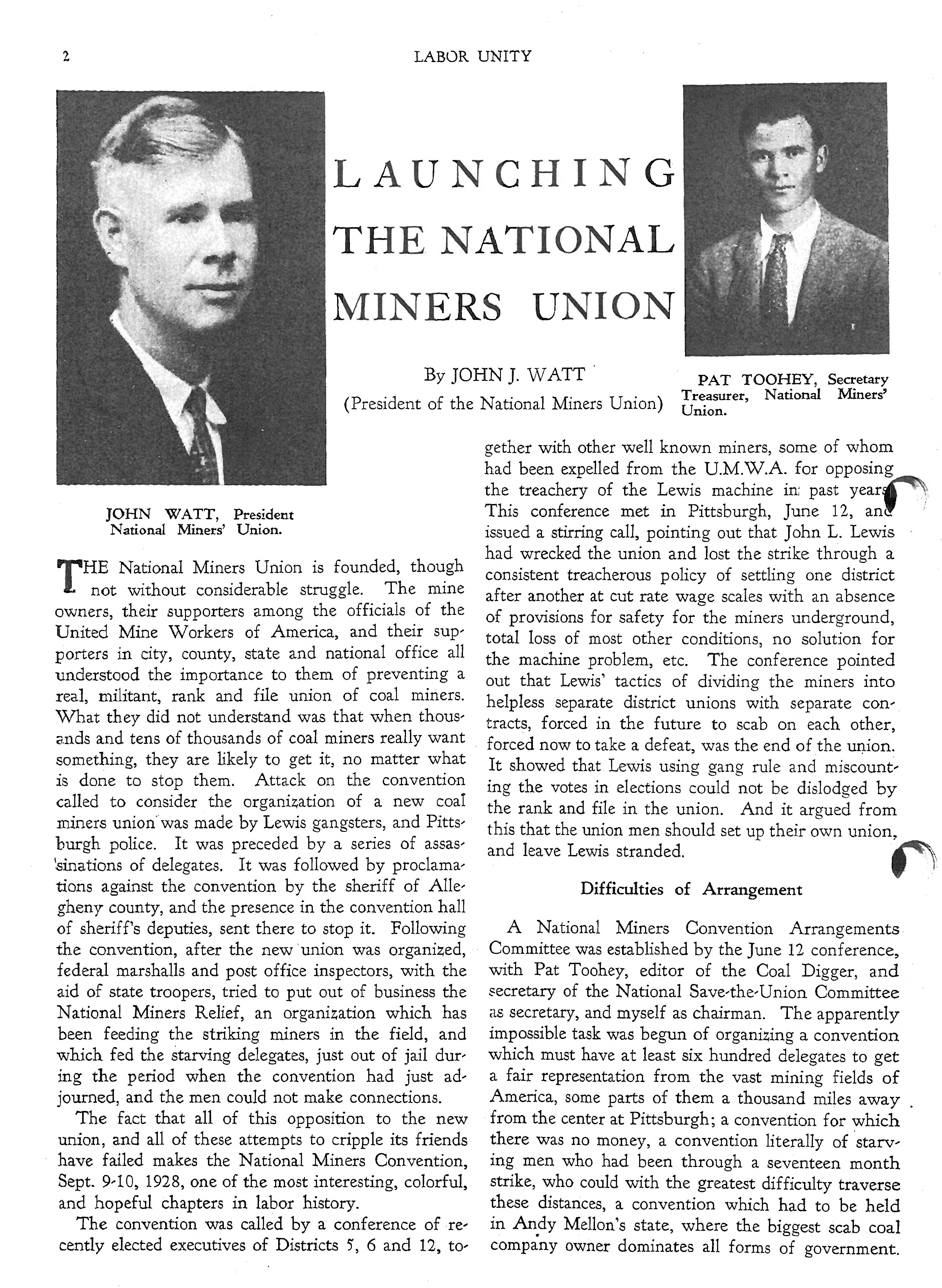
John J. Watt and Pat Toohey featured in Labor Unity, October 1928

John J. Watt was elected president of the new NMU, with William Boyce, a black miner from Indiana, elected vice-president, and Communist Party activist Patrick Toohey chosen as general secretary.

Unsurprisingly, the NMU was quick to formally affiliate with the newly launched Trade Union Unity League (TUUL), a federation of Communist-dominated unions, at the time of its establishment in August 1929.

=== Development ===
The NMU maintained national headquarters in Pittsburgh and governed its affairs through annual conventions. The union counted local organizations in the states of Illinois, Indiana, Kentucky, Ohio, Pennsylvania, and West Virginia — emphasizing the close connection of the group to the coal mining industry. These local affiliates were organized into districts, which were also governed by periodic conventions.

On July 26, 1930, the second national convention of the NMU at Pittsburgh changed the group's name to Mine, Oil and Smelter Workers Industrial Union in an attempt to reflect the group's broader organizational aspirations. The more simple NMU name remained in general use in the coal industry throughout the organization's existence, however. The official organ of the reorganized union was to be titled Mineral Worker, with a launch of December 1, 1930 slated. This changed proved to be short-lived, however, as within a year a reversion was made to the previous organizational name.

In May 1931, John Lewis' UMWA withdrew from a bitter strike in Harlan County, Kentucky, remembered to historians as the Harlan County War. The UMA moved in to fill the vacuum of leadership, hoping to radicalize striking workers and to win broad national support for their efforts. Mine owners were quick to capitalize on the newly emphasized presence of Communist Party activists, amping up political rhetoric and physical violence in an attempt to crush the strike. Quickly pushed onto the ropes despite the support of prominent members of the American literary intelligentsia, the NMU called a general strike on January 1, 1932 — an effort which was easily broken by the mine owners of the region. A blacklist of NMU members soon followed.

Under the leadership of new national secretary Frank Borich, the NMU also organized in the coalfields of eastern Ohio and western Pennsylvania, with a strike erupting in the summer of 1931 that ended in the death, injury, and jailing of a number of miners. The UMWA re-entered the strike and negotiated agreements with several mine operators, defusing the situation. By the end of the year the NMU was essentially broken.

=== Policies ===
Labor historian Gary M. Fink observes that while the rhetoric of the new NMU emphasized class struggle, in actual practice the organization worked for policy objectives long regarded as ordinary trade union reforms, such as a minimum wage of $35.00 per month, establishment of the 6-hour day and the five day workweek (with overtime pay), and the election of mine administrators tallying physical output.

=== Decline and dissolution ===
Although shattered by the dramatic and violent events of 1931, the NMU remained in existence until 1935, when the Comintern changed its tactics again to the Popular front, embracing once again the notion that communists should participate in established trade unions rather than pursue their aims through parallel organizations. Historian Gary Fink notes that "although accurate membership figures are unavailable, the NMU appears to have been largely a paper organization at the time of its dissolution."
