= Glen Lyn, Virginia =

- Unincorporated community
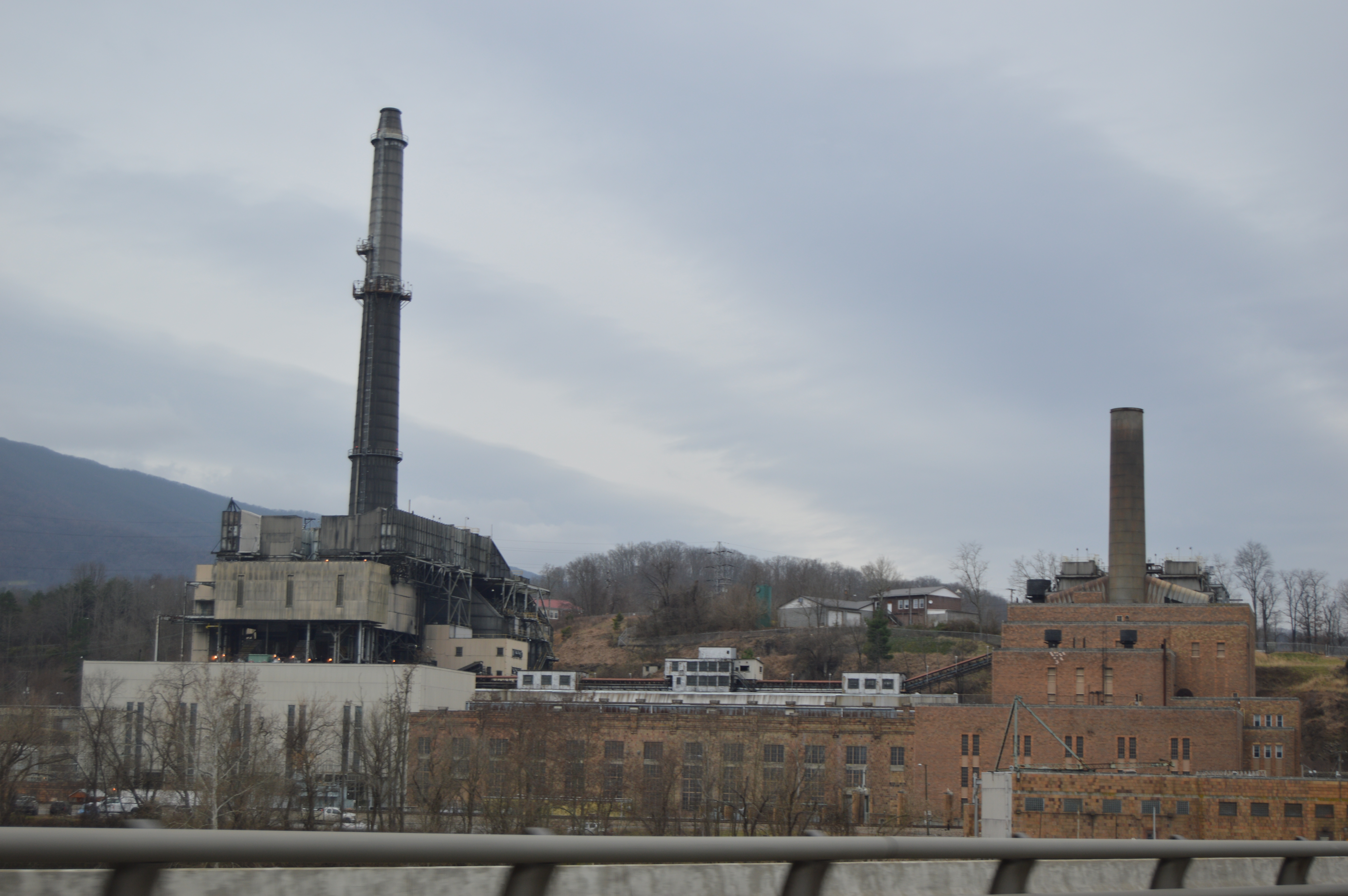
- Former Appalachian Power plant on the New River

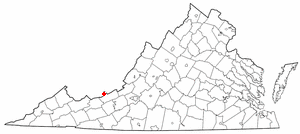
- Location of Glen Lyn, Virginia
- Coordinates: 37°22′23″N 80°51′39″W
- Country: United States
- State: Virginia
- County: Giles

Area
  - Total: 0.69 sq mi (1.8 km^{2})
  - Land: 0.61 sq mi (1.6 km^{2})
  - Water: 0.08 sq mi (0.21 km^{2})
- Elevation: 1,673 ft (510 m)

Population (2020)
  - Total: 95
  - Density: 160/sq mi (60/km^{2})
- Time zone: UTC-5 (Eastern (EST))
  - Summer (DST): UTC-4 (EDT)
- ZIP Code: 24093 (Glen Lyn)
- Area codes: 540 and 826
- FIPS code: 51-31376
- GNIS feature ID: 1483667

Glen Lyn is an unincorporated community in Giles County, Virginia, United States, at the confluence of the East and New rivers. Glen Lyn was incorporated as a town in 1926, and remained so until 2024 after its residents voted to dissolve the town's charter and become an unincorporated community. The population was 95 at the 2020 census. It is part of the Blacksburg-Christiansburg metropolitan area.

== History ==
Mr. John Toney built the first brick house in Giles County in 1780. Toney owned the land around his settlement and named the area Montreal. Over the years a post office was established giving Montreal a new name of Mouth of East River. Railroad workers of the Norfolk and Western Railway later gave it the name Hell’s Gate. The name changed once again to its current name, Glen Lyn, meaning lovely glen, after the railroad’s completion in 1883.

During the late 1800s, a few stores and a ferry were opened, however, the community did not experience any substantial growth until the construction of the Appalachian Power plant in 1919. This development increased the population of Glen Lyn from 50 to 400 people.

== Geography ==
Glen Lyn is located in northwestern Giles County at 37°22′23″N 80°51′39″W (37.373080, -80.860906), on both sides of the New River. It is bordered to the west by the East River and by the state of West Virginia. U.S. Route 460 passes through the town, leading east (upstream along the New River) 3 miles (5 km) to Rich Creek and west 15 miles (24 km) to Princeton, West Virginia. Pearisburg, the Giles County seat, is 12 miles (19 km) southeast (up the New River) via US 460, and Blacksburg is 34 miles (55 km) southeast.

According to the United States Census Bureau, Glen Lyn had a total area of 0.73 square miles (1.9 km^{2}), of which 0.66 square miles (1.7 km^{2}) are land and 0.1 square miles (0.2 km^{2}), or 12.22%, are water.

=== Climate ===
The climate in this area features moderate differences between highs and lows, and there is adequate rainfall year-round. According to the Köppen Climate Classification system, Glen Lyn has a marine west coast climate, abbreviated "Cfb" on climate maps.

== Demographics ==
Historical population
| Census | Pop. | Note | %± |
|---|---|---|---|
| 1930 | 274 | | — |
| 1940 | 259 | | −5.5% |
| 1950 | 240 | | −7.3% |
| 1960 | 222 | | −7.5% |
| 1970 | 191 | | −14.0% |
| 1980 | 235 | | 23.0% |
| 1990 | 170 | | −27.7% |
| 2000 | 151 | | −11.2% |
| 2010 | 115 | | −23.8% |
| 2020 | 95 | | −17.4% |
U.S. Decennial Census

=== 2020 census ===
As of the census of 2020, there were 95 people residing in the town. There were 51 housing units. The racial makeup of the town was 95.8% White, 0.0% African American or Black, 0.0% American Indian, 1.1% Asian, 0.0% Pacific Islander, 0.0% from other races, and 3.2% from two or more races. Hispanic or Latino of any race were 1.1% of the population.

=== 2010 census ===
As of the census of 2010, there were 115 people residing in the town. There were 58 housing units. The racial makeup of the town was 100.0% White. Hispanic or Latino of any race were 2.6% of the population.

=== 2000 census ===
As of the census of 2000, there were 151 people, 57 households, and 38 families living in the town. The population density was 233.1 people per square mile (89.7/km^{2}). There were 62 housing units at an average density of 95.7 per square mile (36.8/km^{2}). The racial makeup of the town was 100.00% White. Hispanic or Latino of any race were 0.66% of the population.

There were 57 households, out of which 36.8% had children under the age of 18 living with them, 54.4% were married couples living together, 12.3% had a female householder with no husband present, and 31.6% were non-families. 29.8% of all households were made up of individuals, and 15.8% had someone living alone who was 65 years of age or older. The average household size was 2.65 and the average family size was 3.36.

In the town, the population was spread out, with 27.8% under the age of 18, 11.3% from 18 to 24, 28.5% from 25 to 44, 15.9% from 45 to 64, and 16.6% who were 65 years of age or older. The median age was 35 years. For every 100 females there were 93.6 males. For every 100 females aged 18 and over, there were 78.7 males.

The median income for a household in the town was $28,750, and the median income for a family was $38,250. Males had a median income of $22,813 versus $18,750 for females. The per capita income for the town was $12,706. There were 10.8% of families and 17.7% of the population living below the poverty line, including 31.7% of under eighteens and 7.7% of those over 64.

== Parks and recreation ==
Glen Lyn Park, a public park maintained by the Giles County Parks and Recreation Department is located in the community. The park was previously maintained by the Town of Glen Lyn prior to dissolution. The park includes areas for camping, fishing, a boat ramp, go-cart track and a playground. It also has a paved walking trail.

== Culture ==
The Henry Reed Memorial Fiddlers Convention, which celebrates the legacy of the noted old-time musician Henry Reed (1884-1968), who was a resident of Glen Lyn, has been held each June since 2003.

== Government ==
Prior to the dissolution of the town in 2024, the last mayor and town manager was J. Howard Spencer.

The United States Postal Service operates the Glen Lyn Post Office within the community.

== Education ==
The community is served by Giles County Public Schools.

The closest higher education institutions are located in Blacksburg and Radford.

== Infrastructure ==
Water and sewer service is provided to the community by Giles County.

=== Public safety ===
Law enforcement is provided by the Giles County Sheriff's Office.

Fire protection is provided by the Rich Creek Fire Department in nearby Rich Creek. Emergency medical services are provided by the Giles Lifesaving and Rescue Squad. Previously, Glen Lyn Fire and Rescue provided fire protection to the community. The agency disbanded in 2024.

== Transportation ==
=== Air ===
The Mercer County Airport and New River Valley Airport are the closest general aviation airports to the community. The Greenbrier Valley Airport and Roanoke-Blacksburg Regional Airport are the closest airports with commercial service to the community.

=== Highways ===
- U.S. Route 460 (Virginia Avenue)

== Notable inhabitants ==
- Henry Reed (1884–1968), old-time fiddler and banjo player
