= Sarah Ogan Gunning =

American singer and songwriter (1910–1983)

- Born: Sarah Elizabeth Garland; June 28, 1910; Bell County, Kentucky
- Died: November 14, 1983 (aged 73); Knoxville, Tennessee
- Burial place: Hart, Michigan
- Occupation(s): Songwriter, folksinger
- Relatives: Aunt Molly Jackson (half-sister), Jim Garland (brother)

Sarah Ogan Gunning (June 28, 1910 – November 14, 1983) was an American singer and songwriter from the coal mining country of eastern Kentucky, as were her older half-sister Aunt Molly Jackson and her brother Jim Garland. Although she made an appearance in the New York folk music scene of the 1930s, she was overshadowed by her older brother and half-sister. Rediscovered in the 1960s while living in Detroit, she played at folk festivals at Newport in 1964 and the University of Chicago in 1965.

== Early life and family ==
She was born Sarah Elizabeth Garland on June 28, 1910, in Bell County, Kentucky. Her father was coal miner Oliver Perry Garland and her mother Sarah Elizabeth Lucas Garland, his second wife. He had earlier married Deborah Robinson Garland who bore four children, including Mary Magdalene Garland, later better known as Aunt Molly Jackson. After Deborah's death, Oliver married Sarah Lucas, and had eleven more children, including Jim Garland and Sarah Ogan Gunning. The children grew up with little formal education but with strong family ties and a rich tradition of songs and stories.

In 1925 the fifteen-year-old Sarah fell in love with Andrew Ogan, a twenty-year-old from Claiborne County, Tennessee, who had come to work in the Fox Ridge coal mine in Bell County, Kentucky. They eloped to Cumberland Gap to marry. They had four children, two of whom died of starvation during the Depression. Living conditions were bad in eastern Kentucky by 1931, and many miners responded to the retreat of the United Mine Workers by joining the communist-led National Miners Union (NMU). The ensuing violence and controversy pushed many NMU leaders and persons involved in union activity, including Ogan and her half-sister Aunt Molly Jackson, to leave the state.

By 1935 the Garlands and the Ogans had moved to New York City, with assistance from New York University folklorist Mary Elizabeth Barnicle. In New York, they met many leaders of the folksong revival, including Woody Guthrie, Pete Seeger, Burl Ives, Huddie Ledbetter, and Earl Robinson. But Andrew Ogan had TB, and when the illness worsened he moved back to Brush Creek in Knox County, Kentucky, where he died in August 1938. Sarah married Joseph Gunning, a skilled metal polisher, in August 1941. After the start of World War II they moved to work in the shipyard in Vancouver, Washington, where her brother Jim Garland had also found work. After the war they moved to Detroit, Michigan.

== Music career ==
Through contacts she made while living in New York, Sarah Ogan had a dozen of her songs recorded by Alan Lomax in 1937, and Professor Barnicle recorded Sarah singing duets with her brother Jim Garland in 1938 for the Library of Congress. Woody Guthrie wrote a profile of Sarah for the New York Daily Worker in 1940, and expanded his sketch for his American Folksong. She was also mentioned in the popular A Treasury of American Song. One of the well-known songs she wrote around 1936, "I am a Girl of Constant Sorrow," appeared in a 1953 collection, and was recorded in the 1960s by Peggy Seeger and Barbara Dane among others. The song is a rewrite of "Man of Constant Sorrow" that she remembered from a hillbilly record (likely recorded by Emry Arthur in 1928) she had heard some years before in the mountains, but the lyrics she wrote was considerably different from the original after the first verse.

Living in Detroit, Sarah was overlooked in the early stages of the American folk revival in the 1950s. In August 1963 folklorist Archie Green visited Sarah in Detroit to follow up interviews he had done with her half-sister Aunt Molly Jackson. Green joined forces with Wayne State University faculty Ellen Stekert and Oscar Paskal to record Sarah in January and March 1964 in the studios of WDET and the United Auto Workers Solidarity House. The Detroit sessions provided the selections for her album Girl of Constant Sorrow, Folk-Legacy FSA-26, issued in 1965. She was encouraged to sing publicly in Professor Stekert's classes and at a conference featuring Walter Reuther and Michael Harrington in Detroit in 1964. She sang at the Newport Folk Festival in the summer of 1964, and had her most extended performance at the University of Chicago Folk Festival in January 1965.

== Death ==
Sarah Gunning died during a family gathering in Knoxville, Tennessee on November 14, 1983, and was buried in Hart, Michigan, where she had lived since the mid-1960s.

== Selected discography ==
- Sarah Ogan Gunning, Girl Of Constant Sorrow (Folk-Legacy Records, 1965)

== Video documentary ==
- Mimi Pickering, "Dreadful Memories: The Life of Sarah Ogan Gunning, 1910-1983." Whitesburg, Kentucky: Appalshop, 1988, DVD, 38 minutes.
