= Harlan County War =

Violent labor dispute in Kentucky

- Part of the Coal Wars
- Date: 1931–1939
- Location: Harlan County, Kentucky, United States

Parties
Striking coal miners United Mine Workers	Mine operators Private guards Kentucky National Guard

Lead figures
Harry Simms	Sheriff J. H. Blair

Casualties and losses
Confirmed Deaths: 13	Deaths: 5

The Harlan County War, or Bloody Harlan, was a series of coal industry skirmishes, executions, bombings and strikes (both attempted and realized) that took place in Harlan County, Kentucky, during the 1930s. The incidents involved coal miners and union organizers on one side and coal firms and law enforcement officials on the other. The Harlan County coal miners campaigned and fought to organize their workplaces and better their wages and working conditions. It was a nearly decade-long conflict, lasting from 1931 to 1939. Before its conclusion, an unknown number of miners, deputies and bosses were killed, state and federal troops occupied the county more than half a dozen times, two acclaimed folk singers emerged, union membership oscillated wildly and workers in the nation's most anti-labor coal county were ultimately represented by a union.

== History ==
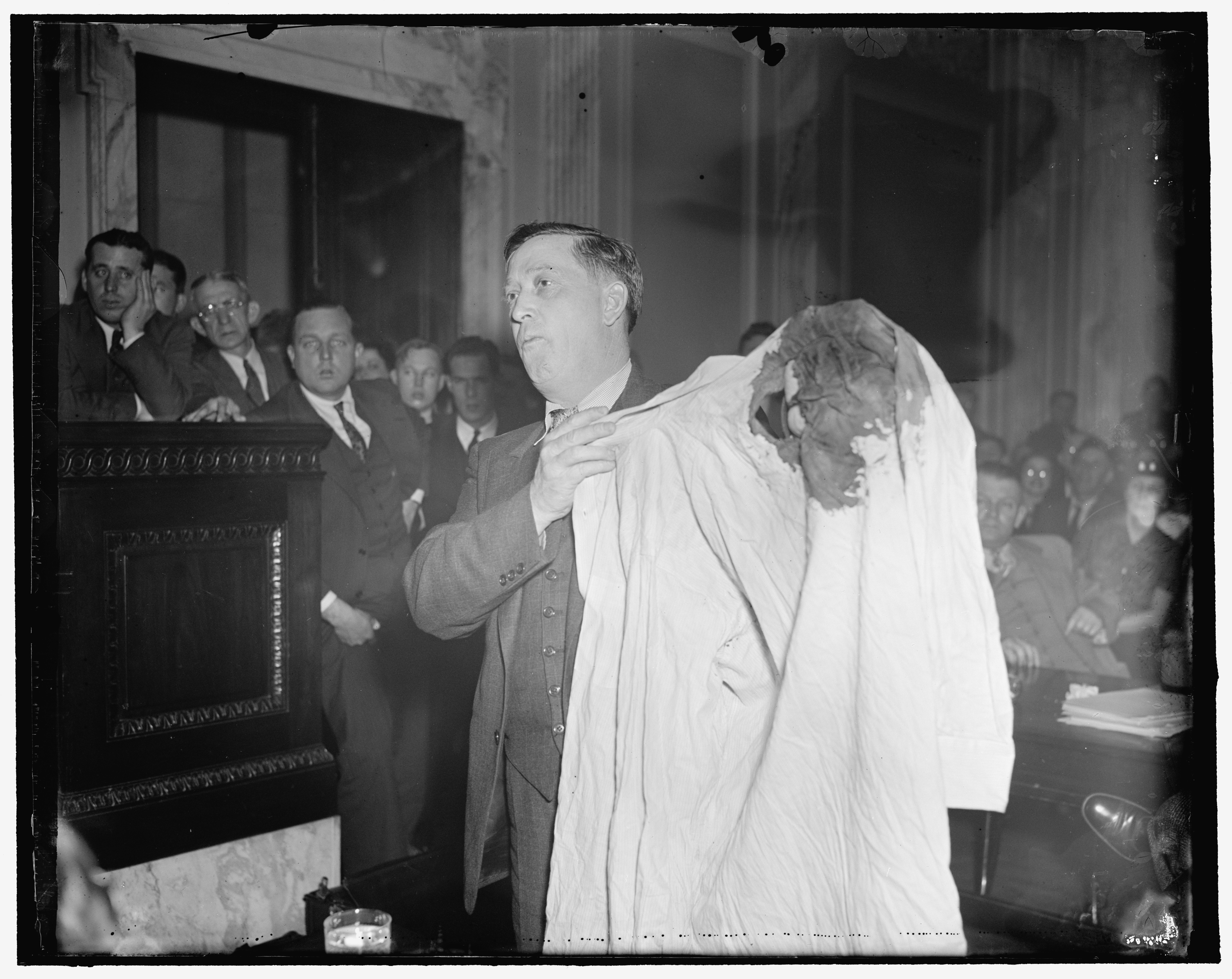
Testifying before the La Follette Civil Rights Committee in April 1937, a coal miner representing the union displays the bloody, bullet-torn undershirt he was wearing when he was shot by Harlan County deputy sheriffs.

On February 16, 1931, to maximize profits, the Harlan County Coal Operators' Association cut miners' wages by 10%. Reacting to the unrest created within Harlan's impoverished labor force, the United Mine Workers of America (UMW) attempted to organize the county's miners. Employees who were known by their bosses to be union members were fired and evicted from their company-owned homes. Before long, most of the remaining workforce had gone on strike in solidarity. Only three of Harlan's incorporated towns were not owned by mines; hungry and evicted workers and their families sought refuge in them, primarily in the town of Evarts. They found sympathy there with spurned politicians and business owners who wished to see the company stores vanish. At the peak of the first strike, 5,800 miners were idle and only 900 working. The strikebreakers were protected by private mine guards with full county deputy privileges, who were legally able to exercise their powers with impunity outside the walls of their employers. They operated under Sheriff J. H. Blair, a man who made his allegiance to the mine owners clear. He stated: "I did all in my power to aid the operators ... there was no compromise when labor troubles swept the county and the 'Reds' came to Harlan County". The citizens of Harlan, for their part, lost any illusions they may have held about impartiality in law enforcement. Songwriter Florence Reece reported,

Sheriff J. H. Blair and his men came to our house in search of Sam – that's my husband – he was one of the union leaders. I was home alone with our seven children. They ransacked the whole house and then kept watch outside, waiting to shoot Sam down when he came back. But he didn't come home that night. Afterward I tore a sheet from a calendar on the wall and wrote the words to 'Which Side Are You On?' to an old Baptist hymn, 'Lay the Lily Low'. My songs always goes to the underdog – to the worker. I'm one of them and I feel like I've got to be with them. There's no such thing as neutral. You have to be on one side or the other. Some people say, 'I don't take sides – I'm neutral.' There's no such thing. In your mind you're on one side or the other. In Harlan County there wasn't no neutral. If you wasn't a gun thug, you was a union man. You had to be.

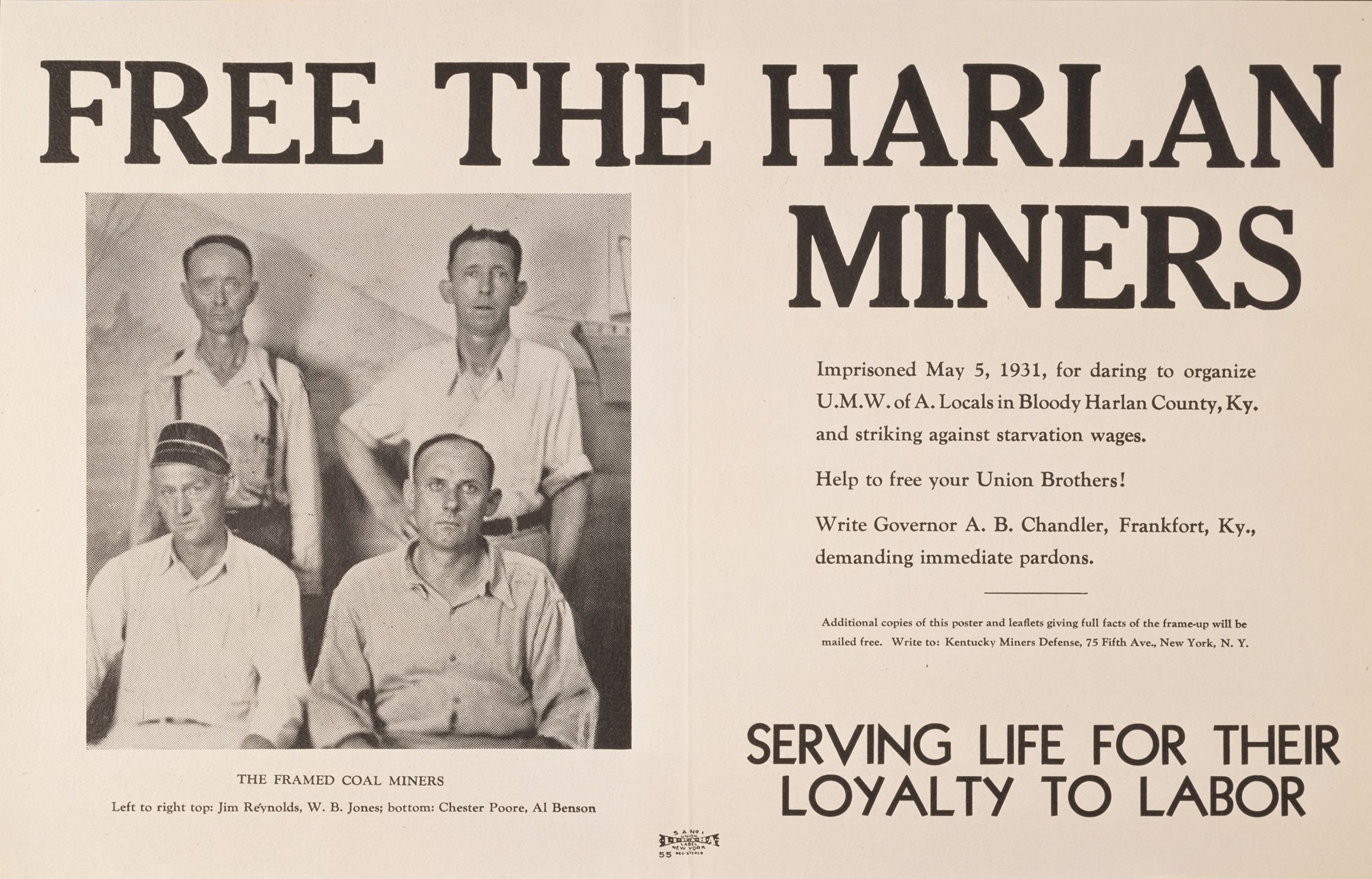
"FREE THE HARLAN MINERS," a poster issued by the Kentucky Miners' Defense on behalf of those arrested following the Battle of Evarts, 1931

Strikers exchanged gunfire with private guards and local law enforcement; strikebreakers were set upon and beaten. The most violent attack by mine workers occurred on May 5, 1931, and became known as the Battle of Evarts. The miners lay in ambush for cars delivering materials to strikebreakers and shot at them. Three company men and one striker were killed in the exchange.

The Kentucky National Guard was called in. The strikers expected protection but upon replacing deputized mine guards, the National Guard broke the picket lines instead. On May 24, a union rally was tear-gassed and Sheriff Blair rescinded county members' right to assemble. By June 17, the last mine had returned to work. No concessions were given by the mine operators and UMW membership plummeted.

In the wake of the UMW failure, the Communist National Miners Union (NMU) made a brief play for Harlan County. Though most workers felt disillusioned with organized labor, the NMU's radical ideology gained some support and ten local lodges sprang up before the Harlan County NMU was officially chartered. The smaller but more passionate NMU made greater relief efforts than the UMW, opening several soup kitchens in the county. Their attempts at strikes, while weak in surrounding counties, were utter failures in Harlan, where only a fraction of the workforce walked out in 1931 and 1932. Several events broke the NMU's foothold: local labor organizers, many of them clergy, learned of the Communist leadership's animosity toward religion and denounced the organization; Young Communist League organizer Harry Simms was killed in Harlan; the American Red Cross and local charities, who had been unwilling to take sides in a labor dispute, began giving aid to blacklisted miners who were unemployable as the NMU's financial troubles necessitated the closing of its soup kitchens.

Under the auspices of the National Industrial Recovery Act, which promoted the right to organize one's workplace and outlawed discrimination and firing based on union membership, approximately half of Harlan's coal mines, those in the Harlan County Coal Operators' Association, were run as open shops from October 27, 1933 – March 31, 1935. An open shop allows union membership but does not mandate it. Wages at these mines came into step with the rest of the nation. Despite headway by the unions, the battle for Harlan County between labor and capital continued. Sheriff Blair was voted out of office in 1933 and died in 1934, replaced by T. R. Middleton, a candidate who ran on a pro-union platform. The Kentucky National Guard was once again called in on December 8, 1934, requested by UMW organizers who had been threatened by bosses and deputies. The troops promptly escorted the union men to the county line. As national political support for the NIRA dwindled, capital gained the upper hand, and when the United States Supreme Court struck down the legislation's pro-union National Recovery Administration portion, shops with union presence in Harlan dwindled from eighteen to one.

Where the NIRA had been toothless in Harlan, the Wagner Act of 1935 proved itself a far greater thorn in the side of Harlan County's mine operators. It outlawed yellow-dog contracts, company unions, blacklists and discrimination on basis of union activity, all tactics employed by coal companies. While coal interests across the nation fell into step with the new legislation in 1935, Harlan was as resistant to federal meddling as it had ever been. On July 7, a group of deputies, enraged at a public celebration of the Wagner Act, dispersed the crowd by beating several miners. The year 1935 proved to be turbulent, even for Harlan; troops were deployed to maintain order in the county three times. On September 29, troops were dispatched on behalf of the miners for the first time in the Harlan County War, the governor referring to the beatings and harassment at the hands of the mine guards as "the worst reign of terror in the history of the county." He protected the miners despite the fact that a bomb had killed Harlan County Attorney Elmon Middleton several weeks earlier.

== Impact ==
Author and activist Theodore Dreiser conducted an investigation under the auspices of the National Committee for the Defense of Political Prisoners (NCDPP) of the American Communist Party. With contributions by John dos Passos, Samuel Ornitz and others, Dreiser produced a report called Harlan Miners Speak: Report on Terrorism in the Kentucky Coal Fields. The Dreiser Committee also discovered the labor folk singer Aunt Molly Jackson and her younger half-brother Jim Garland, putting them on a tour of 38 states to raise funds for the strikers. Florence Reece, wife of organizer Sam Reece, wrote the labor standard "Which Side Are You On?".

California labor activist Caroline Decker first became involved in union activities during the Harlan County War, when she and her sister participated in relief activities for striking miners. The 1976 documentary film Harlan County, USA, winner of the 1977 Academy Award for Best Documentary Feature, focuses on similar labor violence of the 1970s but refers to the 1930s violence as context. (Florence Reece appears in the film.) The 2000 television movie Harlan County War starred Holly Hunter.

== See also ==
- "Which Side Are You On?"
- Damnation (2017-2018 TV series)
- Murder of workers in labor disputes in the United States
- Coal Wars
- Mining in the United States
- Copper Country strike of 1913–1914
- Cripple Creek miners' strike of 1894
- West Virginia coal wars
- Illinois coal wars
- Colorado Labor Wars
- Molly Maguires
- Battle of Blair Mountain
- Coal strike of 1902
- List of incidents of civil unrest in the United States
- 2019 Harlan County coal miners protest
- Harlan County, USA (1976 documentary about the 1973 strike)
- Harlan County War (2000 film)
