= Herbert Halpert =

American anthropologist (1911–2000)

- Born: August 23, 1911; New York, United States
- Died: December 29, 2000 (aged 89); St. John's, Newfoundland and Labrador, Canada
- Occupations: anthropologist, folklorist
- Spouse: Violetta Maloney Halpert
- Children: Nicholas Halpert

Herbert Halpert (August 23, 1911 – December 29, 2000) was an American anthropologist and folklorist, specialised in the collection and study of both folk song and narrative.

== Biography ==
Herbert Norman Halpert's interest in folklore emerged in his adolescence and remained throughout his life. Consistent with his choice, he earned an M.A. in Anthropology from Columbia University, where he studied with Ruth Benedict and George Herzog, and a Ph.D. in English from Indiana University, under the guidance of Stith Thompson. Both of his dissertations were based on field studies of American folklore.

During World War II, Halpert served in the Alaskan Division of the Air Transport Command of the U.S. Army Air Corps. After the conflict, he became Professor and Head of the Department of English at Murray State College, in Kentucky, where he encouraged his students to collect local traditions. Between 1956 and 1960, he became Dean and Professor of English and Sociology at Blackburn College, in Illinois. In 1960, he was also visiting professor at the University of Arkansas and in the following year he moved to New York City, where he lived until 1962, teaching at the State University of New York.

In the autumn of 1962, Halpert became associate professor of English at the Memorial University of Newfoundland (Canada), where in 1968, he founded the Memorial University of Newfoundland Folklore and Language Archive (MUNFLA) and developed most of the work in folklore that became internationally renowned. Upon his death, the research contents from his office were donated to MUNFLA as the Herbert Halpert Research Collection under Accession Number 2012-037, and an award was established to fund the presentation of folklore research from that collection. Halpert's collection has been described as unique, as "it has been carefully preserved and catalogued, allowing others to interact with these books and Halpert's marginalia."

== Academic life ==
- M.A. in anthropology from Columbia University with the thesis "Folk Rhymes of New York City Children"
- Ph.D. in English from Indiana University with the thesis "Folktales and Legends of the New Jersey Pines: A Collection and Study"
- Visiting professor of the University of Arkansas
- Professor of English at the Memorial University of Newfoundland (1962–68) and of Folklore (1968-76)
- Professor Emeritus of Folklore at Memorial University of Newfoundland (1976- )

== Works (selected) ==
- 1937: Folk Tunes from Mississippi (with Arthur Palmer Hudson and George Herzog)
- 1939: Folk-Songs Mainly from West Virginia (with John Harrington Cox and George Herzog)
- 1957: The Talking Turtle and Other Ozark Folk Tales (illustrated by Glen Rounds)
- 1969: Christmas Mumming in Newfoundland; Essays in Anthropology, Folklore, and History (a study about the Christmas mumming and its typology)
- 1982: A Folklore Sampler From the Maritimes. With a Bibliographical Essay on the Folktale in English (a collection of folklore from the Canadian Maritimes)
- 1996: Folktales of Newfoundland (with J.D.A. Widdowson)
- 2002: Folklore: An Emerging Discipline. Selected Essays of Herbert Halpert (a selection of Herbert Halpert's essays on folklore)

=== About Halpert ===
- Kenneth S. Goldstein and Neil V. Rosenberg, eds. (1980). Folklore Studies in Honour of Herbert Halpert—A Festschrift

=== Discography ===
- Herbert Halpert New York City Collection (AFC 1938/002): folk songs collected by Halpert for the Federal Theatre Project between January, 1938-November, 1939.
- Herbert Halpert 1939 Southern States Recording Expedition (AFC 1939/005): songs and other records collected by Halpert for the Folk Arts Committee of the WPA and the Library of Congress between March–June, 1939
