= Robert Winslow Gordon =

American folklorist

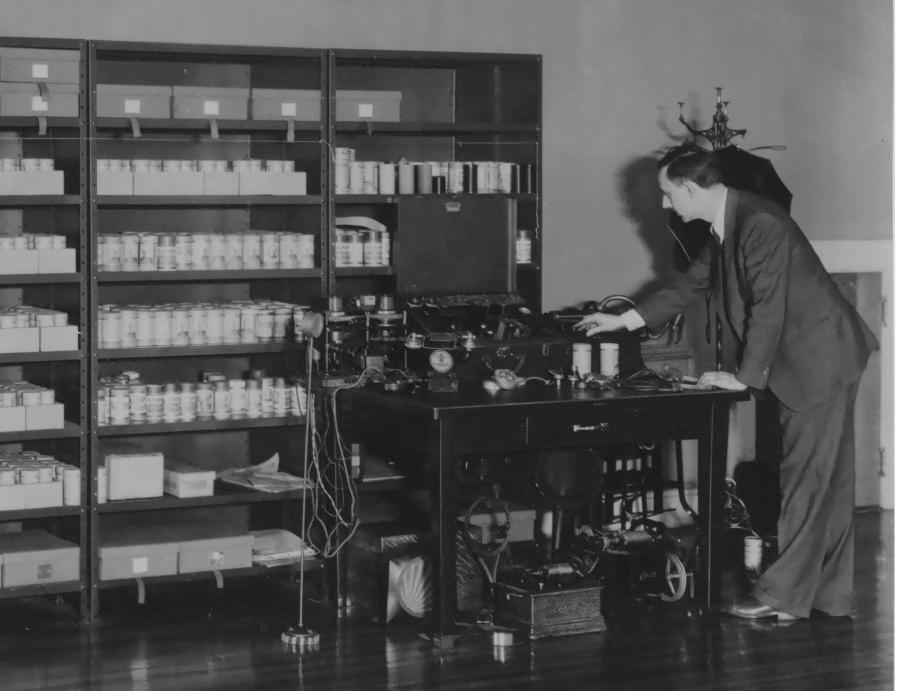
- Robert Winslow Gordon with Edison Cylinders
- Born: September 2, 1888; Bangor, Maine
- Died: March 26, 1961 (aged 72)
- Resting place: Darien, Georgia
- Education: Harvard University
- Occupation: folklorist
- Employer(s): University of California at Berkeley, Library of Congress

Robert Winslow Gordon (September 2, 1888 – March 26, 1961) was an American academic, known as a collector of folk songs.

Gordon was educated at Harvard University. He joined the English faculty at the University of California at Berkeley in 1918. In 1923, he was asked by Arthur Sullivant Hoffman to run the folk music column "Old Songs Men Have Sung" in Hoffman's magazine, Adventure. Gordon accepted and used the Adventure column to collect information on traditional American music from the magazine's readers.

Gordon was the founding head of the Archive of American Folk Song (later the Archive of Folk Culture, which became part of the American Folklife Center) at the Library of Congress in 1928. He was a pioneer in using mechanical means to document folk musicians, originally using Edison cylinder recordings. He is known among folk singers as the originator of the Gordon "Inferno" Collection of American songs; he also collected an early version of "Kumbaya".

From 1943 to 1958, Gordon was a Professor of English at George Washington University. He died March 26, 1961.

== Biography ==
- Kodish, Debora (1986). Good Friends and Bad Enemies: Robert Winslow Gordon and the Study of American Folksong. University of Illinois Press. ISBN 978-0-252-01251-8.
