= Violetta Maloney Halpert =

American folklorist (1919–2009)

Violetta Maloney Halpert (16 May 1919 – 30 May 2009), American folklorist, researcher, and U.S. Navy Veteran. Born Violetta (Letty) Goff Maloney, in Pottstown, Pennsylvania, she was instrumental in the development of university folklore collections in Canada.

== Military career ==
In 1941, she became one of the first women to enlist in the U.S. Navy, eventually joining the newly-formed WAVES. As Ensign with the Office of Naval Procurement, one of her duties was to work as a recruitment officer, giving presentations at colleges about "the duties of women serving in the WAVES... information on requirements for enlistment, what abilities are most in demand in the WAVES, and where and how they are trained." She rose to the rank of Lieutenant and saw active duty as both a Supply Officer and in Recruitment until 1945, remaining in the Reserves until her honourable discharge in 1951.

== Folklore research ==
Halpert studied English at Wilson College in Pennsylvania and did a masters degree in folk literature at Indiana University in Bloomington. There, she completed additional graduate work in Folklore, studying under Stith Thompson, author of the Motif-Index of Folk Literature, as well as studying under ethnomusicologist George Herzog. It was at Indiana, in 1940, that she met Herbert Halpert, one of Thompson's doctoral students, and they were married during the war. Their son, Nicholas Theodore Halpert, was born in Kentucky on 16 February 1949.

In the spring of 1942, she worked on editing the first issue of the Hoosier Folklore Bulletin. In the 1950s, she chronicled folkloric works in progress for the Journal of American Folklore and researched a variety of genres, including folk cures, skipping rhymes, songs and dances, and death beliefs. She also worked briefly as a journalist for a weekly newspaper in Carlinville, Illinois.

She and her professor–husband went to Memorial University in St. John's, Newfoundland, Canada, in 1962. There, she worked in the Acquisitions Department of the Queen Elizabeth II Library and pursued her interest in folk literature. At the library, Halpert was "instrumental in acquiring books and materials to make the university's folklore collection the best in Canada"

In 1968, Herbert and Violetta Halpert founded the Memorial University of Newfoundland and Folklore and Language Archive (MUNFLA) which "they developed as an integral part of the research and teaching functions of the Department of Folklore." During the same time period, she worked as a Library Assistant at the university library. At MUNFLA, she compiled and organized student manuscripts for use of researchers and created finding tools. With her husband, she devised and refined a comprehensive classification of genres of folklore, which "not only contributed to the structure of folklore courses taught at Memorial, but also formed the basis for systems of accessioning and data retrieval in MUNFLA." Violetta often worked behind the scenes, editing her husband's scholarly work and collecting and cataloguing materials, books, and tales:

[Herbert] Halpert was... not a prolific author in the manner of many of his generation, partly because of his desire to find every possible reference to a work and to incorporate it usefully into his text, and also because he was rarely satisfied with the editing of his own work. This explains why many of his articles and books were co-authored or received editorial attention from a colleague or from his wife, Violetta Maloney Halpert.

The 1985 volume of the journal Culture & Tradition was dedicated to Violetta Halpert in recognition of her contribution to Folklore.

After her husband's death, she donated her husband’s and her own huge personal collections, containing over 13,000 monographs and journal titles, to the archives at Memorial University. Shortly before her ninetieth birthday, she was informed by the Executive of the Folklore Studies Association of Canada that she was to be awarded the Marius Barbeau Medal for her lifelong contribution to Canadian Folklore and Ethnology, an award which she received in 2009.

== Death ==
Halpert died on 30 May 2009 in St. John’s at the age of 90. She was memorialized for "her sharp intellect, sense of humor, and indomitable will" and is remembered for her contributions as a collector of "the 'lore'—the knowledges and wisdoms—of local and regional societies."

== Prizes ==
Three prizes are named in her honour:

- Violetta “Letty” Halpert Paper Prize – given to the best student paper delivered at the annual conference of the Folklore Studies Association of Canada.
- Herbert and Violetta Halpert Travel Research Award – given annually to a full-time student in the MA or PhD program in folklore at Memorial University to fund costs relating to national/international travel for the presentation of folklore research utilizing the MUNFLA Collections.
- The Herbert and Violetta Halpert Writing Prizes in Children's Studies - given for the most outstanding piece of writing by Children's Studies majors or minors at York University.

== Select bibliography ==
- "The Hobo Song." Hoosier Folklore, Vol. 1(1942): 101–102.
- "Jumping Rope Rhymes from Burley, Idaho," Hoosier Folklore, Vol. 3 (1944): 24–25.
- "Indiana Wart Cures". Hoosier Folklore, Vol. 8, No. 2/3 (Jun. – Sep., 1949): 37–43.
- "Folk Cures from Indiana." Hoosier Folklore, Vol. 9, No. 1 (Jan. – Mar., 1950): 1–12.
- "Death Beliefs from Indiana." Midwest Folklore, Vol. 2, No. 4 (Winter, 1952): 205–219.
- "Collectors and Students of Folksong, U. S. A." Southern Folklore Quarterly, Vol. 17, (Jan 1, 1953): 167.
- "Flora L. McDowell, 'Folk Dances of Tennessee'" (Book Review) Midwest Folklore, Vol. 5, Iss. 4, (Winter 1955): 242.
- "Smoked Corpses." Western Folklore, Vol. 18, No. 1 (Jan., 1959): 50.
- "Place name stories about West Kentucky towns." Kentucky Folklore Record, Vol. 7, No. 3 (1961):103.
- Neither Heaven Nor Hell. St. John's: Memorial University of Newfoundland Department of Folklore, 1979.
- "Death Warnings in Newfoundland Oral Traditions." Studies in Newfoundland Folklore: Community and Process, 1991.
- Folk Tales, Tall Tales, Trickster Tales, and Legends of the Supernatural from the Pinelands of New Jersey, written by Herbert Halpert, edited by J. D. A. Widdowson, Violetta M. Halpert and Carl Withers.
- Halpert, Violetta Maloney; Swift, Lucie; and Spence, Dorothy Clark, "Jackson Purchase - Place Names" (1961). County Histories of Kentucky. 343.
