= Charles Lafayette Todd =

American folklorist

Charles Lafayette "Lafe" Todd (December 9, 1911 – August 4, 2004) was an American folklorist.

He was born in rural western New York State. As an undergraduate studying English literature at Hamilton College, he developed an interest in the Elizabethan ballad. In the late 1930s, while doing graduate work at Columbia University in New York City, Todd lived in Greenwich Village, where he frequented the Village Vanguard, a local night spot. Here he made the acquaintance of Alan Lomax (who later facilitated the Archive of American Folk Song's support of the Todd/Sonkin collecting expedition), along with other notables of the day such as Woody Guthrie, Huddie Ledbetter (better known as "Leadbelly"), Burl Ives, John Jacob Niles, and Frank M. Warner.

During the same period, Todd met Robert Sonkin. They were both working in the Department of Public Speaking at the City College of New York, where Todd taught for three years. They undertook their documentation in the California FSA camps during their summer vacations in 1940 and 1941. In addition to the ethnographic research Todd did with Sonkin in California, he also documented folk music in upstate New York and parts of New Jersey. In 1942, he returned to California and worked as associate manager of the Tulare Migrant Camp in Visalia. During his tenure at Tulare many of the men in camp left to assist in the war effort, either by working in the San Francisco shipyards or by joining the military. He was later drafted into the army and went to work as a public relations officer.

After the end of World War II, Todd continued his career in public relations, including a stint with the State Department doing Cold War broadcasts to Iron Curtain countries. He later went on to become president of an international public relations firm in New York. Ultimately, he became head of the Speech and Communications Department at his alma mater, Hamilton College. Todd and Sonkin once again undertook a collaborative project during this period, which resulted in a book titled Alexander Bryan Johnson: Philosophical Banker, published in 1977.

Todd and his wife, Clare, retired to Vero Beach, Florida.
