= Aunt Molly Jackson =

American folk singer and union activist (1880–1960)

Aunt Molly Jackson

Aunt Molly Jackson (1880 – September 1, 1960) was an influential American folk singer and a union activist. Her full name was Mary Magdalene Garland Stewart Jackson Stamos.

== Biography ==
Jackson was one of fifteen children born in Clay County, Kentucky, as the daughter of Oliver Perry Garland and Deborah Robinson. Prior to 1883, her father worked as a sharecropper. However, due to the extensive subdivision of land in southeastern Kentucky over the course of the latter half of the nineteenth century, her father's profession grew to be inviable. The family moved to East Bernstadt, Kentucky in Laurel County where Oliver opened a general store selling groceries to miners on credit and became a pastor at the Missionary Baptist Church in town. When the miners failed to make their payments, he was forced to close the store two years later to go to work in the coal mines. Her mother died of tuberculosis when she was six years old. Her father later became a union organizer, which Jackson has said, particularly after her father's death, strongly influenced her work as an activist during her adulthood. After scaring a neighbor on purpose by applying blackface, Jackson was jailed at the age of ten. She began learning songs from her great-grandmother, Nancy MacMahan, at an early age.

In 1894, she married the miner Jim Stewart. She bore two children. For the next decade, she worked as a nurse in Clay County before moving to Harlan County in 1908 and a job as a midwife delivering 884 babies. Her husband was killed in a mine accident in 1917 and shortly afterwards, she married the miner Bill Jackson. Tragedies struck her family when her father and a brother were blinded in another mine accident. She became a member of the United Mine Workers and began writing protest songs such as "I Am A Union Woman", "Kentucky Miner's Wife", and "Poor Miner's Farewell". When Jackson was jailed because of her unionizing activities, her husband was forced to divorce her in order to keep his mining job.

She was discovered in November 1931 by the Dreiser Committee, investigating the Harlan County War and workers' living conditions when she spoke and sang her song "Ragged, Hungry Blues" in front of the committee. In December 1931, Jackson traveled to New York City to support and raise money for striking Harlan coal miners, at one point appearing before an estimated crowd of 21,000 at the Bronx Coliseum. Jackson made her recording debut on December 10, 1931. For the next year, she performed in various cities in the north. She stayed in New York for much of that decade and was a part of the Greenwich Village folk revival, singing for Alan Lomax at the Library of Congress, and influencing folk singers from Woody Guthrie to Pete Seeger.

In the mid-1930s, she performed in New York City together with Woody Guthrie, Pete Seeger, Earl Robinson, Will Geer, her half-brother Jim Garland, and her half-sister Sarah Ogan Gunning. After a bus accident in Ohio, leaving her badly crippled, Jackson became incapacitated and was confined to her New York apartment. She died in 1960 and was interred as Mary Stamos, next to her husband Gust Stamos, at the Odd Fellows Lawn Cemetery in Sacramento, California.

The given dates of Aunt Molly Jackson's life are mostly uncertain since she was inconsistent when giving them. Folklorist Archie Green became very frustrated during interviews with her, due to her "elastic responses", inconsistent elaborations and "flexible dates." It was not unusual for her to contradict her own prior accounts.

== Discography ==
- Kentucky Miner's Wife, Part 1-2 (Ragged Hungry Blues) - Columbia 15731-D (1931)
- The Little Dove / Ten Thousand Miles - Library of Congress AAFS-7 (1942)
- The Songs and Stories of Aunt Molly Jackson, 1960 - Folkways FH-5457 (1961)
- Aunt Molly Jackson, Library of Congress Recordings, 1939 - Rounder 1002 (1971)
