= Robert Sonkin =

Robert Sonkin (1910 – 1980) was an American scholar of speech, language, and music.

== Life ==
Sonkin was born into an Orthodox Jewish family in the Bronx, New York, on December 25, 1910. Sonkin, who held degrees from City College (CCNY) (now the City College of the City University of New York [CUNY]) and Columbia University, founded the speech clinic at City College. He met Charles L. Todd while they were both working in the Department of Public Speaking at City College in the late 1930s. In addition to doing ethnographic research with Todd in California, Sonkin also documented the African American community of the town of Gee's Bend, Alabama, where other Farm Security Administration (FSA) work was being carried out. After the onset of World War II, Sonkin participated in an Archive of American Folk Song-sponsored project to document the man-in-the-street's opinion of the war effort. Like Todd, Sonkin was drafted into the military during World War II, where he served in the Army Signal Corps.

At the end of the war, Sonkin returned to City College and became professor of speech. In 1977, collaborators Todd and Sonkin jointly published a biography of Alexander Bryan Johnson.

Sonkin retired from CUNY in 1976 and became professor emeritus. He died May 26, 1980, at the age of sixty-nine.
