= MUNFLA =

Largest sound recording folklore archive in Canada

MUNFLA (Memorial University of Newfoundland Folklore and Language Archive) is the largest sound recording folklore archive in Canada. It is hosted at Memorial University of Newfoundland, located in the G.A. Hickman Building at the St. John's campus in Newfoundland, Canada. It is a member of the Canadian Council of Archives and the Association of Newfoundland and Labrador Archives. MUNFLA was founded in 1968 by folklorist Herbert Halpert, head of the Folklore Department, and his wife, researcher-librarian Violetta Maloney Halpert, as a joint-venture by the Folklore and English departments at Memorial University. The archive was created as a repository for recordings and material culture of Newfoundland and Labrador folk culture.

== Collection ==
The archive contains a variety of items including oral histories, songs, poetry, childlore, folk narratives, personal experience narratives, folk beliefs as well as student research papers and graduate theses and dissertations from the Department of Folklore.
