= Jim Garland =

American miner and songwriter (1905 - 1978)

Jim Garland (April 8, 1905 – September 6, 1978) was an American miner, songwriter, folksinger, and folk song collector from the coal mining country of eastern Kentucky, where he was involved with the communist-led National Miners Union (NMU) during the violent labor conflicts of the early 1930s called the Harlan County War.

Garland came to New York City in 1931 with his older half-sister Aunt Molly Jackson and later followed by sister Sarah Ogan where he participated in the Greenwich Village folk music scene. Two of his best-known songs are "The Death of Harry Simms" and "I Don't Want Your Millions, Mister."

During World War II he moved, together with Sarah's family, to Vancouver, Washington, to work in the shipyard. In 1944 he founded a broom factory which he ran for many years. Garland sang at the Newport Folk Festival in 1963 and can be seen in documentary film footage seated behind and to the right of Bob Dylan as Dylan performs. His sister Sarah Ogan Gunning sang there in 1964. Also, Mr. Garland was a participant at the 1971 and 1974 Smithsonian American Folklife Festivals, held in Washington, D.C.

Mr. Garland submitted various reel-to-reel tape recordings of himself, his daughter Betty, friends, neighbors and local church congregations to Folkways Records, Inc. The tapes have been retained, and are archived in the Ralph Rinzler Folklife Archives and Collections of the Smithsonian Center for Folklife and Cultural Heritage. Folkways Records never released any recordings of Jim Garland himself; however, in 1964, Folkways Records issued an LP recording of his daughter, Betty Garland, which was devoted to the Garland family folksong repertory. The album remains available from Smithsonian/Folkways Recordings.
