= Alexander Bryan Johnson =

United States philosopher and banker

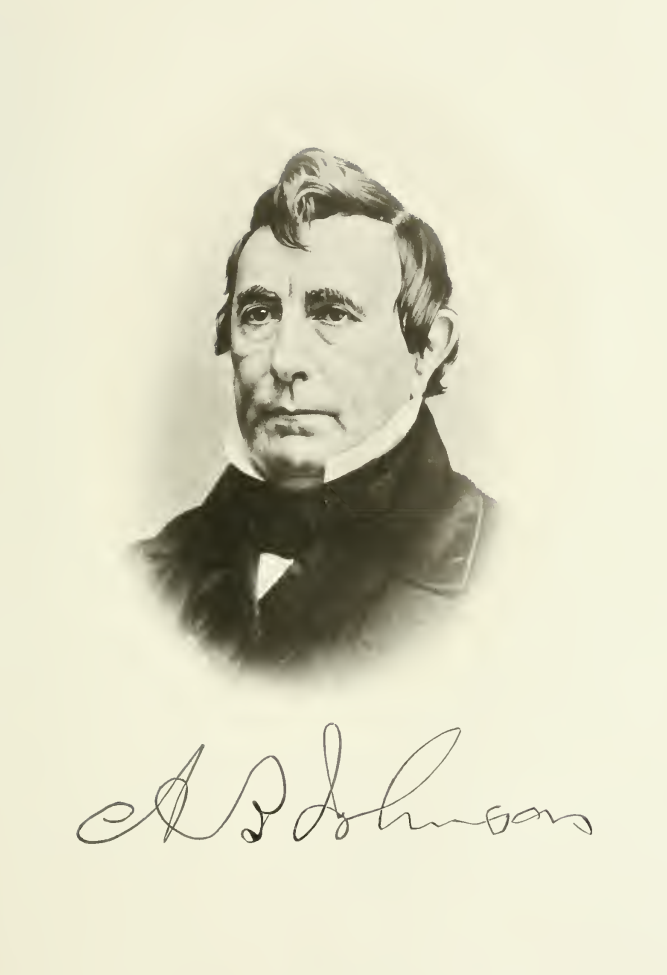
Bust of Alexander Bryan Johnson with Signature

Alexander Bryan Johnson (May 29, 1786, Gosport, Hampshire, Eng. — September 9, 1867, Utica, N.Y., U.S.), was a British-born American philosopher and semanticist. He immigrated to the United States as a child and worked as a banker in Utica, New York. He wrote about economics, language, and the nature of knowledge.

== Biography ==
Of Netherlandic and Jewish ancestry, he was born in Gosport, Hampshire, England, United Kingdom and at age 16 he emigrated to the United States, and settled at Utica, where he was a banker for many years. He was admitted to the bar, but never practised.

Johnson died on the 9th of September 1867, at the age of 81, and was buried at Forest Hill Cemetery in Utica.

== Family ==
He married Abigail Louisa Smith Adams (1798-1836), daughter of Charles Adams and Sally Smith, niece of William Stephens Smith, and granddaughter of John Adams and Abigail Adams.

His son, Alexander Smith Johnson, was born in Utica in 1817, served as a judge, and died in Nassau, Bahamas, in 1878.

== Philosophy ==
From his youth he had given all his leisure to the study of problems in intellectual philosophy, and especially of the relations between knowledge and language. He attempted to show the ultimate meaning of words, apart from their meaning as related to each other in ordinary definition, and thus to ascertain the nature of human knowledge as it exists independent of the words in which it is expressed.

His 1836 work, A Treatise on Language, was little recognised in his own time, and this remained the case for nearly a century after his death. It can now be seen to have anticipated the thrust of logical positivism, at least in arguing that misunderstandings of how language operates bedevil philosophical questions, and theories of modern linguistics.

== Writings ==
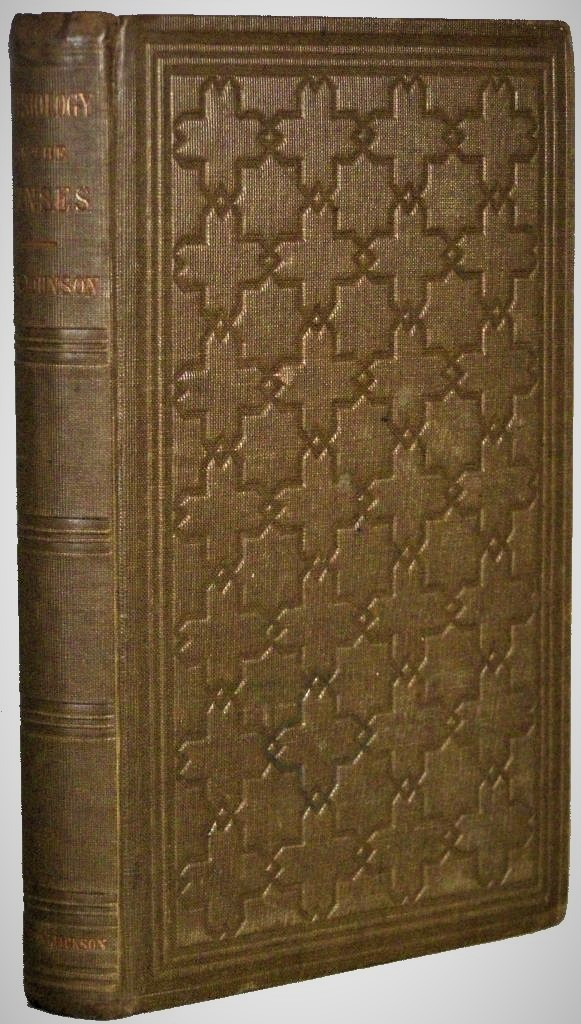
Physiology Of The Senses - First Edition

Alexander Bryan Johnson was a prolific writer considering that his primary occupation was banking and finance. He published 10 books over his lifetime and a myriad of political articles and pamphlets regarding the public speeches and lectures he gave. Moses Bagg, a contemporary biographer and colleague of Johnson's reflects, "that a man thrown early into the active, and what with most men would necessarily be the absorbing business of life, should accomplish so much in literature, and accomplish it so well is indeed extraordinary."

"The great and prominent study of his life was language with reference to its meaning in something other than words." Much of Johnsons work was published as reiterations throughout his life. His seminal philosophical work was further revised, compressed and republished under the title Treatise on Language, or the Relation which Words bear to Things in 1836. Johnson's description of The Meaning of Words reads, "Four Ineradicable fallacies are concealed in the structure of language: it identifies what unverbaly are diverse, assimilates what unverbaly are heterogeneous, makes a unit of what unverbaly are multifarious, and transmutes into each other what unverbaly are untransmutable."

Johnson was autodidactic by nature and gained proficiency in multiple areas of study. Though philosophy was his most keen subject of interest, much of his intellectual effort was spent in other realms. His primary employment with banking and finance naturally absorbed his analytical attention leading him to publish on an array of financial topics. The collection of his banking related publications includes A Treatise on Banking, 1850, The Philosophy of Joint-Stock Banking, 1851 and Our Monetary Condition, 1864. Johnson was also deeply engaged with politics and even moral philosophy. He prided himself as an upstanding citizen and valued exacting moral judgment. Many of Johnsons published works were structured as guides to the proper moral and intellectual education of young men. His Religion in its Relation to the Present Life, published in 1840, sought to elucidate how proper conduct can benefit ones life and how one could utilize the art of self control.

== See also ==
- American philosophy
- List of American philosophers
- Semantics
