= American Folklife Center =

Research center

- Location: Washington, D.C., United States
- Type: Research center
- Scope: To preserve and present American Folklife
- Established: 1976

Collection
- Items collected: All aspects of folklore and folklife worldwide
- Size: 6 million

Other information
- Parent organization: Library of Congress
- Website: www.loc.gov/folklife/

The American Folklife Center at the Library of Congress in Washington, D.C. was created by Congress in 1976 "to preserve and present American Folklife". The center includes the Archive of Folk Culture, established at the library in 1928 as a repository for American folk music. The center and its collections have grown to encompass all aspects of folklore and folklife worldwide.

== Collections ==
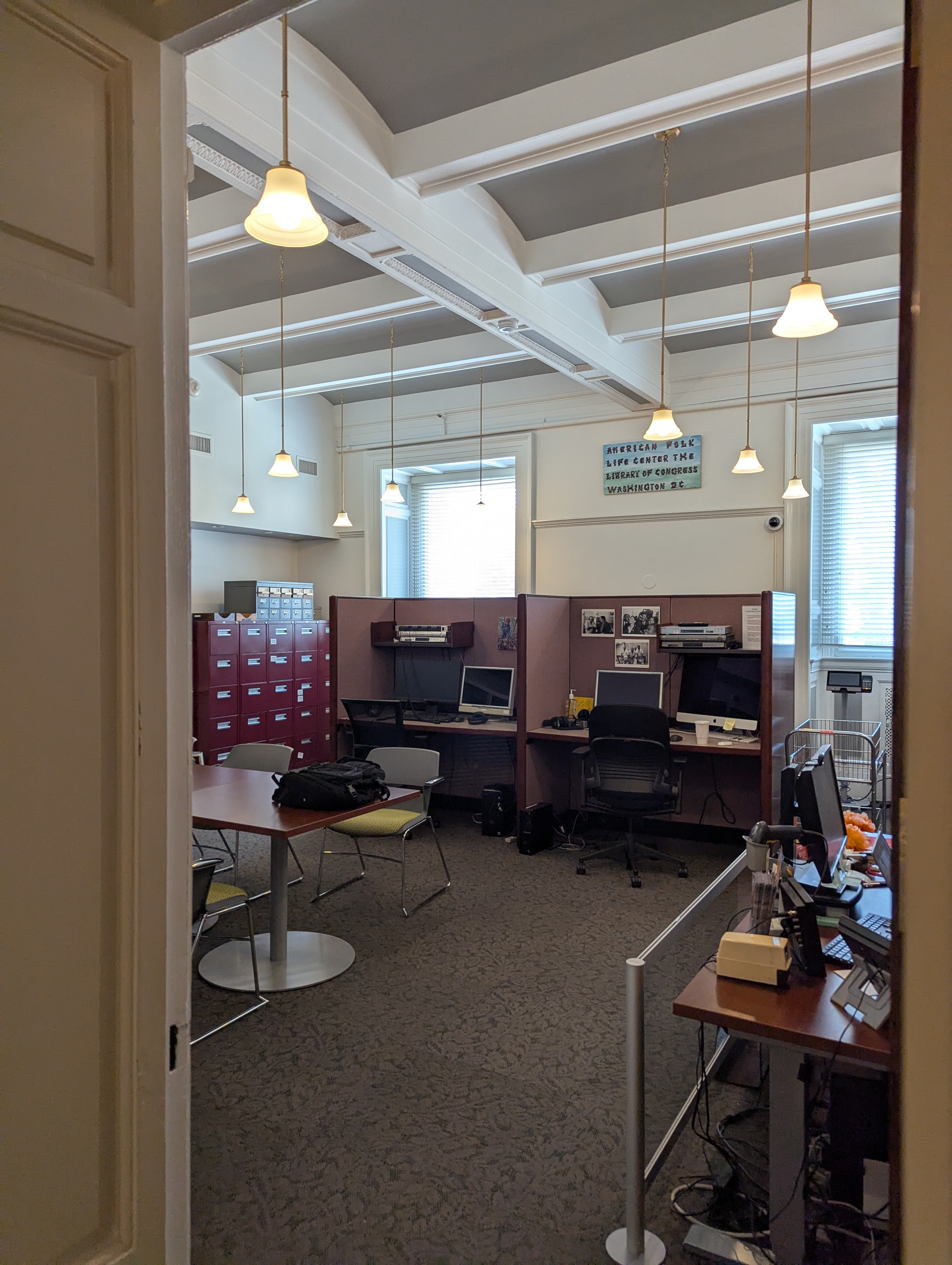
Offices of the American Folklife Center at the Thomas Jefferson Building

The 20th century has been called the age of documentation. Folklorists and other ethnographers have taken advantage of each succeeding technology, from Thomas Edison's wax-cylinder recording machine (invented in 1877) to the latest digital audio equipment, to record the voices and music of many regional, ethnic, and cultural groups in the United States and around the world. Much of this documentation has been assembled and preserved in the center's Archive of Folk Culture, which founding head Robert Winslow Gordon called "a national project with many workers". Today the center is working on digital preservation, Web access, and archival management.

The center's archive has about 6 million items, 400,000 of which are sound recordings.

The center's collections include American folk music and folklife recordings collected by John Lomax and his son Alan Lomax; Native American song and dance; ancient English ballads; the tales of "Bruh Rabbit", told in the Gullah dialect of the Georgia Sea Islands; the stories of ex-slaves, told while still vivid in their minds; an Appalachian fiddle tune heard on concert stages around the world; a Cambodian wedding in Lowell, Massachusetts; a Saint Joseph's Day Table tradition in Pueblo, Colorado; Balinese Gamelan music recorded shortly before the Second World War; documentation from the lives of cowboys, farmers, fishermen, coal miners, shop keepers, factory workers, quilt makers, professional and amateur musicians, and housewives from throughout the U.S., first-hand accounts of community events from every state; and international collections.

The images, sounds, written accounts, moving image recordings, and more items of cultural documentation are available to researchers at the center's Archive of Folk Culture and through online presentations on the Library's web site. There, more than 4,000 collections, assembled over the years from "many workers", embody American traditional life and the cultural life of communities from many regions of the world. Collections in the archive include material from all 50 states, United States trusts, territories and the District of Columbia. Most of these areas have been served by the center's cultural surveys, equipment loan program, publications and other projects.

== Structure ==
According to its establishing statue, the Center is established within the Library of Congress. The Center is administered by a Director, and is overseen by a thirteen-member Board of Trustees. The third director of the American Folklife Center was Elizabeth "Betsy" Peterson. In 2022, Nicole Saylor was appointed as the fourth director of the American Folklife Center.

== See also ==
- Gordon "Inferno" Collection
- StoryCorps, an American Folklife Center Special Project
- Veterans History Project of the Library of Congress American Folklife Center, an American Folklife Center Special Project
