= Sky Blue (Townes Van Zandt album) =

Studio album by Townes Van Zandt
- Released: March 7, 2019
- Recorded: Atlanta, Georgia, 1973
- Length: 34:11
- Label: TVZ Records, Fat Possum Records

Townes Van Zandt chronology
Sunshine Boy: The Unheard Studio Sessions & Demos 1971–1972 (2013)	Sky Blue (2019)

Sky Blue is a posthumous album by Texas singer and songwriter Townes Van Zandt, recorded in 1973 but not released until 2019. All tracks were recorded in early 1973 at the Atlanta, Georgia, home studio of Bill Hedgepeth, a journalist, musician, and longtime friend of Van Zandt. Its 2019 release was conceived by Townes' surviving family—his wife and literary executor Jeanene, along with his children, J.T., Will, and Katie Bell.

== Tracks ==
Sky Blue consists of 11 previously unreleased recordings, including two tracks which had never been released, "All I Need" and "Sky Blue." The album also features three covers, the traditional folk song "Hills of Roane County", Richard Dobson's "Forever For Always For Certain", and Tom Paxton's "The Last Thing on My Mind". There are three original tracks which had been released on previous albums; a version of "Blue Ridge Mountains Blues (Smokey Version)" titled simply "Blue Ridge Mountains" first appeared on Townes' 1972 album High, Low, and in Between. Recordings of "Pancho and Lefty" and "Silver Ships of Andilar" had initially appeared on his 1972 album The Late Great Townes Van Zandt. A recording of "Rex's Blues" was included in Van Zandt's 1977 live album Live at the Old Quarter and on 1978's Flyin' Shoes. "Snake Song" was also released on Flyin' Shoes. "Dream Spider" (as "The Spider Song") would not be released until 1993 as part of The Nashville Sessions, a collection of recordings intended to be on his seventh album, Seven Come Eleven.

== Critical reception ==
Sky Blue received positive reviews from critics noted at review aggregator Metacritic. It has a weighted average score of 79 out of 100, based on 10 reviews. Writing for Pitchfork, Stephen Thomas Erlewine gave the release a 6.9 out of 10. Jim Allen of NPR considers it a document of Van Zandt's best work. Fred Thomas of the editorial staff of AllMusic gave the album four out of five stars, with reviewer Fred Thomas writing that "glimmers of brilliance" can be heard on it. In Rolling Stone, Jonathan Bernstein gave the album 3.5 out of five stars. Elisabeth Woronzoff of PopMatters gave it a positive review in light of the artist's enigmatic career, as did Matt Mellis of Consequence.

== Track listing ==
All lyrics and music by Townes Van Zandt except where noted.

1. "All I Need" – 2:52
2. "Rex's Blues" – 2:15
3. "The Hills of Roane County" (traditional) – 3:53
4. "Sky Blue" – 2:34
5. "Forever, for Always, for Certain" (Richard Dobson) – 2:28
6. "Blue Ridge Mountain Blues" (Smoky Version) – 2:58
7. "Pancho and Lefty" – 3:54
8. "Snake Song" – 2:08
9. "Silver Ships of Andilar" – 5:30
10. "Dream Spider" – 1:57
11. "The Last Thing on My Mind" (Tom Paxton) – 3:42
