= Sunshine Boy: The Unheard Studio Sessions & Demos 1971–1972 =

Studio album by Townes Van Zandt
- Released: 2013
- Recorded: New York City, 1971; Los Angeles, 1971; Nashville, 1972
- Label: Omnivore
- Producer: Cheryl Pawelski

Townes Van Zandt chronology
Houston 1988: A Private Concert (2005)	Sunshine Boy: The Unheard Studio Sessions & Demos 1971–1972 (2013)	Sky Blue (2019)

Sunshine Boy: The Unheard Studio Sessions & Demos 1971–1972 is an album by Townes Van Zandt. It was released posthumously in 2013.

== Background ==
Sunshine Boy collects alternate takes, cover songs and demos from what many believe to be Van Zandt's most productive period, culminating in 1972 with the release of two heralded albums: High, Low and In Between and The Late Great Townes Van Zandt. Disc one contains alternate takes of several compositions, such as his classic "Pancho and Lefty", which is stripped of the strings and mariachi horns that augmented the original, and "White Freight Liner Blues," which contains southern rock elements. The second disc contains intimate demos mainly featuring Van Zandt and just his guitar, an approach many believe to be ideal for his poetic, often sad songs.

Sunshine Boy has received positive reviews from critics. Fred Thomas of AllMusic writes, "Though all of the songs on Sunshine Boy found their way to official albums in more fleshed-out versions, these uncluttered takes offer a beautifully bare look at a young artist whose combination of astonishing gifts and troubled life would eventually make him an American folk hero." David Grossman of PopMatters insists the LP "captures the raw power of his songbook as well as any collection before it, and likely several more thereafter." Brian T. Atkinson of The Telegraph states, "By close, Sunshine Boy's joys number many and they're hardly reserved for purists. Superior packaging and key alternate takes (most notably, a far better 'Pancho and Lefty') alone make this collection essential even for casual fans." In a five-star review, Kelly Dearmore of American Songwriter asserts, "Each song forces the listener to stop and wonder where Van Zandt's mind was taking him as a specific song was cut, or what might've been 'really meant' when a certain line was sung. Such unavoidable thoughts and questions give this beautiful double record the weight of an historical document."

== Track listing ==
All songs written by Townes Van Zandt unless otherwise indicated

CD 1

1. "T For Texas" (Jimmie Rodgers)
2. "Who Do You Love" (Ellas McDaniel)
3. "Sunshine Boy"
4. "Where I Lead Me"
5. "Blue Ridge Mountains"
6. "No Deal"
7. "Pancho and Lefty" (Alternate 1972 mix without strings and horns)
8. "To Live Is to Fly"
9. "You Are Not Needed Now"
10. "Don't Take It Too Bad"
11. "Sad Cinderella"
12. "Mr. Mudd and Mr. Gold"
13. "White Freight Liner Blues"
14. "Two Hands"
15. "Lungs"
16. "Dead Flowers" (Mick Jagger, Keith Richards)

CD 2

1. "Heavenly Houseboat Blues" (Van Zandt, Susanna Clark)
2. "Diamond Heel Blues"
3. "To Live Is to Fly"
4. "Tower Song"
5. "You Are Not Needed Now"
6. "Mr. Mudd and Mr. Gold"
7. "Highway Kind"
8. "Greensboro Woman"
9. "When He Offers His Hand"
10. "Dead Flowers" (Jagger, Richards)
11. "Old Paint" (Traditional)
12. "Standin'"
13. "Untitled"

== Additional information ==
- Recorded in 1971 at Larrabee Sound Studios, Los Angeles and 914 Sound Recording Studios, New York
- Recorded in 1972 at Jack Clement Recording Studios, Nashville
- Mixed at O.F.R, North Hollywood, CA
- Mastered Lurssen Mastering
