= Roadsongs (Townes van Zandt album) =

Live album by Townes Van Zandt
- Released: 1994
- Genre: Folk, country
- Length: 1:03:38
- Label: Sugar Hill
- Producer: Townes Van Zandt

Townes Van Zandt chronology
The Nashville Sessions (1993)	''Roadsongs'' (1994)	No Deeper Blue (1994)

Professional ratings
Review scores
Source	Rating
AllMusic	3/5 stars
Rolling Stone	4/5 stars

Roadsongs is a live album of cover songs released by folk/country singer–songwriter Townes Van Zandt in 1994.

== Recordings ==
Roadsongs was released on Sugar Hill Records in 1994, the same year Van Zandt released his final studio album No Deeper Blue, and features live recordings from the mid-seventies through the early eighties. In the liner notes, Van Zandt writes, "These songs were recorded over a number of years in joints all over America. I wish I'd written every one. No such luck. This collection represents a lot of love and fun."

The fifteen songs range from traditional compositions to songs written by Van Zandt's peers and musical heroes. Foremost of these heroes is Texas bluesman Lightnin' Hopkins, whose songs had been part of Van Zandt's repertoire from the very beginning. "I played with him. Visited his house a couple of times," Van Zandt told Patrick Brennan in 1995. "I knew Lightnin' when he was a sixty-year old black blues player who came through hard times from wandering around the country and from white people who were ripping him off steadily. So he didn't have much trust in white people. He liked me because I wasn't there to rip him off." In addition to Hopkins, Bob Dylan was a major formative influence on Van Zandt's songwriting, especially The Times Are A-Changin', which the singer described in a 1995 Danish television interview as "a collection of very serious songs that make your mind work with a guitar and vocal." "Man Gave Name To All Of The Animals" originally appeared on Dylan's 1979 album Slow Train Coming. Van Zandt had previously recorded Lawton Williams's "Fraulein", which had been his father's favorite country song, on his classic 1972 album The Late, Great Townes Van Zandt.

"Indian Cowboy" was written by musician Joe Ely who, in the 2004 biopic Be Here To Love Me, recalls first crossing paths with Van Zandt in Lubbock, Texas when he picked the singer up hitchhiking back to Houston from San Francisco in 1971. Van Zandt was carrying only his guitar and a backpack stuffed with records and, as a means of thanking Ely, gave him a brand-new copy of his second album Our Mother the Mountain. "I'd never met anybody who'd actually recorded an album before," Ely remembered, "and I take the record back to Jimmie Gilmore. We put the record on and we're just mesmerized by it. Ends up we played that record over and over for weeks. It made us rethink what we were doing and what a song was all about." Van Zandt had also been performing Peter La Farge’s "Ira Hayes" and the Rolling Stones classic "Dead Flowers" for many years. Van Zandt's affinity for traditional folk music is represented on Roadsongs as well, with the singer performing "Texas River Song", "Wabash Cannonball" and "Cocaine Blues".

== Reception ==
Roadsongs was overshadowed by the release of No Deeper Blue the same year, which was Van Zandt's first album of original material since 1987's At My Window, but AllMusic calls the album "A snapshot of a true American troubadour doing what he does best: singing about heartbreak in some joint somewhere to folks who know about such things."

== Track listing ==
1. "Ira Hayes" — (Peter La Farge) 3:45
2. "Dead Flowers" — (Mick Jagger, Keith Richards) 4:47
3. "Automobile Blues" — (Lightnin' Hopkins) 5:24
4. "The Coo Coo" — (T. C. Ashley) 4:42
5. "Fraulein" — (Lawton Williams) 3:10
6. "Hello Central" — (Lightnin' Hopkins) 4:10
7. "Indian Cowboy" — (Joe Ely) 2:43
8. "Racing In The Streets" — (Bruce Springsteen) 3:03
9. "My Starter Won't Start This Morning" — (Lightnin' Hopkins) 3:21
10. "Texas River Song" — (Traditional) 2:32
11. "Wabash Cannonball" — (A. P. Carter) 3:31
12. "Short-Haired Woman Blues" — (Lightnin' Hopkins) 3:39
13. "Man Gave Names to All the Animals" — (Bob Dylan) 4:27
14. "Little Willie The Gambler" — (Bob Dylan) 3:45
15. "Cocaine" — (Traditional) 4:05

== Personnel ==
=== Musicians ===
- Townes Van Zandt — vocals, acoustic guitar
- Owen Cody — fiddle
- Jimmie Gray — acoustic bass, vocals
- Mickey White — acoustic guitar
- Ruester Rowland — acoustic guitar

=== Production ===
- Produced by Townes Van Zandt & Harold F. Eggers Jr.
- Mastered by Charlie Hollis at Mars Studio, Austin, TX

=== Artwork ===
- Photography (German Version by Normal) — Bernd Jonkmanns
- Cover design (German Version by Normal) — Olaf Meyer
