= Together at the Bluebird Café =

Live album by Steve Earle, Townes Van Zandt & Guy Clark
- Released: October 9, 2001
- Recorded: September 13, 1995, Bluebird Café, Nashville, Tennessee
- Length: 1:09:01
- Label: American Originals
- Producer: Vinny Adinolfi

Professional ratings
Review scores
| Source | Rating |
|---|---|
| About.com | Favorable |
| Allmusic | 4/5 stars |
| Austin Chronicle | 3/4 stars |
| Country Standard Time | Favorable |
| Figgle | Favorable |
| FolkWax | 7/10 |
| Fretplay | 4/5 stars |
| Goldmine | Favorable |
| Milwaukee Journal Sentinel | Favorable |
| Sing Out! | Favorable |

Together at the Bluebird Café is a live recording of an "in-the-round" concert by three critically acclaimed Texan singer-songwriters, Steve Earle, Townes Van Zandt and Guy Clark. Each alternates between solo performances.

== History ==
The event was organized by Susanna Clark (Clark's wife) as a benefit for the Interfaith Dental Clinic, an organization that works to "restore, protect, and improve the oral health of uninsured, low-income, working people and their children in the greater Nashville area." In the liner notes, Clark says, "When I asked Guy, Townes, and Steve to help me raise money for the Interfaith Dental Clinic, I had no idea what a stir it would cause." The clinic is mentioned in the program by Van Zandt who had been a recipient of their services. Van Zandt tells a story of an incident in which he lost a gold tooth while shooting dice.

The recording took place on September 3, 1995, at The Bluebird Café in Nashville, a nationally renowned venue for songwriters. The owner and manager, Amy Kurland, described the show as "one of the best" in 19 years.

The concert took place 15 months before Van Zandt's death. Just as in his Live at the Old Quarter 22 years earlier, Van Zandt's humor, wedged between some very sad songs is a prominent feature. The stripped-down versions of Earle's songs are also unusual. Earle's own live performances and albums rarely offer the listener so many chances to hear his music without the backing of a full band. Clark spends the least time talking between songs, allowing his songs to tell their own stories. Occasionally the artists interact, such as when Clark joins Earle on the "Mercenary Song".

A female vocalist not credited in the liner notes, but apparently Emmylou Harris adds a harmony vocal to Guy Clark's "Immigrant Eyes" and on Steve Earle's "Copperhead Road". Earle names Mark Stuart as the additional guitarist on "Copperhead Road".

== Track listing ==
1. "Baby Took a Limo to Memphis" (Guy Clark) – 3:31
2. "My Old Friend the Blues" (Steve Earle) – 3:03
3. Townes: Introduction to "Katie Belle" – 1:44
4. "Katie Belle" (Townes Van Zandt) – 3:13
5. "The Cape" (Guy Clark, Susanna Clark, Jim Jonosky) – 3:29
6. Steve: Introduction to "Valentine's Day" – 1:03
7. "Valentine's Day" (Earle) – 3:10
8. "Ain't Leavin' Your Love" (Van Zandt) – 2:55
9. "Randall Knife" (Clark) – 4:46
10. "Tom Ames' Prayer" (Earle) – 3:22
11. Townes: The Interfaith Dental Clinic – 4:29
12. "A Song For" (Van Zandt) – 3:29
13. "Dublin Blues" (Clark) – 4:29
14. "I Ain't Ever Satisfied" (Earle) – 4:00
15. "Pancho and Lefty" (Van Zandt) – 5:22
16. "Immigrant Eyes" (Clark, Roger Murrah) – 4:08
17. Steve: Sirocco's Pizza – 1:42
18. "Mercenary Song" (Earle) – 3:02
19. "Tecumseh Valley" (Van Zandt) – 4:36
20. "Copperhead Road" (Earle) – 3:20

== Charts ==
| year | chart | peak |
|---|---|---|
| 2001 | Billboard Top Internet Albums | 21 |

== Credits ==
- Executive producers: Amy Kurland, Len Handler, Phil Kurnit
- Compilation produced by: Vinny Adinolfi
- Edited by: Elliott Federman & Vinny Adinolfi
- Mastered by: Elliott Federman at Saje Sound, New York City
- Recorded at the Bluebird Café, Nashville, Tennessee by: Neil Fagan & Phil Smith
- Production co-ordinator for The Bluebird Café: Fran Overall
- Art direction and design: Amy Bennick, Anything You See, Inc.
- Photography: Señor McGuire, Al Clayton, Steve Luvkin, Michael Wilson, and Anthony Lathrop

== Releases ==
| year | format | label | catalog # |
|---|---|---|---|
| 2001 | CD | American Originals | 4006 |
| 2001 | CD | Catfish | 214 |
| 2004 | CD | Snapper | 161 |
