= Flyin' Shoes =

Studio album by Townes Van Zandt
- Released: May 1978
- Recorded: January 1978
- Studios: American, Nashville, Tennessee
- Genres: Folk, country
- Length: 33:24
- Label: Tomato
- Producer: Chips Moman

Townes Van Zandt chronology
Live at the Old Quarter, Houston, Texas (1977)	Flyin' Shoes (1978)	At My Window (1987)

Flyin' Shoes is a studio album by the American musician Townes Van Zandt, released in 1978. It was his first album of original material in five years and was produced by Chips Moman.

== 7 Come 11 ==
Many of the songs that appeared on Flyin' Shoes were originally recorded in 1973 for an album with the working title 7 Come 11. The album was not released, however, due to a dispute between producer Jack Clement and Poppy Records founder Kevin Eggers. As Van Zandt's former manager John Lomax III explains in the 2004 biopic Be Here To Love Me, "That was the sort of missing link in his career. If that had come out right on top of the Late Great, it would've really been a whole other thing but I think Kevin lost the deal so Jack Clement just held on to the tapes."

In the same documentary, Steve Earle confirms that the tapes "got put back into the tape pool because Kevin Eggers didn't pay for them." According to John Kruth's 2007 biography To Live's To Fly: The Ballad of the Late, Great Townes Van Zandt, the bad feelings had been festering ever since Clement had requested that Van Zandt alter a potentially offensive line in the song "Tecumseh Valley" for the singer's debut album For the Sake of the Song back in 1968, and that by 1974 Clement and Eggers "had come to a final parting of the ways. Between Kevin's unpaid bills and some of the Cowboy's more questionable production decisions...there was some bad blood behind them. And Van Zandt's dual Jekyll and Hyde personality could turn a shaky situation volatile in a heartbeat."

By all accounts, Van Zandt was extremely frustrated that 7 Come 11 had been held up, with guitarist Mickey White telling director Margaret Brown in 2004 that any hopes they had that the album would come out "were just about gone. Every time we'd try to call Kevin to find out what was going on with it, or try to communicate with him, it was just clear." A short time after the split with Clement, Poppy Records went under, further isolating Van Zandt from the music business.

By 1978, Van Zandt had released no new original material in five years and was living with his second wife Cindy in a cabin in Franklin, Tennessee where, as Earle recalls in Be Here To Love Me, the troubadour spent most of his time listening to Paul Harvey every morning and watching Happy Days. However, the stagnation worsened Van Zandt's drug and alcohol problems, with the singer's son J.T. telling John Kruth in 2007 that his father openly did drugs in front of him when he visited his dad as a boy." 7 Come 11 would finally be released as The Nashville Sessions in 1993.

== Recording ==
Flyin' Shoes was recorded at American Studios in Nashville. It was produced by Chips Moman. Moman brought several top session musicians in for the recording, including Gary and Randy Scruggs, Muscle Shoals pianist Spooner Oldham and Irish guitarist Philip Donnelly, who had worked with The Everly Brothers. Van Zandt arrived at the sessions nursing a broken strumming hand from a car wreck. There is a perceptible change in Van Zandt's vocal delivery, which sounds less animated than on his earlier albums. The sessions were delayed for a time when Moman left to be with his wife after she delivered a baby.

== Composition ==
The song "Dollar Bill Blues" contains one of the most violent lines Van Zandt ever wrote – "Mother was a golden girl, slit her throat just to get her pearls" – and is one of just a handful of new songs the singer brought to the sessions; the album is composed predominantly of re-recordings of songs initially attempted during the 7 Come 11 sessions. Several of the songs (including "Loretta," "No Place To Fall," "Rex's Blues" and a cover of the Bo Diddley classic "Who Do You Love") initially appeared on Van Zandt's critically acclaimed Live at the Old Quarter, Houston, Texas, which was recorded in 1973 and released in 1977. AllMusic describes "No Place To Fall" as "a teary waltz, a love song that pleads for connection and tries to be seductive, but ultimately succumbs to its own pessimism." The line "Leave these Texas blues behind and see Susanna and Guy" in "Pueblo Waltz" refers to Van Zandt's friends Guy Clark and his wife Susanna. According to biographer John Kruth, "Flyin' Shoes" was written while Van Zandt sat by the Harpeth River, where the Battle of Franklin took place, and the author speculates that he might have been influenced by the nineteenth century gospel tune "Golden Slippers." In the Be Here To Love Me documentary, Van Zandt's second wife Cindy believes the line, "Baby it won't be long till I'll be tyin' on my flyin' shoes" was written about the singer having to leave her to go out on the road.

== Release and reception ==
Professional ratings
Review scores
Source	Rating
The Rolling Stone Album Guide	3/5 stars

Although it was not a commercial success at the time of its release in 1978, Flyin' Shoes has since come to be considered one of Van Zandt's strongest collection of songs, with AllMusic calling it "another stalwart collection from Townes Van Zandt, and not a dud in the bunch. The melodies here are strong, the lyrics full of Van Zandt's razor sharp insight, and the production is sparse and to the point, bringing to mind the inconspicuous polish of High, Low and In Between." The Boston Globe noted that "Loretta" "is one of the most heartfelt songs ever written about a barmaid." Biographer John Kruth writes in To Live's To Fly that "Townes's delivery is laconic at best. Throughout the album the playing and arrangements are solid, while Van Zandt appears to be lost in a fog of vodka."

Many of the songs on Flyin' Shoes have been covered by other artists. "No Place To Fall" has been recorded by Willy Mason, Steve Earle, Rhonda Harris and Steve Young. A duet of the song featuring Van Zandt and Willie Nelson can also be found on The Best of Townes Van Zandt. Richard Dobson included three songs from Flyin' Shoes for his 1994 tribute album Amigos: Richard Dobson Sings Townes Van Zandt. Ramblin' Jack Elliott recorded "Rex's Blues" as a duet with Emmylou Harris and Nanci Griffith for his 1998 album Friends Of Mine, while Guy Clark recorded the song for his 2002 album The Dark. "Snake Song" has been recorded by Fatal Shore on their 1997 self-titled LP; Isobel Campbell and Mark Lanegan on their 2010 album Hawk; and Emmylou Harris on Poet: A Tribute to Townes Van Zandt. "Loretta" was covered by John Prine (on the album Poet: A Tribute to Townes Van Zandt), Jesse Dayton, Will Dupuy, Fort King, Michael Fracasso, and John Guliak, the Stray Birds and the Lougan Brothers. Glory Fountain recorded "Flyin' Shoes" for the album The Beauty of 23 in 2002, and Lyle Lovett covered the song on his 1998 album Step Inside This House.

== Track listing ==
All songs written by Townes Van Zandt, except where noted.

1. "Loretta"
2. "No Place to Fall"
3. "Flyin' Shoes"
4. "Who Do You Love?" (Ellas McDaniel)
5. "When She Don't Need Me"
6. "Dollar Bill Blues"
7. "Rex's Blues"
8. "Pueblo Waltz"
9. "Brother Flower"
10. "Snake Song"

== Personnel ==
Musicians

- Townes Van Zandt – acoustic guitar, lead vocals
- Philip Donnelly – acoustic guitar, electric guitar, background vocals
- Billy Earl McClelland – acoustic guitar, electric guitar, background vocals
- Chips Moman – acoustic guitar, electric guitar, background vocals
- Randy Scruggs – acoustic guitar, mandolin
- Tommy Cogbill – bass guitar
- Bobby Emmons – keyboards
- Eddy Anderson – drums, percussion
- Jimmy Day – keyboards
- Gary Scruggs – harmonica
- Spooner Oldham – piano
- Billy Burnette – background vocals
- Toni Wine – background vocals

Technical

- Chips Moman – engineer, remix engineer, producer
- Don Cartee – engineer, remix engineer
- Milton Glaser – design
- Wood Newton – photography
