= Townes Van Zandt (album) =

Studio album by Townes Van Zandt
- Released: September 1969
- Recorded: July 1969
- Studio: Bradley's Barn, Mt. Juliet, Tennessee
- Genre: Country; folk
- Length: 33:59
- Label: Poppy
- Producer: Kevin Eggers; Jim Malloy

Townes Van Zandt chronology
Our Mother the Mountain (1969)	Townes Van Zandt (1969)	Delta Momma Blues (1971)

Professional ratings
Review scores
Source	Rating
AllMusic	4/5 stars

Townes Van Zandt is the third studio album by the American singer-songwriter Townes Van Zandt, released in September 1969 by Poppy Records. It includes re-recordings of four songs from his 1968 debut album, including the first song he ever wrote, "Waitin' Around to Die".

== Recording and reception ==
=== Recording and re-recorded songs ===
Townes Van Zandt was recorded at Bradley's Barn in Nashville. The album consists of ten originals and showcases Van Zandt's poetic lyrics and trademark, uncluttered fingerpicking. It also includes new versions of four songs from his first album For the Sake of the Song, primarily because Van Zandt was unhappy with the lush production these compositions were treated with when they were originally recorded. The remakes include "Waiting Around to Die", "I'll Be Here in the Morning" (originally appearing as "I'll Be There in the Morning"), "For the Sake of the Song" and "(Quicksilver Day Dreams of) Maria".

=== Reception ===
In the songbook For the Sake of the Song published in 1977, Van Zandt claimed "For the Sake of the Song" was inspired by "the darkness of disease and the fire of frustration." In his 2007 book To Live's To Fly: The Ballad of the Late, Great Townes Van Zandt, John Kruth writes that "(Quicksilver Day Dreams of) Maria" is a "majestic waltz that reveals Van Zandt's ultimate vision of feminine perfection" while "Fare Thee Well, Miss Carousel" "relates a tale of bitter disappointment in intricate wordplay and metaphor, with a twist of spite that sounds inspired by Dylan." Kruth also speculates that "Don't You Take It Too Bad" could have been a hit on the soul charts if Ray Charles had gotten hold of it. AllMusic gives the album 4 out of 5 stars with William Ruhlmann stating, "As usual, his closely observed lyrics touched on desperate themes, notably in the mining ballad 'Lungs', but they were still highly poetic, especially the album-closing 'None But The Rain,' which reflected on a failed relationship." Regarding the use of drums on "Fare Thee Well, Miss Carousel", the liner notes to the Charly Records reissue of the album observe that it "is one of only a handful of occasions in Van Zandt’s entire recorded catalogue where their sound fits comfortably within the context of the recording and also his composition."

=== Retrospective reviews ===
Mark Lager, on the album's 50th anniversary in 2019, wrote that Our Mother the Mountain and Townes Van Zandt's self-titled album are "the strongest of his entire career since they contained compositions written solely by Van Zandt himself, whereas his later albums would frequently feature multiple covers of older blues and country singers. “Waiting Around to Die” is a catalog of interstate pain from the cradle to the grave: family violence in Tennessee, heartbreak in Alabama, jail in Oklahoma, and alcoholism and drug addiction. “Lungs” is a bleak, stark and tough tale about the lives of miners. “Quicksilver Daydreams of Maria” is one of the most achingly beautiful love songs ever written, a portrait of the singer’s muse that moves the listener to tears with the band’s mournful and romantic Spanish guitar and violin and some of Townes Van Zandt’s most deeply moving and powerful lyrics."

=== Cover artwork ===
The cover photograph was taken by Sol Mednick in the kitchen of Poppy Records artwork designer Milton Glaser and features Van Zandt sitting at a table with his eyes closed. Comparing the album cover to the one that adorned Van Zandt's previous album, Our Mother the Mountain, biographer John Kruth observes, "Where his black eyes once glared so hard you might've wondered if he shattered the photographer's lens, Van Zandt now appears withdrawn...Here he sits resigned, head in hand, in a perfectly painted kitchen where everything is neatly arranged, as in a doll's house." Some fans refer to Townes Van Zandt as The Kitchen Album.

=== Covers ===
Many of the compositions on Townes Van Zandt have been covered by other artists. Some notable examples include "For the Sake of the Song", which was recorded by Azure Ray on their EP November and William Boyd Chisum on his 2006 album Chasing The Wind. "Columbine" appeared on the 2000 album The Girl I Left Behind by Joyce Andersen. "Lungs" appeared on the 1995 live album Nights Between Stations by Chris & Carla and on the 2005 release Cask Strength Black Metal by black metal band Dead Raven Choir. Van Zandt's close friend and fellow troubadour Guy Clark covered "Don't You Take It Too Bad" on his 1979 On The Road Live album and again on his 1995 LP Craftsman. Van Zandt disciple Steve Earle recorded four songs from the album for his tribute Townes in 2009. Gustav Haggren covered "Fare Thee Well, Miss Carousel" on the 2009 album Introducing Townes Van Zandt Via the Great Unknown. "Waiting Around to Die" is one of the singer's most covered compositions, having been recorded by The Be Good Tanyas (whose version appears in the episode "Bit by a Dead Bee" in the second season of the hit TV series Breaking Bad), Matt Cutillo, the Dead Raven Choir, Biana De Leon, Foreign Born, Frenchy Burrito, Pat Haney, Rhonda Harris and Helldorado. A duet of "Waiting Around to Die" featuring Van Zandt and Calvin Russell can be heard on The Best of Townes Van Zandt.

== Track listing ==
All tracks written by Townes Van Zandt

The track listing of Townes Van Zandt is as follows:

Side one
No.	Title	Length
1.	"For the Sake of the Song"	5:22
2.	"Columbine"	2:34
3.	"Waiting Around to Die"	2:45
4.	"Don't Take It Too Bad"	2:54
5.	"Colorado Girl"	3:18

Side two
No.	Title	Length
6.	"Lungs"	2:29
7.	"I'll Be Here in the Morning"	3:00
8.	"Fare Thee Well, Miss Carousel"	5:22
9.	"(Quicksilver Daydreams Of) Maria"	4:45
10.	"None But the Rain"	2:23
Total length:		34:52

== Personnel ==
- Townes Van Zandt – vocals, guitar, violin
