= Live at the Old Quarter, Houston, Texas =

Live album by Townes Van Zandt
- Released: May 1977
- Recorded: July 1973
- Venue: The Old Quarter, Houston, Texas
- Length: 92:40
- Label: Tomato (original release); Rhino; Charly; CoraZong; Fat Possum
- Producer: Earl Willis

Townes Van Zandt chronology
The Late Great Townes Van Zandt (1972)	Live at the Old Quarter, Houston, Texas (1977)	Flyin' Shoes (1978)

Professional ratings
Review scores
Source	Rating
AllMusic	4.5/5 stars
Best of Country Music	(favorable)
Cosmik Debris	(favorable)
Crescent Blues	(favorable)
Folk World	(favorable)
Goldmine	(favorable)
Music Box	5/5 stars
PopMatters	(favorable)
Rolling Stone	5/5 stars

Live at the Old Quarter, Houston, Texas is a double live album by Texas singer-songwriter Townes Van Zandt. The recording captures Van Zandt in a series of July 1973 performances in an intimate venue Old Quarter. There is a strong critical consensus that this recording is among the most exemplary of Van Zandt's career.

== Recording ==
In July 1973, Van Zandt performed a string of shows over five sweltering nights at the Old Quarter bar owned by Rex ("Wrecks") Bell and Dale Soffar that were recorded on a portable four-track by Earl Willis, the album's producer and engineer. They would eventually be released four years later by Van Zandt's previous producer and manager Kevin Eggers on his new Tomato Records label. The liner notes describe the recording as the "Rosetta Stone" of Texas music. One can hear Van Zandt's influences in covers by artists like Bo Diddley, Texas bluesman Lightnin' Hopkins, and country picker Merle Travis. Van Zandt's most famous works can also be heard, such as "If I Needed You" and "Pancho and Lefty" played to an audience not already familiar with these songs. The singer's laconic banter and corny jokes are also on full display. The album is also noted for the intimacy of the performance, with Van Zandt taking the stage alone and accompanying himself on guitar as he did thousands of times during his career. In the 2007 biography To Live's To Fly: The Ballad of the Late, Great Townes Van Zandt, John Kruth writes that Van Zandt played "to nearly a hundred folks per set, packed shoulder to shoulder within the bar's bare brick walls. The room was so jammed that it was impossible for a waitress to wend her way through the crowd to take drink orders. People had to pass money hand over fist and wait, in hopes that a mug of cold beer would eventually find its way back to them." Van Zandt is introduced by Dale Soffar and, after apologizing for the busted air conditioning, performs a gentle reading of "Pancho and Lefty", describing how he wrote the song while traveling near Dallas with Daniel Antopolsky. At the end of the song, the singer remarks, "I've never heard it so quiet in here." The photograph on the album cover was shot by Steve Salmieri.

== Release and reception ==
The release of Live at the Old Quarter, Houston, Texas in 1977 followed a period of relative inactivity for Van Zandt, whose last album, The Late Great Townes Van Zandt was released in 1972. Van Zandt had recorded a follow-up with the working title 7 Come 11, but its release was held up due to a dispute between producer Jack Clement and Poppy Records founder Kevin Eggers. When the live album finally came out it received euphoric praise from critics, who had bemoaned the overproduction on some of his earlier records. Sean Mitchell of the Dallas Times Herald commented, "Though this gifted songwriter has been a legend in and around the folk circuit of the Southwest for a decade, his albums have been harder to find than El Dorado." The LA Times hailed Van Zandt as "a cross between Woody Guthrie and Leonard Cohen." AllMusic writes that Van Zandt "could work magic in front of an audience under the right circumstances, and while a wealth of live recordings of Van Zandt have emerged since his passing on the first day of 1997, Live at the Old Quarter, Houston, Texas ranks with the very best of his concert albums." Amazon.com opines, "It's not just his best live album, but maybe his best album, period." Chris Robinson of the Black Crowes told Van Zandt biographer John Kruth that he'd been given a copy of the album by Mark Olson of the Jayhawks and that the record "really spoke to me. I listened to it constantly while on a tour of Europe. In rock and roll people tend to forget about the importance of songwriting. Townes really inspired me to become a better songwriter. That motherfucker had his antennas up."

Van Zandt remained cautiously optimistic about his critical windfall, stating in a 1977 interview with Omaha Rainbow, "I kind of forgot all about them. Then Kevin Eggers took the tapes to a studio at Lima, Ohio, and came out with the record. It's okay. That's what went down and it's good to have. Getting that record out on Tomato meant to me that all the mire that the business end of my career got wedged into was finally evaporating. I was out of the chute on a brand new horse, right?"

== Track listing ==
All lyrics and music by Townes Van Zandt except where noted.

Disc 1:

1. "Announcement" (by Dale Soffar) – :44
2. "Pancho and Lefty" – 4:08
3. "Mr. Mudd & Mr. Gold" – 3:40
4. "Don't You Take It Too Bad" – 2:57
5. "Two Girls" – 3:51
6. "Fraternity Blues" – 3:07
7. "If I Needed You" – 3:18
8. "Brand New Companion" – 4:20
9. "White Freight Liner Blues" – 3:26
10. "To Live Is to Fly" – 3:20
11. "She Came and She Touched Me" – 4:09
12. "Talking Thunderbird Blues" – 2:33
13. "Rex's Blues" – 3:05
14. "Nine Pound Hammer" (Merle Travis) – 3:06

Disc 2:

1. "For the Sake of the Song" – 4:48
2. "Chauffeur's Blues" (Lightnin' Hopkins) – 4:33
3. "No Place to Fall" – 3:08
4. "Loretta" – 2:26
5. "Kathleen" – 2:54
6. "Why She's Acting This Way" – 5:42
7. "Cocaine Blues" (Traditional) – 3:21
8. "Who Do You Love?" (Ellas McDaniel) – 3:44
9. "Tower Song" – 3:47
10. "Waiting 'Round to Die" – 2:35
11. "Tecumseh Valley" – 4:30
12. "Lungs" – 2:34
13. "Only Him or Me" – 2:42

== Release history ==
year	format	label	catalog #
1977	LP	Tomato	27001
1977		Tomato	20001
1989	CD	Tomato	2696402
1989	LP	Decal	LIKD 57
1994	CD	Rhino	71245
2002	CD	Tomato Music	3011
2003	CD	Charly	508
2003	CD	CoraZong	255041
2008	CD	Fat Possum	1118-2
2009	LP	Fat Possum	1118-1

== Personnel ==
=== Music ===
- Townes Van Zandt – acoustic guitar, vocals

=== Production ===
- Record producer by: Earl Willis
- Recorded at: The Old Quarter, Houston, Texas
  - Engineer: Earl Willis
- Mixed & Edited at: Northwestern Sound Studios, Lima, Ohio
  - Engineer: Benny Young
- Mastered at: Mediasound Studios, New York, N.Y.
  - Engineer: Ray Janos
- Reissue production coordination by Kevin Calabro and Katja Maas
- Remastered by Paul Zinman

=== Artwork/liner notes ===
- Liner notes by Earl Willis, Chet Flippo and Arthur Wood
- Edited by John Tobler
- Cover design by Milton Glaser
- Photography by Steve Salmieri
