= The Nashville Sessions (Townes Van Zandt album) =

Studio album by Townes Van Zandt
- Released: 1993
- Studios: Jack Clement Recording (Nashville, Tennessee)
- Genres: Country, folk
- Label: Tomato
- Producer: Kevin Eggers

Townes Van Zandt chronology
Rain on a Conga Drum: Live in Berlin (1993)	The Nashville Sessions (1993)	Roadsongs (1994)

Professional ratings
Review scores
Source	Rating
Pitchfork	9.0/10

The Nashville Sessions is an album by American singer/songwriter Townes Van Zandt, recorded in 1973 but not released until 1993 as his ninth studio album. The tracks were originally recorded for what would have been Van Zandt's seventh album (with the working title of Seven Come Eleven), but was not released until twenty years later due to a dispute between producer Jack Clement and Poppy Records founder Kevin Eggers.

== Recording ==
Van Zandt released two albums in 1972, including The Late Great Townes Van Zandt, which included two of his most covered songs, "If I Needed You" and "Pancho and Lefty". His momentum was derailed, however, when the release of his next album was held up. As Van Zandt's former manager John Lomax III explains in the 2004 biopic Be Here To Love Me, "that was the sort of the missing link in his career. If that had come out right on top of the Late Great, it would've really been a whole nother thing but I think Kevin lost the deal so Jack Clement just held on to the tapes". In the same documentary Steve Earle confirms that the tapes "got put back into the tape pool because Kevin Eggers didn't pay for them".

According to John Kruth's 2007 biography To Live's To Fly: The Ballad of the Late, Great Townes Van Zandt, Lomax claims the original rough-board mixes of what became The Nashville Sessions reveal a stripped-down rhythm section providing solid support without the excessive overproduction that was added as an afterthought. Speaking of "White Freightliner Blues" guitarist Mickey White recalls, "I remember disagreein' with the production on it. I know that Townes wanted me to play guitar on that song but when I got there, it was already fully produced. There weren't any open tracks left for me to play on". As Kruth observes, "If the objectionable production can somehow be overlooked, it's apparent that The Nashville Sessions was filled with great songs. But along with new gems like 'The Spider Song' and 'Buckskin Stallion Blues' were hackneyed versions of 'White Freight Liner Blues' and 'Loretta', which both appeared earlier, in more definitive versions, on Live at the Old Quarter". While the background singers, hoedown fiddles and banjo picking that augment several of the songs may have been jarring for some Van Zandt fans, the instrumentation does provide the collection with a brightness not found on the singer's previous albums. White claims that Chuck Cochran really produced and arranged the album, playing piano and conducting the "monastery"-type backing vocals on "The Spider Song". The album also features Bobby Thompson on guitar, Joe Allen on bass, and Kenny Malone on drums.

== Composition ==
The album opener "At My Window" recalls Van Zandt's composition from the year before, "To Live Is to Fly," with life-affirming lyrics like "Living is laughing, dying is nothing at all". The gentle "No Place to Fall" and the rousing "Loretta" paint two very different portraits of female perfection, the latter telling the story of a barroom girl who is perpetually twenty-two and "tells me lies I love to b'lieve". The title "Rex's Blues" alludes to Van Zandt's friend Rex Bell, with the singer commenting in his preamble to the song on Live at the Old Quarter: "This song's about this good friend of mine, uh, Rex Bell, who used to own half this place. It's called 'Rex's Blues.' If you cut cards with Rex and you get a three he'll get a two, y'know what I mean?" Bell later stated of the song, "I didn't like it for many years. But he really pegged me". The song explores the singer's long battle with depression, its subject matter contrasting with the understated, gently plucked banjo and the singer's amiable vocal delivery. "Pueblo Waltz" also name-drops a couple Van Zandt's friends, Susanna and Guy Clark. "Two Girls", which includes the lines "I've got two girls, one's in Heaven, one's below", may have been inspired by Van Zandt's former girlfriend Leslie Jo Richards, who had been murdered the year before. The song paints a surreal landscape peopled with oddball characters like Jolly Jane and her dozen husbands who come and go, caught in the oblique routines of their lives with no rhyme or reason. Commenting on "White Freight Liner Blues", biographer John Kruth contends it is:

...an obvious metaphor for the heroin barreling like a semi down the Interstate of Van Zandt's veins, addresses the dangers that he and his pals constantly faced for a brief moment of euphoria...The song brought together two of Van Zandt's biggest inspirations – a driving rockabilly rhythm with a blues lyric reminiscent of "Trouble in Mind, a standard in Lightnin' Hopkins' set...

== Track listing ==
All lyrics and music by Townes Van Zandt:

1. "At My Window"
2. "Rex's Blues"
3. "No Place to Fall"
4. "Buckskin Stallion"
5. "White Freight Liner Blues"
6. "The Snake Song"
7. "Loretta"
8. "Two Girls"
9. "The Spider Song"
10. "When She Don't Need Me"
11. "Pueblo Waltz"
12. "Upon My Soul"

== Bibliography ==
- Kruth, John (2008) [2007]. To Live's to Fly: The Ballad of the Late, Great Townes Van Zandt (Reprint ed.). Hachette Books. ISBN 978-0-306-81604-8. (Internet Archive link)
