= Director's Cut (Helldorado album) =

Studio album by Helldorado
- Released: February 23, 2004
- Recorded: 2004
- Genre: Alt.country, country rock, garage rock, Americana
- Length: 47:01
- Label: Glitterhouse Records
- Producer: Eirik Lye & Helldorado

Helldorado chronology
Lost Highway (2002)	Director's Cut (2004)	The Ballad of Nora Lee (2005)

Professional ratings
Review scores
Source	Rating
Classic Rock	2/5 stars

Director's Cut is the second studio album from the Norwegian band Helldorado.

== Track listing ==
All songs by Dag S. Vagle, except "Payrolled", "I´d Waited for This Day" - music by Vagle, lyrics by Martin Hagfors, and "Diesel and Bones" - music by Vagle, lyrics by Vagle & Hagfors.

1. "Blood Shack" - 4:33
2. "Lucy and Mary" - 5:32
3. "Payrolled" - 3:24
4. "Diesel and Bones" - 3:52
5. "The Snake Girl Song" - 3:13
6. "Dead River" - 5:33
7. "I´d Waited for This Day" - 5:08
8. "Killer on the Highway" - 3:20
9. "Teenage Queen" - 4:16
10. "Woman Shouldn´t Drink" - 2:35
11. "Roadhouse" - 5:35
12. "Surfin' Transylvania" (bonus track) - 2:17

== Personnel ==
=== Helldorado ===
- Dag S. Vagle: Vocals, Guitar, Banjo, Bouzouki, Organ
- Bård Halsne: Guitar, Space Echo, Backing Vocals
- Hans A. Wassvik: Bass guitar, Pedal Bass
- Morten Jackman: Drums, Saw, Percussion

=== Guest musicians ===
- Rune Helland - Pedal Steel (1,6,8)
- Pete Johansen - Fiddle (7)
- Ry Krueger - Slide Guitar (11)
- Anne Mae H. Vagle - Backing Vocals (1,2,8)
- Marianne Albert - Backing Vocals (2)
- Martin Hagfors - Backing Vocals (7)
- Angeli Kvartetten - Strings (2,6)
- Johan Egdetveit - String arrangement (2)
- Bengt Olav Hansen - String arrangement (6)
