= Daniel Antopolsky =

American country musician

- Born: Augusta, Georgia, U.S.
- Genres: Country; outlaw country
- Occupations: Musician; singer-songwriter
- Instruments: Guitar; vocals
- Website: danielantopolsky.com

Daniel Antopolsky is an American singer-songwriter. He is associated with the outlaw country movement, and describes his music as being influenced by country, blues, rock & roll, gospel, and synagogue harmonies.

== Career ==
In 1972, Antopolsky met Townes Van Zandt in a coffee shop in Athens, Georgia and they became friends. They toured together for several months in Antopolsky's Ford van and visited Guy Clark, going to Nashville, Colorado and Texas. At 24 years old, Antopolsky saved Van Zandt's life by performing CPR after Van Zandt had overdosed on heroin. The two of them were alone together when Van Zandt wrote Pancho and Lefty and Antopolsky wrote Sweet Lovin' Music.

In 2015, Antopolsky released his debut album, Sweet Lovin' Music, which was produced by Gary Gold and John Capek. He then performed at South by Southwest in 2016. In 2018 he performed at Bush Hall, and in 2019 performed at the Black Deer Festival.

A documentary about Antopolsky's life premiered as a rough cut at Nashville Film Festival in 2019, called "Sheriff of Mars", directed by Jason Ressler and Matthew Woolf.

== Discography ==
- Sweet Lovin' Music (2015)
- Acoustic Outlaw, Vol. 1 (2016)
- Acoustic Outlaw, Vol. 2 (2016)
- Old Timey, Soulful, Hippy-Dippy, Flower Child Songs from the Cosmos... Wow!(Unheard Songs of the Early 1970s, Pt. 1) (2017)
- Old Timey, Soulful, Hippy-Dippy, Flower Child Songs from the Cosmos... Wow!(Unheard Songs of the Early 1970s, Pt. 2) (2022)
- No People Allowed (2024)
- Ballad of the Stable Boy (2025)
