= The Nashville Sessions =

The Nashville Sessions may refer to:

== Music ==
- Chicago XXXV: The Nashville Sessions, by the band Chicago 2013
- The Nashville Sessions (Dean Martin album), 1983
- The Nashville Session or The Nashville Session 2, albums by The New Mastersounds in 2016 and 2018
- The Nashville Sessions (Townes Van Zandt album), 1993
- The Nashville Sessions, album by Leftover Salmon 1999
- The Nashville Sessions, UK version of Buddy Holly album That'll Be the Day
- The Nashville Sessions, highlights album from the musical The Civil War
- Down the Old Plank Road: The Nashville Sessions, 2002 album by The Chieftains
