= Live and Obscure =

Live album by Townes Van Zandt
- Released: 1987
- Recorded: April 19, 1985
- Venue: Twelfth and Porter, Nashville, Tennessee
- Length: 42:44
- Label: Heartland (UK)
- Producer: Stephen J. Mendell, Townes Van Zandt

Townes Van Zandt chronology
At My Window (1987)	Live and Obscure (1987)	Rain on a Conga Drum: Live in Berlin (1992)

Professional ratings
Review scores
Source	Rating
Allmusic	link

Live and Obscure is a live album released by folk/country singer-songwriter Townes Van Zandt in 1987. It was recorded at Twelfth and Porter in Nashville, Tennessee in April 1985.

== Recording ==
Although Van Zandt had always been known primarily as a solo performer, by the mid-1980s he had expanded his touring band with the addition of Leland Waddell on drums, his brother David on bass, and Boston transplant Donny Silverman on saxophone and flute. The group was rounded out by Van Zandt's longtime guitarist Mickey White, who recalled to Van Zandt biographer John Kruth in 2007, "Unfortunately the rehearsals just turned into big drunken orgies with everybody arguing all the time. We'd just get drunk and wind up screaming at each other. If we'd been sober, we woulda been a great band." The band gigged around Texas mostly, but Van Zandt eventually realized that hauling a full band around with him was a logistical nightmare, and by the time his manager Harold Eggers booked the show at Twelfth and Porter in Nashville, the Waddell rhythm section had been abandoned.

According to the book To Live's To Fly: The Ballad of the Late, Great Townes Van Zandt, the show was well hyped, with Guy Clark, Rodney Crowell, Rosanne Cash, and Neil Young attending to see Van Zandt perform, although the book quotes White as saying, "I didn't like the way it was recorded and tried to talk Townes out of releasing it." In his 2018 memoir My Years with Townes Van Zandt: Music, Genius, and Rage, road manager and business partner Harold Eggers takes credit for suggesting the idea of recording the show at the 12th and Porter show and getting leading music writer Robert K. Oermann to write an article in The Tennessean titled "Poet Laureate of Texas' Rambles into Music City" to hype the concert. Eggers writes:

The room was filled with Townes's people. Nashville's top producers and engineers, songwriters, and performers were there...Bee Spears, John Prine, Jack Clement, and so many more...It was a gala "Welcome Back, Townes" party, and you would have thought Hank Williams Sr. himself had risen and returned to do one last show...you could hear a pin drop – until each song ended, when the applause and cheers nearly blew off the roof.

== Reception ==
AllMusic praises Live and Obscure, noting that "The rambling Texas troubadour did not disappoint his fans, peers, and colleagues that night...In this intimate setting, Van Zandt's aw-shucks charm comes through not just his songs, but his in-between banter."

== Track listing ==
All songs written by Townes Van Zandt

1. "Dollar Bill Blues" – 2:40
2. "Many a Fine Lady" – 3:51
3. "Nothin' " – 3:23
4. "Pueblo Waltz" – 2:24
5. "Talking Thunderbird Blues" – 2:09
6. "Rex's Blues" – 2:19
7. "White Freightliner Blues" – 3:12
8. "Loretta" – 3:31
9. "Snake Mountain Blues" – 2:53
10. "Waiting Around to Die" – 2:54
11. "Tecumseh Valley" – 4:28
12. "Pancho and Lefty" – 4:19
13. "You Are Not Needed Now" – 4:41

== Personnel ==
- Townes Van Zandt – vocals, guitar
- Donny Silverman – flute, saxophone
- Mickey White – guitar

== Production notes ==
- Produced by Stephen J. Mendell and Townes Van Zandt
- Harold F. Eggers, Jr. – executive producer
- James Loyd – mastering
- Robert K. Oermann – liner notes
- Alan Mayor – photography
- G. Brook Sefton – design
