= At My Window =

At My Window may mean:

- At My Window (album), an album by Townes Van Zandt
- "At My Window", a song by the Beach Boys from their album Sunflower
