= Old Quarter Acoustic Cafe =

American music venue in Houston, Texas

- Interactive map of Old Quarter Acoustic Cafe
- Former names: Old Quarter
- Address: 413 20th Street
- Location: Galveston, Texas
- Coordinates: 29°18′20.8″N 94°47′25.2″W
- Owner: Joel & Angela Mora
- Seating type: Tables, Rows & Bar
- Capacity: 85
- Type: Music venue

Construction
- Opened: 1965 (Houston)
- Closed: 1979
- Reopened: 1996 (Galveston)

Website
- oldquarteracousticcafe.com

Old Quarter Acoustic Cafe is a music "Listening Room" in Galveston, Texas founded by Rex "Wrecks" Bell. Originally a bar Old Quarter, it was opened in Houston, Texas in 1965 by Rex Bell and Cecil Slayton. The Old Quarter is most well-known as the venue for Townes Van Zandt live album Live at the Old Quarter, Houston, Texas. The song Rex's Blues from the album was written about Rex Bell whom Van Zandt remarked upon during the recorded live performance. The reopened Old Quarter Acoustic Cafe in Galveston, Texas features recurring "open mic" acoustic music performances.

== History ==
Founders Rex Bell and Cecil Slayton opened a bar named Old Quarter in Houston, Texas near the corner of Congress Street and Austin Street. This replaced the previous speakeasy The Yellow Cab Club. After Slayton left, Dale Soffar then partnered with Bell. After Rex Bell left for Nashville, Tennessee in the 1970's, Dale Soffar was the sole owner. In 1979, the Old Quarter closed its Houston location.

In 1996, Rex opened the Old Quarter Acoustic Cafe in Galveston, Texas in the Strand Historic District. In 2016, Rex retired due to health problems. He sold the Old Quarter Acoustic Cafe to a past stage musician and patron, Joel Mora, and his wife Angela Mora. Rex is still considered the "Old Quarter's patron saint" as he continues to frequent the cafe, take part in events, and play acoustic open mic shows.
