= For the Sake of the Song (Townes Van Zandt album) =

Studio album by Townes Van Zandt
- Released: August 1968
- Recorded: April 1968
- Studios: Bradley's Barn, Mount Juliet, Tennessee
- Genre: Country
- Length: 34:43
- Labels: Poppy; Tomato/Rhino; Fat Possum
- Producers: Jack Clement, Jim Malloy

Townes Van Zandt chronology
For the Sake of the Song (1968)	Our Mother the Mountain (1969)

For the Sake of the Song is the debut studio album by country singer/songwriter Townes Van Zandt, released in 1968. The majority of the songs, including the title track, "Tecumseh Valley", "(Quicksilver Daydreams of) Maria", "Waitin' Around to Die", and "Sad Cinderella", were re-recorded in more stripped-down versions for subsequent studio albums.

== Background ==
For the Sake of the Song would be the flagship release on Poppy Records, a label operated by Keven Eggers, with whom Van Zandt would have a long and complex professional relationship. According to John Kruth's book To Live's To Fly: The Ballad of the Late, Great Townes Van Zandt, Eggers first heard Van Zandt's song "Tecumseh Valley" when producer Jack Clement played a demo of it recorded at a Houston recording studio in 1966, with Eggers marveling, "I thought it was an absolute classic song. When I heard it I said, 'This is a brilliant songwriter.' I told Jack right then and there that I would sign Townes and make a record with him. Townes was brilliant from day one." Clement, who had been an engineer for Sam Phillips at Sun Records and an established songwriter himself, offered to produce the album with Jim Malloy. Van Zandt, who had gained a small but devout following among the folk "purists" who attended his shows in coffeehouses and dive bars, agreed to travel to Nashville for the recording sessions. Although Nashville had become known as the epicenter of commercial country music, by the late 1960s it had also produced hit albums by artists in rock, pop, and folk circles, such as Blonde On Blonde, John Wesley Harding and Nashville Skyline by Bob Dylan, Bookends by Simon and Garfunkel, and Sweetheart of the Rodeo by the Gram Parsons-led incarnation of the Byrds.

== Recording ==
For listeners who had seen and heard Van Zandt perform his poetic songs solo with just an acoustic guitar, For the Sake of the Song came as somewhat of a shock, with John Kruth observing, "Instead of being the focal point of the album, Townes and his songs were lost in a Phil Spector-like 'Wall of Sound.'" Van Zandt's voice - already unconventional for mainstream country fans - is drenched in echo and surrounded with ethereal organs, medieval recorders and harpsichords, and the overproduction would lead the singer to rerecord many of the songs on his subsequent albums. In his biography on the singer, Kruth quotes producer Clement, who later recalled, "Townes was so different. He didn't fit the country profile. He was a unique songwriter, very poetical. 'The Silver Ships of Andilar' was more like a movie than a song...That first album was experimental. It's just how it fell into place at the time. I wasn't tryin' to do anything different from what I usually did. Townes wasn't too flappable. We just made everything work around him. I dunno...Maybe I overproduced it a little bit." Throughout his career, Van Zandt would maintain a flippant attitude towards recording, always more interested in songwriting itself, and was likely overawed by the charismatic Clement, who had produced Jerry Lee Lewis's smash hit "Whole Lotta Shakin' Goin' On" and written "Ballad of a Teenage Queen" for Johnny Cash. In the foreword to I'll Be Here In The Morning: The Songwriting Legacy of Townes Van Zandt, Clement wrote, "Townes was fun to work with, but he didn't think much of the recording process. He just wanted to have some action going." In the 1993 Rhino Records reissue of the album, Van Zandt is quoted, "I was awe stricken when I first went to Nashville. A young Texas folk singer suddenly surrounded by the best players, producers and engineers in the world. I sat in a chair and sang when they told me to. I love the record because it was my first." In the spring of 1994, Van Zandt elaborated to Aretha Sills: "Got a publishing company, made a record, For the Sake of the Song, and it’s now been re-released under the title The First Album. I like it, but I had to re-record about four of the songs, because I was just totally taken — not on purpose — but totally taken off guard. I was surrounded by ten of the best musicians in the world. Boy, and I’m a hick from Texas, you know? I’m a cowboy hippie from Texas and all of a sudden I’m playing these songs and I was just showing ‘em how they went and just playing. And then I realized toward the end of the record that that’s not how the song goes. That’s not how it was written, so on the next record I had veto power and listened and took equal charge." Before overdubs, Van Zandt recorded the basic tracks "live" at Bradley's Barn on a three-track recorder.

== Composition ==
For the Sake of the Song includes all Van Zandt originals and several of his best known works, including "Waiting Around To Die", a song the singer performs in the film Heartworn Highways. In the Van Zandt documentary Be Here To Love Me, the singer's first wife Fran reveals that Van Zandt wrote the song in a small walk-in closet, which he had turned into a makeshift studio, in their first apartment after the couple got married: "He would sit in there for hours. You'd have to remind him it was dinnertime to get him to come out. That was when he wrote 'Waiting Around to Die', which was the first song...I was twenty years old - a newly wed - and 'Waitin' Around to Die wasn't exactly...I was expecting a love ballad or something." The song chronicles the life of a fictional drifter as he passes sadly through the experiences of an abusive father, the abandonment of his mother, substance use disorders, fast women, and even prison. Van Zandt later explained to Paul Zollo in Songwriters on Songwriting, "I have to watch that when I do shows. I have to stay away from that side, because nobody wants to hear blues on blues on blues." The title track has also garnered much praise, with John Kruth writing that the song "reveals the complexity of an unrequited relationship burdened by the pitfall of desire. The lyric contains a sophisticated internal rhyme scheme that sings like a country song while reading like poetry on the page." "That's where my poetic background comes in," Van Zandt is quoted in Songwriters on Songwriting. "It seems a lot of people in Nashville write by phrase, or by the line. As opposed to writing by the word. A lot of my best songs are where every single word is where it's supposed to be...'For the Sake of the Song' was written by the word. I once sat down and wrote out the rhyme scheme for that song, and it was amazing. Pretty complex. But it didn’t seem that complex when I was writing it." On "Tecumseh Valley", a tragic song about a miner's daughter named Caroline, Van Zandt agreed to change the line "whoring out on the streets" to "walking in the streets" for the album at Clement's suggestion, who feared the lyric might be too offensive.

== Release & reception ==
For the Sake of The Song was released shortly before Christmas, 1968 to an indifferent public and a confused fan base. John Kruth notes in To Live's To Fly that "the overproduction of Van Zandt's music ultimately had a boomerang effect, alienating Townes's small but devoted following...who believed he was the genuine article, 'the Real Deal,' the last link in the long line of troubadours that stretched back to Woody Guthrie and Jimmie Rodgers." Kruth also quotes other friends and contemporaries of Van Zandt who expressed their disdain for the album's gaudiness, including Guy Clark and Mickey Newbury (who wrote the original album's liner notes). With the passing of time, however, a clear distinction has been made between the production and Van Zandt's poetic, often brilliant songwriting, with Mark Deming of AllMusic enthusing, "Townes Van Zandt wrote songs with an uncommon grace and poetic clarity, and he sang them with a voice that was at once straightforward, eloquent, and mindful of the arid beauty of his images...the album's production and arrangements occasionally suggest that Jack Clement and Jim Malloy didn't always know what to make of what he brought them." Although it could be argued that the production choices lean away from the singer's strengths, For the Sake of the Song remains a unique recording in the Van Zandt canon; in the liner notes to the Charly Records reissue of the album, the case is made that "Although ostensibly an acoustic recording, the utilization of drum and percussive sounds provides the album with an [sic] unique edge."

Many of the compositions on For the Sake of The Song have been covered by other artists. Some notable examples include "For the Sake of the Song", which was recorded by Azure Ray on their EP November and William Boyd Chisum on his 2006 album Chasing The Wind. "Tecumseh Valley" has been recorded by Bobby Bare, Nanci Griffith, Matthew Cook and Van Zandt disciple Steve Earle. "I'll Be There In The Morning" was recorded by George Hamilton IV on his 1980 album Forever Young and by Mark Dvorak on his 1992 album Use It Up, Wear It Out. "Waiting Around To Die" is one of the singer's most covered compositions, having been recorded by The Be Good Tanyas (whose version appears in the episode "Bit by a Dead Bee" in the second season of the hit TV series Breaking Bad as well as the video game The Walking Dead: The Final Season), Matt Cutillo, the Dead Raven Choir, Biana De Leon, Foreign Born, Frenchy Burrito, Pat Haney, Rhonda Harris and Helldorado. A duet of "Waiting Around to Die" featuring Van Zandt and Calvin Russell can be heard on The Best of Townes Van Zandt.

== Re-releases ==
For the Sake of The Song was re-released in 1993 on Tomato Records through Rhino Records under the altered title First Album. Fat Possum Records released the album in 2007 under its original title.

== Track listing ==
All tracks written by Townes Van Zandt.

1. "For the Sake of the Song" - 4:46
2. "Tecumseh Valley" - 2:43
3. "Many a Fine Lady" - 3:53
4. "(Quicksilver Daydreams of) Maria" - 3:42
5. "Waitin' Around to Die" - 2:24
6. "I'll Be There in the Morning" - 2:46
7. "Sad Cinderella" - 4:41
8. "The Velvet Voices" - 3:15
9. "All Your Young Servants" - 3:01
10. "Talkin' Karate Blues" - 3:09
11. "Sixteen Summers, Fifteen Falls" - 2:43

== Personnel ==
- Townes Van Zandt - guitar, vocals

Technical

- Val Valentin - director of engineering
- Mickey Newbury - liner notes
- Milton Glaser - art direction, cover design
