= To Live Is to Fly =

Song by Townes Van Zandt

from the album High, Low and In Between
- Released: December 1971
- Genre: country
- Length: 3:15
- Label: Poppy
- Songwriter: Townes Van Zandt

"To Live Is to Fly" is a song written by Townes Van Zandt. It was released in December 1971 on the album High, Low and In Between.

There is also a biography about Van Zandt titled, To Live's to Fly: The Ballad of the Late, Great Townes Van Zandt.

The song was covered by Wade Bowen on his album The Given. It was also covered by Cowboy Junkies on their album Black Eyed Man and by Scottish band Primal Scream.
