= Delta Momma Blues =

Studio album by Townes Van Zandt
- Released: October 1970
- Recorded: 1970
- Studios: Century Sound Studios, New York City
- Length: 32:55
- Label: Poppy
- Producers: Kevin Eggers, Ronald Frangipane

Townes Van Zandt chronology
Townes Van Zandt (1969)	Delta Momma Blues (1970)	High, Low and In Between (1971)

Professional ratings
Review scores
Source	Rating
AllMusic	4/5 stars

Delta Momma Blues is the fourth studio album by the country singer/songwriter Townes Van Zandt, released in 1970. Unlike his previous albums, which were influenced by Appalachian folk and country music and recorded in Nashville, this album was blues-influenced and recorded in New York City.

== Recording ==
Delta Momma Blues was recorded at Century Sound of Fifty-Second Street in New York, where Van Zandt lived for three years in the early seventies. It was produced by Van Zandt's manager Kevin Eggers and Ron Frangipane, a pianist and string arranger who had studied under Igor Stravinsky and had previously worked with the Monkees, Dusty Springfield, John Lennon and The Rolling Stones. "Townes was not involved in the recording process in the traditional sense," Frangipane explained to John Kruth in 2007. "Whereas someone like Janis Ian would micromanage every eighth note, Townes was more like, sitting back in an old easy chair with holes in it, playing his guitar on the day before the session, saying, 'Well, what are we gonna do?' He trusted that our reasoning was probably better than his, but he wanted to know where we were going. He was not just an 'I'll show up, play it, and go home' guy...He was very much a solo performer." Frangipane and engineer Brooks Arthur largely abandon the superfluous adornment that accompanied Van Zandt's first three albums, with the producer telling Kruth, "If I saw anything I could have done to get at least one crossover hit with Townes, I would have done it. But I never read him that way. Townes was essentially an American storyteller, like a guy sitting on a porch, talking to you."

== Composition ==
Delta Momma Blues includes some of Van Zandt's most heralded compositions, including the menacing "Rake" and the cautionary "Nothin'". Although many listeners assume that "Nothin'" is about drug addiction, Van Zandt explained in a 1995 Dutch television interview that he wrote it immediately after reading The Last Temptation of Christ by Nikos Kazantzakis. In October 1970, Van Zandt told WBAI DJ Ron Fass that he had written "Rake" in Wilmington, Delaware, after reading another novel by Kazantzakis, Saint Francis. "For me, 'Rake' is unforgettable," producer Frangipane marvels in the 2007 book To Live's To Fly: The Ballad of the Late, Great Townes Van Zandt. "When we finally nailed it, we knew it was the special moment on the album." Although these songs are particularly dark, the album does include several tender ballads rich with Van Zandt's poetic imagery, such as "Come Tomorrow" and "Tower Song". Reminiscing about the sorrowful "Tower Song" in the notes to the 1977 songbook For the Sake of the Song, the singer confesses, "I thought when I wrote 'Tower Song' that I was writing to someone else. Now I'm not sure that I wasn't writing it to me."

The album opener "FFV" was a remake of a traditional country song "Engine 143", originally credited to the Carter Family but supposedly written by a roundhouse worker in Hinton, West Virginia, just a short distance from the site of the crash described in the song. The blues "Brand New Companion" clearly shows the influence of Texas bluesman Lightnin' Hopkins, one of Van Zandt's musical heroes. The title track (with an alternate spelling from the album title) was the first collaboration to appear on one of Van Zandt's albums, having been co-written with Cado Parish Studdard and Matthew Moore (Van Zandt, always a loner, had co-written "Mister Can't You See" with Mickey Newbury, which appeared on Newbury's 1968 debut album Harlequin Melodies). As Van Zandt told Richard Wootton in 1977, "I wrote one song with two other guys when we were a trio, about eight years ago. We were called the Delta Mama Boys. I was a house act in this club in Austin. One of them was the manager of the club, the other guy was a good friend of mine. During the intermission, we'd do one (together). Just kid around, play some Woody Guthrie songs. That was our theme song - real light." Townes went on to reveal that the lyric had been inspired by a couple of soldiers he met in Oklahoma, who spent their weekends fortified by a particular brand of cough syrup - an elixir that contained dextromethorphan hydrobromide - which they nicknamed "Delta Mama" after the "DM" that appeared on the bottle.

== Reception ==
Delta Momma Blues was released in 1971. It was not a commercial success but reinforced the notion that Van Zandt was one of the premiere singer/songwriters of his generation. AllMusic opines, "On Van Zandt's fourth album his voice hasn't yet attained the weary gravitas that made his later albums so shattering, but his dark, skewed visions of life are already in place." The liner notes to the Charly Records reissue of the album state, "From the outset, the overall sound of Delta Momma Blues appears far cleaner that its predecessors, which may be due to the production work of Ron Frangipane and his engineer, Brooks Arthur," while noting that "Only Him Or Me" is "a Van Zandt specialty, underscored by gentle finger-picked guitar, with an appropriately understated organ appearing in the final verse." Biographer John Kruth singles out "Rake" for particular praise, writing in 2007, "The first note from Van Zandt's guitar fans out like a drop of blood dispersing in the water...The violins, which have betrayed him countless times in the past, are chilling, swelling into icy waves of sound. They suddenly recede, leaving Van Zandt and his guitar alone to tell a story, a tale dredged up from so deep within his sub-consciousness that Townes claimed not to understand its origin."

Many of the songs on Delta Momma Blues have been covered by other artists. "Nothin'" has been recorded by Dave Elias, Rowland S. Howard, Chris & Carla, Jeffery Foucault, Colter Wall, and Katie Jane Garside's band Ruby Throat on the 2009 album Out of a Black Cloud Came a Bird. It also appears on Raising Sand, the Grammy Award winning album by Robert Plant and Alison Krauss. "Rake" has been covered by Ben Demerath, Drunk, Barbara Gosza, and Rhonda Harris. Steve Earle includes four songs from Delta Momma Blues on his 2009 tribute Townes. Chris Buhalis included a version of "Where I Lead Me" on his 1998 album Kenai Dreams. "Brand New Companion" was covered by Johnny Dowd for a 2007 Van Zandt tribute album. Richard Dobson recorded "Turnstyled, Junkpiled" and "Come Tomorrow" for his 1994 album Amigos: Richard Dobson Sings Townes Van Zandt. Jad Fair also recorded "Turnstyled, Junkpiled" in 2009. Songwriter and Van Zandt disciple Nanci Griffith recorded "Tower Song" for the 2001 album Poet: A Tribute to Townes Van Zandt.

== Artwork ==
The photograph on the cover of Delta Momma Blues was taken in New York's East Village by Ken Beckles. It features Van Zandt leaning in a doorway with a copy of Peter S. Beagle's classic fantasy novel The Last Unicorn sticking out of one of the pockets of his suede jacket and a kissing couple huddling in the corner. On the back of the album a bespectacled Van Zandt stands alone on a dock holding a cigarette in one hand and a bottle in the other resembling, as biographer John Kruth put it in 2007, "a hip English professor on a summer bender."

== Track listing ==
All songs written by Townes Van Zandt, except where noted.

1. "FFV" (Traditional; arranged by Van Zandt) – 3:37
2. "Delta Mama Blues" (Van Zandt, Cado Parish Studdard, Matthew Moore) – 4:01
3. "Only Him or Me" – 2:32
4. "Turnstyled, Junkpiled" – 3:26
5. "Tower Song" – 4:10
6. "Come Tomorrow" – 2:59
7. "Brand New Companion" – 4:46
8. "Where I Lead Me" – 2:52
9. "Rake" – 4:07
10. "Nothin'" – 2:46

== Personnel ==
- Produced by Kevin Eggers and Ronald Frangipane
- Recorded and engineered by Brooks Arthur

== Covers ==
- "Turnstyled, Junkpiled" was covered by Richard Dobson and Jad Fair.
- "Brand New Companion" was covered by Johnny Dowd for a 2007 Van Zandt tribute album
- "Where I Lead Me" was covered by Chris Buhalis on his 1998 album Kenai Dreams.
- "Rake" was covered by Ben Demerath, Drunk, Barbara Gosza, Rhonda Harris, and Blood & Time.
- "Nothin'" was covered by Robert Plant and Alison Krauss on their 2007 album Raising Sand.
- "Nothin'" was covered by Rowland S. Howard on his 2009 album Pop Crimes.
- "Nothin'" was covered by Colter Wall on his 2015 EP Imaginary Appalachia.
- "Nothin'" was covered by Dutchguts in their split with Ubasute.
- "Delta Momma Blues" was covered by Hurray for the Riff Raff on their album My Dearest Darkest Neighbor.
