= The Ballad of Nora Lee =

Studio album by Helldorado
- Released: September 5, 2005
- Recorded: 2005
- Genre: Alternative country, country rock, garage rock, Americana
- Length: 45:58
- Label: Glitterhouse Records
- Producer: Helldorado & Eirik Lye

The Ballad Of Nora Lee is the third studio album from the Norwegian band Helldorado.

The album reflects a band that is fascinated and inspired by Americana music and subculture, combining elements from different genres.

The Turkish national football team chose Helldorado's "A Drinking Song" as their anthem for the Euro 2008 Championship. "A Drinking Song" was A-listed on Turkish TV channel "Dream-TV". It was achieved considerable exposure on the channel and was rated video of the week.

== Track listing ==
All songs by Dag S. Vagle, except "Helltown" and "A Drinking Song" (music by Vagle, lyrics by Vagle & Hans A. Wassvik); "Guitar Noir" (music by Vagle, lyrics by Wassvik); and "Waiting Around To Die" (music & lyrics by Townes Van Zandt).

1. "The Ballad of Nora Lee" – 5:02
2. "Just Like Fire" – 4:06
3. "Helltown" – 3:24
4. "The Black Winds" – 4:35
5. "Down to the Water" – 4:37
6. "Guitar Noir" – 3:46
7. "Rock Your Soul" – 3:47
8. "So Long Ago" – 3:35
9. "Honky Tonk Aliens" – 3:21
10. "A Drinking Song" – 3:21
11. "The Devil's Kiss" – 2:46
12. "Waiting Around to Die" – 3:38

== Personnel ==
=== Helldorado ===
- Dag S. Vagle: Vocal, Guitar, Banjo, Bouzouki, Piano, Harmonica
- Bård Halsne: Guitar, Glockenspiel, Backing Vocal
- Hans A. Wassvik: Bass, Zither
- Morten Jackman: Drums, Saw, Percussion

=== Guest musicians ===
- Ole Zweidorf - Violin (5,9)
- Rune Helland -- Pedal Steel (4), Lap Steel (12)
- Agne Saeverund -Organ (2,3,6,11)
- Didrick Ingvaldsen - Trumpet (5,8,10)
- Ry Krueger - Slide Guitar (6)
- The String Quartet - Strings (1,4,8)
- Bengt Olav Hansen - String arrangements (1,4,8)
