= Townes Van Zandt =

American singer-songwriter (1944–1997)

- Van Zandt in Heartworn Highways (1975)

Background information
- Born: John Townes Van Zandt; March 7, 1944; Fort Worth, Texas, U.S.
- Died: January 1, 1997 (aged 52) Smyrna, Tennessee, U.S.
- Genres: Progressive country; contemporary folk; country blues; Outlaw Country
- Occupation: Singer-songwriter
- Instruments: Guitar; vocals
- Years active: 1965–1996
- Labels: Poppy; Tomato; Sugar Hill; TVZ; Fat Possum
- Website: townesvanzandt.com

John Townes Van Zandt (March 7, 1944 – January 1, 1997) was an American singer-songwriter. He wrote numerous songs, such as "Pancho and Lefty", "If I Needed You", "Snake Mountain Blues", "Our Mother the Mountain", "Waitin' Round to Die", and "To Live's to Fly". His musical style has often been described as melancholic and features rich, poetic lyrics. During his early years, Van Zandt was respected for his guitar playing and fingerpicking ability.

Much of Van Zandt's life was spent touring bars, music clubs, colleges, folk venues, and festivals, often lodging in motel rooms or the homes of friends. He suffered from drug addiction and alcoholism, and was diagnosed with bipolar disorder. When he was young, the now-discredited insulin shock therapy erased much of his long-term memory.

In 1983, Willie Nelson and Merle Haggard covered and popularized Van Zandt's song "Pancho and Lefty", reaching number one on the Billboard country music chart. Van Zandt's influence has been cited by countless artists across multiple genres and his music has been recorded or performed by Bob Dylan, Willie Nelson, Lyle Lovett, Alison Krauss, Merle Haggard, Norah Jones, Emmylou Harris, Counting Crows, Steve Earle, Colter Wall, Billy Strings, Jason Isbell, Jason Molina, Michael Weston King, Doc Watson, Cowboy Junkies, Kurt Vile, and Terry Allen.

Van Zandt died on New Year's Day 1997 at the age of 52 from cardiac arrhythmia caused by health problems stemming from years of substance abuse. A revival of interest in Van Zandt blossomed in the 2000s. The decade saw the publication of two books, a documentary film (Be Here to Love Me), and numerous magazine articles about him.

== Biography ==
=== Early life ===
Born in Fort Worth, Texas, into a wealthy family, Van Zandt was a great-great-great-grandson of Isaac Van Zandt (a prominent leader of the Republic of Texas) and a great-great-grandnephew of K. M. Van Zandt (a major in the Confederate army and one of the founders of Fort Worth).

Townes' parents were Harris Williams Van Zandt and Dorothy Townes. He had two siblings, Bill (1949–2009) and Donna (1941–2011). Harris was a corporate lawyer and his career required the family to move several times during the 1950s and 1960s. In 1952, the family relocated from Fort Worth to Midland, Texas for six months before moving to Billings, Montana.

At Christmas in 1956, Townes's father gave him a guitar, which he practised while wandering the countryside. He later told an interviewer that "seeing Elvis Presley on the Ed Sullivan Show was the starting point for me becoming a guitar player... I just thought that Elvis had all the money in the world, all the Cadillacs and all the girls, and all he did was play the guitar and sing. That made a big impression on me." In 1958, the family moved to Boulder, Colorado. Van Zandt remembered his time in Colorado fondly and often visited it as an adult. He later referred to Colorado in "My Proud Mountains", "Colorado Girl", and "Snowin' on Raton". Townes was a good student and active in team sports. In grade school, he was found to have a high IQ, and his parents began grooming him to become a lawyer or senator. Fearing that his family would move again, he willingly decided to attend the Shattuck School in Faribault, Minnesota. He scored 1170 on the SAT in January 1962. His family soon moved to Houston, Texas.

In 1962, he enrolled at the University of Colorado Boulder, wrote poetry, and listened to records by Lightnin' Hopkins and Hank Williams. In the spring of his second year, his parents flew to Boulder to bring Townes back to Houston, worried about his binge drinking and episodes of depression. They admitted him to the University of Texas Medical Branch in Galveston, where he was diagnosed with manic depression. He received three months of insulin shock therapy, which erased much of his long-term memory. Afterwards, his mother said that her "biggest regret in life was that she had allowed that treatment to occur". In 1965, he was accepted into the University of Houston's pre-law program. Soon after, he attempted to join the Air Force, but was rejected because of a doctor's diagnosis that labelled him "an acute manic-depressive who has made minimal adjustments to life". After Townes's father died in January 1966 at age 52, he quit school and went on the road for the first time having been inspired by his singer-songwriter heroes to pursue a career in playing music.

=== Early musical career ===
In 1965, Van Zandt began playing regular shows at the Jester Lounge in Houston for $10 per night. After the Jester closed, he began to regularly perform (and occasionally live) at Sand Mountain Coffee House. In these Houston clubs, he met fellow musicians Lightnin' Hopkins, Guy Clark, Jerry Jeff Walker, and Doc Watson. His repertoire consisted mostly of covers of songs written by Hopkins, Bob Dylan, and others, as well as original novelty songs like "Fraternity Blues." In 1966, Harris Van Zandt encouraged his son to stop playing covers and write his own songs.

At one point around 1968, Van Zandt was roommates with 13th Floor Elevators singer Roky Erickson. Erickson suggested that he audition as the Elevators' new bassist, even though he was a guitarist who had never played bass before. When Tommy Hall found out he never played bass, he kicked him out of the audition.

In 1968, Van Zandt met songwriter Mickey Newbury in a Houston coffee shop. Newbury persuaded Van Zandt to go to Nashville, Tennessee, where he was introduced by Newbury to the man who became his longtime producer, "Cowboy" Jack Clement.

Van Zandt cited Lightnin' Hopkins, Bob Dylan, and Hank Williams and such varied artists as Muddy Waters, The Rolling Stones, Blind Willie McTell, Tchaikovsky, and Jefferson Airplane as having had a major impact on his music.

=== 1970s ===
The years between 1968 and 1973 proved to be his most prolific era. Van Zandt released six albums during the time period: For the Sake of the Song, Our Mother the Mountain, Townes Van Zandt, Delta Momma Blues, High, Low and In Between, and The Late Great Townes Van Zandt. Among the tracks written for these albums were "To Live Is to Fly", "Pancho and Lefty", and "If I Needed You". These songs eventually raised Van Zandt to near-legend status in American and European songwriting circles.

In 1972, he recorded tracks for an album with a working title of Seven Come Eleven, which remained unreleased for many years due to a dispute between his manager Kevin Eggers and producer Jack Clement. Eggers either could not or refused to pay for the studio sessions, so Clement erased the master tapes. However, before they were deleted, Eggers sneaked into the studio and recorded rough mixes of the songs on to a cassette tape. Tracks from the aborted Seven Come Eleven debacle later surfaced on The Nashville Sessions.

In 1975, Van Zandt was featured prominently in the documentary film Heartworn Highways with Guy Clark, Steve Earle, Steve Young, Gamble Rogers, Charlie Daniels and David Allan Coe. His segment of the film was shot at his run-down trailer home in Austin, Texas, where Van Zandt is shown drinking straight whiskey during the middle of the day, shooting and playing with guns, and performing the songs "Waitin' Around to Die" and "Pancho and Lefty." He was the only person in the film to play directly to the camera, and, according to Steve Earle, "stole that entire film." His soon-to-be second wife Cindy and dog Geraldine (a large, "keenly intelligent" half-wolf, half-husky) are featured in the film.

In 1977, Live at the Old Quarter, Houston, Texas was released. The album showcased Van Zandt solo at a 1973 concert before a small audience, and less elaborately produced than many of his early records. The album received positive reviews, and is considered by many to be among the best albums that the songwriter ever released.

In the mid-1970s, Van Zandt split from his longtime manager, Kevin Eggers. He found a new manager, John Lomax III (grandson of the famed folk music historian John Lomax), who set up a fan club for Van Zandt. Though the club was only advertised through small ads in the back of music magazines, Lomax immediately began to receive hundreds of impassioned letters from around the world written by people who felt touched by Van Zandt. Some of the letters described how his material often served as a crutch for those who were dealing with depression. In 1978, the singer fired Lomax and re-hired Eggers. He soon signed with Eggers' new label, Tomato Records. The following year, he recorded Flyin' Shoes; he did not release another album until 1987's At My Window. Despite critical acclaim, he remained a cult figure. He normally played small venues (often to crowds of fewer than fifty people) but began to move towards playing larger venues (and even made a handful of television appearances) during the 1990s. From 1976 onwards, he lived a reclusive life outside of Nashville in a tin-roofed, bare-boards shack with no heat, plumbing or telephone, occasionally appearing in town to play shows.

=== 1980s–1990s ===
Several of Van Zandt's compositions were recorded by other artists, such as Emmylou Harris who, with Don Williams, had a No. 3 country hit in 1981 with "If I Needed You," and Willie Nelson and Merle Haggard, the pair taking "Pancho and Lefty" to No. 1 on the country charts in 1983. Van Zandt had a small cameo appearance in the video for the song. In his later years, he recorded less frequently, his voice and singing style altered in part because of his drug addiction and alcoholism. However, he continued writing songs, such as "Marie" and "The Hole".

According to Susanna Clark, Van Zandt turned down repeated invitations to write with Bob Dylan. Dylan was reportedly a "big fan" of Townes and claimed to have all of his records; Van Zandt admired Dylan's songs, but didn't care for his celebrity. The two first met during a chance encounter outside a costume shop in the South Congress district of Austin, on June 21, 1986. According to Johnny Guess, Dylan later arranged another meeting with the songwriter. The Drag in Austin was shut down due to Dylan being in town; Van Zandt drove his motorhome to the cordoned-off area, after which Dylan boarded the vehicle and requested to hear him play several songs. In May and June 1990, he opened for the Cowboy Junkies during a two-month-long tour of the United States and Canada, which exposed him to a younger generation of fans. As a result, he wrote the song "Cowboy Junkies Lament" for the group, with a verse about each member of the band.

== Personal life ==
=== Relationships ===
Van Zandt married Fran Peterson on August 26, 1965; a son, John Townes "J.T." Van Zandt II, was born to them on April 11, 1969, in Houston. The couple divorced on January 16, 1970. He began dating Cindy Morgan in 1974 and they married in 1978. Cindy was 15 years old to Van Zandt's 30 when they met, though she initially hid her age from him. Van Zandt and Cindy became estranged for much of the early 1980s, and were divorced on February 10, 1983, in Travis County, Texas. They had no children.

Van Zandt's third marriage was to Jeanene Munsell. They met on December 9, 1980, at a memorial for John Lennon. When Townes' terminally-ill mother learned that he had impregnated Munsell, she told him, "You're going to do the right thing and honor that baby." He divorced his estranged second wife and married Munsell on March 14, 1983. Their first child, William Vincent, was born ten days later. Another child, Katie Belle, was born February 14, 1992. Van Zandt and Munsell divorced on May 2, 1994. However, the two remained close, and Jeanene was an executor of his estate.

Around the time of their April 1993 separation, Jeanene coaxed the musician into signing over the publishing rights of his back catalog and recording royalties to her and their children. Van Zandt's only source of income after making that change was money received from concert engagements and, even then, Van Zandt frequently visited his ex-wife and gave her the money in his pockets. Following their divorce in 1994, his only possessions were a 1989 GMC Truck with camper shell, a 1984 Honda Shadow motorcycle and a 1983 Starwind 22-foot boat named Dorothy. He also retained sole ownership of his family inheritance of ownership in oil lease and mineral rights.

At the time of his death, he had begun a long-distance relationship with a woman named Claudia Winterer from Darmstadt, Germany. The two met in November 1995 during a concert of his in Hanau, Germany. Van Zandt told friends, he planned on marrying Winterer, but the two never became engaged.

=== Addiction ===
Van Zandt was addicted to heroin and alcohol throughout his adult life. At times, he became drunk on stage and forgot the lyrics to his songs. At one point, his heroin habit was so intense that he offered Kevin Eggers the publishing rights to all of the songs on each of his first four albums for $20. At various points, his friends saw him shoot up not just heroin, but also cocaine, vodka, as well as a mixture of Bourbon and Coke. On at least one occasion, he shot up heroin in the presence of his son J.T., who was only eight years old at the time.

As a result of Van Zandt's constant drinking, Harold Eggers, Kevin's brother, was hired as his tour manager and 24-hour caretaker in 1976, a partnership that lasted for the rest of the singer's life. Although the musician was years older than he was, Eggers later said that Van Zandt was his "first child." His battles with addiction led him into rehab nearly a dozen times throughout the 1970s and 1980s. Medical records from his recovery centers indicate that he believed his drinking had become a problem around 1973, and that by 1982 he was drinking at least a pint of vodka daily. Doctors' notes reported: "He admits to hearing voices, mostly musical voices", and "Affect is blunted and mood is sad. Judgment and insight is impaired." At various times, he was prescribed the antidepressant Zoloft and the mood stabilizer lithium. The longest and final period of sobriety during his adult life was about a year in 1989 and 1990.

=== Death ===
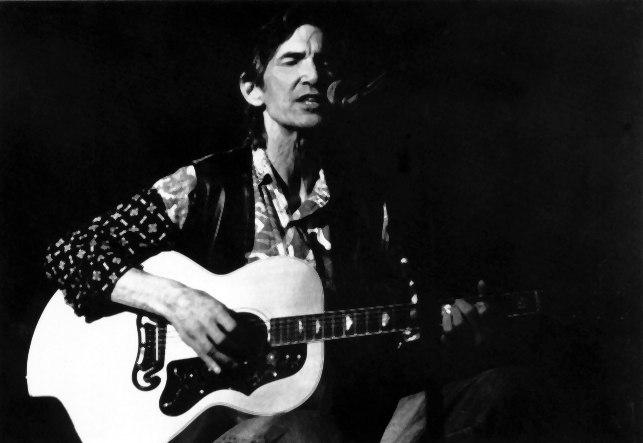
Townes Van Zandt at Kult, Niederstetten (1995)

Van Zandt continued writing and performing through the 1990s, though his output slowed noticeably. He had enjoyed some sobriety during the early 1990s, but actively abused alcohol during his final years. In 1994, he was admitted to the hospital to detox, when a doctor told Jeanene Van Zandt that trying to detox Townes again could potentially kill him. He grew increasingly frail during the mid-1990s, with friends noting that he seemed to have "withered."

In early 1996, he was contacted by Sonic Youth's Steve Shelley, who informed Van Zandt that he was interested in recording and releasing an album for him on the band's Ecstatic Peace label, funded by Geffen. Van Zandt agreed, and sessions were scheduled to begin in Memphis during late December of that year. On December 19 or 20, Van Zandt fell down the concrete stairs outside his home, badly injuring his hip. After lying outside for an hour, he dragged himself inside and called his ex-wife Jeanene, who sent friends Royann and Jim Calvin to check on him. He told the couple that he had sustained the injury while getting out of bed, and refused medical treatment. They took him back to their home, and he spent Christmas week on their couch, unable to get up even to use the bathroom.

Determined to finish the album that he had scheduled to record with Shelley and Two Dollar Guitar, Van Zandt arrived at the Memphis studio being pushed in a wheelchair by road manager Harold Eggers. Shelley canceled the sessions due to the songwriter's erratic behavior and drunkenness. Van Zandt finally agreed to hospitalization, but not before returning to Nashville. By the time he consented to receive medical care, eight days had passed since the injury. On December 31, X-rays revealed that Van Zandt had an impacted left femoral neck fracture in his hip, and several corrective surgeries were performed. Jeanene informed the surgeon that one of Townes's previous rehab doctors had told her detoxing could kill him. The medical staff tried to explain to her that detoxing a "late-term alcoholic" at home would be ill-advised, and he would have a better chance at recovering under hospital supervision. She did not heed the warnings, and checked Townes out of the hospital. Understanding that he would most likely drink immediately after leaving the hospital, the physicians refused to prescribe him any painkillers.

By the time Van Zandt was checked out of the hospital early the next morning, he had begun to show signs of delirium tremens. Jeanene rushed him to her car, where she gave him a flask of vodka to ward off the withdrawal delirium. She later reported that after getting him back home to Smyrna, Tennessee, and giving him alcohol, he became "lucid, in a real good mood, calling his friends on the phone." Jim Calvin shared a marijuana joint with him, and he was also given about four Tylenol PM tablets.

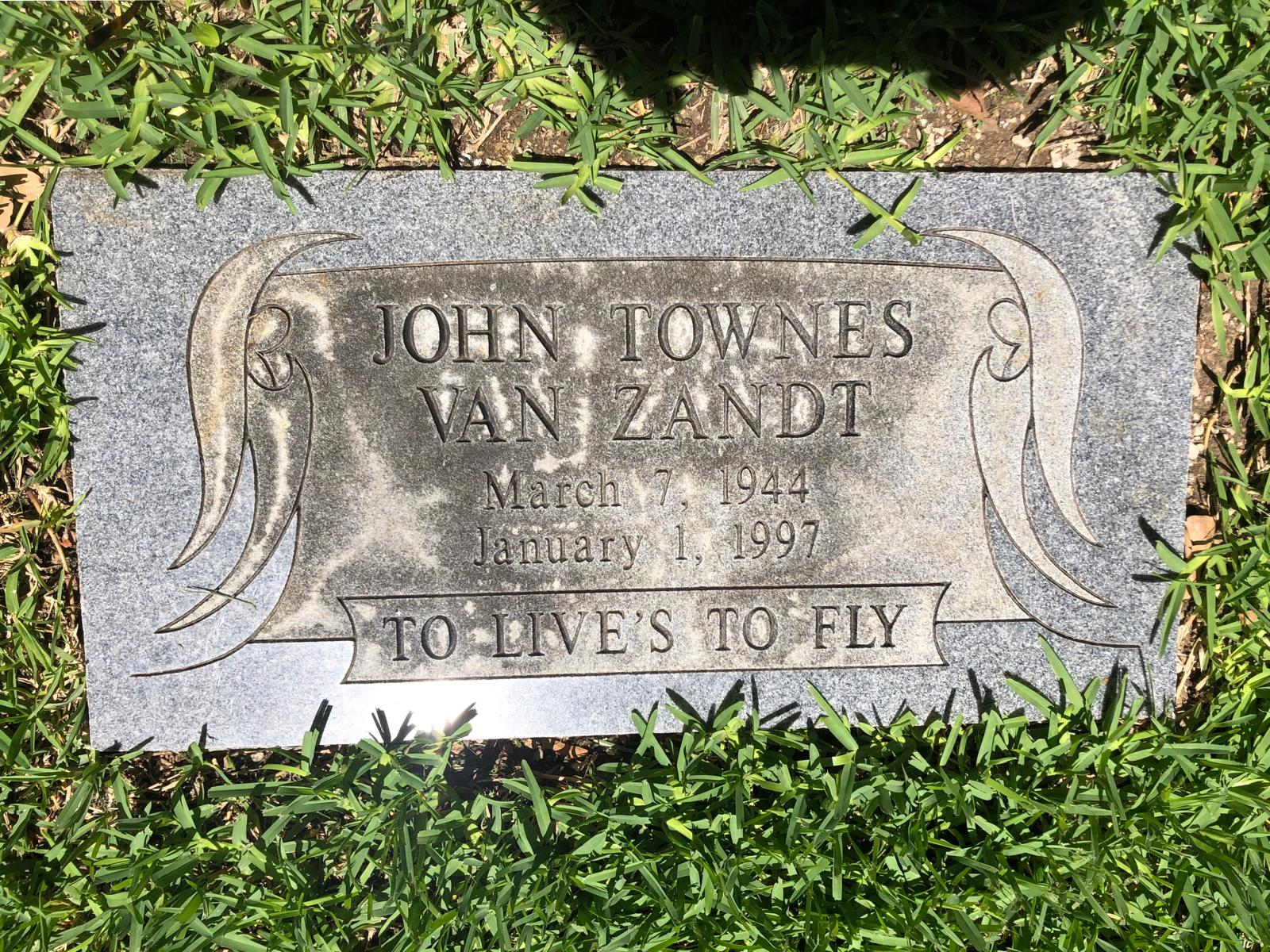
Townes Van Zandt's headstone in Dido, Texas

While Jeanene was on the phone with Susanna Clark, their son Will noticed that Townes had stopped breathing and "looked dead", and alerted his mother, who attempted to perform CPR, "screaming his name between breaths". Townes Van Zandt died in the early morning hours of January 1, 1997, at the age of 52. His official cause of death was "natural" cardiac arrhythmia.

Two services were held for Van Zandt: one in Texas for family, and another in a large Nashville church, attended by friends, acquaintances, and fans. Some of his ashes were placed underneath a headstone in the Van Zandt family plot at the Dido Cemetery in Dido, Texas, near Fort Worth.

== Legacy ==
=== Legal issues over his work ===
In the years immediately following Van Zandt's death, his former manager and label owner Kevin Eggers issued 14 albums of both new and previously unreleased material by the singer, all without consent of his estate (represented by Jeanene Van Zandt and his three children). Eggers claimed a 50% interest in eighty of Van Zandt's songs. After nearly ten years of legal battles, the court sided with the estate, issuing "injunctive relief against Eggers, restraining him from reproducing or distributing any of Van Zandt's songs."

It was revealed through these proceedings that Van Zandt's annual income in the years before his death had climbed to over $100,000, thanks in large part to the royalties accrued from his songs being covered by Willie Nelson, Emmylou Harris, Lyle Lovett, Merle Haggard, Cowboy Junkies, and other major music stars. After Van Zandt's death his road manager, Harold Eggers, released video and audio recordings from the songwriter's concerts. An out-of-court settlement in 2006 granted the Van Zandts conditional control of Harold Eggers' mastered recordings with Eggers retaining a 50% ownership of seven albums and some royalties for the remaining recordings.

On October 21, 2008, a number of Van Zandt's personal possessions were auctioned off at The Northside in Akron, Ohio at a benefit for Rex "Wrecks" Bell. Bell was a close friend and bandmate, and the inspiration for the song "Rex's Blues". Bell was also part owner of the bar Old Quarter in Houston, where Van Zandt performed the songs that would comprise the album Live at the Old Quarter.

=== In music ===
Van Zandt has been referred to as a cult musician and "a songwriter's songwriter." Musician Steve Earle, who met him in 1972 and considered Van Zandt a mentor, once called Van Zandt "the best songwriter in the whole world and I'll stand on Bob Dylan's coffee table in my cowboy boots and say that." The quote was printed on a sticker featured on the packing of At My Window, much to Van Zandt's displeasure. In the years following, the quote was often cited by the press, much to Van Zandt and Earle's embarrassment; in 2009, Earle told the New York Times "Did I ever believe that Townes was better than Bob Dylan? No." But he concluded at the end of the same article that, "As a songwriter, you won't find anybody better." Earle has championed the songwriter on a number of occasions: his eldest son, Justin Townes Earle, also a musician, was named after Van Zandt. Steve Earle wrote the song "Fort Worth Blues" as a tribute to the singer in the late 1990s, and in 2009 released an album titled Townes, which featured all covers of Van Zandt songs.

His Texas-grounded impact stretched farther than country. He has been cited as a source of inspiration by such notable artists as Bob Dylan, Neil Young, Willie Nelson, Guthrie Thomas, John Prine, Lyle Lovett, Chelsea Wolfe, Scott Avett of The Avett Brothers, Emmylou Harris, Nanci Griffith, Cowboy Junkies, Vetiver, Guy Clark, Devendra Banhart, Norah Jones, Robert Plant & Alison Krauss, The Be Good Tanyas and Jolie Holland, Rowland S. Howard, Michael Weston King, Hayes Carll, Josh Ritter, Jewel (who named her son Kase Townes Murray), Gillian Welch, Garth Brooks, Simon Joyner, Conor Oberst of Bright Eyes, Caleb Followill of Kings of Leon, Marissa Nadler, Laura Marling, and Frank Turner, Folk musician Shakey Graves has credited his fast-paced, rhythmic style of finger picked guitar playing partially to Van Zandt's influence.

In 1994, Israeli singer David Broza performed with Van Zandt during a Writers in the Round concert in Houston. When Van Zandt died, he left a shoe box full of unreleased poems and lyrics with a request that Broza set them to music. The resulting album was Night Dawn: The Unpublished Poetry of Townes Van Zandt.

In 2012, Van Zandt was inducted into the Texas Heritage Songwriters Hall of Fame.

In July 2012, Neurot Recordings released a three-way split album in tribute to Van Zandt, featuring Neurosis singer/guitarists Scott Kelly, Steve Von Till and doom/stoner metal legend Scott "Wino" Weinrich. Two years later another similar album was released featuring John Baizley, Mike Scheidt and Nate Hall, frontmen of the bands Baroness, YOB and U.S. Christmas respectively.

On June 18, 2015, Van Zandt was inducted into the second year's ceremony of the Austin City Limits Hall of Fame, along with Asleep at the Wheel, Loretta Lynn, Guy Clark and Flaco Jimenez. Gillian Welch inducted Van Zandt by telling stories about how he had come to her early gigs in Nashville and how he had bolstered her confidence in writing sad songs.

In an interview with The Guardian in 2016, Van Zandt was cited as being an influence to the American avant-garde metal group Neurosis.

In 2016, Paal Flaata released an album of only Van Zandt songs, Come Tomorrow – Songs of Townes Van Zandt. A single with the track "Come Tomorrow", where Paal Flaata sings with his daughter Maia Flaata, was released the same year.

=== In film and television ===
Van Zandt's Roadsongs album version of The Rolling Stones' "Dead Flowers" was used during the final scene of the Coen Brothers' 1998 film The Big Lebowski. The song was included on the movie's soundtrack. Since his death, Van Zandt's recordings have been licensed by his family for use in a number of films and television programs, including Stepmom, Ozark, Six Feet Under, In Bruges, Calvary, Crazy Heart, Leaves of Grass, Seven Psychopaths, Deadwood, Breaking Bad, Billions, Patriot, True Detective, Euphoria (American TV series), and Hell or High Water (Dollar Bill Blues). His "Buckskin Stallion Blues" was featured in the 2017 American film Three Billboards Outside Ebbing, Missouri both as his original recording and a cover by Amy Annelle.

The 2012 documentary film Low & Clear, which revolves around Van Zandt's son JT fly fishing for steelhead in British Columbia with his old fishing buddy Xenie, features Van Zandt's songs.

=== Films and book ===
In 2004, the film Be Here to Love Me, chronicling the artist's life and musical career, was released in the United States. It was very well received, earning a 94% rating on Rotten Tomatoes. Georgia Christgau of the Village Voice called the documentary "sympathetic but frank." Eddie Cockrell of Variety called the film "a dignified and wistful look at the unusual life, difficult career and lasting influence" of Van Zandt.

A biography, titled To Live's to Fly: The Ballad of the Late, Great Townes Van Zandt by John Kruth, was released in 2007. It received mixed reviews, with Publishers Weekly lamenting that Kruth's "efforts are diminished by oddly alternating first- and third-person narratives, awkward transitions and text cluttered with excessive quotes... more insight into why – rather than countless tales of how – would have made this bio a more worthwhile read."

In April 2008, the University of North Texas Press published Robert Earl Hardy's biography on the songwriter, titled A Deeper Blue: The Life and Music of Townes Van Zandt, which took more than eight years of research, including interviews with Mickey Newbury, Jack Clement, Guy and Susanna Clark, Mickey White, Rex Bell, Dan Rowland, Richard Dobson, John Lomax III, Van Zandt's brother and sister, cousins, his three ex-wives, and many others. The book has been described by Kirkus Reviews as a "poignant, clear and vivid portrait."

I'll Be Here in the Morning: The Songwriting Legacy of Townes Van Zandt by Brian T. Atkinson was released on New Year's Day 2012 by Texas A&M University Press, coinciding with the 15th anniversary of Van Zandt's death. The book contains interviews with longtime Van Zandt friends Guy Clark, Billy Joe Shaver, Ray Wylie Hubbard, Kris Kristofferson, Tom Russell and Peter Rowan as well as younger disciples such as Scott Avett (the Avett Brothers), Jim James (My Morning Jacket), Kasey Chambers, Josh Ritter, and Grace Potter.

Van Zandt was portrayed by Charlie Sexton in the 2018 film Blaze, a biographical drama about the life of Blaze Foley.

More books and movies about Townes Van Zandt were released, e.g. Harold Eggers' My Years with Townes Van Zandt and Mickey White's Another Mickey. Ruminations of a Texas Guitar Slinger (books) or Without Getting Killed or Caught (movie, director: Tamara Saviano).

Townes Van Zandt features prominently in I'll Be Here in the Morning author Brian T. Atkinson's subsequent books Looks Like Rain: The Songwriting Legacy of Mickey Newbury (Texas A&M University Press, 2021) and Love at the Five and Dime: The Songwriting Legacy of Nanci Griffith (TAMU Press, 2024).

== Discography ==
=== Studio albums ===
- For the Sake of the Song (1968)
- Our Mother the Mountain (1969)
- Townes Van Zandt (1969)
- Delta Momma Blues (1971)
- High, Low and In Between (1971)
- The Late Great Townes Van Zandt (1972)
- Flyin' Shoes (1978)
- At My Window (1987)
- The Nashville Sessions (1993)
- No Deeper Blue (1994)

=== Posthumous albums ===
- A Far Cry from Dead (1999)
- Texas Rain: The Texas Hill Country Recordings (2001)
- In the Beginning (2003)
- Sunshine Boy: The Unheard Studio Sessions & Demos 1971–1972 (2013)
- Sky Blue (2019)
- Somebody Had to Write It (2020)

=== Singles ===
- "Waiting Around to Die" / "Talking Karate Blues" (1968)
- "Second Lovers Song" / "Tecumseh Valley" (1969)
- "Come Tomorrow" / "Delta Mama Blues" (1971)
- "Greensboro Woman" / "Standin'" (1972)
- "If I Needed You" / "Sunshine Boy" (1972)
- "Honky Tonkin'" / "Snow Don't Fall" (1972)
- "Fraulein" / "Don't Let the Sunshine Fool Ya" (1972)
- "Pancho and Lefty" / "Heavenly Houseboat Blues" (1972)
- "Pancho and Lefty" / "If I Needed You" (1973)
- "Who Do You Love" / "Dollar Bill Blues" (1978)
- "When She Don't Need Me" / "No Place to Fall" (1978)
- "Dead Flowers" / "Fraulein" / "Racing in the Street" (1993) – German CD single
- "Riding the Range" / "Dirty Old Town" (1996)
- "Ain't Leavin' Your Love" (1999) – US CD single
- "Snowin' on Raton" (2001) – US CD single; from Texas Rain: The Texas Hill Country Recordings
- "Highway Kind" (2002) – CD single

=== Live albums ===
- Live at the Old Quarter, Houston, Texas (1977) – recorded July 1973
- Live and Obscure (1987) – recorded 1985
- Down Home & Abroad (2018) – recorded 1985/1993
- Rain on a Conga Drum: Live in Berlin (1991) – recorded October 1990
- Rear View Mirror (1993) – recorded in Oklahoma, 1978
- Roadsongs (1993) – all cover songs, recorded late 1970s & early 1980s
- Abnormal (1996) – reissued in 1998 with 3 tracks replaced
- The Highway Kind (1997)
- Documentary (1997)
- Last Rights (1997) – alternate version of Documentary
- Together at the Bluebird Café (2001) – with Guy Clark and Steve Earle; recorded September 1995
- In Pain (1999) – recorded 1994/1996
- Live at McCabe's (2001) – recorded February 1995
- A Gentle Evening with Townes Van Zandt (2002) – recorded November 1969
- Absolutely Nothing (2002) – recorded 1991–1996
- Acoustic Blue (2003) – recorded 1994/1996
- Live at the Jester Lounge, Houston, Texas, 1966 (2004)
- Rear View Mirror, Volume 2 (2004) – recorded 1977–80; album credits erroneously state 1976–79
- Live at Union Chapel, London, England (2005) – recorded April 1994
- Houston 1988: A Private Concert (2005)

=== Videos ===
- Heartworn Highways (1981)
- Be Here to Love Me (2004)
- Houston 1988: A Private Concert (2004)
- Townes Live in Amsterdam (2008) – recorded November 2, 1991

=== Compilations ===
Title	Album details
Last Rights: The Life & Times of Townes Van Zandt	Release date: June 10, 1997; Label: Gregor Records
Masters	Release date: November 30, 1997; Label: Eagle Rock Records
Anthology: 1968–1979	Release date: August 25, 1998; Label: Charly Records
The Best of Townes Van Zandt	Release date: July 1, 1999; Label: Charly Records
Drama Falls Like Teardrops	Release date: January 1, 2002; Label: Snapper Records
The Very Best of Townes Van Zandt: The Texan Troubadour	Release date: June 25, 2002; Label: Metro Records
Singer Songwriter	Release date: October 1, 2002; Label: MI Plus
Texas Troubadour	Release date: November 5, 2002; Label: Snapper Records
The Great Tomato Singer/Songwriter Collection	Release date: February 25, 2003; Label: Tomato Music
Legend	Release date: October 14, 2003; Label: Snapper Records
Buckskin Stallion	Release date: May 23, 2006; Label: ATOM Records
Sunshine Boy: The Unheard Studio Sessions & Demos	Release date: February 5, 2013; Label: Omnivore Recordings

== See also ==
- List of people with bipolar disorder

Awards
Preceded by Mickey Newbury	AMA presidents Award; 2007	Succeeded by Jerry Garcia
