= For the Sake of the Song =

For the Sake of the Song may refer to:

- For the Sake of the Song (Townes Van Zandt album), 1968, or its title track
- For the Sake of the Song (The Corbin/Hanner Band album), 1981, or its title track
