= Dido, Texas =

- Ghost town
- Location within Texas Location within the United States
- Coordinates: 32°57′05″N 97°29′08″W
- Country: United States
- State: Texas
- County: Tarrant
- Established: 1848
- Time zone: UTC-6 (Central (CST))
  - Summer (DST): UTC-5 (CDT)
- GNIS feature ID: 2034343

Dido is a ghost town in Tarrant County, Texas. It is located 16 miles northwest of Fort Worth on the eastern shore of Eagle Mountain Lake. The town was deserted primarily because it was bypassed by the arrival of railroads in the 1890s.

== History ==
The town of Dido was founded in 1848 and named after the mythological queen of Carthage. Its post office was built In 1888.

In the 1890s, the Texas and Pacific Railway and Fort Worth and Denver City Railway built their rail development through Saginaw, instead of Dido, leading to a decrease in population.

In 1894, K. M. Van Zandt donated a portion of land to build a schoolhouse, church, and the Dido Cemetery. The modern-day Dido Methodist Church houses a community center and hosts meetings of a local women's organization. Residents host "Dido Days" on the last Sunday in April each year, at the cemetery.
