= Our Mother the Mountain =

Studio album by Townes Van Zandt
- Released: April 1969
- Recorded: January, 1969, Nashville
- Genres: Country, folk
- Length: 40:18
- Label: Poppy
- Producers: Kevin Eggers, Jim Malloy, Jack Clement

Townes Van Zandt chronology
For the Sake of the Song (1968)	Our Mother the Mountain (1969)	Townes Van Zandt (1969)

Professional ratings
Review scores
Source	Rating
Allmusic	4/5 stars

Our Mother the Mountain is the second studio album by country singer/songwriter Townes Van Zandt, released in 1969. It is considered to be one of his greatest recordings and features some of his best known works, including "Be Here To Love Me", "Snake Mountain Blues" and "Our Mother The Mountain".

== Recording and reception ==
The basic tracks for Our Mother the Mountain were recorded in Los Angeles with overdubs recorded in Nashville. The album was produced by Jack Clement and Jim Malloy, who produced Van Zandt's first album For the Sake of The Song, and Kevin Eggers, who ran Poppy Records and also managed Van Zandt. Several big name musicians played on the album, including James Burton (famed for playing behind Ricky Nelson and Elvis Presley) and renowned session player Charlie McCoy. "Tecumseh Valley", which had appeared on the singer's debut album, was re-recorded for Our Mother the Mountain as a result of Van Zandt's dissatisfaction with the garish production employed on For the Sake of the Song. Although the tracks on Our Mother the Mountain were sweetened in Nashville, there was a somewhat simpler, light-handed approach taken production-wise on his follow-up LP.

Like most albums released during his lifetime, Our Mother the Mountain did not sell in great numbers but reinforced his reputation as a "songwriter's songwriter". In the 2004 biopic Be Here To Love Me (its title taken from the opening track on Our Mother the Mountain), musician Joe Ely recalls first hearing the album after Van Zandt had given him a copy when they first crossed paths in Lubbock, Texas when Ely picked the singer up hitchhiking back to Houston from San Francisco in 1971. Van Zandt was carrying only his guitar and a backpack stuffed with records and, as a means of thanking Ely, gave him a brand-new copy of Our Mother the Mountain. "I'd never met anybody who'd actually recorded an album before," Ely remembered, "and I take the record back to Jimmie Gilmore. We put the record on and we're just mesmerized by it. Ends up we played that record over and over for weeks. It made us rethink what we were doing and what a song was all about." In the book To Live's To Fly: The Ballad of the Late, Great Townes Van Zandt, John Kruth describes the title track as "otherworldly. Like the best of Van Zandt's dark sagas, this tale of a bewitched lover is a minor-key waltz that limps along like foreboding footsteps approaching in the hall, coming closer, closer, closer, as the song slowly envelops you." AllMusic writes that, "'St. John the Gambler' is the kind of hopeless, poetic love ballad Van Zandt does so well, with an aching melody that would have sounded better without the sappy strings," and notes that the best tracks "are bunched up at the end of the album and only add minimal touches to Van Zandt's moaning delivery and sparse picking."

Mark Lager, on the album's 50th anniversary in 2019, wrote that Our Mother the Mountain and Townes Van Zandt's self-titled album are "the strongest of his entire career since they contained compositions written solely by Van Zandt himself, whereas his later albums would frequently feature multiple covers of older blues and country singers. “Tecumseh Valley” is a heartbreaking reminiscence of a miner's daughter in Depression-era Oklahoma who earns low wages at a bar and, after the death of her father, is forced into prostitution and an early demise. “Our Mother the Mountain” is a dark ballad of a sinister and spooky Lorelei, a siren, accompanied by the forlorn flute of Jules Jacob. Bergen White's shivering strings accent the atmospheres in the autumnal and wintry desolation of the songs “Kathleen“, “Second Lovers Song”, and “St. John the Gambler”."

== Artwork ==
The artwork for Our Mother the Mountain was designed by Milton Glaser and the album cover features an arresting shot of Van Zandt taken by Allen Vogel. Glaser explained to John Kruth in 2007, "The album cover...was about provoking people's interest. To get them to ask, 'What the hell is that?' Either they got it or they didn't. If they didn't know who Townes was, his name wouldn't mean anything if they were compelled to buy it. These were basically cult records bought by a small group of passionate people." In the liner notes to the Charly Records reissue of the album, it is noted that, "In a way, Vogel's camera-created image sums up the contents of this album: eleven original songs of survival and sorrow, whose main lyrical focus is the pursuit of that elusive commodity, love that will endure."

== Cover versions ==
Many of the songs on Our Mother The Mountain have been covered by other artists. Karl Broadie recorded "Like a Summer Thursday" on his 2004 album Everybody's Gold. Dick Curless first recorded "Be Here to Love Me" on his 1965 LP Tombstone Every Mile and the song appears on the 2006 album Dust to Shake by Corazon. Paul Flaata covered "Second Lover Song" on his album In Demand in 2002. A rendition of "Our Mother the Mountain" performed by Great Lake Swimmers was included on the 2009 album Introducing Townes Van Zandt Via The Great Unknown. "Tecumseh Valley" has been recorded by Bobby Bare, Nanci Griffith, Matthew Cook and Van Zandt disciple Steve Earle. The Walkabouts recorded "Snake Mountain Blues" on their 1993 album New West Motel and Colter Wall recorded it on his 2017 self-titled album. "Kathleen" has been recorded by Rhonda Harris on their 2006 tribute album Tell The World We Tried; Van Zandt re-recorded the song in the early 1990s with The Chromatics providing vocal harmonies, this version was released posthumously on the 2001 album Texas Rain. "Kathleen" was also covered and released as a non-album single by Tindersticks in 1994. Norah Jones covered "Be Here to Love Me" on her Feels Like Home LP. The Wainwright Sisters covered "Our Mother the Mountain" on their 2015 album Songs in the Dark.

== Track listing ==
All tracks written by Townes Van Zandt

Side one
No.	Title	Length
1.	"Be Here to Love Me"	2:38
2.	"Kathleen"	2:47
3.	"She Came and She Touched Me"	4:03
4.	"Like a Summer Thursday"	3:04
5.	"Our Mother the Mountain"	4:22
6.	"Second Lovers Song"	2:16

Side two
No.	Title	Length
7.	"St. John the Gambler"	3:06
8.	"Tecumseh Valley"	4:55
9.	"Snake Mountain Blues"	2:39
10.	"My Proud Mountains"	5:04
11.	"Why She's Acting This Way"	5:24
Total length:		40:18

== Personnel ==
- Townes Van Zandt - vocals, guitar
- Ben Bernay - harmonica
- James Burton - Dobro, guitar
- John Clauder - drums
- David Cohen - guitar
- Chuck Domanico - bass
- Jack Clement - guitar
- Charlie McCoy - bass, guitar, harmonica, organ, recorder
- Lyle Ritz - bass
- Don Randi - keyboards
- Harvey Newmark - bass
- Mike Deasy - guitar
- Donald Frost - drums
- Jules Jacob - flute
- Bergen White - string arrangements
- Donnie Owens - contractor

Technical

- Charlie Tallent - engineer
- Milton Glaser - design
- Allen Vogel - cover photography
