= Be Here to Love Me =

2004 film by Margaret Brown

- Poster
- Directed by: Margaret Brown
- Produced by: Margaret Brown; Sam Brumbaugh
- Starring: Townes Van Zandt; Joe Ely; Guy Clark; Willie Nelson; Kris Kristofferson; Steve Earle
- Cinematography: Lee Daniel
- Edited by: Michael Taylor; Karen Skloss; Don Howard
- Music by: Jonathan McHugh
- Distributed by: Palm Pictures
- Release dates: September 13, 2004 (Toronto International Film Festival); April 3, 2005 (Wisconsin Film Festival); December 2, 2005 (U.S. limited)
- Running time: 100 mins
- Country: United States
- Language: English

Be Here To Love Me: A Film About Townes Van Zandt is a 2004 documentary film directed by Margaret Brown which chronicles the often turbulent life of American singer-songwriter Townes Van Zandt. The film includes interviews of Van Zandt's immediate family and contemporaries such as Willie Nelson, Kris Kristofferson, Emmylou Harris, Lyle Lovett, Steve Earle and Guy Clark along with "home movies, old TV performances and, especially, mid-Seventies footage originally filmed by James Szalapski for his outlaw country documentary Heartworn Highways."

== Synopsis ==
Townes Van Zandt was a well-regarded and influential musician and songwriter. The film follows his life as an artist, and documents the impressions he made on other musicians, his commitment to a mental facility, involvement in music, drugs and alcohol, departure from his family, several of his live performances, and general life on the road.

The film covers some of Van Zandt's time spent in Houston, Texas, where he began his musical development, though according to the film's DVD commentary, much was excluded from the early years, when he met many of his early influences and lifelong friends (Lightnin' Hopkins, Guy Clark, Steve Earle, Mickey Newbury, etc.), and developed his musical skills in the city's folk and country scene in the late 60s and early 70s.

== Release ==
Be Here to Love Me was first premiered at the Toronto International Film Festival in Toronto, Ontario, Canada in 2004. It first showed in the United States at the Wisconsin Film Festival, then to a limited run of theaters in 2005. The film was released on DVD by Palm Pictures in 2006.

== Reviews ==
The film maintains a 93% rating on Rotten Tomatoes. The New York Times said, "Margaret Brown has directed a tender, impressionistic film biography about the Texan singer-songwriter," and The Village Voice called it "loving but frank."

Be Here To Love Me was listed at #7 in a list of "50 Greatest Music Films Ever" in TimeOut Magazine.
