= Helldorado (band) =

Alternative country rock band from Norway

- Origin: Stavanger, Norway
- Genres: Alternative country, Gothic country, Americana
- Years active: 2000 – present
- Label: Checkpoint Charlie Audio Productions (CCAP)
- Members: Dag Vagle – Vocals, Guitar; Hans Wassvik – Bass, Backing Vocals; Morten Jackman – Drums, Backing Vocals
- Website: www.helldorado.no

Helldorado is an alternative country rock band from Norway. They draw inspiration from a wide variety of sources, including Spaghetti Western, film noir, Gothic country/cowpunk/country rock/Americana, garage rock, surf rock, psychobilly/gothabilly, and Tex-Mex/mariachi. The band is virtually unknown in the United States, but they have a strong fanbase in their home country and Turkey.

== Discography ==
=== Albums ===
- Lost Highway (Helldorado album)|Lost Highway (2002) (EP)
- Director's Cut (2004)
- The Ballad of Nora Lee (2005)
- Sinful Soul (2009)
- Bones In The Closet (2012) (single, vinyl and digital)
- Bones In The Closet (2013) (album, cd, vinyl and digital)
