= At My Window (album) =

Studio album by Townes Van Zandt
- Released: March 31, 1987
- Studio: Cowboy Arms (Nashville, Tennessee)
- Genre: Country, folk
- Length: 33:20
- Label: Sugar Hill
- Producer: Jack Clement, Jim Rooney

Townes Van Zandt chronology
| Flyin' Shoes (1978) | At My Window (1987) | Live and Obscure (1987) |

At My Window is the eighth studio album released by folk/country singer-songwriter Townes Van Zandt in 1987. This was Van Zandt's first studio album in the nine years that followed 1978's Flyin' Shoes, and his only studio album recorded in the 1980s.

== Recording ==
By the middle 1980s, with royalties coming in for "If I Needed You" (a No. 3 country hit for Emmylou Harris and Don Williams in 1981) and "Pancho and Lefty" (a No. 1 country smash for Willie Nelson and Merle Haggard in 1983), Van Zandt was enjoying what was for him a stable home life for the first time with his third wife Jeanene and their new son Will. He also acquired a keen interest in boating.

Nine years after releasing his last album, Van Zandt returned to the studio with producer "Cowboy" Jack Clement, Jim Rooney and a group of top shelf musicians, including fiddle and mandolin player Mark O'Connor and Willie Nelson's harmonica player Mickey Raphael, who all complement Van Zandt's subtle, poetic songs. Clement later told Van Zandt's biographer John Kruth that he felt At My Window was the best Townes album that he was ever involved in but Van Zandt's guitarist Mickey White offers a different perspective, telling Kruth, "The album sounds a bit tentative in spots 'cause we didn't use headphones and missed some of the nuances goin' on. And by the time of At My Window, Townes's skills were not consistent...he didn't fingerpick as well as he used to. And he started getting a little lazy as a singer. As his voice matured, it got deeper and more resonant, but he tended to not sing with as much energy and lung power as he used to and started shaving off his notes and phrases more and more." White also adds that At My Window was mostly produced by Jim Rooney because "Jack was out of state, down in Florida."

== Composition ==
Several of the songs that appear on At My Window had been written years before. "Buckskin Stallion" and the title track were originally recorded in 1973 during the sessions for an unreleased album called 7 Come 11 that would eventually surface in 1993 as The Nashville Sessions. In live performances of "Buckskin Stallion," Van Zandt would joke that the song was half about a woman and half about a horse, adding that he missed the horse. At My Window also marked the fourth time "For the Sake of the Song" appeared on a Van Zandt recording, having appeared on the singer's debut album in 1968, Townes Van Zandt in 1969 and Live at the Old Quarter, Houston, Texas in 1977. According to the 2007 biography To Live's To Fly: The Ballad of the Late, Great Townes Van Zandt, the song "The Catfish Song" was written while Van Zandt sat by the Harpeth River, where the Battle of Franklin took place, when the singer lived in a cabin in Franklin, Tennessee in the late 1970s. The book also reveals that Van Zandt wrote the good-time country-blues romp "Ain't Leavin' Your Love" the day after his wife Jeanene brought their newborn baby home in March 1983. Van Zandt co-wrote "Gone, Gone Blues" with Mickey White.

== Release and reception ==
Professional ratings
Review scores
| Source | Rating |
|---|---|
| AllMusic | 3/5 stars |
| Rolling Stone | 5/5 stars |
| The Washington Post | (favorable) |

At My Window was released in 1987 to positive reviews. Writing in The New York Times, Robert Palmer declared, "Nobody writes songs about love affairs gone wrong with as much tenderness and insight," adding that Van Zandt sings with "an almost yodel that's country music's equivalent of the bluesy quaver black singer's call soul." Palmer also drew comparisons between Van Zandt and Hank Williams, observing that "their songwriting craft and vocal musicianship are exceptional, but what you hear beyond that: it seems to be the direct, untrammeled expression of a man's soul..." Comparisons of the lives of these two men continued to increase following Van Zandt's death on New Year's Day 1997, the forty-fourth anniversary of Williams' death.

AllMusic's Kelly McCarthey writes "Whether in sweetly tender ballads or honky cowboy ditties, Van Zandt truly wrote of heartache and heartbreak with the best of them...For Van Zandt was of a different breed. In "Buckskin Stallion Blues" he sings 'If three and four were seven only, where would that leave one and two?' That's a contemplation for the ages." Amazon.com opines, "The funky "Ain't Leavin' Your Love" comes complete with an unlikely saxophone solo, while "Catfish Song" boasts the kind of gospel melody that marked this gentle, hard-living man as one of the finest songwriters to have ever worked in a country-folk vein." Biographer John Kruth stated in 2007, "Finally, Van Zandt's poetry took a front seat and was able to shine through unfettered. His weathered voice, full of resignation and melancholy, was now that of a grateful survivor."

Several songs on At My Window have been recorded by other artists. "Buckskin Stallion Blues" was recorded and adopted as the title track of a 1994 collaborative EP by country singer Jimmie Dale Gilmore and the grunge band Mudhoney. Other notable At My Window covers include Robert Earl Keen's take on "Snowin' on Raton" for his Gravitational Forces album and Pat Green & Cory Morrow's cover of "Ain't Leavin' Your Love" on Songs We Wish We'd Written. Pat Green and Natalie Maines recorded a duet of "Snowin' On Raton" for Green's 1997 album George's Bar. Richard Dobson recorded four songs from the album for his 1994 tribute album Amigos: Richard Dobson Sings Townes Van Zandt. "At My Window" was covered by Mare Edstrom on the 2004 album Learning How To Believe. The Flatlanders recorded "Blew Wind Blew" for the 2001 album Poet: A Tribute to Townes Van Zandt. The song also appears on Emmylou Harris's 2001 album Songbird: Rare Tracks and Forgotten Gems. "For the Sake of the Song" has been recorded by Azure Ray on their EP November and William Boyd Chisum on his 2006 album Chasing The Wind.

== Artwork ==
The album cover for At My Window features a domesticated looking Van Zandt posing in Jack Clement's kitchen, hearkening back to the cover of his self-titled album in 1969. In 2007, biographer John Kruth said of the photograph, "Townes's eyes are soft, friendly, resigned. His gold-coin belt buckle and cowboy shirt, embroidered with a winning poker hand, let you know that although he's now a family man, he's still up for a friendly wager. Warm and cozy as the scene is, there is something obviously askew." The album was released with a sticker containing an infamous quote from Steve Earle: "Townes Van Zandt is the best songwriter in the whole world and I'll stand on Bob Dylan's coffee table in my cowboy boots and say that." Van Zandt responded with the famous quip, "I've met Bob Dylan's bodyguards, and I don't think Steve could get anywhere near his coffee table."

== Track listing ==
All songs written by Townes Van Zandt, except where noted

1. "Snowin' on Raton" – 3:52
2. "Blue Wind Blew" – 2:39
3. "At My Window" – 4:09
4. "For the Sake of the Song" – 4:24
5. "Ain't Leavin' Your Love" – 2:33
6. "Buckskin Stallion Blues" – 3:01
7. "Little Sundance #2" – 2:57
8. "Still Lookin' for You" – 2:37
9. "Gone, Gone Blues" – (Van Zandt, Mickey White) 2:43
10. "The Catfish Song" – 4:24

== Personnel ==
=== Musicians ===
- Townes Van Zandt – vocals, acoustic guitar
- Mickey White – acoustic rhythm, lead and slide guitar
- Donny Silverman – saxophone, flute
- Jack Clement – acoustic guitar, Dobro
- Jim Rooney – acoustic guitar
- Mark Howard – acoustic steel and gut string guitar
- Charles Cochran – piano, DX-7
- Mark O'Connor – fiddle, mandolin
- Mickey Raphael – harmonica
- Joey Miskulin – accordion
- Roy Huskey, Jr. – acoustic bass
- Kenny Malone – drums, percussion

=== Production ===
- Produced by Jack Clement & Jim Rooney
- Recorded & Mixed at Jack Clement's Cowboy Arms Hotel & Recording Spa, Nashville, Tennessee
- Engineered by Jim Rooney, assisted by David Ferguson & Rich Adler
- Mastered as Masterfonics, Nashville, TN

=== Artwork ===
- Photography – McGuire
- Cover design – Raymond Simone

=== Other ===
- Special thanks to Jeanene Van Zandt, Guy & Susannah Clark, Jerry Jackson & Kathy Merola
- Bookings – The Case Company, 1016 16th Avenue South, Nashville, TN

== Releases ==
The original CD release (and possibly other formats as well) was digitally mixed and mastered. Some copies included a bright pink sticker on the shrink wrap with the now famous quote from Steve Earle, "Townes Van Zandt is the best songwriter in the whole world, and I'll stand on Bob Dylan's coffee table in my cowboy boots and say that."

| year | format | label | catalog # |
|---|---|---|---|
| 1987 | LP | Sugar Hill | SH-1020 |
| 1990 | LP | Sugar Hill | 1020 |
| 1992 | cassette | Sugar Hill | SH-C-1020 |
| 1992 | CD | Sugar Hill | SH-CD-1020 |
