= High, Low and In Between =

Album by Townes Van Zandt

Studio album by Townes Van Zandt
- Released: December 1971
- Recorded: April 1971
- Studios: Larrabee Sound Studios, Los Angeles, California
- Genres: Country, folk, gospel
- Length: 31:44
- Label: Poppy
- Producer: Kevin Eggers

Townes Van Zandt chronology
Delta Momma Blues (1971)	High, Low and In Between (1971)	The Late Great Townes Van Zandt (1972)

Professional ratings
Review scores
Source	Rating
AllMusic	4/5 stars
Pitchfork Media	8.8/10

High, Low and In Between is the fifth studio album by country singer/songwriter Townes Van Zandt, released in 1971. The album was recorded in L.A. and showcases what Van Zandt himself considered to be one of his most well-written songs: "To Live Is To Fly".

== Recording ==
High, Low and In Between was cut at Larrabee Sound Studios in Los Angeles with Kevin Eggers returning in the role of producer. The session players included guitarist Larry Carlton, guitarist David Cohen, and bassist Harvey Newmark, while organist Don Randi arranged the music for Van Zandt's eleven new creations. Unlike Van Zandt's previous album Delta Momma Blues, which features very sparse arrangements, High Low and in Between incorporates a folk-rock edge.

== Composition ==
Many of the themes on High, Low and In Between deal with moral dilemmas, with songs that celebrate both the pleasure of sin and the joy of salvation. In the comical "No Deal" the drunken narrator falls in love with a girl who has "barely turned fifteen" and declares if Heaven has no whiskey and women, "I'm gonna take my chances down below and of that you can be sure", while "Highway Kind" is a dark minor key ballad that explores the resigned loneliness of a drifting troubadour, something Van Zandt knew about all too well. These tunes contrast markedly with "Two Hands" and "When He Offers His Hand", a couple of Gospel-infused numbers that celebrate Jesus and the guiding light of God. However, Van Zandt appears to contradict these sentiments again in "You Are Not Needed Now" when he sings, "Heaven ain't bad but you don't get nothin' done." The life-affirming "To Live Is To Fly" is one of Van Zandt's most celebrated works, one that the songwriter himself singled out for praise; in the book To Live's To Fly: The Ballad of the Late, Great Townes Van Zandt, biographer John Kruth quotes the singer who confessed, "It's impossible to have a favorite song, but if I were forced at knifepoint to choose one, it would be 'To Live Is To Fly.'" Some have speculated that several of the songs on High, Low and In Between were informed by the murder of Van Zandt's girlfriend Leslie Jo Richards, who was stabbed after being picked up hitchhiking back to Houston from Van Zandt's recording sessions. Although the relationship had nearly run its course, Van Zandt's guitarist Mickey White told biographer John Kruth that the sudden shock of her death left the singer "devastated. It was a life-changing experience for him." Van Zandt was also in the grips of a heroin habit, an addiction that would continue to plague him throughout his life. In his 2018 memoir My Years with Townes Van Zandt: Music, Genius, and Rage, road manager Harold Eggers states of Richards death, "I always felt this was a key turn in Townes's life, leading to a profound embitterment and a deepening of his already pessimistic outlook. A couple weeks later, while in Houston, Townes overdosed on heroin. He was rushed to Ben Taub Hospital, revived, and narrowly saved from death."

One of the more complex songs that Van Zandt ever wrote was "Mr. Mudd and Mr. Gold", an allegory involving a game of five-card stud. On the Be Here To Love Me DVD, Steve Earle reveals that the song figured prominently in his first meeting with his idol. Earle recalls playing to an empty No Quarter club in Houston when Van Zandt showed up drunk, sat in the front row and, in between songs, began heckling the young singer and demanding that he play "Wabash Cannonball". A flustered Earle finally admitted that he didn't know the song, to which Van Zandt replied aghast, "You call yourself a folk singer and you don't know the 'Wabash Cannonball?'" Earle responded by playing "Mr. Mudd and Mr. Gold", effectively stunning Van Zandt into silence. Earle remembers that he wore out his copy of High, Low and In Between learning the song, which has "a jillion words", and claims that even Van Zandt didn't know it anymore in the last ten years of his life. When the New York based Tomato imprint reissued six of Van Zandt's Poppy label albums during the late Seventies, the singer offered the following insight into the creation of the song to Lola Sweeny, who penned the liner notes: "I wrote 'Mr. Mudd and Mr. Gold' in a sort of frenzy. It just came pouring out of me. I couldn't stop, and I wrote so fast my hands were aching. Even I don't know what that song means." AllMusic states, "Van Zandt crams an amazing amount of brilliant imagery into the song's brief two-minute duration, a performance that's both impressive and impenetrable."

Jim Beviglia writing at AmericanSongwriter.com calls "Mr. Mudd and Mr. Gold" "a stunning display of lyrical cleverness, as Townes imagines a card game where the cards themselves have a stake in who wins".

== Release and reception ==
Although High, Low and In Between features some of Van Zandt's most popular songwriting efforts, it was not a commercial success. John M. Lomax reviewed the album for the Houston newspaper Space City in November 1971, stating the album is "an excursion into the prettiest flowing blues I have ever heard," adding "Dylan wrote this way once. Hank Williams wrote like this. Nobody does anymore." In a retrospective review, AllMusic praises the album and its production, stating that "Tomato Records's owner Kevin Eggers, who was responsible for many of Van Zandt's best records, produced this album with minimal backing that keeps the spotlight on Van Zandt's vocals and his songwriting." Van Zandt biographer John Kruth disagrees, writing in To Live's To Fly that, "It is ultimately a difficult and unsatisfying album. The record plods along, hampered by hackneyed arrangements and production values." Kruth is especially critical of the "saccharine backup vocals" on "Two Hands" and the arrangement of "When He Offers His Hand", which "sounds as if it would be right at home on a K-Mart Christmas compilation". The liner notes to the Charly Record reissue of the album claim that the title track, with its line "Us ramblers will get the travellin' done" may "simply appear to be a gentle reflective ballad – but without doubt, it is one of the finest autobiographical songs he ever wrote".

Several of the compositions on High, Low and In Between have been recorded by other artists. Van Zandt's friend and fellow songwriter Guy Clark recorded "To Live Is To Fly" several times, including as a duet with Emmylou Harris that was featured on his 1988 album Old Friends. Clark also covered "No Deal" on his 1983 album Better Days and again on his 1995 LP Craftsman. The Cowboy Junkies recorded a rendition of "Highway Kind" for the 2001 tribute album Poet: A Tribute to Townes Van Zandt. Steve Earle included "Mr. Mudd and Mr. Gold" on his tribute album Townes in 2009. Vince Bell has also recorded the song. Mike Scheidt, the lead vocalist and guitarist of American doom metal band YOB also covered "To Live is To Fly", released in 2014.

An article from 1996 credited only to Knight-Ridder Newspapers about the re-issue from EMI Records of High, Low and In Between and The Late, Great Townes Van Zandt on a single CD calls Van Zandt "the antithesis of slick" and says that these two albums highlight his "relaxed approach to his profession and the occasional off-kilter insights gleaned from a life lived doggedly outside the mainstream".

John Lomax III, writing in Houston's underground newspaper, Space City! in 1971, said "This [album] is a fine sampler of Townes with a talking blues, a traditional, several up-tempo songs and his patented bittersweet ballads."

== Artwork ==
The cover of High, Low and In Between features Van Zandt in a white shirt standing in front of a dimly lit recording studio with his hands behind his back. The photograph is uncredited.

== Track listing ==
1. "Two Hands"
2. "You Are Not Needed Now"
3. "Greensboro Woman"
4. "Highway Kind"
5. "Standin'"
6. "No Deal"
7. "To Live Is to Fly"
8. "When He Offers His Hand"
9. "Mr. Mudd & Mr. Gold"
10. "Blue Ridge Mountains"
11. "High, Low and In Between"

== Personnel ==
- Townes Van Zandt – vocals, guitar
- Larry Carlton – pedal steel guitar on "You Are Not Needed Now"
- Donnie Owens – guitar
- David Cohen – guitar
- Don Randi – piano, organ, cymbals, handclaps, arrangement
- Harvey Newmark – bass
- John Summer – drums
- Ann Whitsett – handclaps
