= The Late Great Townes Van Zandt =

Studio album by Townes Van Zandt
- Released: September 1972
- Recorded: 1972
- Studio: Jack Clement, Nashville, Tennessee
- Genre: Progressive country
- Length: 38:31
- Label: Poppy
- Producer: Jack Clement

Townes Van Zandt chronology
High, Low and In Between (1972)	The Late Great Townes Van Zandt (1972)	Live at the Old Quarter, Houston, Texas (1977)

The Late Great Townes Van Zandt is the sixth studio album by American singer-songwriter Townes Van Zandt. It was the second album that he recorded in 1972, and a follow-up to High, Low and In Between.

== Recording ==
The Late, Great Townes Van Zandt would be the singer's last studio album for the ailing Poppy Records. It was produced by Jack Clement, with executive producer Kevin Eggers telling Van Zandt biographer John Kruth in 2007, "Jack produced the basic tracks to 'No Lonesome Tune' and 'Honky Tonkin'. I cut all the basic tracks to everything else and mixed it. The strings on the 'Silver Ships of Andilar' were arranged by Bergen White, one of the few black musicians in Nashville who happened to be the top string arranger in those days." According to the book To Live's To Fly: The Ballad of the Late, Great Townes Van Zandt, Eggers had wanted to overdub drums on "Pancho and Lefty" but Van Zandt vetoed the idea.

== Composition ==
The album includes what is Van Zandt's signature tune, the enigmatic "Pancho and Lefty", which Willie Nelson and Merle Haggard took to number one on the country charts in 1983.

Although "Pancho and Lefty" is the song most associated with Van Zandt, "If I Needed You" is his most covered composition. A lilting portrait of undying love, the song was first recorded by Doc Watson on his 1973 Grammy-winning album Then and Now and later taken to number three on the country charts by Emmylou Harris and Don Williams in 1981. The characters Loop and Lil mentioned in the song were actually a pair of parakeets that Van Zandt carried with him. In an interview on the show Nashville Now, Van Zandt insisted to Ralph Emery that he wrote the song in his sleep, dreaming the melody and writing down the words when he woke up. In the Be Here To Love Me documentary, Van Zandt's first wife Fran Petters states when he first played it for her she thought it was "the most beautiful song I'd ever heard" but it wasn't until years later that she was certain he had written it for her when Van Zandt called her in the middle of the night in 1981, long after they had parted ways, and exclaimed, "Babe, we finally made it!", a reference to the Harris/Williams duet that was riding high on the charts.

The Late, Great Townes Van Zandt includes the singer's take on two country classics: "Honky Tonkin'", originally written by Van Zandt's hero Hank Williams, and "Fraulein", which had been his father's favorite country song. Van Zandt also recorded the Guy Clark-penned "Don't Let The Sunshine Fool Ya" and co-wrote the lullaby "Heavenly Houseboat Blues" with Clark's wife Susanna. The lascivious "German Mustard (A Clapalong)" was a collaboration with guitarist Rocky Hill (formerly of the 1960s Dallas band American Blues and brother of ZZ Top bassist Dusty Hill) and features a prominent slide guitar and what sounds like improvised Van Zandt lyrics. "Sad Cinderella" first appeared on Van Zandt's debut For the Sake of the Song but, like several other cuts on the album, was later rerecorded by the singer, who remained unhappy with the overproduction on his first LP. The album's closing track "Silver Ships of Andilar" is a Van Zandt epic which contains seven verses about a dying man who, out of desperation, slips a message into a bottle. Guitarist Mickey White told Van Zandt biographer John Kruth in 2007 that the mournful ballad "Snow Don't Fall" was written about Van Zandt's former girlfriend Leslie Jo Richards, who had been murdered the year before. In his 2018 memoir My Years with Townes Van Zandt: Music, Genius, and Rage, road manager Harold Eggers writes, "It was a song he would never perform live, no matter how insistent the request."

== Album title & artwork ==
In the 2007 biography To Live's To Fly: The Ballad of the Late, Great Townes Van Zandt, the theory is put forth that the album's title was inspired by a night in 1972 when the singer "died twice in one night" on the way to the hospital after a heroin overdose, an event his former wife Fran describes in harrowing detail. However, manager and producer Kevin Eggers told Van Zandt biographer John Kruth that he conceived the album's title in the hopes that he could draw attention to Van Zandt's career with a Beatles-inspired "Paul is Dead" type hoax and goes on to lament that his client's fan base was "zip, zero, nada. Townes had no commercial success. He was a blip on the radar screen. He worked very hard at being professional and had enormous exposure, but it was like we gave a party and nobody came. I never made any money on him. Nothing happened with 'Pancho and Lefty' for ten years." Eggers also reveals to Kruth that an exasperated Jack Clement nearly had a fistfight with Charley Pride trying to get him to record "If I Needed You", something the country star refused to do. Milton Glaser, who had devised surreal covers for 2nd Right, 3rd Row for painter and folksinger Eric Von Schmidt and I'm A Stranger, Too for Chris Smither, designed Van Zandt's album cover to resemble an old-world funerary card with Gothic lettering across the top of the sleeve. The photograph itself was snapped by Steve Salmierie and features Van Zandt solemnly posing alone with his guitar in Kevin Eggers's Brooklyn Heights townhouse. The back cover features another photograph taken by Salmierie of the happily wasted singer giving the photographer the finger.

== Release & reception ==
Professional ratings
Review scores
Source	Rating
AllMusic	4/5 stars
Pitchfork Media	8.4/10

The Late Great Townes Van Zandt was released in 1972 and has since made several critical "best of all-time" lists. Stereophile included it as one of 94 honorable mentions that just missed their list of "The 40 Essential Albums". AllMusic states, "This is the second perfect album Van Zandt cut in 1972, a complement to High, Low and In Between. Together they contain the highest points of his brilliant but erratic career. The Late Great may be a bit stronger, with classics like 'Pancho & Lefty', 'No Lonesome Tune', and 'If I Needed You', but there's not a weak track here." Amazon.com calls it "Van Zandt's perfect storm" and declares, "The Late Great, Townes Van Zandt might be his masterwork...a release that should be in every collection of great American music." John Kruth writes in To Live's To Fly that former Warner Brothers publicist Bill Bently gave Elvis Costello a cassette of Van Zandt songs to play as the musician learned how to drive and Costello "was so moved by 'Sad Cinderella' that he was said to have curbed the car and could only listen in awe" while Jack Clement marveled to Kruth that "Silver Ships of Andilar was "more like a movie than a song."

Several of the songs on The Late, Great Townes Van Zandt have been recorded by other artists, most notably "If I Needed You" and "Pancho and Lefty". "If I Needed You" has been recorded by Andrew Bird, Tom Astor, Ray Benson, Bonnie Bishop, Ginger Boatwright, Phil Cody, Dashboard Confessional, the Dead Ringer Band, Richard Dobson, Fireside, Enzo Garcia and Rhonda Harris. Emmylou Harris recorded the song as a duet with Don Williams and later with Van Zandt himself. "Pancho and Lefty" has been recorded by Willie Nelson and Merle Haggard, Emmylou Harris, Sally Barker, Johnny Bush, Pete Charles, the Cumberland Trio, Richard Dobson, Steve Earle, Cleve Francis, Dick Gaughan, Hawke, and Hoyt Axton. The Axton recording meant a lot to Van Zandt, who later recalled in an interview in Omaha Rainbow, "I learnt to finger pick from one of Hoyt Axton's records...He's always been a favorite of mine. I played with him a couple of years ago. It really blew my mind when he recorded 'Pancho and Lefty.'" "No Lonesome Tune" has been recorded by David Bavas, Saul Broudy, Guy Clark, Mark Dvorak and Jimmie Dale Gilmore. A duet of the song featuring Van Zandt and Willie Nelson can also be found on the 2001 release Texas Rain: The Texas Hill Country Recordings.

== Track listing ==
All lyrics and music by Townes Van Zandt unless noted otherwise:

1. "No Lonesome Tune" – 4:21
2. "Sad Cinderella" – 4:15
3. "German Mustard (A Clapalong)" (Van Zandt, Rocky Hill) – 2:55
4. "Don't Let the Sunshine Fool Ya'" (Guy Clark) – 2:25
5. "Honky Tonkin'" (Hank Williams) – 3:44
6. "Snow Don't Fall" – 2:27
7. "Fraulein" (Lawton Williams) – 2:42
8. "Pancho and Lefty" – 3:40
9. "If I Needed You" – 3:44
10. "Silver Ships of Andilar" – 5:07
11. "Heavenly Houseboat Blues" (Van Zandt, Susanna Clark) – 2:51

Arranged by Chuck Cochran

== Release history ==
year	format	label	catalog #
1972	LP	Poppy	PP-LA004-F
1973	LP	United Artists	UAS 29442
1988	CD	Decal	CD CHARLY 145
1988	LP	Decal	LIK 49
1989	CD	Tomato	2696272
1989	LP	Tomato	2696271
1994	CD	Rhino	R2 71242
1996	CD	Capitol	53930B
1997	CD	Charly	CDGR 215
2003	CD	Tomato	TOM-2010
2003	CD	Charly	SNAP 138 CD
2013	LP	Omnivore Recordings	OVLP-22
2013	CD	Omnivore Recordings	OVCD-22
2015	LP	Charly	CHARLY L 175
2015	CD	Charly	CHARLY F 835

== Credits ==
=== Musicians ===
- Townes Van Zandt – acoustic guitar & vocals
- Joe Allan – bass
- Jack Clement – mandolin
- Vassar Clements – fiddle
- Chuck Cochran – piano, keyboards & arrangements
- Jim Colvard – acoustic guitar, electric guitar
- Rocky Hill – slide guitar
- Kenny Malone – drums

=== Production ===
- Produced by Jack Clement
- Executive producer – Kevin Eggers
- Engineer – Garth Fundis
- Production coordination – Kevin Calabro, Katja Maas, & Tyson Schuetze
- Remastering – Gene Paul

=== Artwork ===
- Milton Glaser – art direction, design, & cover design
- Steve Salmieri – photography
- Kevin Eggers & Lola Scobey – liner notes
