= Pancho and Lefty =

1972 country song

Song by Townes Van Zandt

from the album The Late Great Townes Van Zandt
- Released: 1972
- Genre: Country, folk
- Length: 3:40
- Label: Tomato
- Songwriter: Townes Van Zandt
- Producers: Kevin Eggers; Jack Clement

"Pancho and Lefty", originally "Poncho and Lefty", (Note: When originally released in 1972 as a single by Townes Van Zandt and on his The Late Great Townes Van Zandt album that same year, the song title was spelled "Poncho and Lefty". Emmylou Harris's 1977 album Luxury Liner included a version of the song also spelled "Poncho". Initial releases of Merle Haggard and Willie Nelson's 1983 album were also called "Poncho & Lefty", but the title spelling was mixed (some labels read "Pancho", while liner notes read "Poncho") and changed in the years following the release of the title track as the albums's second single with the spelling "Pancho and Lefty". The "Pancho" spelling has persisted and even some later releases of Van Zandt and Harris's albums on CD have been altered to match the Haggard and Nelson hit.) is a song written by American country singer-songwriter Townes Van Zandt. Perhaps his most well-known song, Van Zandt recorded his original version of this song for his 1972 album The Late Great Townes Van Zandt. The song has been recorded by several artists since its composition and performance by Van Zandt, with a 1983 version by Willie Nelson and Merle Haggard reaching number one on the Billboard country chart.

In 2021, Van Zandt's version was ranked number 498 on Rolling Stone's 500 Greatest Songs of All Time. In 2024 it was ranked number 499.

== Music and lyrics ==
The song is composed as a ballad of four stanzas which use the refrain: "All the Federales say they could've had him any day/ They only let him slip away out of kindness I suppose." The first two stanzas are sung back-to-back with the refrain being sung only after the second stanza. The verses of the first stanza introduce Pancho as a restless young soul who leaves home and his loving mother to seek his fortune south of the border. The verses of the second stanza describe him as a Mexican bandit, who "wore his gun outside his pants for all the honest world to feel". The third stanza tells of Pancho's eventual death in "the deserts down in Mexico" and implies that he was betrayed to the federales by Lefty in exchange for being allowed to return to the United States. Lefty spends the last years of his life in a hotel in Cleveland, apparently regretful of his actions. The fourth stanza poetizes Pancho's life and appears to evoke sympathy for Lefty's attempted homecoming.

While Van Zandt did not intend for Pancho to be Pancho Villa, he did not rule out the idea. In an interview, he recalled, "I realize that I wrote it, but it's hard to take credit for the writing, because it came from out of the blue. It came through me and it's a real nice song, and I think, I've finally found out what it's about. I've always wondered what it's about. I kinda always knew it wasn't about Pancho Villa, and then somebody told me that Pancho Villa had a buddy whose name in Spanish meant 'Lefty.' But in the song, my song, Pancho gets hung...and the real Pancho Villa was assassinated."

== Background and reception ==
Like much of Van Zandt's output, the song went largely unnoticed at the time of its release on the album The Late Great Townes Van Zandt in 1972. Neither it nor its parent album made any music charts. In 1973, Lonnie Knight played with Van Zandt for a week at the Rubaiyat in Dallas, Texas. He brought this song back to Minneapolis with him and recorded it on his first album, Family In The Wind, in 1974.

In 1977, Emmylou Harris covered the song on her album Luxury Liner. Harris says she feels it is "her song", and it was this recording of the song that Willie Nelson first heard.

Willie Nelson and Merle Haggard recorded a version for their July 1983 duet album Pancho & Lefty. In the documentary Be Here to Love Me, Nelson states that when he asked Van Zandt what the song was about Van Zandt replied that he didn't know. Nelson also recalls how his album with Haggard was nearly completed but he felt they didn't have "that blockbuster, you know, that one big song for a good single and a video, and my daughter Lana suggested that we listen to 'Pancho and Lefty.' I had never heard it and Merle had never heard it." Lana Nelson returned with a copy of the song and Nelson cut it immediately with his band in the middle of the night but had to retrieve a sleeping Haggard, who had retired to his bus hours earlier, to record his vocal part.

The vocals were recorded in one take that night. The next day, Haggard wanted to rerecord his part, but Nelson told him the song had already been sent to New York. Haggard later stated that the song was the only one he had ever recorded before "he really knew it".

Van Zandt appears in the video for the song, playing one of the federales. "It was real nice they invited me," Van Zandt told Aretha Sills in 1994. "They didn't have to invite me and I made I think $100 a day. I was the captain of the federales. And plus I got to ride a horse. I always like that. It took four and a half days and that video was four and a half minutes long...The money goes by a strange life, or elsewhere."

When released as a single, this version of the song topped the Billboard country chart. The royalties would provide Van Zandt with some badly needed income, though by all accounts he remained impervious to the song's success. One story involving the song that Van Zandt loved to tell was when he got pulled over for speeding in Berkshire, Texas, by two policemen, the first a blue-eyed white man with a crew cut, and his partner a bronze, dark eyed Mexican. Although his driver's license was up-to-date, the inspection sticker had expired, and the bedraggled singer found himself in the back of the police cruiser. As Van Zandt recounted on Austin Pickers, "We got stopped by these two policemen and... they said 'What do you do for a living?', and I said, 'Well, I'm a songwriter,' and they both kind of looked around like "pitiful, pitiful," and so on to that I added, 'I wrote that song Pancho and Lefty. You ever heard that song Pancho and Lefty? I wrote that', and they looked back around and they looked at each other and started grinning..." The policemen explained that their police-radio code names were Pancho and Lefty and they let Van Zandt off with a warning.

The song is probably Van Zandt's most recognizable and is often covered. Steve Earle told John Kruth in 2004, "You won't find a song that's better written, that says more or impresses songwriters more." In the film Be Here To Love Me, Kris Kristofferson recites the opening lines of the song and then marvels, "And I could think, 'That was me!'"

Bob Dylan, whose album The Times They Are A-Changin' had a major impact on Van Zandt, performed the song as a duet on television with Willie Nelson at Nelson's 60th birthday concert in 1993, which Andy Greene of Rolling Stone remembers as "the highlight of the night".

== Video release ==
A music video was released for the song in 1983, depicting Willie Nelson as Pancho, and Merle Haggard as Lefty. Townes Van Zandt also appears in a supporting role. Nelson's daughter Lana directed the video, the first for Nelson and second for Haggard, the first being for "Are the Good Times Really Over?" a year prior.

== Reception ==
The song reached No. 1 on Billboard's Hot Country Songs chart dated July 23, 1983. The Willie Nelson release has sold 648,000 digital copies in the United States as of October 2019 since becoming available for download.

"Pancho and Lefty"

Single by Merle Haggard and Willie Nelson

from the album Pancho & Lefty
- B-side: "Opportunity to Cry"
- Released: April 30, 1983
- Genre: Country; outlaw country
- Length: 4:44
- Label: Epic
- Songwriter: Townes Van Zandt
- Producers: Chips Moman; Willie Nelson; Merle Haggard

Merle Haggard singles chronology
"You Take Me for Granted" (1983)	"Pancho and Lefty" (1983)	"What Am I Gonna Do (With the Rest of My Life)" (1983)

Willie Nelson singles chronology
"Little Old Fashioned Karma" (1983)	"Pancho and Lefty" (1983)	"Why Do I Have to Choose" (1983)

=== Legacy ===
"Pancho and Lefty" was covered by Merle Haggard and Willie Nelson; it was the title track of their duet album Pancho & Lefty, and a number one country hit that entered the Grammy Hall of Fame in 2020.

Members of the Western Writers of America chose it as the 17th-greatest Western song of all time.

In June 2004, Rolling Stone ranked "Pancho and Lefty" 41st on its list of the "100 Greatest Country Songs of All Time".

In 2021, the original version was listed at #498 on Rolling Stone's 500 Greatest Songs of All Time.

=== Willie Nelson and Merle Haggard ===
==== Weekly charts ====
Chart (1983)	Peak position
US Adult Contemporary (Billboard)	21
US Hot Country Songs (Billboard)	1
Canadian RPM Country Tracks	1

==== Year-end charts ====
Chart (1983)	Position
US Hot Country Songs (Billboard)	6
