= Tomato Records =

- Founded: May 1977
- Founder: Kevin Eggers
- Distributor: Self-distributed
- Genre: Various
- Country of origin: United States

The Tomato Music Co. Ltd., also known as Tomato Records, is an American independent record label founded in New York City in 1977 by music manager Kevin Eggers. It was a successor to his previous record labels Utopia and Poppy, the label was self-distributed, and has released albums by influential artists such as Townes Van Zandt, Lightnin' Hopkins, Lead Belly, Chris Smither, Dave Brubeck, Nina Simone, Annette Peacock, Harry Partch, John Cage, Philip Glass, Merle Haggard and Albert King. Rhino Records handled the distribution of Tomato Records' catalogue in the 1990s, before the label closed. It was revived in 2002.

== Sources ==
- "Indie Switch for Tomato". Billboard Magazine. New York. 21 May 1977.
- Komara, Edward M. (2006). Encyclopedia of the Blues: K-Z, Index. New York: Routledge. p. 994. ISBN 9780415927017.
- Newton, Jon (29 January 2001). "Tomato Records, back again". MusicDish. MusicDish LLC. Archived from the original on July 4, 2002.
