= Houston Press (Scripps Howard) =

Daily newspaper in Texas, 1911–1964

- Founder: Paul Carroll Edwards (1882–1962)
- Publisher: Scripps-Howard
- Staff writers: 320 (1963)
- Launched: Vol. 1, no. 1; September 25, 1911
- Ceased publication: Vol. 53, no. 153; March 20, 1964 (52-year run)
- Headquarters: 1928–1964: 2001–2015 Rusk Street (at Chartres Street) Houston, Texas
- Circulation: 90,400 (1963)
- OCLC number: 14353651

The Houston Press was a Scripps Howard daily afternoon newspaper, founded in 1911, in Houston, Texas. Under the leadership of founding editor Paul C. Edwards (1911–16), Marcellus E. Foster, known as "Mefo" (1927–37), and George Carmack (1946–64), the newspaper developed a reputation for flashy stories about violence and sex and for exposés of political malfeasance. It ceased publication in 1964.

== History ==
The Houston Press was first issued September 25, 1911, from a plant at 709 Louisiana Street, for 1 cent a copy. For the first 58 days, the Press had no advertising; its management asserted that its circulation had yet to warrant investment of any advertiser's money.

Notable former staff members included Walter Cronkite, who later became the CBS news anchor; Thomas Thompson, author of Hearts and Blood and Money; Donald Forst, later editor of Newsday and The Village Voice; Pulitzer Prize-winning reporter and biographer Vance Trimble; columnists Sig Byrd ("The Stroller") and Carl Victor Little (1894–1959) ("By The Way"); gossip columnist Maxine Mesinger; and television crusader Marvin Zindler, who once worked there as a photographer covering crime stories. Joseph Agris, who became Zindler's biographer, called the Houston Press "a paper that, by journalistic standards, had no standards at all" and Clyde Waddell who was a chief photographer in 1943.

=== Closure of the Press in 1964 ===
In 1963, the year before it closed, the Press had an average daily circulation (Monday–Saturday) of 90,400, and employed 320 people. On March 20, 1964, editor Carmack and business manager Ray L. Powers announced that the newspaper, plant, and facilities had been sold to the larger of its two rivals, the Houston Chronicle, for $4.5 million (equivalent to $46.71 million in 2025). The Press had never missed a publication since it was founded. Following the closure of the Press, two Houston daily newspapers remained, the morning Houston Post and the evening Houston Chronicle (1964 average daily circulation of 226,600). Houston, before the closing of the Press, had been the only city west of the Mississippi River with more than two daily newspapers.

== Houston Press selected personnel ==
=== Editors ===
In its 52-year history The Press had six editors:

- 1911–1916: Paul Carroll Edwards (1882–1962), in 1975, was posthumously inducted into the California Press Hall of Fame. He had been associated with Scripps for 50 years. He was a 1906 graduate of Stanford and, in 1943, was appointed to Stanford's Board of Trustees, serving as President of the Board from 1948 to 1953. Edwards was editor of the San Francisco News from 1932 until his death.
- 1916–1922: G.V. Sanders (né Gold Viron Gribble Sanders; aka Gold Vernon Sanders; 1891–1975) never used his first name, "Gold," until later in life.
- 1922–1927: Charles Joseph Lilley (1893–1946) died November 18, 1946, while serving as Editor and general manager of the Sacramento Union, a role he had held since 1930.
- 1927–1937: Marcellus "Mefo" Elliott Foster (1870–1942)
- 1937–1945: Allan Charles Bartlett (1897–1970)
- 1946–1964: George Burnett Carmack (1907–1995)

=== Managing editors ===
- 1925–1929: Webb Chamberlain Artz (1889–1941), in 1924, after 4 years with the San Antonio Evening News as City Editor, left to join the Press in the same role. He went on to become Managing Editor of the Press.
- 1929–1931: Dudley Davis (né William Dudley Davis; 1901–1931) died July 10, 1931, of injuries after his automobile struck a bus.
- 1931–1937: Edward Murray Pooley (1898–1969), who had been City Editor of the Press, succeeded Davis as Managing editor. He was a 1919 graduate of Sewanee.
- 1950–1955: Vance Trimble (1913–2021)

=== Journalists ===
- 1947–1951: Sig Byrd (né Luther Sigman Byrd; 1909–1987), born in Blanket, Texas, wrote a popular daily column for the Press, "The Stroller", which led to a book, Sig Byrd's Houston (1955; Viking Press). His beat covered venues and neighborhoods that included Congress Avenue, the Segundo Barrio, Catfish Reef (the 400 block of lower Milam Street), the Bayou of the Buffalo Fish, Pearl Harbor (the corner of Hill and Lyons), The Big Casino (not Houston's oldest saloon at 908 Congress Avenue ... "But ... the new Big Casino, on Preston Avenue." ), and Vinegar Hill (red-light district, between Prairie and Congress Avenue). In 1951, he left the Press for the Houston Chronicle. In Laura Flanders review of Bill Minutaglio and W. Michael Smith's book, Molly Ivins: A Rebel Life (2009), she cited the authors' admiration of Byrd, "Over at the Houston Press, gumshoe reporter Sigman Byrd was 'out-Breslin[ing] Jimmy Breslin [of the New York Daily News] in terms of celebrating working-class heroes.'" John Nova Lomax, writer for the current Houston Press, called Byrd, "Houson's King of True-Life Noir" (metaphor, simile and narrative). Byrd's grandson, Sigman Mercer Byrd, Jr. (born 1964), is a writer.
- 1934–1936: Walter Cronkite, beginning 1933, attended the University of Texas at Austin for two years, studying political science and economics. While a student, Cronkit was Campus Correspondent for the Press, and later, a reporter for Scripps-Howard bureau covering events at the Texas State Capitol. He left in 1936 to join KCMO in Kansas City.
- 1949–1950: Marjorie Hunter (1922–2001) graduated from Elon College in 1942 and, from 1961 until 1986, was a Washington Correspondent for The New York Times. She had worked as a reporter for the Press from 1949 to 1950.
- 1928–1931: Robert Cunningham Humphreys (1905–1965), after studying at Columbia University from 1926 to 1928, began his journalism career at the Press. He went on to become a publicity director for the Republican Party and GOP strategist. His career at the Press was short because, in 1931, he told the Press' City Editor that he had worked as a reporter for the New York World – which, reportedly, was untrue.
- 1932–1936: Bonnie Tom Robinson (maiden; 1907–1993), born in Mineral Wells, began her newspaper career sometime before 1932 as a reporter for the Press. She married George Burnett Carmack October 24, 1943, at Fort Riley, Kansas, while George was serving in the Army as a Captain.

=== Artists, illustrators, cartoonists ===
- Sidney Hyman Van Ulm (1894–1978) joined the Press in 1925, where he drew cartoons for public relations, public service announcements, sports, legal trials, and advertisements. Ulm also was the golf editor of the Press for 37 years.
- Ed Franklin (né Edward Livingston Franklin; 1921–2006), a self-taught artist, born in Chireno, Texas, after World War II, by the late 1940s, joined the art department of the Press. He did illustration work, and a few cartoons. During the mid-1950s, The Saturday Evening Post, Argosy, and True published his work.

=== Business managers ===
- 1911–1913: Clarence Emile Gilliam (1879–1947) was, on the inaugural masthead of September 25, 1911, identified as Business Manager. By 1918, he was with the Cincinnati Post. For Scripps-Howard, from about 1922, he became the Business Manager for the Warren Tribune Chronicle and had also been associated with newspapers in Toledo, Cleveland, and Denver (1914).
- 1919–1921: Ward Carlton Mayborn (1879–1958) was general manager of the Press. One of his sons and son's wife, Frank Willis Mayborn (1903–1987) and Sue Mayborn (née Anyse Sue White) are the namesakes of the Frank W. and Sue Mayborn School of Journalism at the University of North Texas.
- 1939–1964: Ray Lyman Powers (1900–1983) was, from as early as 1932, Advertising Manager for the Press. In 1936, he was promoted to Advertising Director, and, in 1939, to Business Manager. Born in Barrington, Illinois, he had, in 1919, as a freshman, attended the University of Minnesota. In 1922, he earned a B.S. degree in General Business from the University of Illinois Urbana-Champaign.

== Houston Press buildings ==
Beginning May 1913, the Press moved from 709 Louisiana Street to a new building at Capitol Avenue and Bagby Street. In 1928, the Houston Press erected a $500,000 (estimated equivalent of $7.19 million in 2024) two-story, 45,000 square foot (4,200 m^{2}) building (which formally opened February 14, 1928) at the corner of Rusk and Chartres Streets (2001 Rusk Street). It was designed in an Italianate-style by Howell & Thomas, a Cleveland firm.

- 2 photos

== Selected articles ==
- Byrd, Sigman (October 1, 1947). "Those Flowering Shrubs Do Her Inspire – So of Making Rhymes She Doesn't Tire". Houston Press – via Internet Archive.
- Byrd, Sigman (October 2, 1947). "Doctor Fears for America; Her Soil Is Fed by the Wrong Type of 'Monopolistic' Fertilizer". Houston Press – via Internet Archive.
- Byrd, Sigman (October 3, 1947). "Proud Sam Houston Walks on Soil in Full Uniform, But Busy Historians Fail to Stare". Houston Press – via Internet Archive.
- Byrd, Sigman (October 4, 1947). "Jim Dudley Lifts Bray's Bayou Drawbridge, Hopes Young 'Gad-About' Never Gets His Job". Houston Press – via Internet Archive.
- Byrd, Sigman (October 6, 1947). "'Take a Card,' Phones Mysterious Howard; 'It's the Nine of Diamonds – Right?' Right!". Houston Press – via Internet Archive.
- Byrd, Sigman (October 7, 1947). "Persons Who Can't Roll Spaghetti Should Wear Bibs, Junior Decided – They Do, and Like Them". Houston Press – via Internet Archive.
- Byrd, Sigman (December 31, 1951). "A Cup of Kindness at the Big Casino". Houston Press – via Internet Archive.
- Byrd, Sigman (July 31, 1952). "Blondie La Guera Puts Away Her Whip". Houston Press – via Internet Archive.
- "Digital Sig Byrd Archive – Houston Press Columnist Sigman Byrd, a Mid-Century Chronicler of Houston People and Places Long Gone" – via WordPress.

== Bibliography ==
=== References ===
- "Webb C. Artz". Broadcasting (obituary). Vol. 21, no. 1. New York City. July 7, 1941. p. 47 – via Internet Archive.
- Byrd, [Lyman] Sigman (1955). Sig Byrd's Houston. Viking Press. OCLC 612984920 (all editions).
- Connelly, Richard (né Richard Francis Connelly; 1957–2020) (July 20, 2009). "Walter Cronkite's Houston, Or What's Left Of It". Houston Press.
- Cottrell, T[aylor] C[osby], Jr. (born 1944) (2019). "Vol. 1: Cottrell Ancestry". Cottrell–Lashbrook–Brashear–Campbell Family Lineage – Ancestry of Taylor Cosby Cottrell, Jr. Rockledge, Florida: Self-published via Lulu.com. p. 102 – via Google Books. ISBN 978-0-3597-5268-3, OCLC 1126338961.
- "Consumer Price Index (estimate) 1800–2024". Federal Reserve Bank of Minneapolis.
- Dallas Morning News (March 21, 1964). "Sale of Houston Press Closes 52-Year Career" (UPI). Vol. 115, no. 173. p. 4 (section 2) – via GenealogyBank.com.
- Devlin, Cynthia Marshall (March 2021). "Franklin, Edward Livingston (1921–2006)". Handbook of Texas Online. Texas State Historical Association.
- Dobie, J. Frank (March 13, 1955). "The Drift of Life – Sig Byrd's Houston". The New York Times Book Review. p. 21 – via TimesMachine.
- "Retiring City Editor Honored". Editor & Publisher. Vol. 57, no. 17. New York City. September 20, 1924. p. 34 – via Google Books.
- "New M.E. in Houston – Dudley Davis Gets Press Promotion Following Resignation of Artz". Editor & Publisher. Vol. 62, no. 28. New York City. November 30, 1929. p. 22 – via Internet Archive.
- "Joins Houston Press". Editor & Publisher. Vol. 64, no. 44. New York City. March 19, 1932. p. 8 – via Internet Archive.
- "Houston Press Dies at 52; Chronicle Buys Its Assets – Jones Family Paper Gains Edge in Circulation Race With Post". Editor & Publisher. Vol. 97, no. 13. New York City. March 28, 1964. pp. 13 & 127 – via Internet Archive.
- El Paso Herald-Post (March 4, 1939). "New Managers Named on Two Newspapers". Vol. 59, no. 54. p. 11 – via Newspapers.com.
- Flanders, Laura (November–December 2010). "Living Out Loud – Molly Ivins: A Rebel Life, by Bill Minutaglio and W. Michael Smith". The Women's Review of Books (book review). 27 (6). Wellesley, Massachusetts: Old City Publishing, Inc., Wellesley College: 3–5. JSTOR 41331671 . ISSN 0738-1433 (publication), OCLC 795974253 (all editions) (publication), OCLC 5546725673 (article). (alternate URL)
- Fort Worth Star-Telegram (March 21, 1964). "Houston Press Ends Operation After Purchase by Chronicle" (Associated Press). Vol. 84, no. 50 (Morning ed.). p. 5 (section 3) – via Newspapers.com.
- Gray, Lisa (March 21, 2011). "As 'Night Hawk,' Marvin Zindler Chronicled Seedy Houston – Exhibit Looks at Houston Through Marvin Zindler's Lens". Culture. Houston Chronicle.
- Handbook of Texas Online. "Houston Press". Texas State Historical Association.
- Houston – A History and Guide (sponsored by the Houston County Historical Society, Inc.). American Guide Series. Houston: The Anson Jones Press, founded 1929 by Herbert Herrick Fletcher (1892–1968). 1942. p. 208 – via Internet Archive → compiled by the Writers Program of the Work Projects Administration in the State of Texas.
- Houston Chronicle (June 25, 1993). "Ex-Houston Press Reporter, Bonnie Carmack, Dead at 86". p. A31. ProQuest 395472804 (U.S. Newsstream database).
- Houston Post (September 26, 1911). "New Afternoon Paper". Vol. 27. p. 4 (column 2, bottom) – via Portal to Texas History.
- Indianapolis Star, The (October 17, 1965). "Obituaries – Robert Humphreys, GOP Strategist, Dies". Vol. 63, no. 134. p. 28 (section 3) – via Newspapers.com.
- Letter – From N[oel] S[tones] Macneish (1900–1964) (assistant to Roy W. Howard) to Mr. G[eorge] B[ertrand] Parker [Sr.] (1886–1949) (April 21, 1927). Regarding the Resignation of C.J. Lilley from the Houston Press Company (letter). The Scripps-Howard Newspapers – via Indiana University Bloomington Library, Roy W. Howard Papers, 1892–1964.
- Letter (confidential) – Roy W. Howard to George Burnett Carmack and Ray Powers (January 16, 1950). Regarding a Lunch Conversation With Oveta Culp Hobby of the Houston Post With an Eye on the Possibility of Acquiring the Newspaper. The Scripps-Howard Newspapers – via Indiana University Bloomington Library, Roy W. Howard Papers, 1892–1964 (see Oveta Culp Hobby).
- Lomax, John Nova (born 1970) (November 20, 2009). "Houston 101: Sig Byrd, Houston's King of True-Life Noir". Houston Press. → The author, is (i) a great grandson of musicologist John Lomax (1867–1948) and educator/folklorist Ruby Terrill Lomax (1886–1961) (ii) grandnephew of musicologist Alan Lomax, (iii) grandnephew of musician and folklorist Bess Lomax, and (iv) son of country music journalist John Marable Lomax III (born 1940).
- Men of Affairs and Representative Institutions of Houston and Environs – A Newspaper Reference Work (PDF) (Compiled by the Houston Press Club). Houston: W.H. Coyle & Company, printers and stationers → William Hunter Coyle (1847–1911) and son, William Edmund Coyle (1875–1937). 1913 – via Rice University Digital Scholarship Archive (book dimensions are that of a journalist notepad). OCLC 2654346 (all editions).
- Minutaglio, Bill; Smith, W[illiam] Michael (born 1971) (2009). Molly Ivins: A Rebel Life (1st ed.). New York City: PublicAffairs. ISBN 9780786746231 – via Google Books. LCCN 2009-23034, ISBN 978-0-7867-4623-1, 0-7867-4623-8, OCLC 1066382920 (all editions).
- Nimmo, Dan D[ean], PhD (1933–2004); Newsome, Chevelle [Angelette] (1997). "Walter (Leland) Cronkite (Jr.)". Political Commentators in the United States in the 20th Century. Greenwood Press. pp. 71–79 – via Google Books. LCCN 96-28069, ISBN 0-3132-9585-9, OCLC 832937995 (all editions).
- "Sidney Van Ulm Collection". Houston Public Library, Digital Archives. OCLC 664762599.
- Strom, Steven R[ay] (born 1952) (2010). Houston Lost and Unbuilt (1st ed.). Austin: University of Texas Press. p. 68 – via Google Books (see Houston Lost and Unbuilt) LCCN 2009-17503, ISBN 978-0-292-72113-5, OCLC 560680875 (all editions).
- Theis, David (November 10, 1994). "The Lost Houston of Sig Byrd". Houston Press.
- Time (August 10, 1953). "The Press: Down With Damyankees". Time.
- U.S. Tax Case: July 6, 1973. Rehearing Denied July 27, 1973. Houston Chronicle Publishing v. United States. Casetext (Case No. 72-2881 → The Court of Appeals for the Fifth Circuit upheld a District Court's opinion that allowed the Houston Chronicle's publisher to depreciate the cost of subscription lists of the Press that it had acquired with the purchase of the Houston Press Company.)
- Weddle, Bob (November 20, 1948). "Newspaperman's Dear Comes True For Houston Scribe". The Odessa American. Vol. 23, no. 43. p. 8.
