= John Lomax Jr. =

American folklorist and land developer (1907–1974)

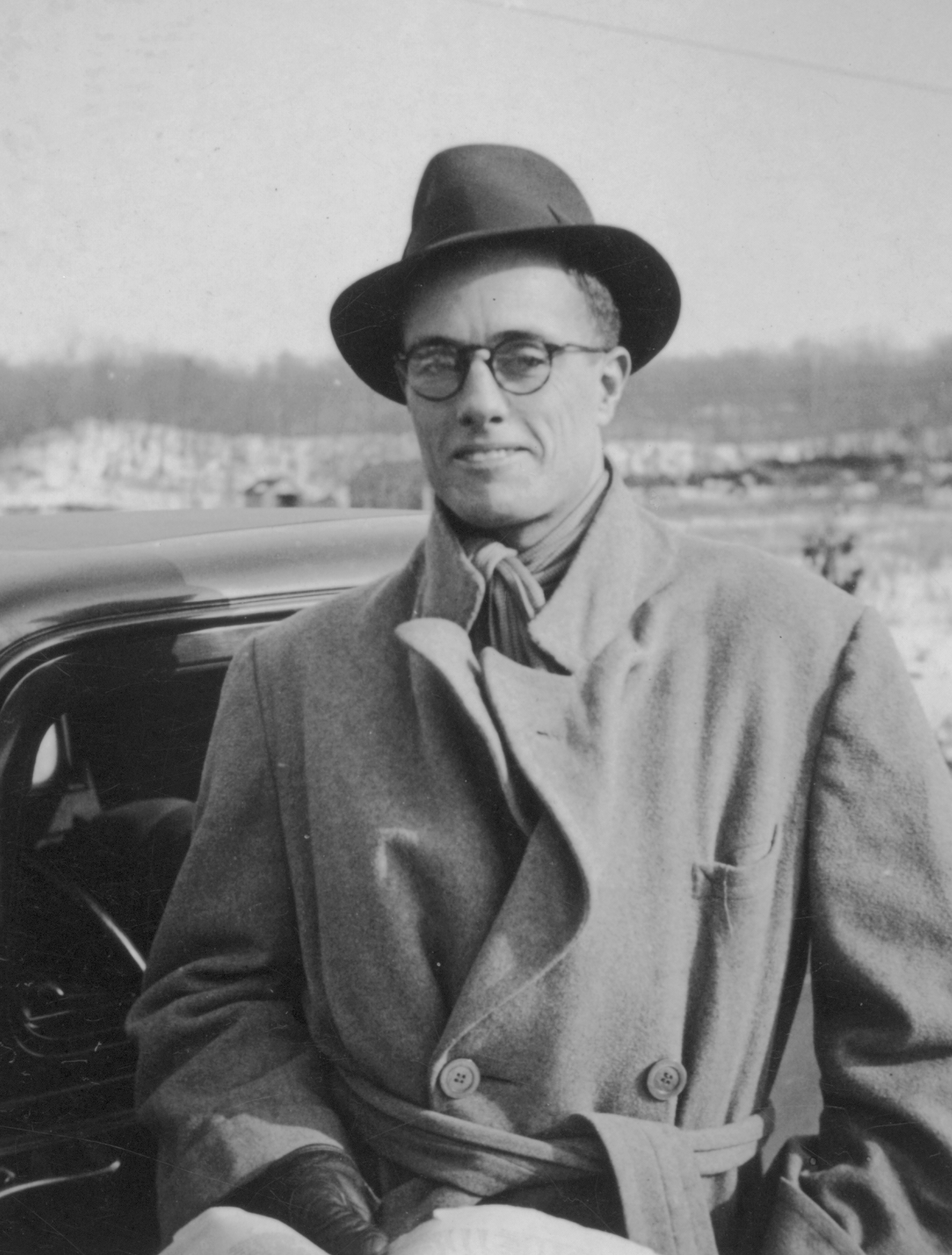
- Lomax Jr. c. 1930s
- Born: John Avery Lomax; June 14, 1907; Austin, Texas, U.S.
- Died: December 12, 1974 (aged 67); Houston, Texas, U.S.
- Occupations: Musicologist; folklorist; land developer
- Family: Alan Lomax, John Lomax, Bess Lomax Hawes
- Military career
- Allegiance: United States
- Branch: US Navy
- Service years: 1941-1945
- Rank: Lieutenant (junior grade)
- Conflicts: World War II

John A. Lomax Jr. (June 14, 1907 – December 12, 1974) was an American folklorist, performer, and land developer. He co-founded the Houston Folklore & Music Society and contributed to the preservation and publication of folklore and folk music during the 20th century, continuing the work of his father and brother. Lomax once defined folk music as "a story in song written no one knows when, no one knows where, no one knows by whom or even why."

== Biography ==
John A. Lomax Jr. was born in Austin, Texas, United States. He graduated from West High School in 1924, earning a B.A. with a cum laude distinction at the University of Texas in 1928. He began postgraduate work at Harvard Business School, but the start of the Great Depression prevented him from continuing. He had a brief stint at a bank in Corpus Christi until the bank began to fail.

In the early 1930s Lomax's mother, Bess Bauman Brown, died, sending his father into a depression. Lomax encouraged his folklorist father to embark on a second tour of the country, lecturing at universities and other groups while hunting down folk songs to add to his burgeoning collection. Lomax Jr. planned the tour and organised bookings, acting much like a manager for the folklorist family. After the folklore tour, Lomax Jr. worked as an auditor with the Federal Reconstruction Finance Corporation. As an auditor, his frequent travels across the country gave him the opportunity to find new folk songs, which he would send to his father to record for the Library of Congress.

At the age of 34, Lomax enlisted in the Navy and rose to the rank of Chief Petty Officer and trained new recruits to swim. While in the Navy, he met men who taught him more folk songs. His family moved to Virginia, New York, California, and, eventually, back to Texas. After the Navy, Lomax turned to a career as a land developer. He and his partner, Earl Gilbert, built several subdivisions in southern and northern parts of Houston, most notably Melrose Park and Southbrook. Lomax eventually developed West Little York Place, made of affordable single-family homes.

Lomax's first public performance was at Rice University on Dec. 8, 1950. His wife, Margaret, encouraged him to sing some of his favorite folk songs. This led to more performances over the years, including the University of California’s Folk Music Festival at Berkeley (1960), the first two Kerrville Folk Festivals, the Cullen Auditorium at the University of Houston, and countless hootenannies.

In 1951, Lomax founded the Houston Folklore & Music Society with Ed Badeaux, Harold V. Belikoff, Howie Porper, Pete Rose, and Chester Bower. The HFMS sought to preserve and celebrate folklore and folk music with monthly meetings that were open to the public. Membership dues included a subscription to the Society’s monthly publication, The Cottonpatch Rag. At meetings, members would sing and play guitars, banjos, fiddles - no electric instruments or drums permitted.

The HFMS’s ranks included Buster Pickens, Lightnin’ Hopkins, Mance Lipscomb, Townes Van Zandt, Frank Davis, Lucinda Williams, Guy Clark, and K.T. Oslin. The group facilitated first meetings between many of these fledgling artists, in addition to giving them a space to play music and share songs. The HFMS staged group concerts in the Jewish Community Center and the University of Houston, while solo acts frequented the club circuit.

Lomax was known for his rendition of Lead Belly’s "Take This Hammer" at HFMS meetings. The only accompaniment to his baritone voice was an axe and stump; he would punctuate the end of each line with a swing of the axe.

Lomax was responsible for introducing filmmaker Les Blank to Lightnin’ Hopkins, Mance Lipscomb, and Clifton Chenier. Blank made The Blues Accordin’ to Lightnin’ Hopkins, A Well Spent Life (on Lipscomb), and Spend it All (on Chenier). Lomax also managed Lightnin’ for about ten years, starting in the mid-1950s.

In 1956, Lomax made the John A. Lomax Jr. Sings American Folksongs album. He also performed with Ed Badeaux, Jim McConnell, Howard Porper, and Jim Rose, a group from the Houston Folklore Society, who called themselves The Tex-i-an Boys. The group was featured on the Songs of Texas album. Lomax is also featured on Unexpurgated Folk Songs of Men, a raunchy folk album highlighted by Hopkins' delivery of "the dozens." The album was never commercially released due to its collection of "dirty" songs. Lomax also contributed "Long John" to the 1972 album, Rod Kennedy Presents Kerrville Folk Festival, joining Peter Yarrow, Mance Lipscomb, Steve Fromholz, Carolyn Hester, and others.

In 1967, Lomax discovered a lost manuscript that his father had written. Lomax wrote an introduction for the book and it was published as Cow Trails & Cattle Camps by William D. Wittliff's Encino Press.

In 1969, Lomax recorded himself singing 160 of his favorite folk songs. His son, John Lomax III, eventually rediscovered these tapes and selected 16 to create the album FOLK in 2017.

Lomax suffered a fatal stroke at home on December 12, 1974. His lifelong celebrations of folklore and music carry on through the still-regular meetings of the HFMS. His younger son, Joe, followed in his footsteps as a performer, often appearing with family friend Hally Wood. His older son, John M. Lomax (aka John Lomax III), and grandson, John Nova Lomax, continued the family tradition by writing extensively about music and musicians.

== Family ==
John Avery Lomax Jr. was the son of John Avery Lomax, the pioneering folklorist who collected and performed folk songs across America. He was a brother to Shirley Lomax, Alan Lomax, and Bess Lomax. John and his wife, Margaret, were parents to John Lomax III and Joseph Franklin Lomax, a journalist, publisher, photographer, and filmmaker (1949–1988).
