= Clyde Waddell =

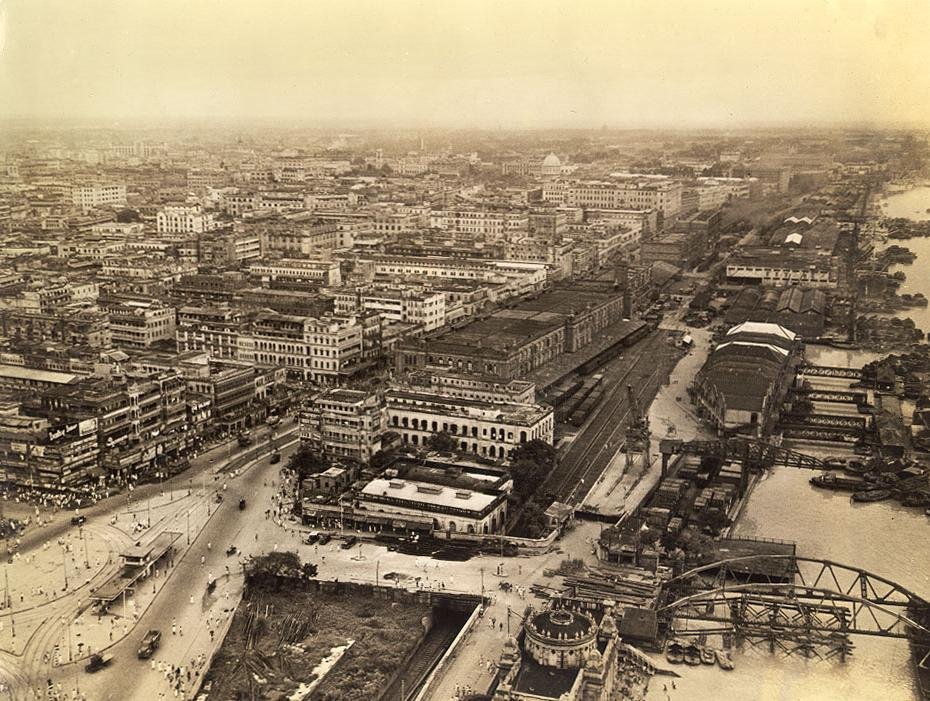

Clyde Waddell (né Joe Clyde Waddell; 20 June 1915 Sherman, Texas – 11 February 1997 Houston) was an American military photographer known for his photographs of Calcutta in 1945.

== A Yank's Memories of Calcutta ==
Waddell was chief photographer for the Houston Press before entering the United States Army and deploying to the India-Burma Theatre. As a sergeant in November 1943, he was attached to the Public Relations Staff of South East Asia Command 'with the express purpose of acting as personal press photographer for Supreme Allied Commander Admiral Lord Louis Mountbatten.' He accompanied Mountbatten throughout Southeast Asia until February 1945, when he was assigned as news photographer to Phoenix Magazine, 'a 24-page picture weekly sponsored by the combined U.S.-British command'.

On leave in Calcutta after the liberation of Singapore, Waddell, at the behest of his friends, took a number of photographs of Calcutta. The annotated images documented life in the city as well as the points of view of the American GIs stationed there. They proved to be so popular that Waddell eventually compiled and released them as a photographic album of 60 prints titled A Yank's Memories of Calcutta.

== Gallery ==
Photographs by Clyde Waddell
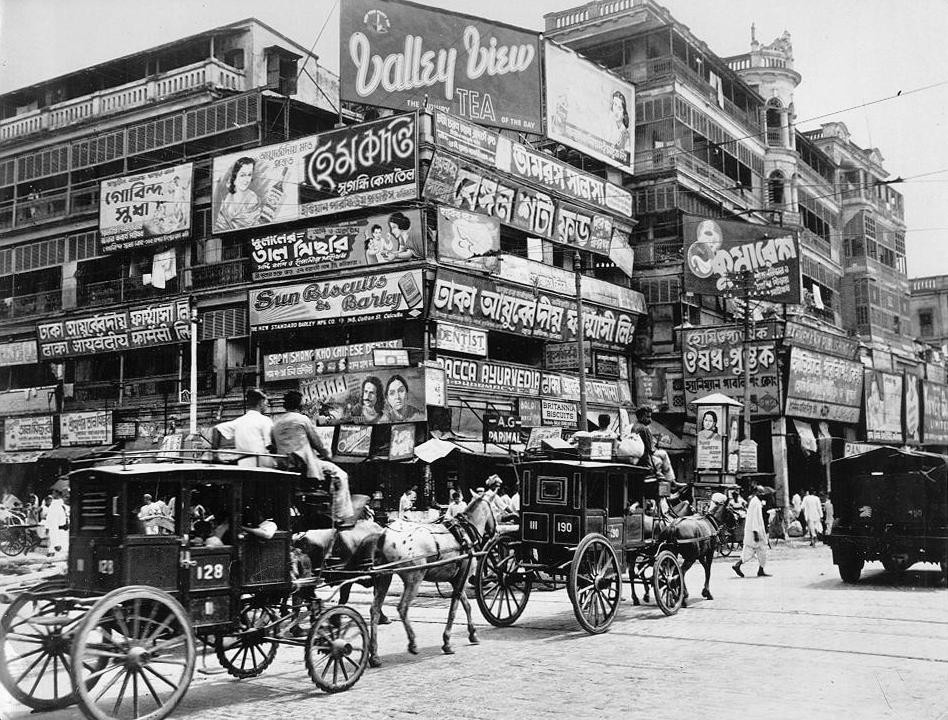
A bewildering mass of billboards at the corner of Harrison Street (Burra Bazaar) and Strand Road, Calcutta, 1945.

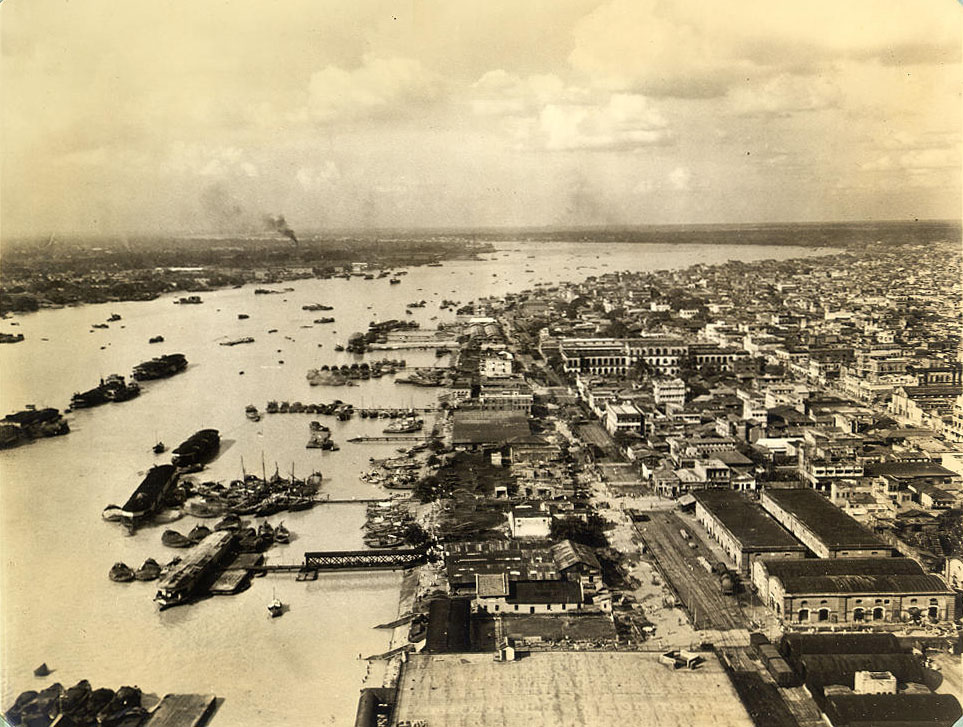
Hooghly river and part of Calcutta's east bank, 1945.

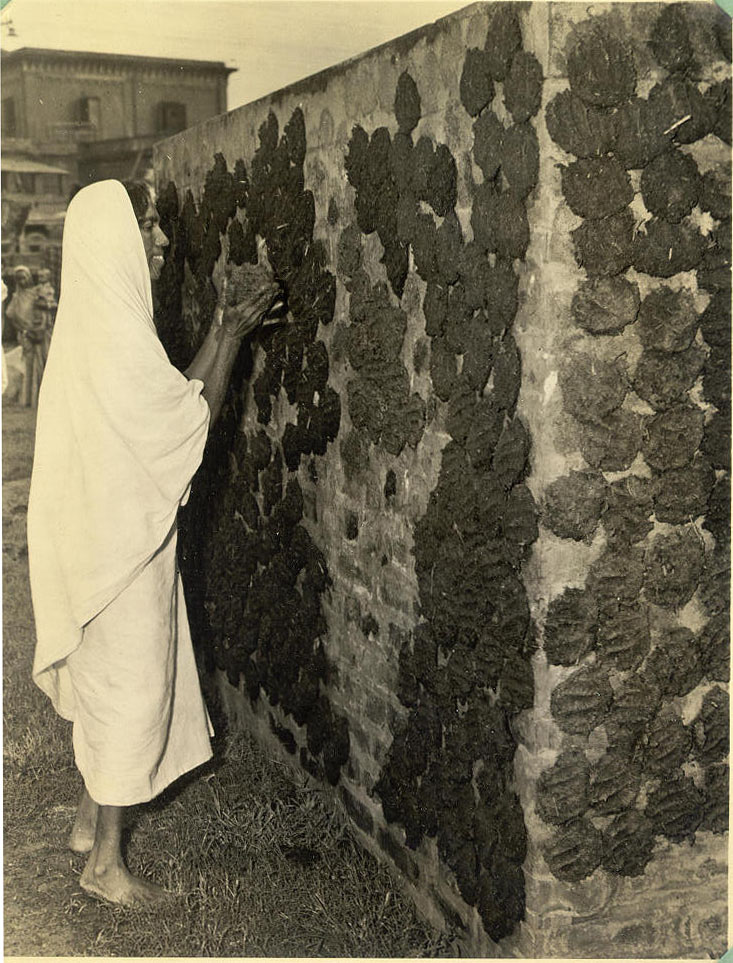
"Patty-cake Annie" is the nickname tagged to the makers of India's most plentiful fuel by American Soldiers, Calcutta, 1945

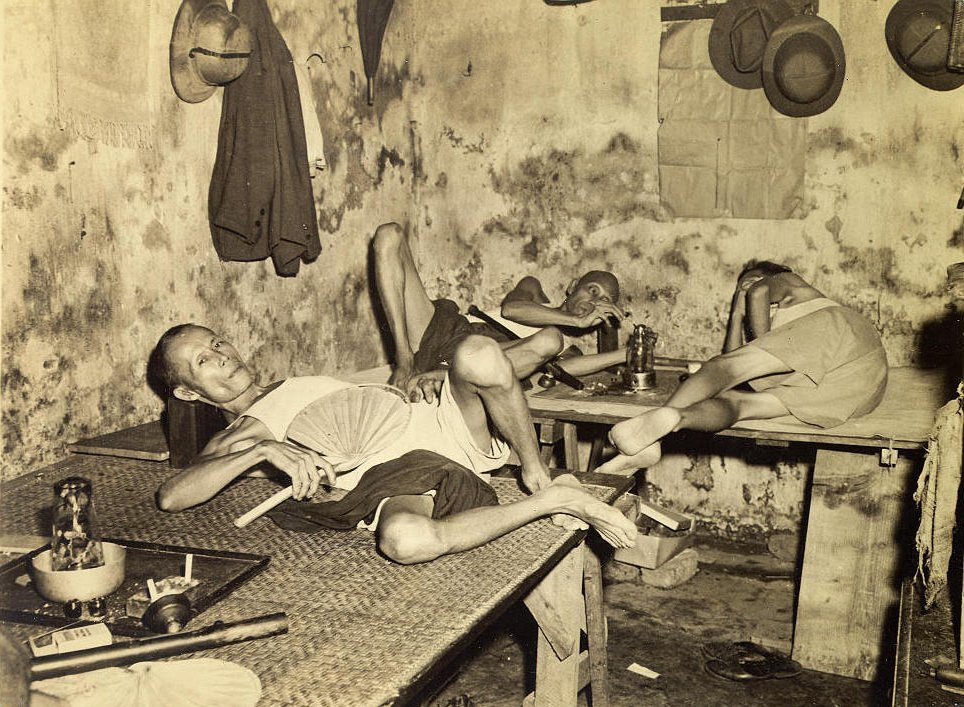
Opium den in Chinatown, Calcutta, 1945.
