= Charles Henry Nimitz =

American politician

Member of the Texas House of Representatives from the 89th district
- In office 1890–1892

Personal details
- Born: Karl Heinrich Nimitz; November 9, 1826 Bremen, Free Hanseatic City of Bremen, German Confederation
- Died: April 28, 1911 (aged 84) Fredericksburg, Texas, U.S.
- Resting place: Der Stadt Friedhof; 30°16′16″N 98°51′42″W
- Spouse: Sophie Dorothea Mueller (m. 1848; died 1877)
- Children: 12

Military service
- Branch/service: Confederate States Army
- Rank: Captain
- Unit: The Gillespie Rifles (Texas Milita Unit)
- Battles/wars: American Civil War

Charles Henry Nimitz (born Karl Heinrich Nimitz; (November 9, 1826 – April 28, 1911) was a German-born, Texas-based state politician, hotel owner and seaman.

== Early life ==
Karl Heinrich Nimitz Jr. was born in Bremen in Germany on November 9, 1826, to merchant seaman Karl Heinrich Nimitz Sr. and his wife Dorothea Magdalena Dressel.

Like his father before him, he was already a veteran seaman before the Nimitz family immigrated to South Carolina in the early 1840s, and later became part of the Adelsverein colonization experiment in the newly annexed state of Texas. In 1852, he built the Nimitz Hotel in Fredericksburg, Texas, in the United States.

The Nimitz roots can be traced to membership in Knights of the Sword in the 13th century. In 1644, Major Ernst von Nimitz served under Carl Gustav Wrangel of Sweden. Major Nimitz relocated in 1648 to an area near Hanover, Germany. Later generations became cloth merchants and dropped the "von" from the family name. Karl Heinrich Nimitz Sr. left the mercantile business and became a merchant seaman. Karl Jr. followed in his footsteps at age 14.

== Texas ==
The family originally emigrated to Charleston, South Carolina, beginning with the three oldest children in 1840, Karl Sr. and Dorothea in 1843, and Karl Jr. in 1844. Karl Jr. became fascinated by stories about Texas, and in 1846 joined the Adelsverein colonists who settled in Fredericksburg with John O. Meusebach. In Fredericksburg, Karl Jr. changed his name to Charles Henry Nimitz. On December 15, 1847, Nimitz became one of the petitioners for creation of Gillespie County. He briefly worked as a bookkeeper for a cypress lumber company, and in 1851 joined the Texas Rangers.

=== Nimitz Hotel ===
In 1852, Nimitz built what locals referred to as the Steamboat Hotel because of the ship's bow front. The adobe Nimitz Hotel had its own saloon and brewery, a ballroom that doubled as a theatre, a smokehouse, and a bath-house. In its heyday, the hotel hosted such guests as Horace Greeley, Johnny Ringo, President Rutherford B. Hayes, James Longstreet, Phil Sheridan, William Sydney Porter and Ulysses S. Grant. Robert E. Lee, who was stationed at nearby Fort Mason prior to the Civil War, visited so often that Nimitz gave Lee his own room and exhibited it to guests when Lee was not in residence. After the war, the hotel became a stage stop. Nimitz would entertain the guests with practical jokes on the customers, and humorous stories. Nimitz deeded the hotel over to his son Charles H Nimitz Jr. in 1906.

The hotel he built now houses the National Museum of the Pacific War. The Nimitz Hotel was designated a Recorded Texas Historic Landmark in 1989, Marker number 10089.

=== Military duty ===
During the Civil War, Nimitz organized the Gillespie Rifles and was commissioned captain of that group by the Confederacy.

=== State legislature ===
In 1890, Nimitz represented District 89, Gillespie, Comal and Blanco counties, in the Twenty-second Texas Legislature.

=== Grandson Chester Nimitz ===
He was the grandfather of, and role model for, Fleet Admiral Chester Nimitz. Anna Henke Nimitz, the wife of his son Chester Bernard Nimitz became pregnant with their only child Chester William Nimitz. The senior Chester died before his son was born on February 24, 1885. Grandfather Charles Henry Nimitz served as a father figure and role model the first five years of little Chester's life. In 1890, the widow Nimitz married her husband's brother William Nimitz and moved with him to Kerrville where he managed the St. Charles Hotel. While still a teenager, Chester was accepted for enrollment in the United States Naval Academy, where he graduated seventh out of a class of 114. Chester Nimitz rose to the rank of Commander-in-Chief of the U.S. Pacific Forces in World War II. He is also a great-grandfather to World War II and Korean War Rear Admiral Chester Nimitz Jr..

== Later years ==
After John O. Meusebach retired to Loyal Valley, Texas, Charles Henry Nimitz made the half-day's ride to the Mason County community to spend the day with Meusebach at his residence. They reminisced about their years of friendship, and Meusebach gave Nimitz a tour of his orchards and gardens. Nimitz later gave an interview about the visit to the Fredericksburg newspaper Das Wochenblatt, detailing Meusebach's horticultural achievements.

== Personal life ==
In 1848, Nimitz married Sophie Dorothea Mueller. The couple had twelve children, nine of whom lived to adulthood.

Sophia died in 1877 and is buried at Der Stadt Friedhof in Fredericksburg.

== Death ==
He died on April 28, 1911, in the hotel he built. He is buried next to Sophia.
