= Leonidas Warren Payne Jr. =

Leonidas Warren Payne Jr. (July 12, 1873 – June 16, 1945) was an American linguist and professor of English at the University of Texas. He was a co-founder of the Texas Folklore Society along with John Lomax, edited the first anthology of Texas literature, and was one of the first to recognize the talent of e.e. cummings.

Payne was born in Auburn, Alabama. He was the eldest son of Leonidas Warren Payne Sr., who was sometimes called Lonnie Payne, and attended the Auburn High School. He received bachelor's and master's degrees from what was then-called the Agricultural and Mechanical College of Alabama in Auburn in 1892 and 1893, and a Ph.D. from the University of Pennsylvania in 1904. While at Auburn, Leonidas was the first initiate into the newly formed Upsilon Chapter of Pi Kappa Alpha. He taught English at the Southwest Alabama Agricultural School, the State Normal School of Alabama, and the University of Pennsylvania prior to being awarded his Ph.D. From 1904 to 1906, he was the associate editor of Worcester's Dictionary, and in 1906 was appointed an assistant professor at Louisiana State University.

After a few months at Louisiana State, Payne was offered and accepted a position on the faculty at the University of Texas. In 1909, he and John Lomax founded the Texas Folklore Society, of which Payne was the first president. In 1919, he was elected full professor at Texas. In 1928, he published the first anthology of Texas literature, A Survey of Texas Literature.

Payne, at Texas, was one of the first teachers of American literature. He maintained friendships with Edward Arlington Robinson, Carl Sandburg, and Robert Frost. He mentored Stark Young and J. Frank Dobie, and was one of the first to champion e.e. cummings. Payne published eight books including History of American Literature (1919) and Texas Poems (1936).

Payne retired from the University of Texas in 1943, and died in 1945.

A biography on Payne entitled "Rare Integrity: A Portrait of L. W. Payne, Jr." was written by Hansen Alexander and published in 1986.
