= Houston Folklore & Music Society =

Folk music group based in Houston

The Houston Folklore & Music Society is a group dedicated to keeping alive traditional folk music and lore.

== History ==
In 1951, Houston hosted its first National Folk Festival. Though the festival itself was not majorly successful, it connected a group of folk music lovers in Houston. Soon after, the Houston Folklore Society (later known as the Houston Folklore and Music Society) was founded by John Alan Lomax Jr., Ed Badeaux, Harold V. Belikoff, Howie Porper, Pete Rose, and Chester Bower. The HFMS was created with the intent to preserve and celebrate folklore and folk music from around the country.

The HFMS has held monthly meetings at the Jewish Community Center, the Downtown YMCA, and the Hermann Park Pavilion. Each member present gets the chance to perform, be it telling a story or singing a song. Though the meetings were generally centred around the guitar, members brought banjos, fiddles, dulcimers, tin whistles, spoons, and bones to make music. Occasionally, members held concerts at the Jewish Community Center and the University of Houston’s Cullen Auditorium and Anderson Library. They also formed a Hootenanny group, which performed at the Alley Theatre. The HFMS has invited and sponsored performances by artists including Pete Seeger, Doc Watson, and the Foggy Mountain Boys.

By June 1966, the HFMS had begun publishing a monthly newsletter. By 1968, it was named the Cotton Patch Rag. The Cotton Patch Rag included a monthly calendar of Houston-based folk music events, reviews, and articles contributed by different members. The Rag is still produced and distributed to members of the HFMS today.

In 1980, the HFMS began hosting regular concerts. By 1983, the Second Saturday Concerts had become a tradition that continues today, showcasing a wealth of acoustic music for members and the general public.

== Membership ==
The HFMS has been an incubator of musical talent in Houston, especially in the 1950s and 1960s. The regular meetings allowed singers and songwriters to share what they were working on and hone their craft. The meetings also facilitated introductions and the making of lifelong friendships at these meetings.

The Tex-i-an Boys was a group that formed from introductions made at HFMS meetings. The group was composed of John Lomax Jr., Ed Badeaux, Jim McConnell, Howard Porper, and Jim Rose. They released an album called Songs of Texas in 1961.
