= Amanda Julia Estill =

American folklorist (1882–1965)

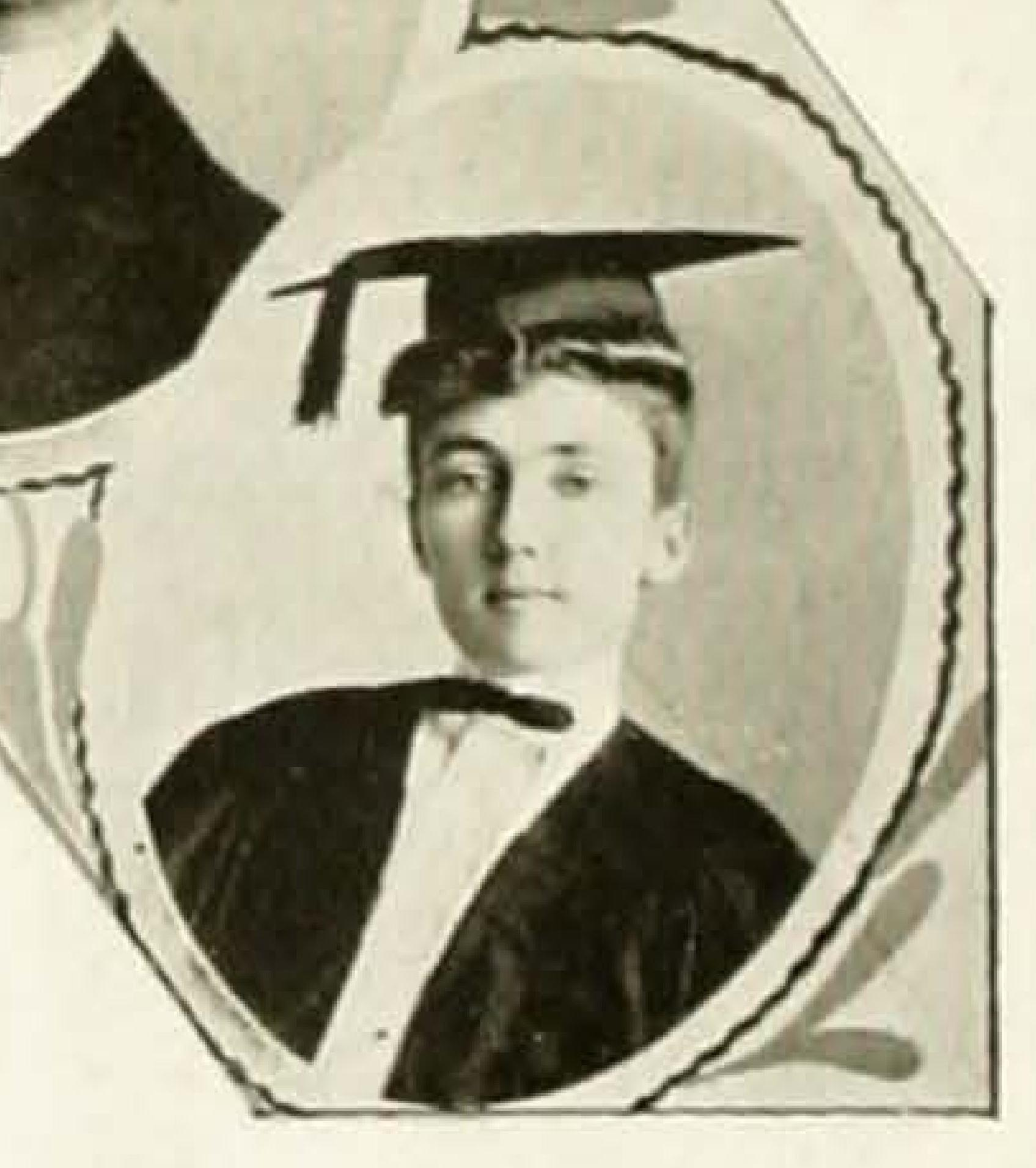
- Estill (1904)
- Born: October 27, 1882; Fredericksburg, Gillespie County, Texas, US
- Died: July 1, 1965 (aged 82); Fredericksburg, Gillespie County, Texas, US
- Burial place: Der Stadt Friedhof Cemetery
- Occupations: Educator, writer, folklorist

Amanda Julia Estill (1882 – 1965), also known simply as Julia Estill, was an American educator, writer, and folklorist.

== Biography ==
Amanda Julia Estill was born on October 27, 1882, in Fredericksburg, Texas, to parents Ellen Elizabeth (née Wiley) and James Thomas. She received a B.S. degree (1904) and an M.S. degree (1905) from the University of Texas at Austin.

After graduation she taught at Fredericksburg schools, including Fredericksburg High School and also served as a principal. In 1909, Estill had been an active member of the United Daughters of the Confederacy at the Fredericksburg, Texas chapter.

Estill was a member and former president (1923 to 1924) of the Texas Folklore Society, the Texas branch of the American Folklore Society (AFS). She published for the Texas Folklore Society and for the San Antonio newspapers, for more than 20 years. Estill was one of the first members of the Texas Folklore Society to publish information regarding Native American culture in Gillespie County in the article "Indian Pictographs Near Lange's Mill, Gillespie County (Illustrated)" (1925). Tribes living in Gillespie County included the Tonkawa, Comanche, Kiowa, and Lipan Apache peoples. Her writing had negative characterizations of Native Americans while simultaneously historicizing the white people in the story; this is a negative attribute often seen in the folklore genre. In 1954, she gathered information on the local German-originated folk games that were played locally and published the article "Children's Games in Fredericksburg" (1954).

She died on July 1, 1965, in Fredericksburg and is buried in Der Stadt Friedhof Cemetery.

== Publications ==
- Estill, Julia (1975). "Indian Pictographs Near Lange's Mill, Gillespie County (Illustrated)". In Dobie, J. Frank (ed.). Happy Hunting Ground. Wilson M. Hudson (contributions), L. W. Payne, Jr. (contributions), W. A. Whatley (contributions), F. S. Curtis, Jr. (contributions), J. Frank Dobie (contributions), John K. Strecker (contributions), Roy S. Scott (contributions), Hartman Dignowity (contributions), A. R. McTee (contributions), Malbone W. Graham, Jr. (contributions), Victor J. Smith (contributions), Mody C. Boatright (contributions), L. W. Payne, Jr. (contributions), John A. Lomax (contributions) (IV ed.). Dallas, TX: The Texas Folklore Society. ISBN 0-87074-149-7.
