= Der Stadt Friedhof =

Historic cemetery in Fredericksburg, Gillespie County, Texas

- Interactive map of Der Stadt Friedhof

Details
- Established: 1846
- Location: on Barons Creek, corner of E. Schubert and Lee Streets; Fredericksburg, Texas
- Country: United States
- Coordinates: 30°16′16″N 98°51′42″W
- No. of graves: 5000+plus
- Find a Grave: Der Stadt Friedhof

Der Stadt Friedhof, Fredericksburg, Texas

Der Stadt Friedhof (the town cemetery) is a pioneer cemetery established in 1846 along Barons Creek on the corner of East Schubert Street and Lee Street, in Fredericksburg, Texas. It is the oldest known cemetery within Fredericksburg and is the final resting place for many of the original German colonists who arrived when John O. Meusebach opened up the area to settlement.

== Background ==
When Herman Wilke laid out the town, a plot of land was set aside for the cemetery. The various denominations who worshiped in the Vereins Kirche were responsible for cemetery maintenance. In 1860, the Catholics broke away and started their own church, establishing their own cemetery, now known as the Old Pioneer Cemetery. In 1991 the three churches overseeing cemetery maintenance, plot sales and burials formed a 501c13 Cemetery Nonprofit Corporation called, Der Stadtische Friedhof Fredericksburg Inc. (IRS EIN 74-2610012). The churches were Bethany Lutheran, Holy Ghost Lutheran, and Zion Lutheran. There are upwards of 5,000 graves in Der Stadt Friedhof, not all of them currently marked, many unidentifiable due to the passage of time. Some of the graves had only wooden markers which rotted in time, and some graves were obliterated whenever Barons Creek overflowed its banks. During cholera epidemics many people were buried in mass graves. The oldest readable grave marker is dated 1849. Many of the tombstones are written in German. Rather than being grouped in family plots, the deceased have been buried in chronological order according to when they died. Section C is an exception where African America families were buried in family plots. Several of these African Americans were once slaves in Gillespie County.

The graves in Der Stadt Friedhof are noted for their artistic carvings and sculptures. What is possibly the last known work of sculptor Elisabet Ney, that of a tousled haired cherub resting over a grave and known as the 1906 Schnerr Memorial, can be found at Der Stadt Friedhof.

On May 5, 2000, the State of Texas recognized Der Stadt Friedhof as a State Historical Cemetery.

== Notable burials in Der Stadt Friedhof ==
- Joseph Wilson Baines (1846–1906) Grandfather of Lyndon Baines Johnson
- Ruth Ament Huffman Baines (1854–1936) Grandmother of Lyndon Baines Johnson
- Amanda Julia Estill (1882–1965) Educator, writer, and folklorist
- Lieutenant Louis J. Jordan (1890–1918) First Texan killed in World War I. Football player for the Texas Longhorns. The Louis Jordan Post of the American Legion in Fredericksburg is named in his honor.
- Hugo Emil Klaerner (1908–1982) Chicago White Sox pitcher
- Lisette Mueller (1852–1944) German Texas midwife who delivered Chester Nimitz
- John Peter Tatsch (1822–1907) Master cabinet maker. Tatsch's work is prized by collectors of Texas primitive furniture. His home is listed in the Historic American Buildings Survey of the United States Department of the Interior and its plans placed in the Library of Congress

=== Signers of petition to create Gillespie County buried in Der Stadt Friedhof ===
- Louis (Ludwig) Martin (1820–1864) (First sheriff of Gillespie County)
- Charles Henry Nimitz (1826–1911) (Grandfather of Fleet Admiral Chester Nimitz)

== See also ==
- History of Fredericksburg, Texas
