= Hally Wood =

American singer

- Born: Harriet Elizabeth Wood; September 29, 1922; Washington, D.C., U.S.
- Died: July 22, 1989 (aged 66) Houston, Texas, U.S.
- Genres: Folk
- Occupations: Musician, singer, musicologist
- Years active: Early 1940s – late 1980s
- Labels: Stinson, Elektra, Tannehill

Harriet Elizabeth "Hally" Wood (September 29, 1922 – July 22, 1989) was an American musician, singer and folk musicologist. She worked with John and Alan Lomax and participated in the publication of songbooks for the works of artists like Lead Belly and Woody Guthrie. She also performed as a singer and recorded solo and collaborative albums with folk singers such as Pete Seeger.

== Early life ==
She was born Harriet Elizabeth Wood in Washington, D.C., in 1922. She was the daughter of a U.S. Army doctor who had worked in Hawaii and the Philippines before settling in Texas in 1935, when she was 13 years old. Her father was a versatile musician, who taught Hally songs and how to play them on organ, piano and guitar. She was a classically trained musician and singer and, while studying music at the University of Texas at Austin, she met John and Alan Lomax and became interested in folk music.

== Career ==
After World War II, Wood moved to New York City to work with such folk musicians as Woody Guthrie, Lead Belly and Pete Seeger. As a musicologist, she transcribed a number of Lomax field recordings (collecting words and notes down on paper). She later also researched and transcribed several books of songs: one by Lead Belly (1959), then the New Lost City Ramblers Songbook (1964, later renamed Old-Time Stringband Songbook), and also two books of songs by Woody Guthrie (1972 and 1977, respectively).

As a singer, she had two solo albums in the early 1950s: Hally Wood Sings Texas Folksongs (Stinson Records label), and O' Lovely Appearance of Death (Elektra Records label). She appeared on several concert/compilation albums, sang in concerts with Pete Seeger, Lead Belly, Woody Guthrie, Jean Ritchie, and others in the NYC area, including a concert at Carnegie Hall on Saturday, December 21, 1957, with Sonny Terry and Dave Sears.

From the late 1950s into the early 1970s, Wood lived in Río Piedras, Puerto Rico, where she helped produce concerts, among other activities. On May 23, 1960, Alan Lomax visited her there and recorded 29 songs in a single day.

She worked on a book with Joseph Lomax about songs written by Townes Van Zandt, published in 1977. In its preface, she is credited with musical proof-reading and lyrics corrections. In 1980, Wood brought out a self-produced album in Houston, Songs to Live By (Tannehill Records label), and was beginning work on another in the mid-80s when she was diagnosed with cancer.

== Personal life ==
Wood was married three times:

- (1940–1947) John Henry Faulk (August 21, 1913 – April 9, 1990), a radio broadcaster, writer and activist with whom she had one daughter: Cynthia Tannehill Faulk Ryland (born in Austin, TX., November 28, 1943 - died in Elgin, TX., January 11, 2013)
- (1947–1954) Louis H. Gordon (born in New York, NY., November 15, 1915 – March 25, 2006), a veteran of the Spanish Civil War, Abraham Lincoln Brigade and labor organizer.
- (1958–1978) Robert Clarence McLeod Stephenson (born in San Francisco, CA., May 6, 1893 – died Austin TX., July 7, 1978), a teacher and professor of English.

== Discography ==
Solo

- Hally Wood Sings Texas Folksongs (195?)
- O' Lovely Appearance of Death (1953)
- Rio Piedras 5/60 (1960)
- Songs to Live By (1980)

== Bibliography ==
- Cohen, John; Seeger, Mike, eds. (1964). The New Lost City Ramblers Song Book. Musical transcriptions by Hally Wood. (first ed.). New York, NY: Oak Publications. ISBN 978-0-825-60046-3.
- Doerflinger, William M. (April 1, 1991) [First published 1951]. Bayard, Samuel P.; Wood, Hally; Wood, Joseph (eds.). Songs of the Sailor and Lumberman (2nd revised ed.). Chicago, Illinois: Meyerbooks Publishers. ISBN 978-0-916-63840-5.
- Guthrie, Woody (1972). Lampell, Millard (ed.). Tribute to Woody Guthrie as performed at Carnegie Hall 1968/Hollywood Bowl 1970. Music edited and transcribed by Hally Wood. (first ed.). New York, NY: TRO/Ludlow Music. ASIN B002H0VOSI.
- Guthrie, Woodrow Wilson (1977). Bell, Judy (ed.). 101 Woody Guthrie Songs including Bound for Glory. Lead sheet transcriptions: Hally Wood. (first ed.). New York, NY: Ludlow Music. ASIN B0000CWQU3.
- Lomax, John A.; Lomax, Alan; Wood, Hally, eds. (1959). Leadbelly : A Collection of World-Famous Songs By Huddie Ledbetter. Hally Wood, music editor; special note on Leadbelly's 12-string guitar by Pete Seeger. (first ed.). New York, NY: Folkways Music Publishers. ASIN B0010ZN7J0.
- Lomax, John A.; Lomax, Alan; Wood, Hally, eds. (1965) [First published 1959]. The Leadbelly Legend: A Collection of World-Famous Songs By Huddie Ledbetter. Hally Wood, music editor; special note on Leadbelly's 12-string guitar by Pete Seeger. (2nd revised and augmented ed.). New York, NY: TRO Folkways Music Publishers. ASIN B00H7JZH3C.
- Ritchie, Jean; Wood Gordon, Hally; Lomax, Alan, eds. (1953). A Garland of Mountain Song. Piano accompaniment by Hally Wood Gordon. (first ed.). New York, NY: Broadcast Music Inc. ASIN B000MYEMOO.
- Van Zandt, Townes (1977). Lomax, Joseph F.; Lomax, John M. (eds.). For the Sake of the Song. Musical proof-reading and lyrics corrections: Hally Wood. San Antonio, Texas: Wings Press. ISBN 978-0-930-32404-9.
- Weissman, Dick (2006) [First published 2005]. Which Side Are You On?: An Inside History of the Folk Music Revival in America (2nd revised ed.). London and New York City: Continuum International Publishing Group Ltd. ISBN 978-0-826-41914-9.
