= John Lomax III =

American journalist and music distributor (born 1944)

John Lomax III (born August 20, 1944) is an American journalist, music distributor, and manager who has worked with many country music and folk music musicians, such as Townes Van Zandt, Steve Earle, David Schnaufer, The Cactus Brothers, Kasey Chambers, and others. In 2010, Lomax received Country Music Association's Jo Walker-Meador International Award for marketing country music outside the United States.

== Biography ==
John Lomax III was born on August 20, 1944, in Geneva, New York. Shortly after he was born, the Lomax family moved to Houston, Texas, where he spent his childhood. Lomax attended West University Elementary, Pershing Junior High, and Lamar High School. After Lomax graduated from high school in 1962, he headed to University of Texas at Austin to study history. He graduated with a B.A. in 1967 and a MS in Library Science in 1970.

He grew up in a family of folklorists and music researchers, so Lomax spent a lot of time listening to music and exploring the Houston music scene when he was younger. He knew Lightnin' Hopkins, Mance Lipscomb, and many others through his father, John A. Lomax, Jr. Alan Lomax, John's uncle, was a documentarian of folk music whose recording work exists in the Library of Congress. Alan received the National Medal of Arts in 1986 and a National Academy of Recording Arts and Sciences in 2003.

== Music career ==
After a brief stint in New York and a return to Houston, Lomax moved to Nashville, Tennessee, in 1973. By the time he moved to Nashville, he already knew most of the Texan singer-songwriters living there who hung around Guy Clark and Townes Van Zandt; he also met artists like Rodney Crowell, Steve Young, and Richard Dobson. He originally went to Nashville for a recording session with Rocky Hill. Later, he worked as a publicist with Jack Clement's Information Services Incorporated, a division of Jack Music Incorporated.

Lomax saw Townes Van Zandt play for the first time in Austin, Texas, when he was attending college. In the mid-1970s, he worked with Guy Clark to encourage Van Zandt to move from Colorado to Nashville. Lomax became Van Zandt's manager when he finally arrived, though he had no management experience. Lomax gathered fans for "America's greatest songwriter" through an ad in Rolling Stone. The letters he received in response to the ad were "eloquently written", some said his songs had saved their lives. Lomax managed Van Zandt from 1976 to 1978, during which time Tomato Records re-released five of Van Zandt's old albums from the Poppy label, released the long-awaited Live at the Old Quarter, and produced the Flyin' Shoes album. During this time, Lomax and his brother Joe compiled For the Sake of the Song, a book of lyrics, sheet music, photos, and essays on Van Zandt. While managing Van Zandt, Lomax found the beginnings of deeply tangled copyrighting and financial issues that would beleaguer Van Zandt for the rest of his life. Lomax was replaced as manager by Lamar Fike before he could further investigate on Van Zandt's behalf.

When the Heartworn Highways director James Szalapski came to Nashville, Lomax recommended he focus the documentary on lesser-known artists on the rise, including Clark, Van Zandt, Charlie Daniels, David Allan Coe, and Steve Young. Lomax worked as talent coordinator for the documentary when filming began.

In 1974, Lomax met Steve Earle. He kept up with Earle for years and eventually worked as his manager from 1983 to 1986. Lomax was able to get Rick Blackburn's interest, but Earle's early singles for Blackburn's Epic label gained little traction. Lomax and Earle later headed to MCA, where Earle released the Guitar Town album (1986). The album reached the top of the Billboard country album chart and its titular track peaked at number 7 on the country singles chart. Guitar Town also brought Earle his first Grammy nominations for Best Male Country Vocal Performance and Best Country Song. Guitar Town was certified as a "Gold" album by the R.I.A.A. in 1999.

Lomax continued to manage acts after separating from Earle. These groups include David Schnaufer (1986-1994), The Cactus Brothers (1991-1996), Kimber Clayton (1996-2000), Kasey Chambers (1996-2001), and began working with Texas singer-songwriter Bianca De Leon in 2020.

In 2011, Lomax released Texas Guitar Legend, an album of Rocky Hill's unreleased 1977 recordings. Issued on his SFL label, Lomax licensed the album to England's Floating World Records in a project helmed by Pete Macklin.

SFL was begun in 1988 and released two CDs by "America's Dulcimer Champion", David Schnaufer and two multi-track singles by Kimber Clayton, "Jose Cuervo" and "Addicted to Love", both in the late '90s.

In 2017, Lomax III re-discovered tapes of his father singing old folk songs that had since faded out of public memory. He released a collection of sixteen of the solo, a cappella recordings on SFL as a CD titled FOLK.

Lomax works to distribute country and other music overseas through Roots Music Exporters in Nashville, a business he has been running since 1996. In 2010, Lomax was awarded the Jo Walker-Meador International Award by the Country Music Association which "recognizes outstanding achievement by an individual in advocating and supporting country music's marketing development in territories outside the United States."

He opened Lomax Global Music, an Amazon Marketplace enterprise with the assistance of Ryan Schemmel, in 2011, selling mainly single copies of hard-to-find CDs, DVDs and lps mainly to U.S. customers.

== Journalism & books ==
Lomax started a long career of music writing while he was attending college in Austin. While in Houston, he wrote for Space City!, an underground newspaper. In Nashville, he met Harvey Magee, who had started Hank, the only music magazine in the city at the time. In the early 1970s, Lomax also wrote for the River City Review and Zoo World, monthly music magazines operating out of Memphis and Fort Lauderdale, respectively.

In 1980, Lomax, Thom King, and Richard Harbert started the Nashville Gazette, with Kathy Mattea as the magazine's receptionist. Lomax bankrolled the magazine, wrote as a music editor, and worked as the behind-the-scenes editor in chief. The Gazette ran early features on Rodney Crowell, Lacy Dalton, Gail Davies, and others. Lomax started his "Song City Serenades" column during the Nashville Gazette period; after the magazine folded a few months later, Lomax began a similar news column for The Aquarian Weekly.

Lomax has written several books. He and his brother, Joe, created For the Sake of the Song, the Townes van Zandt Songbook in 1978. Nashville: Music City USA (1986) provided an introduction to the city's musical history and current scene, with more than 200 photographs and "The Ultimate Country Music Chart": an summary of achievements of more than 100 country stars. Lomax cowrote The Country Music Book in 1988. In 2001, he wrote Red Desert Sky: The amazing adventures of the Chambers family, which recounted the career of Kasey Chambers and family.

Lomax wrote columns for country music magazines in Australia (C (Country Update) and England (Country Music International, Country Music People) through 2017, marking 37 years of chronicling of country and Nashville music events and artists. In 2017, he wrote a lengthy retrospective article, The John Lomax Legacy for Texas Music magazine, chronicling the music highlights of himself, his grandfather John A. Lomax, father, John A. Lomax Jr. and son John Nova. The 6,500-word feature was illustrated with rare photographs and is the only source of information presenting the work of all four John Lomaxes from the 1880s to 2017.

That same year Lomax began to donate his work and archival material for the Fondren Library's Woodson Research Center at Rice University and the Country Music Foundation Library and Media Center.

In 2019, nearly 20 of his personal photographs and archival pictures were used in the Ken Burns Country Music documentary TV show, DVD, and book.

== Family ==
John Lomax III is the son of John Lomax Jr. and Margaret Marable Lomax and grandson of John Lomax; both John Lomax Jr. and Sr. were pioneering folklorists famous for documenting, recording, and performing folk music traditions in the first half of the 20th century. Lomax III's uncle, Alan Lomax, and aunt, Bess Lomax Hawes, also had careers in music and folk traditions and have been honored with the National Medal of Arts.

Lomax III is the father of John Nova and Amanda Margaret. John Nova Lomax was a Texas based freelance writer and editor who died in 2023 at the age of 53. Texas Monthly; Amanda Lomax is a photographer and artist now living in Nashville.
