= John Lomax =

American musicologist and folklorist (1867–1948)

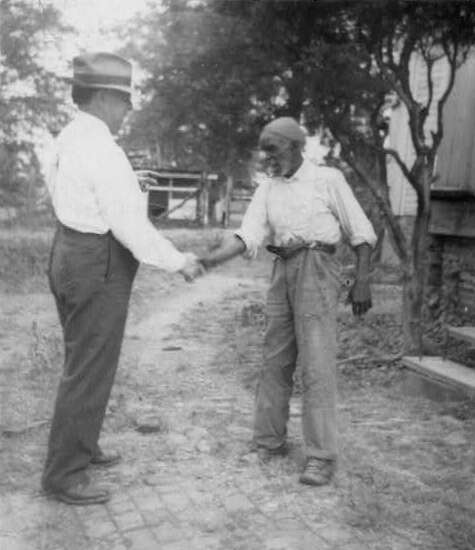
- Lomax (left) shaking hands with musician "Uncle" Rich Brown in 1940
- Born: John Avery Lomax; September 23, 1867; Goodman, Mississippi, U.S.
- Died: January 26, 1948 (aged 80); Greenville, Mississippi, U.S.
- Occupations: Musicologist; folklorist; archivist
- Known for: Preservation of American Folk Music
- Family: Alan Lomax, John Lomax Jr., Bess Lomax Hawes

John Avery Lomax (September 23, 1867 – January 26, 1948) was an American teacher, a pioneering musicologist, and a folklorist who did much for the preservation of American folk music. He was the father of Alan Lomax, John Lomax Jr. and Bess Lomax Hawes, also distinguished collectors of folk music.

== Early life ==
The Lomax family originally came from England with William Lomax, who settled in Rockingham County in what was then the Province of North Carolina. John Lomax was born in Goodman in Holmes County in central Mississippi, to James Avery Lomax and the former Susan Frances Cooper. In December 1869, the Lomax family traveled by ox cart from Mississippi to Texas. John Lomax grew up in central Texas, just north of Meridian in rural Bosque County. His father raised horses and cattle and grew cotton and corn on the 183 acres (0.74 km^{2}) of bottomland that he had purchased near the Bosque River. He was exposed to cowboy songs as a child. At around nine he befriended Nat Blythe, a former slave hired as a farmhand by James Lomax. The friendship, he wrote later, "perhaps gave my life its bent." Lomax, whose own schooling was sporadic because of the heavy farmwork he was forced to do, taught Blythe to read and write, and Blythe taught Lomax songs including "Big Yam Potatoes on a Sandy Land" and dance steps such as "Juba". When Blythe was 21 years old, he took his savings and left. Lomax never saw him again and heard rumors that he had been murdered. For years afterward, he always looked for Nat when he traveled around the South.

When he was about to turn twenty-one, and his legal obligation to work as apprentice on his father's farm was coming to an end, his father permitted him to take the profits from the crops of one of their fields. Lomax used this, along with the money from selling his favorite pony, to pay to further his education. In the fall of 1887, he attended Granbury College in Granbury and in May 1888, he graduated and eventually became a teacher. He began his first job as a teacher at a country school in Clifton, southeast of Meridian. As time went on, he grew tired of the low pay and country-school drudgery and he applied for work at Weatherford College in Weatherford in Parker County in the spring of 1889. He was hired as principal by the school's new president, David Switzer, who had previously been president of Granbury College until it was closed down and he was transferred to Weatherford. In 1890, after having attended a summer course at Eastman Business College in Poughkeepsie, New York, Lomax returned to Texas where he became head of the Business Department of Weatherford College. Each summer, between 1891 and 1894, he also attended the annual lecture-and-concert series at New York State's Chautauqua Institute, which pioneered adult education (and where Lomax himself would later lecture). According to Porterfield, "There he improved his mathematics, struggled with Latin, listened to music that stirred him (opera and oratorios, light 'classics' of the day), and learned, for the first time, of two poets—Tennyson and Browning—whose work would soon become an integral part of his intellectual equipment."

== Early career ==
Lomax decided to further his education at a first-rate university. His first choice was Vanderbilt University in Nashville, Tennessee, but he realized he would likely fail its tough entrance examinations. So, in 1895, at the age of 28, Lomax matriculated at the University of Texas at Austin, majoring in English literature, and undertaking almost a double course load (including Ancient Greek, Latin, and Anglo Saxon) and was graduated in two years. With a touch of Texas hyperbole, he later wrote:

Never was there such a hopeless hodge-podge, There was I, a Chautauqua-educated country boy who couldn't conjugate an English verb or decline a pronoun, attempting to master three other languages at the same time. ... But I plunged on through the year, for since I was older than the average freshman, I must hurry, hurry, hurry. I don't think I ever stopped to think how foolish it all was.

"Cotton-Eyed Joe", performed by John and Ruby Lomax (1939).

In his memoir, Adventures of a Ballad Hunter, Lomax recounts how he had arrived at the University of Texas with a roll of cowboy songs he had written down in childhood. He showed them to an English professor, Morgan Callaway, only to have them discounted as "cheap and unworthy," prompting Lomax to take the bundle behind the men's dormitory and burn it. His interest in folksongs thus rebuffed, Lomax focused his attentions on more acceptable academic pursuits. He joined the fraternity Phi Delta Theta and the Rusk Literary Society, as well as becoming an editor and later the editor-in-chief of the University of Texas Magazine. During the summer of 1896, he attended a summer school program in Chicago studying languages. In 1897, he became an associate editor of the Alcalde, a student newspaper. After graduation in June 1897, he worked at the University of Texas as registrar for the next six years until the spring of 1903. He also had other duties such as being personal secretary to the president of the university, manager of Brackenridge Hall (the men's dormitory on campus), and serving on the Alumni Scholarship Committee. Lomax joined a campus fraternity known as The Great and Honorable Order of Gooroos receiving the title "Sybillene Priest".

Sometime around July 1898 Lomax began an intense relationship with Shirley Green of Palestine, Texas, to whom he had been introduced in 1897 by the president of the University of Texas. For four years, their friendship had its ups and downs, until June 1902, when Lomax met one of Green's acquaintances, Bess Baumann Brown from Dallas. It ultimately emerged that the reason for Green's reluctance to commit herself to an engagement to John Lomax had been her awareness that she was mortally ill with tuberculosis. However, Lomax continued to exchange letters with Green until a month before her death, which occurred in February 1903. That year, Lomax accepted an offer to teach English at Texas A&M University beginning in September To bolster his credentials, in the meantime, he decided to enroll at the University of Chicago for a summer course. Upon his return to Texas he became engaged to Bess Brown and they married on June 9, 1904, in Austin. The couple settled down at College Station near the A&M campus. Their first child, Shirley, was born on August 7, 1905.

Lomax, aware of the deficiencies of his early education, still wished to improve himself, however, and on September 26, 1906, he jumped at the chance to attend Harvard University in Cambridge, Massachusetts, as a graduate student, having previously received a $500 stipend: The Austin Teaching Fellowships. Here he had the opportunity to study under Barrett Wendell and George Lyman Kittredge, two renowned scholars who actively encouraged his interest in cowboy songs. Harvard, in fact, was the center of American folklore studies (then viewed as a subsidiary of English literature, itself a novel field of scholarship in comparison with the more traditional study of rhetoric focused on classical languages and geared to preparing lawyers and clergy). Kittredge, in addition to being a well-known scholar of Chaucer and Shakespeare, had inherited the professorship in English literature previously held by Francis James Child, whose courses he continued to teach and whose great, unfinished eight-volume edition of the Popular Ballads of England and Scotland he brought to completion.

It was Kittredge who pioneered modern methods of ballad study, and who encouraged collectors to get out of their armchairs and library halls and to get out into the countryside to collect ballads first hand. When he met John Lomax in 1907, this was what he encouraged him to do; the cowboy songs Lomax had been writing down were glimpses into a whole new world, and Lomax should follow up on his work. "Go and get this material while it can be found," he told the young Texan. "Preserve the words and music. That's your job."

Wendell and Kittredge continued to play an important advisory role in Lomax's career after he returned to Texas in June 1907 to resume his teaching position at A&M after completing his Master of Arts degree. This included a visit by the two professors to Texas during which Lomax took them to a Sunday service in an African-American church.

Soon after his return to Austin, John Lomax's son, John Jr., was born, on June 14, 1907. Galvanized by Kittredge's advice and support, Lomax had begun collecting cowboy songs and ballads, but his work was interrupted on February 7, 1908, when "The Great A&M Strike" broke out. The strike, caused by student dissatisfaction with the administration, continued even after February 14, 1908, when the university, in a conciliatory gesture, fired some of its administrators. Unable to teach because of the strike, Lomax decided to see about resuming his collecting of cowboy ballads with a view to publishing them in a book. Encouraged by Wendell, he applied for and was awarded a Sheldon Fellowship grant. In June 1908, Lomax became a full professor at A&M. That August the strike ended when the president of the university resigned. In June 1910, Lomax accepted an administrative job at the University of Texas as "Secretary of the University Faculties and Assistant Director of the Department of Extension."

In November 1910 the anthology, Cowboy Songs and Other Frontier Ballads, was published by Sturgis and Walton, with an introduction by former president Theodore Roosevelt. Among the songs included were "Jesse James", "The Old Chisholm Trail", "Sweet Betsy From Pike", and "The Buffalo Skinners" (which George Lyman Kittredge considered "one of the greatest western ballads" and which was praised for its Homeric quality by Carl Sandburg and Virgil Thomson.) From the first, John Lomax insisted on the inclusiveness of American culture. Some of the most famous songs in the book — "Git Along Little Dogies", "Sam Bass," and "Home on the Range" — were sourced from African-American cowboys. Before Home on the Range was published Lomax recorded a black saloon keeper in San Antonio singing it on an Edison cylinder.

Cowboy Songs and Other Frontier Ballads emerged as a major collection of Western songs and had "a profound effect on other folk song students.". According to noted folklore scholar, D. K. Wilgus, the book's publication "sparked a great surge of interest in folk songs of all kinds, and in fact, inspired a search for folk material in all regions of the nation." Its success transformed John A. Lomax into a nationally known figure.

== Texas Folklore Society ==
Around the same time, Lomax and Professor Leonidas Payne of the University of Texas at Austin co-founded the Texas Folklore Society, following Kittredge's suggestion that Lomax establish a Texas branch of the American Folklore Society. Lomax and Payne hoped that the society would further their own research while kindling an interest in folklore among like-minded Texans. On Thanksgiving Day, 1909, Lomax nominated Payne as president of the society, and Payne nominated Lomax as first secretary. The two set out to marshal support, and a month later, Killis Campbell, an associate professor at the university, publicly proposed the formation of the society at a meeting of the Texas State Teachers Association in Dallas. By April 1910, there were 92 charter members.

Lomax then used his prestige as a nationally known author to travel the country raising money for folklore studies and to establish other state folklore societies. "He was among the first scholars to present papers about American folk songs to the Modern Language Association, the nation's leading organization of teachers of languages and literature. For the next several years he hit the lecture circuit, traveling so often that his wife, Bess Brown, had to help him with his schedules and even some of his speeches." His lectures on cowboy songs, ballads and poetry took him all across the eastern USA. For example, in December 1911, Lomax made a successful performance at Cornell University, singing and reciting some of the cowboy songs he had collected. Sometimes he would have a chorus of college students dress up as cowboys to add interest to his presentations.

Lomax's abiding interest in African-American folklore was also in evidence, for he had plans to publish another book within a year that consisted of folk songs collected from African-Americans. Although the book failed to materialize, he did publish (in the Journal of American Folklore, December 1912) "Stories of an African Prince", a collection of 16 African stories, which he had obtained through his correspondence with a young Nigerian student, Lattevi Ajayi. In 1912, with the backing of Kittredge, John A. Lomax was elected president of the American Folklore Society, with Kittredge (himself a former president of the society) as First Vice President. He was re-elected for a second term in 1913. In 1922, J. Frank Dobie became secretary-treasurer of the Texas Folklore Society, a job he was to hold for 21 years.

Lomax's second son (and third child), Alan, was born on January 15, 1915. In time, Alan Lomax would prove a worthy successor of his father. A second daughter, Bess, was born in 1921, and she too had a distinguished career, both as a performer and teacher.

The Texas Folklore Society grew gradually over the next decade, with Lomax steering it forward. At his invitation, Kittredge and Wendell attended its meetings. Other early members were Stith Thompson and J. Frank Dobie, who both began teaching English at the university in 1914. In 1915, at Lomax's recommendation, Stith Thompson became the society's secretary-treasurer. In 1916, Lomax's voluminous encyclopedia, The Book of Texas, which he had written jointly with Harry Yandall Benedict, was published. The same year, Stith Thompson edited the first volume of the Publications of the Texas Folklore Society, which Dobie reissued as Round the Levee in 1935. This publication exemplified the society's express purpose, and the motivation behind Lomax's own work: to gather a body of folklore before it disappeared, and to preserve it for the analysis of later scholars. These early efforts foreshadowed what would become Lomax's greatest achievement, the collection of more than ten thousand recordings for the Archive of American Folk Song at the Library of Congress. In the inaugural issue of the Publications of the Texas Folklore Society, John A. Lomax urged the collection of Texas folklore: "Two rich and practically unworked fields in Texas are found in the large Negro and Mexican populations of the state." He adds, "Here are many problems of research that lie close at hand, not buried in musty tomes and incomplete records, but in vital human personalities."

Throughout the next seven years he continued his research and lecture tours assisted and encouraged by his wife and children. All this came to an end on July 16, 1917, however, when Lomax was fired along with six other faculty members as the result of a political battle between Governor James E. Ferguson and the university's president, R. E. Vinson. Lomax moved to Chicago to take a job selling bonds at Lee, Higginson & Co; a bond brokerage firm run by the son of his old professor Barrett Wendell. A few months later, Ferguson was impeached and the Board of Regents rescinded its dismissal of the faculty. Lomax judged that it would be wrong to leave his post at Lee, Higginson & Co so soon after arriving, especially with regards to his friendship with the family of Barrett Wendell, so he remained in Chicago for eighteen months until the war ended. There he struck up a what turned out to be a lifelong friendship with Chicago poet Carl Sandburg, who frequently mentions him in his book, American Songbag (1927). In 1919, his next book, Songs of the Cattle Trail and Cow Camp, an anthology of cowboy poetry, was published by Macmillan. That year Lomax returned to Texas to be secretary of the Texas Exes, which had become financially independent of the university, so as to avoid further interference from politicians. Nevertheless, interference struck, when Ferguson, whom the law prohibited from holding office, ran his wife, Miriam A. Ferguson, as his surrogate. As governor, Mrs. Ferguson was able to pack the board of regents and oust John from his job as editor of The Alcade, which during his tenure was a 100-page long publication. Seeing how the wind was blowing, Lomax resigned his secretaryship and joined the Republic Bank of Dallas in 1925. The economic crash of 1929 presaged bad things for the bank, however.

== Archive of American Folk Song ==
In 1931, Lomax's wife Bess Brown died at the age of 50, leaving four children (the youngest, Bess, was ten years old). In addition, the Dallas bank at which Lomax worked failed: he had to phone his customers one by one to announce that their investments were all worthless. In debt and unemployed and with two school-age children to support, the sixty-five-year-old went into a deep depression. In hope of reviving his father's spirits, his oldest son, John Lomax Jr. encouraged him to begin a new series of lecture tours. They took to the road, camping out by the side of the road to save money, with John Jr. (and later Alan Lomax) serving the senior Lomax as driver and personal assistant. In June 1932, they arrived at the offices of the Macmillan publishing company in New York City. Here Lomax proposed his idea for an anthology of American ballads and folksongs, with a special emphasis on the contributions of African Americans. It was accepted. In preparation he traveled to Washington to review the holdings in the Archive of American Folk Song of the Library of Congress.

By the time of Lomax's arrival, the archive already contained a collection of commercial phonograph recordings that straddled the boundaries between commercial and folk, and wax cylinder field recordings, built up under the leadership of Robert Winslow Gordon, head of the archive, and Carl Engel, chief of the Music Division. Gordon had also experimented in the field with a portable disc recorder, but had had neither time nor resources to do significant fieldwork. Lomax found the recorded holdings of the archive woefully inadequate for his purposes. He therefore made an arrangement with the library whereby it would provide recording equipment, obtained for it by Lomax through private grants, in exchange for which he would travel the country making field recordings to be deposited in the archive of the library, then the major resource for printed and recorded material in the United States

After the departure of Robert Gordon from the library in 1934, John A. Lomax was named Honorary Consultant and Curator of the Archive of American Folk Song, a title he held until his death in 1948. His work, for which he was paid a salary of one dollar, included fund raising for the library, and he was expected to support himself entirely through writing books and giving lectures. Lomax secured grants from the Carnegie Corporation and the Rockefeller Foundation, among others, for continued field recordings. He and Alan recorded Spanish ballads and vaquero songs on the Rio Grande border and spent weeks among French-speaking Cajuns in southern Louisiana.

Thus began a ten-year relationship with the Library of Congress that would involve not only John but the entire Lomax family, including his second wife, Ruby Terrill Lomax, Professor of Classics and Dean of Women at the University of Texas, whom he married in 1934. His sons and daughters assisted with his folksong research and with the daily operations of the archive: Shirley, who performed songs taught to her by her mother; John Jr., who encouraged his father's association with the library; Alan Lomax who accompanied John on field trips and who from 1937 to 1942 served as the archive's first paid (though very nominally) employee as Assistant in Charge; and Bess, who spent her weekends and school vacations copying song texts and doing comparative song research.

== Field recordings ==
Through a grant from the American Council of Learned Societies, Lomax was able to set out in June 1933 on the first recording expedition under the library's auspices, with Alan Lomax (then eighteen years old) in tow. As now, a disproportionate percentage of African American males were held as prisoners. Robert Winslow Gordon, Lomax's predecessor at the Library of Congress, had written (in an article in The New York Times, c. 1926) that, "Nearly every type of song is to be found in our prisons and penitentiaries" Folklorists Howard Odum and Guy Johnson also had observed that, "If one wishes to obtain anything like an accurate picture of the workaday Negro he will surely find his best setting in the chain gang, prison, or in the situation of the ever-fleeing fugitive." But what these folklorists had merely recommended John and Alan Lomax were able to put into practice. In their successful grant application they wrote, following Odum, Johnson and Gordon's hint, that prisoners, "Thrown on their own resources for entertainment ... still sing, especially the long-term prisoners who have been confined for years and who have not yet been influenced by jazz and the radio, the distinctive old-time Negro melodies." They toured Texas prison farms recording work songs, reels, ballads, and blues from prisoners such as James "Iron Head" Baker, Mose "Clear Rock" Platt, and Lightnin' Washington. By no means were all of those whom the Lomaxes recorded imprisoned, however: in other communities, they recorded K.C. Gallaway and Henry Truvillion.

In July 1933, they acquired a state-of-the-art, 315-pound (143 kg) phonograph recorder that used uncoated aluminum discs. Installing it in the trunk of his Ford sedan, Lomax soon used it to record, at the Louisiana State Penitentiary at Angola, a twelve-string guitar player by the name of Huddie Ledbetter, better known as "Lead Belly," whom they considered one of their most significant finds. During the next year and a half, father and son continued to make disc recordings of musicians throughout the South.

In contrast to earlier amateur collectors, the Lomaxes were also among the first to attempt to apply scholarly methodology in their work, though they did not adhere to the strict empirical positivism adopted by the subsequent generation of academic folklorists, who believed in refraining from drawing conclusions about the data they amassed.

The following year (in July 1934), they visited Angola once again. This time Lead Belly begged them to make a recording of a song he had written to take to the governor requesting parole, which they did. However, unbeknownst to them, Lead Belly was released in August for good time (and because of cost-cutting due to the Depression) and not because of the Lomaxes' recording, which the governor may not have listened to. In September 1934, Lead Belly wrote to Lomax requesting employment, since he needed to have a job in order not to be sent back to prison. At the urging of John Jr., Lomax engaged Lead Belly as his driver and assistant, and the pair traveled the South together collecting folk songs for the next three months. Then, in December 1934, Lead Belly famously performed illustrating John Lomax's scheduled lecture of folk songs at a smoker and sing-along held at the national MLA meeting in Philadelphia (see Lead Belly). Their association continued for three more months until the following March (1935). In January, Lomax, who knew nothing whatever about the recording business, became Lead Belly's manager and, through a friend, cowboy singer Tex Ritter, got Lead Belly a recording contract with the famous A&R man Art Satherley of ARC records. Satherly had publicity photos made of the singer wearing overalls and sitting on sacks of grain, garb and setting that were customary in commercial publicity photos of country singers in those days. But Lead Belly's recordings, marketed as race music, failed to sell. A filmed re-enactment in early 1935 for The March of Time newsreel of Lomax's discovery of Lead Belly in prison, led to the myth that John Lomax made Lead Belly perform in prison stripes (which is inaccurate). He did perform in overalls, however. During Lomax's two-week lecture tour with Lead Belly on the eastern college circuit in March 1935 (pre-scheduled by Lomax before teaming up with Lead Belly), the two men quarreled over money and never spoke to one another again.

John A. Lomax has been accused of paternalism and of tailoring Lead Belly's repertoire and clothing during his brief association with Lead Belly. "But," writes jazz historian Ted Gioia,

few would deny the instrumental role he played in the transformation of the one-time convict into a commercially successful performer of traditional African American music. The turnabout in his life was rapid and profound: Lead Belly was released from prison on August 1, 1934; his schedule for the last week of December that year included performances for the MLA gathering in Philadelphia, for an afternoon tea in Bryn Mawr, and for an informal gathering of professors from Columbia and NYU. Even by the standards of the entertainment industry ... this was a remarkable transformation.

After his three-months as a performer illustrating John A. Lomax's lectures, Lead Belly went on to a 15-year career as an independent artist, championed and assisted intermittently (but not managed) by Alan Lomax.

In 1938 John Lomax visited noted writer Ben Robertson in Pickens County, South Carolina, where Robertson introduced him to the all-day singing festivals of the area which enabled Lomax to preserve the lyrics of many local folk songs.

== The scope of the collection ==
The Archive of American Folk Song of the Library of Congress contains songs collected in 33 states of the Union and certain parts of the West Indies, The Bahamas, and Haiti. As Curator and Assistant in Charge of the Folk Song Collection John and Alan Lomax supervised and worked with many other folklorists, musicologists, and composers, amateur and professional, all over the country, amassing more than ten thousand records of vocal and instrumental music on aluminum and acetate discs along with many pages of written documentation.

In his 1942 introduction to the multi-volume Checklist of Recorded Folk Song in the Library of Congress, Harold Spivacke, Chief of the Library of Congress's Division of Music, wrote:

Many hard-working and expert folklorists cooperated in the accumulation of this material, but in the main the development of the Archive of American Folk Song represents the work of two men, John and Alan Lomax. Starting in 1933, the Lomaxes, father and son, traveled tens of thousands of miles, endured many hardships, exercised great patience and tact to win the confidence and friendship of hundreds of singers in order to bring to the Library of Congress records of the voices of countless interesting people they met on the way. Very much remains to be done to make our Archive truly representative of all the people, but the country owes a debt of gratitude to these two men for the excellent foundation laid for future work in this field. ... The Lomaxes received much help in their expeditions from many interested folklorists, some of whom have made important contributions to the Archive as a result of independent expeditions of their own. To these the Library wishes to take this opportunity to express its deep gratitude. They include Gordon Barnes, Mary E. Barnicle, E. C. Beals, Barbara Bell, Paul Brewster, Genevieve Chandler, Richard Chase, Fletcher Collins, Carita D. Corse, Sidney Robertson Cowell, Dr. E. K. Davis, Kay Dealy, Seamus Doyle, Charles Draves, Marjorie Edgar, John Henry Faulk, Richard Fento, Helen Hartness Flanders, Frank Goodwin, Percy Grainger, Herbert Halpert, Melville Herskovits, Zora Neale Hurston, Myra Hull, George Pullen Jackson, Stetson Kennedy, Bess Lomax, Elizabeth Lomax, Ruby Terrill Lomax, Eloise Linscott, Bascom Lamar Lunsford, Walter McClintock, Alton Morris, Juan B. Rael, Vance Randolph, Helen Roberts, Domingo Santa Cruz, Charles Seeger, Mrs. Nicol Smith, Robert Sonkin, Ruby Pickens Tartt, Jean Thomas, Charles Todd, Margaret Valliant, Ivan Walton, Irene Whitfield, John Woods, and John W. Work III.

This checklist has been prepared as a result of countless requests. ... Its appearance at this time is indeed appropriate since it is natural for a nation at war to try to evaluate and exploit to the fullest its own cultural heritage. In our folk song may be found some of the profoundedst currents that have run through American history. A mere glance at the titles listed here will be sufficient to show the variety and complexity of the democratic life of our country.

After 1942, field work of collecting folk songs under government auspices was discontinued due to a shortage of acetate needed for the war effort. But the work had aroused the ire and suspicion of Southern conservatives in Congress who were fearful it could be used as a cover for civil and worker rights agitation, and because of congressional opposition it has never been resumed.

== Legacy ==
John A. Lomax's contribution to the documentation of American folk traditions extended beyond the Library of Congress Music Division through his involvement with two agencies of the Works Progress Administration. In 1936, he was assigned to serve as an advisor on folklore collecting for both the Historical Records Survey and the Federal Writers' Project. Lomax's biographer, Nolan Porterfield, notes that the outlines of the famed WPA State Guides resulting from this work resemble Lomax and Benedict's earlier Book of Texas.

As the Federal Writers' Project's first Folklore Editor, Lomax also directed the gathering of ex-slave narratives and devised a questionnaire for project fieldworkers to use.

The WPA project to interview former slaves assumed a form and a scope that bore Lomax's imprint and reflected his experience and zeal as a collector of folklore. His sense of urgency inspired the efforts in several states. And his prestige and personal influence enlisted the support of many project officials, particularly in the deep South, who might otherwise have been unresponsive to requests for materials of this type. One might question the wisdom of selecting Lomax, a white Southerner to direct a project involving the collection of data from black former slaves. Yet whatever racial preconceptions Lomax may have held do not appear to have had an appreciable effect upon the Slave Narrative Collection. Lomax's instructions to interviewers emphasized the necessity of obtaining a faithful account of the ex-slave's version of his or her experience. "It should be remembered that the Federal Writers' Project is not interested in taking sides on any question. The worker should not censor any materials collected regardless of its nature." Lomax constantly reiterated his insistence that the interviews be recorded verbatim, with no holds barred. In his editorial capacity he closely adhered to this dictum.

Upon Lomax's departure this work was continued by Benjamin A. Botkin, who succeeded Lomax as the project's folklore editor in 1938, and at the library in 1939, resulting in the invaluable compendium of authentic slave narratives: Lay My Burden Down: A Folk History of Slavery, edited by B. A. Botkin (Chicago: University of Chicago Press, 1945).

John A. Lomax served as president of the Texas Folklore Society for the years 1940–41, and 1941–42. In 1947 his autobiography Adventures of a Ballad Hunter (New York: Macmillan) was published and was awarded the Carr P. Collins prize as the best book of the year by the Texas Institute of Letters. The book was immediately optioned to be made into a Hollywood movie starring Bing Crosby as Lomax and Josh White as Lead Belly, but the project was never realized.

In 1932, Lomax met his friend, Henry Zweifel, a rancher and businessman then from Cleburne in Johnson County, while both were volunteers for Orville Bullington's Republican gubernatorial race against the Democrat Miriam Ferguson. Lomax's old enemy, James Ferguson, was virtually running his wife's comeback attempt at the governorship.

Lomax died of a stroke at the age of eighty in January 1948. On June 15 of that year, Lead Belly gave a concert at the University of Texas, performing children's songs such as "Skip to My Lou" and spirituals (performed with his wife Martha) that he had first sung years before for the late collector.

In 2010, John A. Lomax was inducted into the Western Music Hall of Fame for his contributions to the field of cowboy music.

Following in his grandfather's footsteps, Lomax's grandson John Lomax III is a nationally published United States music journalist, author of Nashville: Music City USA (1986), Red Desert Sky (2001) and co-author of The Country Music Book (1988). He is also an artist manager and has represented Townes Van Zandt, Steve Earle, Rocky Hill, David Schnaufer and The Cactus Brothers. He began representing the Dead Ringer Band in 1996. John Lomax III was also a music writer for Houston's early-1970s underground newspaper, Space City!
