= Bill Minutaglio =

American journalist

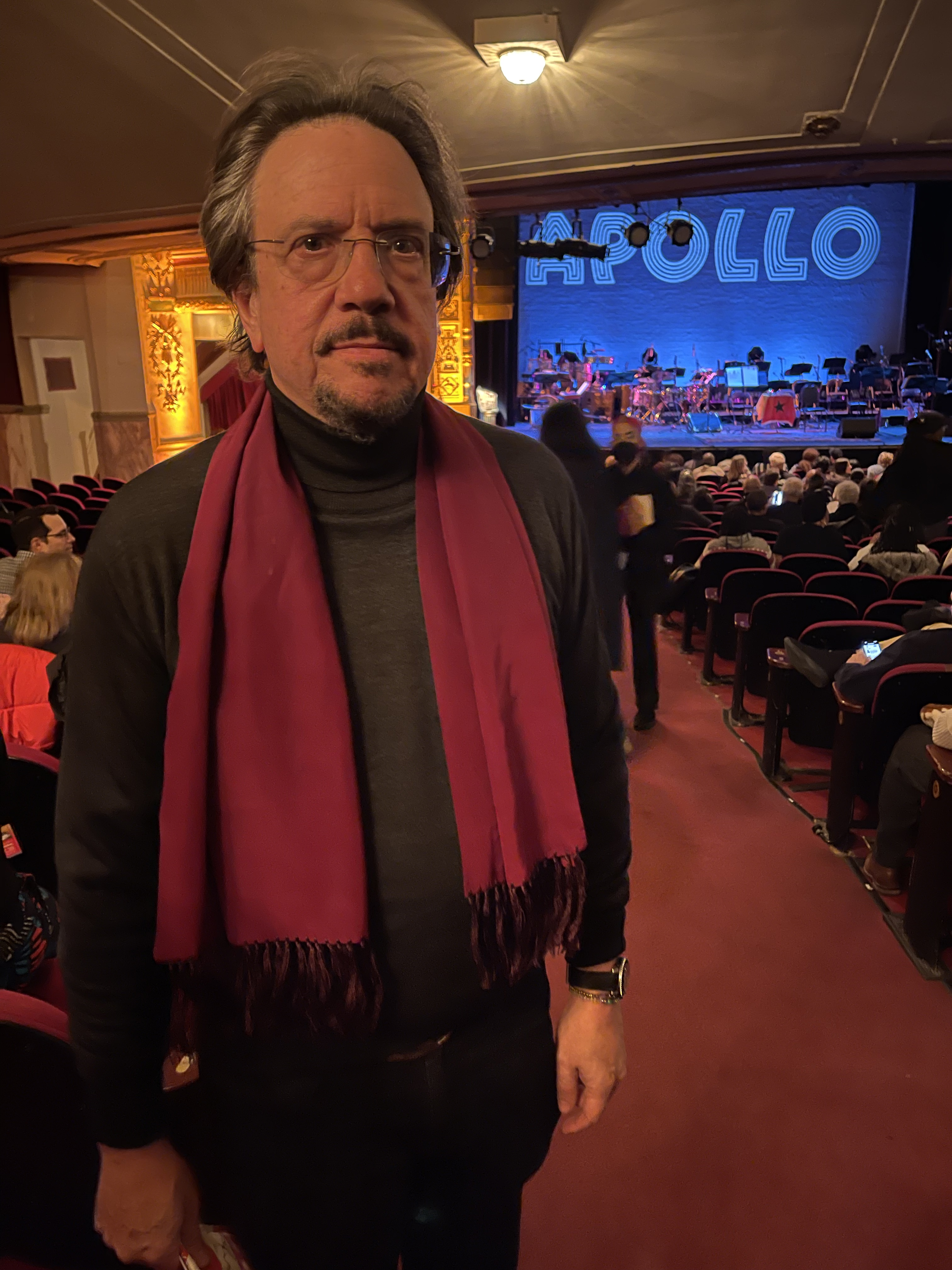
- Minutaglio in 2023
- Born: William Donald Minutaglio; 1955 (age 70–71); Brooklyn, New York, U.S.
- Education: Columbia University (BA, MA)
- Occupations: Journalist; educator; author

Bill Minutaglio (né William Donald Minutaglio; born 1955) is a journalist, educator and author of nine books. He is the recipient of a PEN Center USA Literary Award and has served as a professor at The University of Texas at Austin, where he was given The Regents' Outstanding Teaching Award.

== Career ==
His book Dallas 1963 (co-written with Steven L. Davis) won the PEN award and was named among the best books of the year by The Washington Post's "The Fix," The New Republic, Kirkus Reviews, The Seattle Times, The Kansas City Star, The Oklahoman and other places.

The Daily Beast said his book Dallas 1963 (co-written with Steven L. Davis) was one of the five most important books written about the death of President John F. Kennedy, along with works by Norman Mailer, Don DeLillo and others.

His book The Most Dangerous Man in America: Timothy Leary, Richard Nixon and the Hunt for the Fugitive King of LSD (co-written with Steven L. Davis) was named a National Public Radio Book of the Year and was optioned by the film company that co-produced Steven Spielberg's movie The Post.

His book City on Fire: The Explosion That Devastated a Texas Town and Ignited a Historic Legal Battle was optioned by Tom Cruise and Paramount Pictures. City on Fire was named by Esquire magazine as one of the greatest stories of human survival, along with works by Ernest Hemingway and others.

His book First Son: George W. Bush & The Bush Family Dynasty, was the first biography written about President Bush. Director Oliver Stone cited the book in interviews about Stone’s movie W..

Based in Texas, Minutaglio's books and journalism often center on race and social inequities. The Austin American-Statesman said he ″has long been regarded as one of the great writers in Texas … Minutaglio wrote exquisite long-form pieces about Texas poverty in a time of plenty.″

Inducted into The Texas Institute of Letters, his work has appeared in The New York Times, The Guardian,Newsweek, The Washington Post, Los Angeles Times, Bulletin of the Atomic Scientists, Scotland on Sunday, Outside, Esquire, The New Republic and other places.

His other books are: In Search of the Blues: A Journey to the Soul of Black Texas; Molly Ivins: A Rebel Life; The President’s Counselor: The Rise to Power of Alberto Gonzales; Locker Room Mojo; The Hidden City.

== Personal life ==
Minutaglio's father was a printer educated in Naples, Italy. His mother was adopted from a New York City "foundling's home” by an Italian immigrant family. Minutaglio was born in Brooklyn and is the youngest of five brothers (his oldest brother was working in the World Trade Center the day it was destroyed; he survived the attack).

He attended Catholic schools and earned an undergraduate degree in history and Asian studies from Columbia University. He studied for one year at the Columbia University Graduate School of International Affairs, and graduated with a master's degree from the Columbia University Graduate School of Journalism. While a student, he worked at the United Nations in New York as an intern in the Center for Economic and Social Information. Also while a student, he worked for the United States Department of Agriculture administering "free food" programs for children in Harlem and the South Bronx.

He is married to Holly Williams, former member of the Mark Morris, Jose Limon and Laura Dean dance companies. She is a Professor and was the senior associate dean of the College of Fine Arts at the University of Texas at Austin. His daughter Rose is a journalist who writes for Esquire, Elle and other publications. His son Nicholas is the recording artist/producer known as dazy.

== Career ==
In 1978, Minutaglio became a police reporter and columnist at the Abilene Reporter-News in Texas. He then worked as a writer, editor and columnist at the three largest Texas newspapers – The Dallas Morning News, Houston Chronicle and San Antonio Express-News.

He covered regional, national and international events and issues, including strife in the Philippines, East and West Germany, the Soviet Union, Nicaragua, El Salvador, Honduras, and Mexico. He interviewed Allen Ginsberg, Timothy Leary, Hillary Clinton, Arnold Schwarzenegger, John Belushi, Ray Charles, Willie Nelson.

In the 1990s, he began writing for national magazines and was hired by editor Tina Brown as a contributing writer for TALK. He was a national writer for Sporting News, where he profiled Larry Bird and others. Random House editor Jon Karp asked him to write the first independent biography of George W. Bush, eventually published under the Times Books imprint. In 2002, he became a regional bureau chief for People, overseeing correspondents around the United States and Mexico, as well as the magazine’s coverage of Hurricane Katrina. "For handling the Katrina disaster more deftly than the government,” Advertising Age named People the 2005 Magazine of the Year.

Minutaglio wrote the first magazine stories about The Dallas Buyers Club. He was interviewed by United States and international news outlets, including CNN, about his work and the movie made about the club. His work also appeared in The Daily Beast, Politico, Men’s Health, Mexico Business, Details and Texas Monthly. He was a columnist for several years with The Texas Observer and is a contributing writer at that publication.

He has spoken at The Jimmy Carter Library & Museum, Northwestern University, the University of Virginia and Johns Hopkins University. He joined the faculty as a Clinical Professor at the University of Texas at Austin in 2007. He was given The Regents Outstanding Teaching Award by the statewide university system before retiring in 2018.

He appeared on Today, Nightline, NPR, BBC, CNN, MSNBC, Fox News, C-SPAN and PBS. He has been interviewed by Katie Couric, Dan Rather, Peter Jennings, Tom Brokaw, Brian Williams, Terry Gross, Charlie Rose and others.

He co-wrote the documentary film Cactus Jack: Lone Star on Capitol Hill which was broadcast nationally on many PBS stations.

His writing is included in these anthologies: Merchants of Misery: How Corporate America Profits from Poverty; Literary Austin; Echoes of Texas Football: The Greatest Stories Ever Told; Men and Masculinity. Excerpts from his books have appeared in many publications.

== Critical reaction ==
The writers Mario Puzo, Buzz Bissinger, Sir Harold Evans, Gail Sheehy, Douglas Brinkley, James Lee Burke and others have written "advance praise" for his books. In reviews and columns, The New York Times has called his work "authoritative" and "fascinating." The New York Review of Books said it was "excellent.” Other reviews have compared his work to that of Tom Wolfe, Herman Melville and Hunter Thompson.

He has received awards from the National Association of Black Journalists, the National Conference of Christians and Jews, University of Missouri, National Headliners, Texas Headliners, Writers' League of Texas, Association for Women in Communications and other places. His work has been listed in several editions of The Best American Sports writing. A newspaper column he did for The Dallas Morning News was named the best in the state by the Dallas Press Club.
