= Robert Cunningham Humphreys =

Robert Cunninghan Humphreys (July 30, 1905 - October 15, 1965) was born in Greenville, Ohio. He was a student at Columbia University from 1926 to 1927.

In 1926, Humphreys was appointed deputy attorney general for the state of New York during the 1926 election when voting machines were used for the first time

Humphreys' early political experience came as publicity director for the Indiana Republican State Committee in the elections of 1932 and 1934. In 1933 Humphreys joined the staff of International News Service (INS) as a political writer, eventually becoming the bureau manager of the Kansas City office. For the 1936 election year, he was assigned by INS to Topeka, Kansas and the Alf Landon presidential campaign. During the time that Humphreys traveled with Landon's campaign train the two men developed a close relationship which was to last until the time of Humphreys' death.

== INS Chief ==
For the years 1937 through 1944, Humphreys transferred to the INS Washington, D.C. branch, becoming chief of the INS congressional staff and the Washington News editor. During this time, while writing a daily column called "Washington-Up-To-The-Minute," Humphreys established close contacts with many members of Congress. He left INS and Washington in 1944 to become the national affairs editor of Newsweek Magazine. However, following the 1948 campaign and the resulting election of Democratic majorities in both houses of Congress, Humphreys was asked by Speaker of the House Joe Martin to return to Washington to establish and direct a public relations office for the Republican Congressional Committee. From this office, Humphreys introduced a variety of visual aid techniques, including television "spots" and 16mm films, in and effort to publicize individual GOP congressmen and to attempt to rid the Republican party of "the depressive atmospheric condition" in America linking Republicans "with the vested interest" and disassociating them "from the ordinary human beings."

In July 1952, Republican National Chairman Arthur Summerfield arranged for the "loan" of Humphreys to the RNC to serve as publicity director for the duration of the 1952 campaign. For this campaign Humphreys designed a blueprint, known as "Document X," which "marked the first time a presidential campaign was planned and put on paper to the last detail." The campaign plan, which covered the who, when, where, and what to do/say for the Eisenhower-Nixon ticket, was, according to Humphreys, followed throughout the campaign "with only a few adjustments to meet political circumstances as they arose." In addition to being prominent in the initial campaign strategy, Humphreys was also instrumental, along with Summerfield, in keeping Nixon on the Republican ticket following the "expense Fund" affair.

== RNC Campaign Director ==
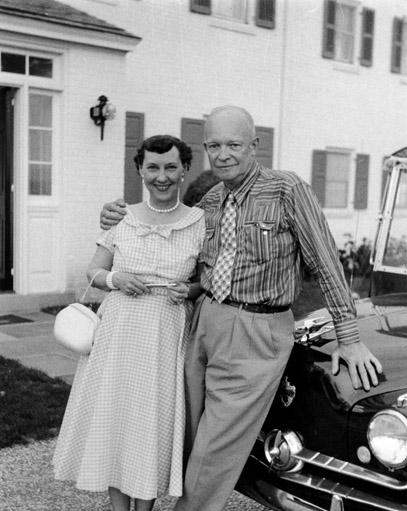
The 35th wedding anniversary of President Eisenhower and his wife, taken in 1955. It was Humphreys job to promote Eisenhower to the public

Following the Republican victories, Humphreys did not return to the Congressional Committee, but stayed with RNC to become campaign director, a position he held from 1954 until 1960. These years involved the organization of the Republican party nationally, regional planning conferences, strategy development, RNC meetings, analyses of elections and polls, campaign tours, two RNC campaign schools (1955 and 1958), speeches, appearances, and another Dwight D. Eisenhower-Richard Nixon campaign. For the 1956 election Humphreys devised a second original campaign plan, and was also involved in halting the "dump Nixon" movement before the RNC convention.

== Always Attack ==
Throughout the Eisenhower years in the White House, Humphreys strived to improve the public relations of the president and his administration. It was his belief that the basic strategy in politics should always be to attack. In a 1953 memo to Leonard Hall, Humphreys stated that "it would be a political mistake for this administration to rely solely on its achievements"; instead "political warfare must be waged by selling our philosophy, our achievements, our kind of government against the alternative."

At the close of the administration, in 1960, President Eisenhower appointed Humphreys to head the staff of the newly formed National Cultural Center project. Humphreys had a lifelong interest in the performing arts, especially classical music. At one period in his career, while working for INS, he wrote a column which reviewed the latest classical albums and he personally owned all the technically advanced equipment in sound recording. Humphreys remained with the ambitious Cultural Center project for a single year until the fund-raising machinery bogged down and came to a complete standstill.

== The Republican Coordinating Committee ==
In 1961 Humphreys turned once again to politics and the Republican party, this time to serve as staff director and consultant for the Joint Senate and House Republican Leadership. From this position Humphreys continued his efforts to improve the public relations of Republican members of Congress. He arranged to make wide political use of the popular Republican ex-president by holding highly publicized meetings at Gettysburg with Eisenhower and such GOP stalwarts as Everett Dirksen and Charles Halleck. Another innovation was what came to be called "The Ev and Charlie Show" in which the two Republican congressional leaders appeared weekly on television to advertise the Republican stand on national issues and to discredit the Kennedy administration. Humphreys was involved in writing the scripts for these press conferences. One of Humphreys' last contributions was the creation of the Republican Coordinating Committee which was designed to broaden the advisory base on national party policy, to establish task forces to deal with national problems, and to stimulate communication and a common approach among party members. The Committee was formed in March 1965, just a few months before Humphreys' death.

Throughout his years with various news organizations and with the RNC, Humphreys produced a number of published articles on a wide variety of politically related topics and personalities. He also contributed chapters to two books on politics, wrote numerous unpublished reports and studies for the Republicans, created scripts for various political slide and movie productions, and occasionally drafted speeches for such high-ranking political figures as James Farley, Alf Landon, Leonard W. Hall, Arthur Summerfield, and Dwight D. Eisenhower.

== See also ==
- Politics of the United States
