= Houston Lost and Unbuilt =

Book by Steven Strom

- Author: Steven Strom
- Language: English
- Genre: Non-fiction
- Publication date: 2010

Houston Lost and Unbuilt is a 2010 non-fiction book by Steven Strom. It documents demolished buildings in Houston as well as ones that were planned but never built.

Craig Hlavaty of the Houston Chronicle wrote that the book "is indispensable for Houstonians who like to think about what was and what might have been." The author argued that the loss of historic buildings in Houston harmed the formation of a community in Houston, and his goal is to promote preservation of historic buildings in Houston. James Wright wrote in Texas Books in Review that the book discusses "the social practices and political mechanisms" resulting in demolition of historic buildings.

== Background ==
Strom, of Swedish ancestry and the holder of a master's degree in history, was a resident of Playa del Rey, California at the time of publication but grew up in Houston and had ancestors who lived in Houston. He was employed by the Houston Metropolitan Research Center of the Houston Public Library as an architectural archivist for a nine-year period. The Journal of Southern History stated that in that capacity Strom "developed extraordinary expertise in Houston's built environment, especially civic and commercial structures." At the time of publication he worked for The Aerospace Corporation.

The author had previously published an article on historic buildings in Houston that had been razed and another article on concepts of buildings never built, also in Houston, published in the same magazine. These articles were the basis of this book.

Lisa Gray of the Houston Chronicle asked Strom if not being resident in Houston at the time of writing the book complicated his research. He replied: "No. Those buildings, they're part of my fabric. They're in my head."

== Contents ==
The buildings that were planned but not constructed were covered in the book's second part.

Wright compared the work to that of Barry Lopez.

== Reception ==
Peter B. Dedek of San Marcos University stated that "Overall, Houston Lost and Unbuilt is an interesting, well researched, and valuable resource for anyone interested in Houston’s history and its lost architectural heritage." Dedek believed that the coverage of projects never built "detracts" from the book's original purpose regarding the promotion of historical preservation.
