= Ruby Terrill Lomax =

American academic administrator and folkloist

"Cotton-Eyed Joe", performed by John and Ruby Lomax (1939).

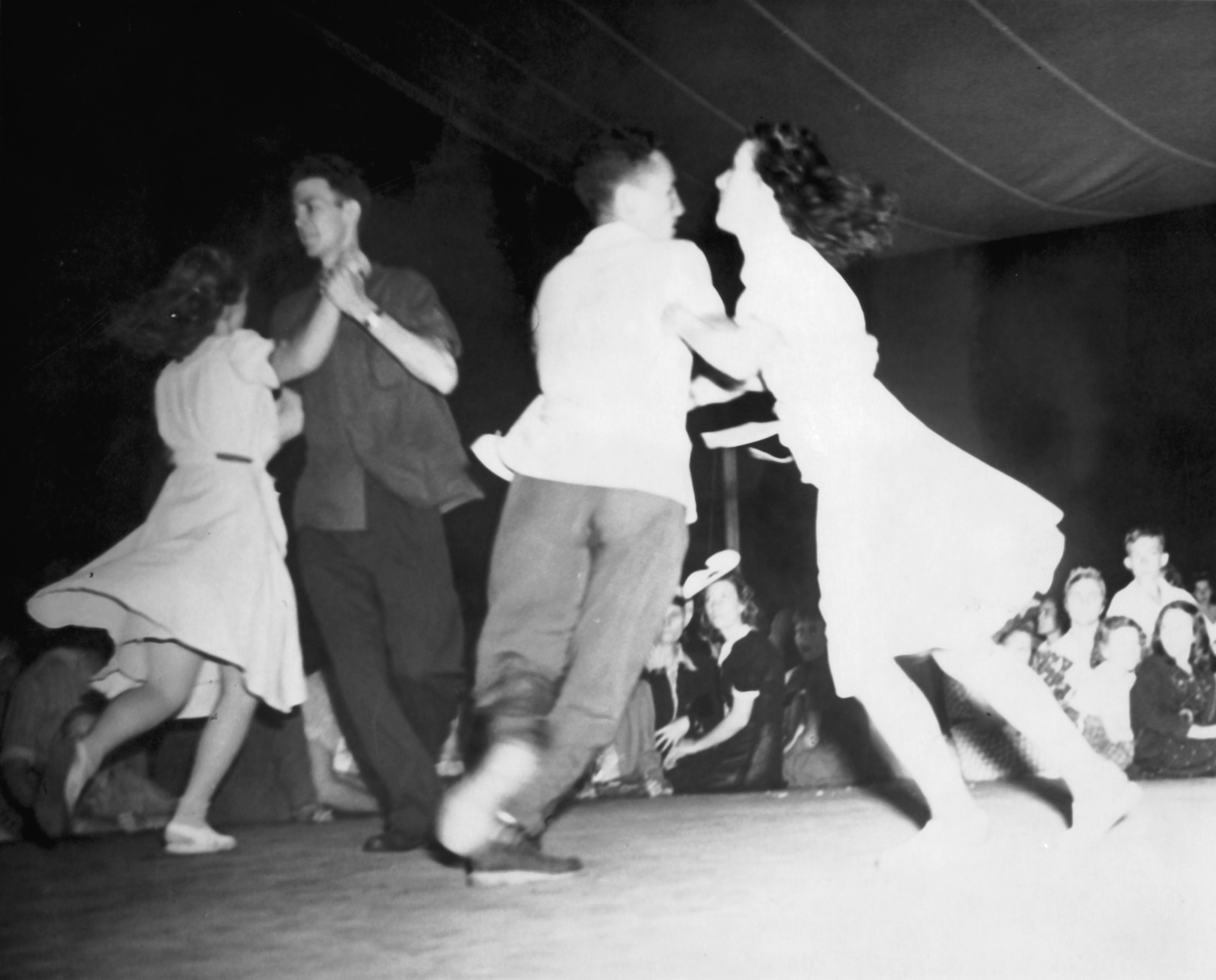
Couples dancing a square dance in Asheville, North Carolina, ca. 1944

Ruby Terrill Lomax (1886 – December 28, 1961) was an American educator, classicist, and folklorist, who worked with her husband John A. Lomax to collect American folk songs, campaigned for women's education, and was Dean of Women at University of Texas at Austin. She was a founder of Delta Kappa Gamma which became an international society for educators.

== Early life ==
Ruby Terrill was born and raised in Denton, Texas, United States, just outside Dallas. She earned degrees at state colleges, setting a record at the University of Texas at Austin for the highest grade average yet achieved by a woman at the university. Recognizing that education was her calling, she taught in rural and urban high schools and colleges in her home state, supporting herself while continuing her own studies. She worked toward a doctorate in classical languages by garnering a fellowship in Latin at the University of Texas for the year 1914–1915 and taking summer courses for four years at the University of Chicago and two years at Columbia University.

== Career ==
In 1925, Terrill received an M.A. in classical languages from Columbia University, with a major in Latin and a minor in Greek, and soon after accepted the position of dean of women and associate professor of classical languages at the University of Texas at Austin. During her tenure at the university, she kept active in a variety of local, national, and international societies. Ever popular with the students and involved with both the faculty and the community, she was renowned for her sense of humor and gentle consideration.

As her education and career indicate, Ruby Terrill was an accomplished and progressive woman in her time. In 1929, she joined with eleven other Texas women educators to found the Delta Kappa Gamma Society International, an honorary society dedicated to advancing the professional interests and position of women in education. She was nominated parliamentarian, guiding the society procedurally for its first four years, and she eventually held a number of other positions, including first vice-president (1933).

The twelve founders risked their hard-earned professional positions to create the society. It was frowned upon by their male and even some of their female colleagues, who felt that women's organizations smacked of suffragism. Ruby Terrill continued to contribute her time, energy, and ideas to Delta Kappa Gamma long after her retirement from the university, and she left a gift to the society in her will. To this day, the boardroom at the society's headquarters in Austin is named the Ruby Terrill Lomax Boardroom.

== Marriage ==
Ruby Terrill became the second Mrs. John A. Lomax in 1934. "Miss Terrill," as John Lomax called her even during their fourteen years of marriage, first met her future husband in 1921. She was dean of women and classical languages instructor at East Texas State Teachers College in Commerce, Texas, when John Lomax gave a lecture on his cowboy song research. After she gave him and his young son Alan a tour of Commerce, he enlisted her as a babysitter.

Over a decade later, the widowed John Lomax met Miss Terrill again, at the University of Texas at Austin. An alumnus and former employee of the university, he was visiting this time in his role as a parent, and she was Alan Lomax's Latin instructor.

== Field recordings ==
Throughout the summer of 1933, while John and Alan Lomax toured the Southern states collecting folksongs, John courted Ruby Terrill by mail, engaging her interest while simultaneously describing to her his life's work. Perhaps she saw an aspect of her passion for the classics in his passion for preserving near-extinguished American folk expressions; perhaps it was their mutual love for Texas that transformed their acquaintance into romance. After receiving the blessing of John Lomax's two adult children, Shirley and John Jr., they announced their engagement at a grand fête in Austin on March 31, 1934. As "an event of statewide interest," it was reported in all of the major Texas newspapers the next day.

John and Ruby Lomax married on July 21, 1934, in Commerce, Texas, the site of their first meeting. They honeymooned in the West, then resettled in Austin, where she resumed her duties at the university and assumed the new duties of parenting the Lomax teenagers, Bess and Alan, who affectionately called their stepmother "Deanie." She managed to teach and administer at the university, remain involved in myriad organizations, oversee the home and family, and take care of a number of duties for her husband's research, while he resumed collecting, lecturing, and meeting with publishers and funders.

In 1937, she exchanged the academic pursuits and frenetic schedule of her life in Austin for the intellectual pursuits and equally frenetic pace of life on the road with a ballad hunter. The Lomaxes moved to the "House in the Woods" outside Dallas as their permanent residence, then drove away in her Plymouth on a scouting tour of the Southern states. It was Ruby Lomax's first trip in the capacity of "chauffeur, valet, buffer, machine operator, disk-jockey, body-guard, doctor and nurse, wife and companion," a role she would reprise on later occasions, including the 1939 Southern States Recording Trip.

Ruby Terrill Lomax's role in the success of the 1939 Southern States Recording Trip cannot be overemphasized. Nearly all written documentation relating to the collection was composed by her. Read her notes on the records’ dust jackets, her transcriptions of song texts, and her fieldnotes. In addition, her voice can be heard on a number of the recordings, carefully announcing the performer's name and the date and location of the recording.

John Lomax's May 12, 1939 letter to Music Division chief Harold Spivacke highlights his wife's volunteer contributions to the Library's Archive of American Folk Song: "In nearly every instance Miss Terrill is including typed copies of the words contained on each record; also the slang of the song and the singers. This will be a big saving for the Library. Writing down the words from the record playing is a long, tedious job." While her husband possessed the contacts, the title of Honorary Consultant and Curator of the Archive of American Folk Song, and the expert knowledge of the material he was seeking and collecting, Ruby Lomax possessed the organizational and archival skills of a longtime administrator and instructor, the wide-eyed wonder of a lifelong learner uncovering a whole new world of studies, and the social skills of a parliamentarian who was a key player on many teams. Her contribution to folksong collection has been considerably overshadowed by John and Alan Lomax, who were the names authors on the book, American Ballads and Folksongs.

== Later life ==
After John Lomax's death in 1948, Ruby Lomax remained at the "House in the Woods" for many years. She died at the age of seventy-five on December 28, 1961, at the Christian Home for the Aged in Houston, Texas, and is buried in Grove Hill Memorial Park in Dallas. Her legacy lives on in the Delta Kappa Gamma Society International, and other progressive organizations, to which she contributed, as well as in the Library of Congress, where reside the thousands of songs and stories that she collected and documented alongside her eminent husband.

The John Avery Lomax Family Papers, 1842, 1853–1986, are held by the Dolph Briscoe Center for American History at The University of Texas, Austin. The papers contain correspondence, song lyrics, music, literary productions, diaries and logs, scrapbooks, classified files, financial records, photographs, phonograph recordings, audio tapes, and newspaper and magazine clippings.
