= David Schnaufer =

American folk musician

David Schnaufer (September 28, 1952 – August 23, 2006) was an American folk musician. He is widely credited with restoring the popularity of the Appalachian dulcimer.

Schnaufer was born in Hearne, Texas, and grew up in La Marque, Texas. Schnaufer was an award-winning dulcimer player and session musician. He moved to Nashville, Tennessee, during the 1980s, and in 1995, accepted a position at Vanderbilt University's Blair School of Music, where he taught dulcimer as an associate adjunct professor. He established himself as one of the country's premier dulcimer players. He played the dulcimer on recordings with The Judds, Emmylou Harris, Johnny Cash, and Chet Atkins, among others. One of his earliest recordings was on Mark O'Connor's 1988 album Elysian Forest. O'Connor had initially sought out Schnaufer after hearing him play an instrumental version of the Joni Mitchell song "Both Sides Now". Schnaufer also released several solo albums of dulcimer music. He had many students, one of whom was the singer Cyndi Lauper.

Schnaufer died at Alive Hospice in Nashville on August 23, 2006, after a battle with cancer. In June of 2006 he had been diagnosed with an aggressive form of lung cancer that had already spread to his brain. He underwent chemotherapy and radiation therapy, but it was far too late, and he was moved into a local hospice, where was cared for in his last days by friends and fellow musicians.

== Discography ==
- Elysian Forest (Mark O'Connor, 1988)
- Dulcimer Player Deluxe (SFL, 1989)
- Dulcimer sessions (SFL, 1992)
- The Cactus Brothers (Liberty, 1993)
- Tennessee music box (Rivertime Records, 1996)
- Delcimore (The Orchard, 2000)
- Uncle Dulcimer (Delcimore Recordings, 2001)
- Appalachian Mandolin and Dulcimer: Music (Soundart Recordings, 2006), recorded with Butch Baldassari
