= George Ensle =

American singer-songwriter

George Ensle is a folk and country singer-songwriter and guitarist from Texas.

== Biography ==
Ensle was born in Houston, Texas on September 6, 1948. His parents gave him his first guitar when he was 13, after which he began to learn how to play classically. This classical training formed his unique fingerpicking style later in life.

As a teenager, Ensle joined the Houston folk club circuit, playing places like the Sand Mountain Coffee House, Theodore’s, Houlahan’s No. 2, Anderson Fair, and the Old Quarter. Though he moved to Austin in 1966 to attend the University of Texas, he continued to perform in both cities. It was in the club circuit that he first met fellow artists like Townes Van Zandt, Guy Clark, Don Sanders, Carolyn Hester, Jerry Jeff Walker, Vince Bell, Eric Taylor, Bill Staines, and Bill and Lucille Cade. He also played the college circuit in the 1970s, which included the University of Houston and Sam Houston State University, with Lindsay Haisley and Nanci Griffith.

In 1977, Ensle was one of six winners chosen out of over one hundred tapes sent to the 6th Kerrville Folk Festival songwriting competition, judged by Townes Van Zandt, Steve Young, and Bobby Bridger. Van Zandt would later include Ensle in a list of “contemporary performers he admire[d]” - a list composed of Guy Clark, David Olney, Gamble Rogers, and Pat White.

In 1978 and 1979, Ensle was an artist-in-residence at economically disadvantaged schools in Beaumont and Victoria, Texas. He worked with elementary and middle school students to cultivate an atmosphere of creativity, encouraging them to write poetry, songs, and prose.

After working in the schools, Ensle created and released his first album, Head On, in 1980. He followed the album release with a tour in Colorado.

Around 1990, Ensle met and began to mentor Will T. Massey as Massey went on to cut his first album. The resulting eponymous album was successful; Massey used some of the money he made from its sales to pay for the production of Ensle’s Heartwood album.

In 2008, Ensle was nominated for the Texas Music Awards’ singer-songwriter of the year.

Some of Ensle’s many songs have been recorded by other artists, including Gary P. Nunn, Bob Cheevers, Will T. Massey, and Jeff Talmadge.

Ensle continues to write, both commercially and charitably. He created "Portrait Songs," a business through which he crafts original and personalized songs for individuals and their loved ones. In recent years, he has also written portrait songs for patients in hospice care. He regularly hosts songwriting showcases that support and encourage fellow songwriters.
