= Sand Mountain Coffee House =

Music venue in Houston, Texas

Coordinates: 29.7343°N 95.3942°W

Sand Mountain Coffee House was a venue and home to Houston folk musicians from 1965 to 1977. Guy Clark, Townes Van Zandt, Jerry Jeff Walker, and Don Sanders were notable artists who wrote, performed, and sometimes lived at the coffee house.

== History ==
In their senior year at Spring Branch High School, John Carrick and Steve Gladson decided that Houston needed a space for teens to listen to folk music. At the time, the only real space for folk music was in the clubs, coffee houses, and the Jewish Community Center where the Houston Folklore Society held its monthly meetings. The Jester Lounge and the Balladeer had since gone out of business, and La Maison had turned instead to rock. They raised $170 to purchase the former Calvert Dance Studio at 1213 Richmond Street by hosting house parties and asking for donations at the door. After this initial fundraising effort, Carrick’s mother, Corrine, took over the administrative role of the coffee house for the two minors.

John Carrick named the venue the Sand Mountain Coffee House, in homage to his favorite song, The Delmore Brothers’ “Sand Mountain Blues.” Sand Mountain’s opening night in May 1965 featured Kathy Rote, John Carrick, Carolyn Terry, Dave Singleton, and Ted Rosco.

Over the next four years, Sand Mountain established itself as a fixture in the Houston folk scene, filling much of the space that the Jester had left behind. “The place was packed every night that first summer,” Carrick said. “There was a big involvement in music.” Musicians exchanged sets at the coffee house for room and board, helping Mrs. Carrick manage the building when her son was out of town on gigs of his own. She took on the role of adoptive mother to the crowds of musicians and kids who swarmed the place, supporting them and keeping up with them even after they left Houston in search of fame. In 1970, Carrick moved to Austin and Mrs. Carrick took full control of the establishment.

The crowd at Sand Mountain slowed in the ‘70s as competitors popped up and gained in popularity. Carolyn Terry once earned just $2.50 after a Tuesday evening spent playing to a five-person audience. Sand Mountain found itself forced to change to meet the times. It began to offer alcoholic beverages about a year after the Texas state government legalized liquor by the drink in April of 1971. By this point, the musicians who used to frequent Sand Mountain had already started to relocate to the Old Quarter, searching for better pay and less innocent audiences. In 1974, Mrs. Carrick’s health began to decline and Carrick returned from Austin to take over. In an effort to keep Sand Mountain modern, Carrick booked the progressive country acts that his mother had refused for many years.

Sand Mountain continued to fade out of the public eye over the course of 1975 and 1976. It gave way to other Montrose venues, including: the Anderson Fair Retail Restaurant, Bull and Anchor, Carnaby’s, Corky’s, Houlahan’s No. 2, La Bodega, Liberty Hall, Prufrock’s, Rosewater’s, Steamboat Springs, the Texas Opry House, and Theodore’s. Though it was still open in fall of 1976, Sand Mountain had stopped advertising its shows in the Houston Chronicle and shut down forever in 1977.

== Atmosphere ==
George Ensle and Jay Boy Adams both separately described Sand Mountain Coffee House as a quiet, respectful venue. There were two rooms available for performances - the front, east room was used more frequently than the rear, west room, but both were outfitted with noisy air conditioning units. In tribute to their many performances, the back room was decorated with a large mural of Guy Clark, Townes van Zandt, Don Sanders, Jerry Jeff Walker, and Mickey Newbury. They were dimly lit, full of circular tables and candles. In January of 1975, another game room was added on to the structure.

“They served no booze,” Guy Clark said. “Everybody was into being esoteric over coffee.” The sober, listening audiences gave artists a kind of attention they would not find at other music clubs and halls with alcohol licenses.

Initially, Sand Mountain was open from 7:30 PM until midnight on Sundays and Thursdays, and until 2:00 AM on Fridays and Saturdays. They closed on Mondays. By the early 1970s, Sand Mountain started opening at 9:00 PM every night of the week.

The menu was limited, a reminder that customers were there for the music, not for the food. In the early days, the coffee house offered several options for soft drinks and coffee. Popcorn, pizza, and “poor boys” made up the entirety of the food menu. Beer and wine were added in 1972.

== Artists ==
Sand Mountain Coffee House became more than a venue to its Montrose-based performers. It was an incubator that allowed like-minded artists to bounce lyrics, riffs, and ideas off of each other as they found their own voices and styles. Don Sanders brought Townes Van Zandt to Sand Mountain shortly after it opened, and things began to click. When Guy Clark returned from a failed foray into the Peace Corps several years later, he met his first wife, Susan Spaw, and connected with Van Zandt at Sand Mountain. Sanders credited Jerry Jeff Walker with teaching him how to string songs together at the coffee house. Van Zandt and his first wife, Fran Petters, lived in the apartment above the venue for a time in 1967 or 1968, and Sanders later lived at and helped book Sand Mountain.

Though it is disputed whether Janis Joplin was offered a gig at Sand Mountain or a job waitressing, Mrs. Carrick recalled Joplin’s performances. “She wasn’t pretty and cleared the place out. Nobody could stand her. I thought she was great, I really did, a good voice. The customers left, but I hired her back again because she was good and needed encouragement.”

In January 1975, the ten-piece Texas Southern University Jazz Ensemble performed every Sunday from three to six in the afternoon. They played through at least the end of March, due to popular demand.

== Notable performers ==
- Don Sanders
- Townes Van Zandt
- Guy Clark
- Jerry Jeff Walker
- Mickey Newbury
- Lightnin' Hopkins
- Vince Bell
- Bill Staines
- Mance Lipscomb
- Doc Watson
- Janis Joplin
- Johnny Winter
- Jay Boy Adams
- John A. Lomax
- Steve " HONDO" Downing
