= Dana Cooper =

American singer-songwriter

Dana Cooper is an American singer-songwriter from Missouri. His awards include the 2014 Heritage Musician award from the Pilgrim Center for the Arts in Kansas City, MO and Folk Alliance International's 2015 Spirit of Folk award. He has performed on Austin City Limits, Mountain Stage and at the Kerrville Folk Festival. Cooper's songs have been recorded by a long list of artists that include Trout Fishing in America, Rex Foster, Claire Lynch, Maura O’Connell, Pierce Pettis, and Susan Werner. Fellow singer-songwriter Buzz Holland has said “Cooper is a person who can sing like an angel and play like the devil.”

Singer-Songwriter	Dana Cooper
Born:	April, 1951
Hometown:	Kansas City, MO
Dates Active:	1970s - Present
Genre:	Pop/Rock/Folk
Styles:	Contemporary Folk
Associated Acts:	Shake Russell, Jack Saunders, Michael Marcoulier, John Vandiver

== Early music and career ==
Dana Cooper was born in Kansas City, Missouri in 1951. From an early age, he expressed an interest in singing and playing drums, guitar, and harmonica. By thirteen he had begun writing his own songs and by sixteen he was regularly performing at the Vanguard Coffeehouse and Sign Coffeehouse in Kansas City. He was awarded several scholarships, but only attended college for a year before dropping out to focus on music.

Cooper moved to Los Angeles in the early 1970s to work on his debut solo album with Elektra Records. Dana Cooper was released in 1973, featuring Leland Sklar on bass and Russ Kunkel on drums. Around 1975, Cooper's longtime friend and fellow songwriter Shake Russell began to send letters to Cooper, encouraging him to move to Houston, Texas. In 1977, Cooper was finally convinced and moved to Texas, where he began writing, performing and recording with Russell. They formed the Shake Russell/Dana Cooper Band shortly after Cooper arrived. Their bandmates included Michael Mashkes on bass and guitar, Jim Alderman on drums and piano, and Pete Gorisch (and, later, Riley Osbourn) on keyboard. The group played gigs in the Houston club circuit like Anderson Fair, Steamboat Springs, and Rockefeller's. During its five-year run, the Shake Russell/Dana Cooper Band released three albums. The self-produced Songs on the Radio (1978) sold over 10,000 copies between Houston and Austin without the help of a major distributor. In 1980, the group appeared on Austin City Limits. The Shake Russell/Dana Cooper Band was released through Michael Brovsky's South Coast Records branch of MCA; the album took two years of work before it was released in 1981. In 1982, the Shake Russell/Dana Cooper Band worked with the Michael Marcoulier Band and John Vandiver to produce the Comin’ Home album on Twin Dream Records. The band separated shortly after, though members would continue to play together occasionally over the years.

Cooper went on to start his own power trio, DC3, a three-man indie rock-band featuring Al Del Gigante on bass guitar and Tim Davis on drums. The group released the indie single “Give Us the Money” in 1983, an eponymous self-produced cassette in 1985, and the Perpetual Man cassette in 1986.^{[3]} The band changed its name to the Nuclear Family in 1987 and released a self-titled album. In 1988, Cooper and his wife moved to Nashville, Tennessee, so that Cooper could focus on his solo career.

== Later music and recordings ==
Cooper released the solo CD Stone By Stone in 1992. Thrill of Love, a collaboration with Shake Russell and Jack Saunders, followed in 1994. Thrill of Love was named Album of the Year by the Houston Press/KLOL Music Awards. In 1995, Cooper released a live acoustic album, Roughly Speaking, which included a breadth of old and new material. His 1997 album Miracle Mile, produced by fellow Kansas City native Josh Leo, featured guest appearances by Lyle Lovett and Maura O'Connell. Miracle Mile was nominated for a Nashville Music Award as “Best Pop Album” and was chosen by Performing Songwriter Magazine as one of the top DIY recordings of the year. Harry Truman Built a Road was named one of the best records of 2002 by the Tennessean and was also chosen as one of the best DIY recordings for that year. Made of Mud, released on King Easy Records in 2005, won Cooper the “Best Male Songwriter” award by Indie Acoustic Project. In 2010 Cooper began working with guitarist/songwriter/producer Thomm Jutz. Together they have recorded four projects, The Conjurer in 2010, Road Show in 2012, Building a Human Being in 2015, and Incendiary Kid in 2017.

Cooper has become an integral figure in the Nashville songwriting community, collaborating with renowned writers like Tom Kimmel, Kim Carnes and Don Henry. Cooper has been invited to participate in songwriting workshops from Belfast to Copenhagen to Austin.

== Discography ==
=== Solo work ===
Year	Album	Label
1973	Dana Cooper	Elektra
1987	Nuclear Family	Skram Records
1988	Complicated Stuff	Self-published
1992	Stone by Stone	Jalapeno Records
1997	Miracle Mile	Compass Records
2001	Harry Truman Built a Road	Dog Eared Records
2005	Made of Mud	King Easy Records
2010	The Conjurer	Dog Eared Records
2012	Road Show	Dog Eared Records
2015	Building a Human Being	Self-published
2017	Incendiary Kid	Travianna

=== Collaborations ===
Year	Performers	Album	Label
1978	Shake Russell with Dana Cooper	Songs on the Radio	Cherry Records
1981	Shake Russell / Dana Cooper	The Shake Russell - Dana Cooper Band	Southcoast Records, MCA Records
1981	The Shake Russell/Dana Cooper Band, John Vandiver, The Michael Marcoulier Band	Comin' Home	Twin Dream Records
1986	Dana Cooper's DC3	Perpetual Man	Self-published
1998	Shake Russell and Dana Cooper	Love's Bright Campaign	Jalapeno Records
2011	Dana Cooper, Annika Fehling	Visby, Texas	Rootsy
