= Rock Romano =

Roger Francis Romano (born February 14, 1945) is an American, Houston-based, audio engineer, record producer, guitarist, and bassist. Romano’s Red Shack Recording Studio in the Heights has been a key fixture in the Houston music scene since 1989.

== Early life ==
Rock Romano was born in the Fifth Ward of Houston, Texas, United States. He grew up enjoying music and art and by the age of 13, was already being paid to play guitar. He attended the University of St. Thomas with an interest in art history and painting. John and Dominique de Menil supported his artwork, even matching some of his school grants. The Menils arranged for Romano’s art to be showcased at Houston’s Louisiana Gallery, where Romano and his band at the time, The Fun and Games Commission , also played music on the veranda.

== Music career ==
In 1969, a newly graduated Romano stepped away from painting and into the Houston music scene. During the 1970s and 1980s, he joined the crowd of Montrose musicians that included Townes Van Zandt, Guy Clark, Eric Taylor, Richard Dobson, and Don Sanders. Romano created and appeared in a number of short-lived bands over the years, including Little Fitz, the Baroque Brothers, Smokin Fitz, and the New Texas Bluesicians. The Fun and Games, formerly known as Sixpentz and Sixpence, was one of Romano’s first groups. Fun and Games released its album, Elephant Candy, in 1968. The album's most notable singles were "Elephant Candy" and "The Grooviest Girl in the World".

In 1972, he formed a jam band known as the Rockin' Blue Diamonds along with Frederick Barthelme, Mayo Thompson and Tucker Bradley. But later included Fred McLain on lead guitar, Bob Henschen on piano, Bernard Sampson on saxophone and flute, Don Jones on bass and Art Kidd on drums. They performed a few shows, and guitarist John Fahey offered Thompson $250 to record a demo. However, Fahey and his wife did not like the recording, and the group later disbanded.

Romano was also a part of the Natives for a year in the late 1970s. In addition to playing on Herschel Berry and the Natives' 1981 album New Rock and Roll, Romano also engineered the album.

In 1979, Romano, Kenneth Blanchet (formerly of Steppenwolf and the Sherwoods), Michael Knust (of Fever Tree), and Rich Layton founded the big party band, Doctor Rockit. The Sisters of Mercy, Cindy Thrall and Lisa Williams, joined shortly after. When Doctor Rockit first started, the rock group struggled to land gigs. Romano instead threw parties at his own home where the band could play and focused on gaining audiences by word of mouth. Soon, Dr. Rockit and the Sisters of Mercy had hundreds of people in attendance at shows at Anderson Fair, Rockefeller's, the Magnolia Ballroom, the Houston Festival at Sam Houston Park - they even once opened for Bo Diddley at Fitzgerald’s. The group’s composition changed frequently, with members coming and going. In 1982, Doctor Rockit and the Sisters of Mercy released their Great Big Fun album with Romano on guitar and vocals; Kip Milwee on bass; Layton on harmonica; Wylie Hudgins on drums; Mike Sumler on piano; and Thrall and Williams providing vocals. The band's run concluded in a final show for Romano's 40th birthday on February 14, 1985, at Fitzgerald's, but the group still reunites every few years - typically on Romano’s birthday - to perform.

Romano continues to perform and tour with other Houston-based musicians, including Trudy Lynn and Steve Krase.

== Recording career ==
In 1969, Romano started working at Andrus Studios with Frank Davis and Walt Andrus. He engineered demos for a long list of artists that includes Lightnin’ Hopkins, Mayo Thompson, Roy Head, The Glass Kans, and Fever Tree. After Andrus, he worked as head engineer at H&S recording studios, where he worked with Don Sanders, Richard Dobson, Tom Cummings, and many others. He next worked as chief engineer at Rampart Studios, where he recorded acts including Dickie Malone, Lanier Greig, Jeff and the Kickers, Eric Johnson, and Jimmy Raycraft. After leaving Rampart Studios, he worked with Hank Alrich to set up an 8-track recording studio in the basement of Austin's Armadillo World Headquarters. Here, they recorded Freddy King, Captain Beefheart, Buffy Sainte-Marie, NRBQ, and Shiva’s Headband.

In 1989, Romano took over a small recording studio in the Heights and rechristened it the Red Shack Recording Studio. The Red Shack has been a fixture in the Houston music scene since its opening; Romano has since worked with hundreds of artists to record and engineer albums. Through the Red Shack, he has worked with artists including Ally Venable, Steve Krase, Diane Kolby, Pete Mayes, Mayo Thompson, and Richard Dobson. In recent years, he has been involved with the Connor Ray Music label. He produced Trudy Lynn’s Royal Oak Blues Cafe which reached the No. 1 spot on Billboard's Top Blues Albums in 2014.

== Art ==
Romano has also found success through his visual artwork roots in recent years. In August 2013, the d.m. allison art gallery hosted an exhibition of Romano's artwork. It was the gallery's most popular exhibition to date - in the month that his paintings were in the gallery, Romano sold all 38, in addition to three extra commissioned pieces.

== Discography ==
Year	Album	Group	Label
1968	Elephant Candy	The Fun and Games Commission	UNI Records
1982	Great Big Fun	Dr. Rockit and the Sisters of Mercy	Perfect Circle Records
