= Linda Lowe =

American poet and singer-songwriter producer

Linda Lowe is a poet, singer-songwriter producer, recording artist and the founder of Writers in the Round Concert Series, a community sponsored, non-profit performing arts organization dedicated to connecting and mentoring creative writers and musicians. She has recorded seven albums of original music on her Rollin’ Records label, including a duet album with Steve Gillette entitled "So Far Apart" produced by her husband, Karl Caillouet. Her songs "Let Her Go Gently," “Amber Eyes," and "Someday I’ll Be a Bluebird" are used in hospices and funerals across the country. She is currently working at The Red Shack studio with Rock Romano in Houston, Texas mixing music from an album produced by Robert Palmer entitled "Lucid Dreamer". She is the author of the "Little by Little" production, a musical presented at Main Street Theater in 1996 and again in 2017 with Xavier Educational Academy students in the Rice University Village. She and her daughter, Michelle Caillouet, began the Music and Drama department for Xavier Educational Academy in West University Place, Texas. For over 10 years Writers in the Round presented its concert series at Hamman Hall with Linda hosting and directing each show. Writers in the Round will celebrate its 35th anniversary in the 2024-2025 season at Main Street Theater in Rice University Village where it began in 1990.

Linda's archives are currently being collected and preserved for her contribution to Arkansas and Texas Music at The University Of Arkansas Fayetteville,

Rice University's Woodson Research Center and Texas State University's Texas Music History Department.

On May 17th Linda was awarded the 2025 Community Builder Award in recognition of her distinguished service and personal Contributions to the community of Houston, Texas, presented by Holland Lodge No. 1, A.F.&A.M. Houston, Texas.

== Biography ==
Linda Lowe was born in Hot Springs, Arkansas in 1950. She grew up in San Antonio, Texas and was a baby sitter for several DJ's at KTSA Radio where she was given boxloads of 45 records of all the current hits in the 1960s including Motown artists which helped inspire her to write poetry. Her first radio commercial was on bicycle safety airing on the Ricki Ware show on KTSA at age 9 or 10 years old. At the age of 15 her family moved back to Little Rock, Arkansas, where she graduated from Little Rock Central High School. While in high school she worked for Governor Winthrop Rockefeller and Graphic Communications touring the tiny towns of Arkansas with the Rockefeller campaign where she met Skeeter Davis (she would later reconnect with Skeeter at the Grand Ole Opry). Completing a production art course at MacArthur Park she became a paste up artist for the Air Scoop at Little Rock Air Force Base in Jacksonville, Arkansas. In 1970 she worked at Heritage Publishing Company as a type setter for the American Fishfarmer magazine and met Ringo Jukes who became her mentor and offered to publish her first book of Poetry called "All in Time". Another mentor who worked at the publishing company, John Beegle began writing her biography. Some time during the process of printing the poetry book, Heritage Publishing Company burned to the ground and none of the books were retrieved. Ringo Jukes and John Beegle gave their draft copy to Jimmy Dean and Bill Holland (who later also offered to publish the book) at Holland and Associates. She was hired as a national Time Buyer for the Jimmy Dean Sausage account where she worked from age 19–25. During that time she also appeared in TV commercials for Brut aftershave and a local Ford dealership. She began playing music in 1972 with Mary Gwin in the Little Rock area as "Me and My Friend" performing original music in local clubs and listening rooms. She met Rick Harrington while performing at the Leather Bottle and the Island X in Little Rock. Rick was managing a group called "Wildwood". They soon married and went out on the road with the group. Linda chose to lay down her guitar to work the sound for the popular group, but her marriage only lasted 9 months. Wildwood continues to work with Linda in her Writers in the round Concert Series and the Women in the round on the road touring group.

Lowe started writing when she was in her single digits. She remains a prolific songwriter, penning hundreds of songs. She moved to Houston in 1977 to continue a career in music, playing regularly at clubs and listening rooms in Houston and Austin while often traveling back to Arkansas to perform. Her favorite club to perform was Rockefeller's where she opened up for major acts including Bonnie Raitt, Jessie Collin Young, Donovan, and Loudon Wainwright, III. She was a regular at Morgenstern's in College Station and Anderson Fair. In 1984, Lowe was recognized as a winner of Kerrville Folk Festival’s New Folk Competition. Her song "Let Her Go Gently" on the Little by Little album was published in Sing Out Magazine and her 1977 custom OM cutaway guitar was featured in an ad for Collings guitars in the November 2005 issue of the Acoustic Guitar Magazine.

In 1981 Linda toured with Townes Van Zandt performing in concert at listening rooms in Eureka Springs, Fayetteville and Little Rock Arkansas. She produced a series called October Highlights scheduling concerts, PBS TV shows, and radio spots in conjunction with the UALR coffee house, and UALR Fine Arts Concert Hall to connect Texas and Arkansas songwriters. Townes Van Zandt continued to work with Linda as a regular guest in the round performing with her at Kerrville Folk Festival and Writers in the round at Main Street Theater. In 1982 she published her first album of original music called "Gamblin’ With the wind" on her record label Rollin’ Records featuring a mix of Arkansas and Texas musicians along with Robert Palmer. The Album was published by herself and Jerry Shook called Shooklin Publishing. In 1984 she toured Texas, the east and west coasts with Steve Gillette. Later, Linda toured Arkansas, Texas, Alabama, Florida and Carolina with various songwriters including Steve Young, Carolyn Hester, David Blume and Women in the round on the road. Linda married record producer and owner of Heights Sound Studio, Karl Caillouet in 1984. Working with Tony Rice, Bobby Clark and Linda's Upstairs band they recorded "So Far Apart" (a duet with Steve Gillette) and "Even the Moon" both produced and engineered by Karl Caillouet. Both were released on the Rollin’ Records label. In the late 1980s and early 1990s her producer was Robert Palmer, the author of Deep Blues, staff writer for The Rolling Stone Magazine, and the first New York Times pop music critic. Linda later introduced Townes Van Zandt to Robert Palmer when he was staying at her house while working on a book about the Rolling Stones. He fell in love with the music and she later put together a round at Main Street Theater with the three of them in the early 1990s. It was one of the first rounds of 30 years of WITR productions at Main Street Theater and Hamman Hall at Rice University. In the mid-1990s Linda partnered with Patsy Graham (the owner of Morgenstern's) and Mike Sumler with Rollin’ Records and Western Desert Publishing Company. The group released Mike's album entitled "Rain" and Linda's albums "The Rollin’ Records Collection" and "Little by Little".

In 1990, Lowe formed Writers in the Round Concert Series to help connect singer-songwriters and provide a smoke free family oriented theatrical venue where the focus was on the songs and the artists who wrote them instead of selling alcohol. She was part of a movement among house concert presenters and listening rooms throughout Texas which would Change the way songwriters were presented in the 21st century providing a more healthy platform for their performances. A Songwriters Paradise written about this movement was published in the Texas Highway Magazine. The group met at Rice Village's Main Street Theater and Rice University’s Hamman Hall. Many artists performed and participated in the group over the years, including Tom Paxton, Selia Qynn, Aura Lee Emsweller, Don Sanders, Vince Bell, Bill Staines, Mike Sumler, Eric Taylor, Still on the hill, Malcolm Smith, Becky Smith, Sean Walters, Kevin Welch, Cheryl Wheeler, Michael Smith (author of The Dutchman), Buddy Mondlock, Kate Campbell, Slaid Cleaves, Catie Curtis, Ann Hill's, Emily Kaitz, Tom Kimmel, Jimmy LeFave, Bill Morrissey, Sisters Morales, Beaver Nelson, Carrie Newcomer, Tim O’Brien, James Gilmer, Steve Earle, Carolyn Hester, Loudon Wainwright III, Arlo Guthrie, Janis Ian, Trout Fishing in America, Patty Larkin, Lucinda Williams, Hans Theessink, the women of Kerrville, Christine Albert and Chris Gage, Lynn Langham and Doug Gill, Steve Young (author of seven bridges road), Gregg Brown, Rock Romano, Mood Indigo, Shake Russell And Dana Cooper, George Ensle, Wildwood, Bill Haymes, Rod Kennedy's Book Signing, Mary Ann Willis (author of 13 books for Mel Bay Violin instruction), Leah Zeger, Robert Palmer, Ray Wylie Hubbard, David Broza, David Amram and Townes Van Zandt.

At one of Writers in the Round's concerts, on March 16, 1994, Lowe introduced Townes Van Zandt, David Amram, and David Broza. Van Zandt, Broza, and Lowe began to talk about the possibility of collaborating to publish some of Van Zandt's old poems in song form. There is a video of the entire concert including breaks in the Writers in the round DVD archives which captures their mutual respect, warmth and camaraderie. After Van Zandt died in 1997, Broza began to work on writing music for ten of Van Zandt's never-before-seen pieces. Writers in the round presented the Texas Release of Night Dawn at the Chelsea Market location of Main Street Theater where David Broza performed with GE Smith. Writers in the round students, Abby Boyce and Gabrielle Heal opened the show with "Poncho and Lefty". He released the album in 2010 as Night Dawn: The Unpublished Poetry of Townes Van Zandt.

Another memorable Writers in the Round concert was at Rice University's Hamman Hall on December 13, 1995. Linda hosted a show featuring Lucinda Williams, Ray Wylie Hubbard and Steve Earle. This was Steve's first concert having been released from prison, and the concert was initially slated to include Townes Van Zandt. At some Point during the packed concert The Baker Fraternity streaked down the Isles of Hamman Hall which caused a bit of a scene. The comments from all the artists on stage were comical and memorable.

At first, Writers in the Round was only open to adult songwriters. By 2000, however, Lowe had expanded the organization to create a non-competitive, nurturing performance space called The Moody Blue Room, an Eagle Scout service project for Southside resident and WITR student Ted Boozalis Now called The George E. Graham Moody Blue Room. The creative space helped to offer an incubator for youth who were interested in learning how to play instruments, perform together and solo, record and pen their own songs. She co wrote and produced "West U Dreams", a collection of original songs by her students. She continues to mentor young songwriters through Music camps and performances with the Writers in the round performing artists in residence program and at Xavier Educational Academy in West University Pace, Texas. Since starting Writers in the Round, she has helped launch similar programs in Florida, North Carolina, Arkansas, and Indiana.

== Discography ==
The Rollin’ Records Collection Rollin’ Records 1984

Year	Album	Label
1982	Gamblin' With the Wind	Rollin' Records
1990	Even the Moon	Rollin’ Records
1996	Little by Little	Rollin’ Records

1984 So Far Apart Rollin’ Records

2005 West U Dreams Rollin’ Records

2019 Barbwire Heart Rollin’ Records

2023 Rollin’ Records Revival
