= Richard Dobson =

American singer-songwriter

Background information
- Born: Richard James Joseph Dobson II; March 19, 1942; Tyler, Texas, U.S.
- Died: December 16, 2017 (aged 75) Diessenhofen, Switzerland
- Genres: Country, folk
- Occupations: Singer, songwriter, musician
- Instruments: Guitar, vocals
- Years active: 1970s – 2017
- Labels: Buttermilk, Rinconada, RJD, Brambus, Sundown
- Formerly of: State of the Heart, Dick & the Dirt, Earthmover
- Website: www.richard-j-dobson.ch

Richard James Joseph Dobson II (March 19, 1942 – December 16, 2017) was an American singer-songwriter and author. Dobson was part of the outlaw country movement and spent time in the 1970s with Townes Van Zandt, Blaze Foley, Mickey White, Rex "Wrecks" Bell, Guy Clark, Steve Earle, Rodney Crowell, and "Skinny" Dennis Sanchez.

== Life and music ==
Dobson was born in Tyler, Texas, United States, and grew up in Houston and Corpus Christi. He attended St. Thomas High School in Houston and graduated from St. Michael's in Santa Fe, New Mexico in 1960. During Dobson's brief stint at Georgetown University for international relations, he was influenced by folk music and bluegrass. He took off from school for several years and spent some time in Colombia; eventually, he returned to Houston and enrolled at the University of St. Thomas, graduating with a degree in Spanish in 1966. After graduation, he went to Chile with the Peace Corps for a year and a half, taught for a year in Michigan, tried his hand at being a writer in New York City, and grew more confident in his guitar skills.

Dobson moved to Nashville in 1971 with just a handful of songs already written. He had read an article about Kris Kristofferson's success as a college-educated musician and felt inspired to follow suit. He shared a house with Rodney Crowell and "Skinny" Dennis Sanchez and began to meet other songwriters, including Guy Clark, Townes Van Zandt, and Mickey White. Guy Clark demoed Dobson's "Baby Ride Easy" and, later, co-wrote the song "Old Friends" with Susanna Clark and Dobson. He later toured Jackson Hole and the Rockies with Van Zandt, White, and Rex Bell. Dobson also appeared in Heartworn Highways, a documentary that featured members of the Texas music scene - some living in Nashville - including Van Zandt, Clark, Steve Earle, and Rodney Crowell.

Dobson spent most of his life moving back and forth between Texas and Tennessee. He worked on shrimp boats in Galveston and oil rigs in the Gulf with Rex Bell when he needed money and a break from the industry, but he kept writing and playing even when he was on the ocean. He wrote the oft-recorded song "Baby Ride Easy" on a drilling rig off the shore of Louisiana before he first headed to Nashville.

When Dobson was in Houston, he frequently played Anderson Fair and the Old Quarter. On August 13, 1977, he appeared with St. Elmo's Fire on The Lil Ol' Show That Comes on After Monty Python. In Tennessee, he played at the Bluebird Cafe in 1982 with Kathy Mattea, Hugh Moffat, and R.D. Mowery. On January 22, 1995, Dobson and Townes Van Zandt were live guests on KUT radio. Hosted by Larry Monroe, they discussed their music, Blaze Foley, and played several songs.

Dobson released his first album, In Texas Last December, in 1977 through Buttermilk Records. He home-produced four albums, including Save the World (1983) and True West (1986). From 1977 to his last album within his life in 2016, Plenty Good People, Dobson released 23 albums. His last album I Hear Singing was finished posthumously, according to previous agreements by his band, and released on December 7, 2018.

In the late 1980s, Dobson formed the group State of the Heart with Mike Dunbar as producer and Susie Monick as banjo and mandolin player. They began performing around 1987, releasing Live at the Station Inn in 1988 and Hearts and Rivers in 1990. They toured Europe for about six weeks yearly, a tour that Dobson continued taking even after State of the Heart was no longer together.

Dobson co-wrote many songs with friends and fellow songwriters including: "Blue Collar Blues" with Ron Davies; "Hole in my Heart" with Steve Earle; "Long Gone Love Song" with Mickey White; "Love Train", "She's Gone to Memphis", and "Welcome to the Wild Side of Me" with Susanna Clark; "Old Friends" and "So Have I" with Guy and Susanna Clark; "One Bar Town" and "Que se yo?" with Pinto Bennett; "Pony Ride" with Hal Ketchum; "Uncertain Texas" with Rodney Crowell; many songs with Susie Monick; and the album Plenty Good People with W.C. Jameson.

His songs have been recorded by famous artists such as David Allan Coe ("Piece of Wood and Steel"), Guy Clark ("Forever, for Always, for Certain"; "Old Friends"), Lacy J. Dalton ("Old Friends"), Nanci Griffith ("Ballad of Robin Winter-Smith"), and Kelly Willis ("Hole in My Heart").

Dobson's song "Baby Ride Easy" was recorded as a duet by Carlene Carter and Dave Edmunds, Billie Jo Spears and Del Reeves, and by the Carter Family. For the TV show Christmas On The Road in Montreux in 1984 it was performed by Johnny Cash and June Carter Cash. Their duet version was released in 2014 on the posthumous album Out Among the Stars.

Dobson wrote an account of his years with Townes Van Zandt and others mentioned above, The Gulf Coast Boys, first published in 1997. A second book, Pleasures of the High Rhine — A Texas Singer in Exile, was published in February 2012. He irregularly published a newsletter known over the years as Poor Richard's Newsletter, Don Ricardo's Life & Times, and finally Don Ricardo's Report from the High Rhine. The newsletter - addressed to fans and friends - was in print through Omaha Rainbow and later on his website. A collection of the newsletters from 1978 to 2012 was released as The Years the Wind Blew Away: Don Ricardo's Life and Times in 2013.

Dobson moved to Switzerland in 1999 and lived there until his death. In 2002, he released an album with Thomm Jutz, a friend and musician he often played and recorded with in Europe. The album On Thistledown Wind was released in 2006. The following album, Back at the Red Shack, was recorded at Rock Romano's studio in Houston, Texas - the same studio where Dobson's first two albums were recorded. He returned to Thomm Jutz's studio in Nashville again in 2008, for the recording of From a Distant Shore and, in 2013, for Here in the Garden.

Richard Dobson died of cancer in Diessenhofen, Switzerland, on December 16, 2017, aged 75.

== Discography ==
=== Singles ===
Year	Single	Label
1977	"Baby Ride Easy" b/w "Learning to Forget You"	Buttermilk
197x	"The Hard Way" b/w "Swamp Rat"	Rinconada/Buttermilk

=== Albums ===
Year	Album	Label
1977	In Texas Last December	Buttermilk
1979	The Big Taste	Rinconada
1983	Save the World	RJD
1986	True West	RJD
1988	Live at the Station Inn	RJD
1990	Hearts & Rivers	Brambus
1993	Blue Collar Blues	Brambus
1994	Amigos - Richard Dobson Sings Townes Van Zandt	Brambus
1994	Mankind	Sundown
1995	Backtracks: Save the World/True West	RJD
1995	One Bar Town	Brambus
1996	Love Only Love	Brambus
1998	Salty Songs	Brambus
1999	Global Village Garage	R&T Musikproduktion
2001	Hum of the Wheels	Brambus
2002	Doppelgaenger	Brambus
2003	A River Will Do	Brambus
2006	On Thistledown Wind	Brambus
2007	Back at the Red Shack	Brambus
2009	From a Distant Shore	Brambus
2013	Here in the Garden	Brambus
2014	Gulf Coast Tales	Self-Released
2016	Plenty Good People	
2018	I Hear Singing (posthumous finished and released)	Brambus
