= Wheatfield (band) =

American acoustic folk trio

Wheatfield (also known as St. Elmo’s Fire) started in 1973 as an acoustic folk trio based in Houston. The band was known for an eclectic style that drew on folk, country, rock, and jazz influences - Americana before its time. The group comprised Craig Calvert, Connie Mims, Cris “Ezra” Idlet, Bob Russell, Damian Hevia, and Keith Grimwood and was managed by Bob Burton. Wheatfield disbanded in 1979, but its members reunited in 2004 to perform and produce new music.

== History ==
While still attending Lamar High School in the early 1970s, Craig Calvert and Ezra Idlet briefly formed the duo “Neat Stuff.” The duo did not last long. In 1973, schoolmate Connie Mims graduated from high school and joined Calvert and Idlet in forming the band Wheatfield.

The original trio of Calvert, Mims, and Idlet found its first regular gigs at Tanney’s, a burger place near University of Houston, the Steak and Ale, and the Railhead Restaurant. The September after Mims graduated, Wheatfield was invited to perform in St. Croix, where the trio learned how to play as a tight band.

In 1974, they met “Beaver” Bob Russell, an architecture major at UH who was moonlighting as a lounge bassist at the time. He joined the band as its first bassist. Damian Hevia, a Cuban photographer, brought his percussion talents to the band in the same year.

After the legalization of liquor by the drink, Wheatfield played the exploding Houston club circuit at places like Liberty Hall and the Texas Opry House, as well as Austin shows at Armadillo World Headquarters, Cactus Cafe, and Castle Creek. They also proved popular at college events, making appearances at Sam Houston State University, University of Houston, and Rice University.

Wheatfield appeared on the first season of the PBS program Austin City Limits on February 27 and March 1, 1976. This initial exposure led to airplay on the radio, even though Wheatfield did not have a recording contract with a label.

Shortly after, however, Wheatfield discovered that another band in Oregon had already claimed the name "Wheatfield" and was threatening legal action. The Texas-based Wheatfield decided to call itself St. Elmo’s Fire, a name borrowed from its own production crew’s band.

In May of that same year, St. Elmo’s Fire performed 90 minutes of live, original music for James Clouser’s Caliban, a rock ballet version of Shakespeare’s The Tempest in Houston. Caliban resulted in three Jones Hall sell-outs. Around this time, Russell left the group and was replaced by Keith Grimwood, a classically-trained bassist who had formerly been a member of the Houston Symphony. The rock ballet travelled to Dallas and Chicago and returned to Houston the following year.

In 1977, St. Elmo’s Fire collaborated once more with Clouser on Rasputin, the Holy Devil at UH. The band also appeared on The Little Ol’ Show on September 17, 1977 and February 25, 1978. They decided to turn down offers from smaller record labels that managed ZZ Top and Heart because they were advised to wait for better offers that could catapult them into the national spotlight. St. Elmo’s Fire was an eclectic collection of talent that did not quite fit into the boxes that record labels were looking to fill. The bandmates wanted to avoid getting pigeonholed into a specific genre or style, but the waiting process took its toll over time.

Calvert left St. Elmo’s Fire in June 1979 to “pursue different musical goals.” The group had grown frustrated with its current status and finally disbanded in 1979.

The former band-members went on to continue creating music. Craig Calvert and Vince Bell combined acoustic and electric influences to create the duo Calvert Bell shortly after St. Elmo’s Fire separated. Calvert later formed the Austin-based Hotcakes band in 1985; Idlet and Grimwood formed Trout Fishing in America in 1979; Connie Mims pursued a solo career and work as a songwriter with Broadcast Music, Inc.

In the early 2000s, Calvert found old studio tapes in his parents’ home and shared them with the old members of St. Elmo’s Fire. The original trio got back together for a reunion tour in 2004, then invited Grimwood to join for a 2005 reunion tour. Idlet, Calvert, Mims, and Grimwood reunite annually to perform and write as Wheatfield once again. They have released three albums since their first reunion.

== Discography ==
Year	Album	Label
1978	"Lady Has No Heart" / "Rainbows Shatter" (45 single)	Arson Records
2004	Wheatfield	Canela Records
2007	Second Chances	Wheatfield
2014	Big Texas Sky	Wheatfield/Trout Records
