= Skinny Dennis =

American country musician

Background information
- Born: Dennis Sanchez; September 3, 1946
- Died: March 20, 1975 (aged 28) Sunset Beach, California, United States
- Genres: Country; Folk
- Instrument: Double bass
- Years active: 1970–1975

Skinny Dennis Sanchez (September 3, 1946 – March 20, 1975) was an American country musician who was based in the Los Angeles area. He played the upright bass, most famously accompanying Nashville musician Guy Clark during Clark's stay in Los Angeles. His nickname is in reference to his having Marfan syndrome; Sanchez stood at 6'11", and weighed 135 lbs.

He is most famously mentioned in the Guy Clark song "L.A. Freeway" (recorded by Guy Clark on his debut album, Old No. 1 in 1975 and first recorded by Jerry Jeff Walker in 1972). Clark's lyrics went as follows:

Here's to you ol' Skinny Dennis
The only one I think I will miss
I can hear your ol' bass singin'
Sweet and low like a gift you're bringin'

Sanchez was also friends with many in Clark's circle, including Townes Van Zandt, Rodney Crowell, Steve Earle, Richard Dobson and others. The 1981 country music documentary Heartworn Highways featuring those songwriters is dedicated to Sanchez. Richard Dobson recorded Sanchez' song "Bus Stop Coffee" for his albums In Texas Last December and One Bar Town.

Sanchez died at age 28 of heart failure on stage, playing the bass at Captain Jack's in Sunset Beach with John Malcolm Penn.
