= Live in Texas =

Live in Texas may refer to:

- Live in Texas (Linkin Park album), a 2003 CD & DVD album by Linkin Park
- Live in Texas (Lyle Lovett album), a 1999 album by Lyle Lovett
- Live in Texas (Vince Bell album), a 2001 album by Vince Bell

== See also ==
- Live in Texas: Dead Armadillos, a 1981 album by Trapeze
