= Gamble Rogers =

American singer-songwriter (1937–1991)

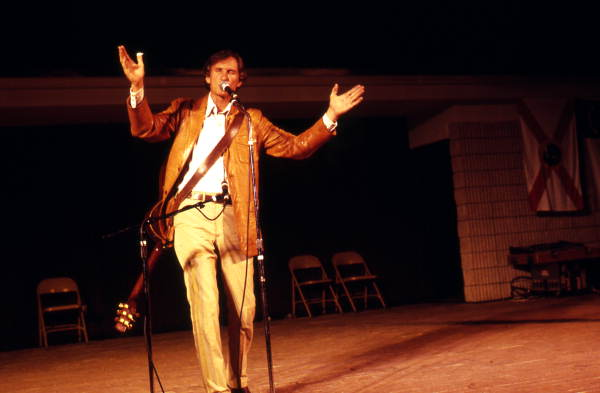
- Gamble Rogers performing at the Florida Folk Festival, White Springs, Florida

Background information
- Born: James Gamble Rogers IV; January 31, 1937; Winter Park, Florida, US
- Died: October 10, 1991 (aged 54)
- Genres: Folk
- Occupations: Singer-songwriter, author, artist, actor, screenwriter
- Instruments: Vocals, guitar
- Years active: 1961–1991
- Labels: Oklawaha Records, Flying Fish Records, Inc, Mountain Railroad Records, Inc
- Website: www.gamblerogers.org

James Gamble Rogers IV (January 31, 1937 – October 10, 1991) was an American folk artist musician and storyteller known for the recurring theme in his songs and stories about characters and places in a fictional Florida county. He was a 1998 inductee into the Florida Artists Hall of Fame.

== Biography ==
Born in Winter Park, Florida, Rogers was the namesake of two architects in the family – his father James Gamble Rogers II and great-uncle James Gamble Rogers. As a young man, he chose to become a musician—while on his way to interview for a job at an architecture firm, he attended a Serendipity Singers audition in New York City, borrowed a guitar, tried out, and was admitted to the group.

Gamble Rogers began performing around Florida in the 1960s, often performing with other Florida singer-songwriters Paul Champion, Jim Ballew, and Will McLean. By the 1970s, he was a regular fixture at the Florida Folk Festival, often as the headliner. He appeared in James Szalapski's 1976 country music documentary film Heartworn Highways, performing an onstage comic monologue followed by "Black Label Blues." By the 1980s, he was often featured on public television and public radio. As a self-described "modern troubadour," Rogers influenced musicians such as Jimmy Buffett and David Bromberg, with the former dedicating his album Fruitcakes to him. In their tribute to him, "Song for Gamble," Steve Gillette and his wife Cindy Mangsen describe him: "He had the gift of innocence, and a fondness for the key of 'E'."

While Rogers was camping at Flagler Beach, a frightened young girl ran to him, begging him to help her father, who was in trouble in rough surf. Compromised by spinal arthritis that had been worsening since childhood, Rogers nevertheless grabbed an air mattress and headed into the ocean in a rescue attempt. Both men died in the surf. In honor of his heroism, the Florida Legislature renamed the state park Gamble Rogers Memorial State Recreation Area at Flagler Beach. In St. Augustine, Florida, there is a middle school, Gamble Rogers Middle School, named after him.

Rogers received a tribute in the pages of Record Collector in 2023.

== Songs and stories ==
The characters and places in the fictional Oklawaha County, are a recurring theme in Rogers' songs and stories, although his earlier works referenced characters of the same names residing in non-fictional Winter Park, Florida, and Habersham County, Georgia.

Through years of onstage apprenticeship, Rogers refined and polished his one-man show into a single story line – a continuum he entitled, Oklawaha County Laissez-Faire.

== Oklawaha records ==
During the years since Rogers' death, his agent and business manager, Charles Steadham, acquired the intellectual property rights to Rogers' work and founded Oklawaha Records in Gainesville, Florida to present this material. Steadham has remastered and re-released most of Rogers' songs and stories, making them available through the website of the not-for-profit Gamble Rogers Memorial Foundation, Inc.

Catalog Number	Album/CD	Year	Originally published by	Original Year
OK1001	The Lord Gives Me Grace And the Devil Gives Me Style	1996	Mountain Railroad Records, Inc	1977
OK1002	Gamble Rogers Live: The Warm Way Home	1996	Mountain Railroad Records, Inc	1980
OK1003	Sorry Is As Sorry Does	2001	Flying Fish Records	1986
OK1004	Oklawaha County Laissez-Faire	1996	Oklawaha Records	1996
OK1005	Signs of a Misspent Youth	1999	Oklawaha Records	1999
OK1006	Good Causes	2003	Oklawaha Records	2003

== Award ==
Gamble Rogers was posthumously awarded the Kiwanis Award for bravery, the Carnegie Award for heroism, induction into the Florida Artists Hall of Fame and the NSA Lifetime Achievement Award (2001).
