= The Fun and Games =

American sunshine pop group

The Fun and Games were an American sunshine pop group from Houston, Texas, United States.

== History ==
Bandmembers Rock Romano, Mike Cemo, Paul Guillet, and John Bonno were all members of a band while in high school in Houston, Texas. After adding Richard Bain, D. J. Greer, and Carson Graham, they took the name The Six Pents, and worked as the house band at La Maison in Houston. They also recorded a single at local studio Andrus. After releasing the single, they changed their name to The Sixpentz, but after signing with Mainstream Records, they discovered that the name Sixpence was already being used by another group, so they changed their name again to The Fun and Games Commission. They released another single under this name and then abridged it on further releases to The Fun and Games. Gary Zekley heard the group's music and got them signed to UNI Records; around this time the lineup shuffled considerably, with Bonno and Greer departing and Joe Dugan and Joe Romano added to the lineup. Zekley produced their lone album, Elephant Candy (1968), and co-wrote several of the songs with Mitch Bottler. A single from the album, "The Grooviest Girl in the World", reached #78 on the Billboard Hot 100 in early 1969. The group broke up soon after; Rock Romano later played in the groups Doctor Rockit and the Sisters of Mercy, the Sheetrockers, and the band Duck Soup which Sam Irwin formed and sang lead for. A CD reissue of Elephant Candy with bonus tracks was released by Rev-Ola Records in 2005.

Joe Romano (born on December 1, 1949, in Houston, Texas) died of cancer on August 4, 2017, at age 67.

Sam Irwin (born on November 23, 1943, in Vivian, Louisiana) died from complications from an extended illness on February 9, 2025, at age 81.

== Members ==
- Sam Irwin – Lead vocals
- Rock Romano – rhythm guitar, vocals
- Joe Romano – bass, vocals
- Paul Guillet – guitar, vocals
- Joe Dugan – keyboards, vocals
- Carson Graham – drums

== Discography ==
- Elephant Candy (UNI Records, 1968)
