= Larry Jon Wilson =

American singer-songwriter

- Born: October 7, 1940; Swainsboro, Georgia, United States
- Origin: Augusta, Georgia, United States
- Died: June 21, 2010 (aged 69) Roanoke, Virginia, United States
- Genres: Country
- Occupations: Singer, musician
- Years active: 1975–2010

Larry Jon Wilson (October 7, 1940 – June 21, 2010) was an American country singer, guitarist and musician. He recorded "Through the Eyes of Little Children" and "I Betcha Heaven's on a Dirt Road".

== Biography ==
Born in Swainsboro, Georgia, Wilson picked up the guitar and taught himself how to play. In 1975, he released his debut album New Beginnings. Three more albums on the Monument record label imprint of CBS Records followed, Let Me Sing My Song to You (1976), Loose Change (1977), and The Sojourner (1979).

Despite Wilson's accolades and fans, no hit record emerged. Wilson left the music industry in 1980. He returned in the late 1980s when other songwriters encouraged him to attend the Frank Brown International Songwriter's Festival in Perdido Key, Florida. He began touring again in 1989, and by 2003 still accepted occasional engagements. Wilson remained devoted to his music, rather than to the marketplace.

Wilson appears in the documentary film Heartworn Highways recorded 1975–1976, where he is filmed recording the song "Ohoopee River Bottomland".

In 2008, Sony BMG released a new Wilson album, after a thirty-year hiatus from recording. In 2009, Drag City re-released the album in the US.

Wilson died following a stroke in June 2010, at the age of 69.

== Discography ==
- New Beginnings (1975)
- Let Me Sing My Song To You (1976)
- Loose Change (1977)
- The Sojourner (1979)
- Larry Jon Wilson (2008)
