= Recado =

Studio album by Vince Bell
- Released: May 8, 2007
- Genre: Alternative country
- Label: vincebell.com/SteadyBoy Records
- Producer: Cam King

Vince Bell chronology
Live in Texas (2001)	Recado (2007)

Recado is the fourth album by singer-songwriter Vince Bell. It was released on May 8, 2007.

== Track listing ==
1. "Isla"
2. "Give Chance a Chance"
3. "Where the Late Night Crowd Is Led"
4. "Ranch Land"
5. "Done That Too"
6. "Gypsy"
7. "Caribbe"
8. "Labor of Love"
9. "Mr. Mudd and Mr. Gold"
10. "Even Cowboys Get the Blues"
11. "Goodnight Lullaby"

=== Song credits ===
- "Isla," "Ranch Land," "Done That Too," "Gypsy": Vince Bell, Vince Bell Publishing (SESAC), administered by Bug Music
- "Give Chance a Chance," "Caribbe": Vince Bell, Bug Music (BMI)/Vince Bell Publishing (SESAC), administered by Bug Music
- "Where the Late Night Crowd is Led," "Labor of Love," "Even Cowboys Get the Blues," "Goodnight Lullaby": Vince Bell, Bug Music (BMI)/Black Coffee Music (BMI), administered by Bug Music
- "Mr. Mudd and Mr. Gold": Townes Van Zandt, TVZ Music (ASCAP)/Katie Belle Music (ASCAP)/Will Van Zandt Publishing (ASCAP), administered by Bug Music

== Album Facts ==
- Because "message," the English translation of the album's title, appeared on the back cover of the CD, the album was sometimes mistakenly identified in reviews as Message.

== Personnel ==
- Vince Bell -Pawless v2 model mesquite dreadnought acoustic guitar and vocals
- Bill Browder – piano and acoustic guitar
- Cam King – electric guitar, electric bass, keyboards, autoharp, harmonica, percussion
- Freddie Steady Krc – percussion
- Tammy Rogers – fiddle and mandolin
- Michael Woody – mandolin

== Production ==
- Producer: Cam King
- Executive producers: Sarah Wrightson and Vince Bell
- Mixing and mastering: Cam "El Mixador" King and Layton DePenning at Elmo's Lab, Manchaca, Texas
- Recording locations: The Real Deal, Santa Fe, New Mexico; DynaMike Studios, Nashville, Tennessee; Bowie Street Recorders, Fredericksburg, Texas; Elmo's Lab, Manchaca, Texas; SteadyGo Recording, Austin, Texas
