= Texas Plates =

Studio album by Vince Bell
- Released: April 13, 1999
- Genre: Alternative country
- Label: Paladin Records/Warner Bros.
- Producer: Robin Eaton

Vince Bell chronology
Phoenix (1994)	Texas Plates (1999)	Live in Texas (2001)

Texas Plates is the second album by the singer-songwriter Vince Bell. It was released on April 13, 1999, and found Bell comfortably ensconced in the upper echelon of the songwriting guild and signed to a major record label. Unfortunately, whatever marketing there was presented him as just another singer-songwriter, as if they were all cut from the same Texan cloth, and the album remains largely unheard.

== Track listing ==
1. "Poetry, Texas"
2. "All Through My Days"
3. "Push Comes to Shove"
4. "2nd Street"
5. "All The Way to the Moon"
6. "Place to Call Our Own"
7. "Best Is Yet to Come"
8. "Have Not, Will Travel"
9. "100 Miles from Mexico"
10. "The Fair"
11. "Last Dance at the Last Chance"

=== Song credits ===
- "All The Way to the Moon," "Best Is Yet to Come," "Have Not, Will Travel," "100 Miles from Mexico," "Place to Call Our Own," "Poetry, Texas": Vince Bell, TVB Publishing (BMI), administered by Bug Music
- "The Fair," "Push Comes to Shove," "2nd Street": Vince Bell, Bug Music (BMI)/TVB Publishing (BMI), administered by Bug Music
- "All Through My Days": Vince Bell and Connie Mims, Bug Music (BMI)/Black Coffee Music (BMI), administered by Bug Music
- "Last Dance at the Last Chance": Vince Bell, Bug Music (BMI)/Black Coffee Music (BMI), administered by Bug Music

== Album cover ==
- The photograph on the front cover of the album is of Bell's great grandparents, Emily Louise and William Strickland, circa 1940s. According to the liner notes: "They sold gas and feed, flour and cold drinks, and anything else anyone needed from their general store on Highway 67, outside of Red Water, Texas."

== Personnel ==
- Vince Bell – vocal, harmonies, guitar
- Pat Bergeson – harmonicas
- Lewis Brown – trombone
- Pat Buchanon – guitars, sitar
- Chris Carmichael – strings
- Robin Eaton – bass, baritone guitar, acoustic guitar, sitar, jaw harp
- Mickey Grimm – drums, percussion, cajón
- Dave Jacques – electric and acoustic bass
- Brad Jones – upright bass
- Al Perkins – banjo, steel, dobro, lap, pedal steel, Kona guitar
- Ross Rice – piano, bass, Moog, Vox organ, harmonium, Wurlitzer, Melodica, organ, vibes and Omnichord
- Elijah Shaw – E-Bow
- Aly Sujo – violin
- Fireworks - Tennessee State Fair
- Kami Lyle - guest vocalist
- Maura O'Connell - guest vocalist
- Alex Eaton - guest vocalist

== Production ==
- Producer: Robin Eaton
- Engineer and Mixer: Elijah Shaw

Recorded and mixed at Alex The Great Recording, Nashville, Tennessee

Mastered by James DeMain, Nashville, TN

== Reviews ==
- CD Shakedown review by Randy Krbechek, July 23, 1999
- Allmusic review by Bill Ashford
