= Gamble Rogers Memorial State Recreation Area at Flagler Beach =

State park in Florida, United States

Gamble Rogers Memorial State Recreation Area
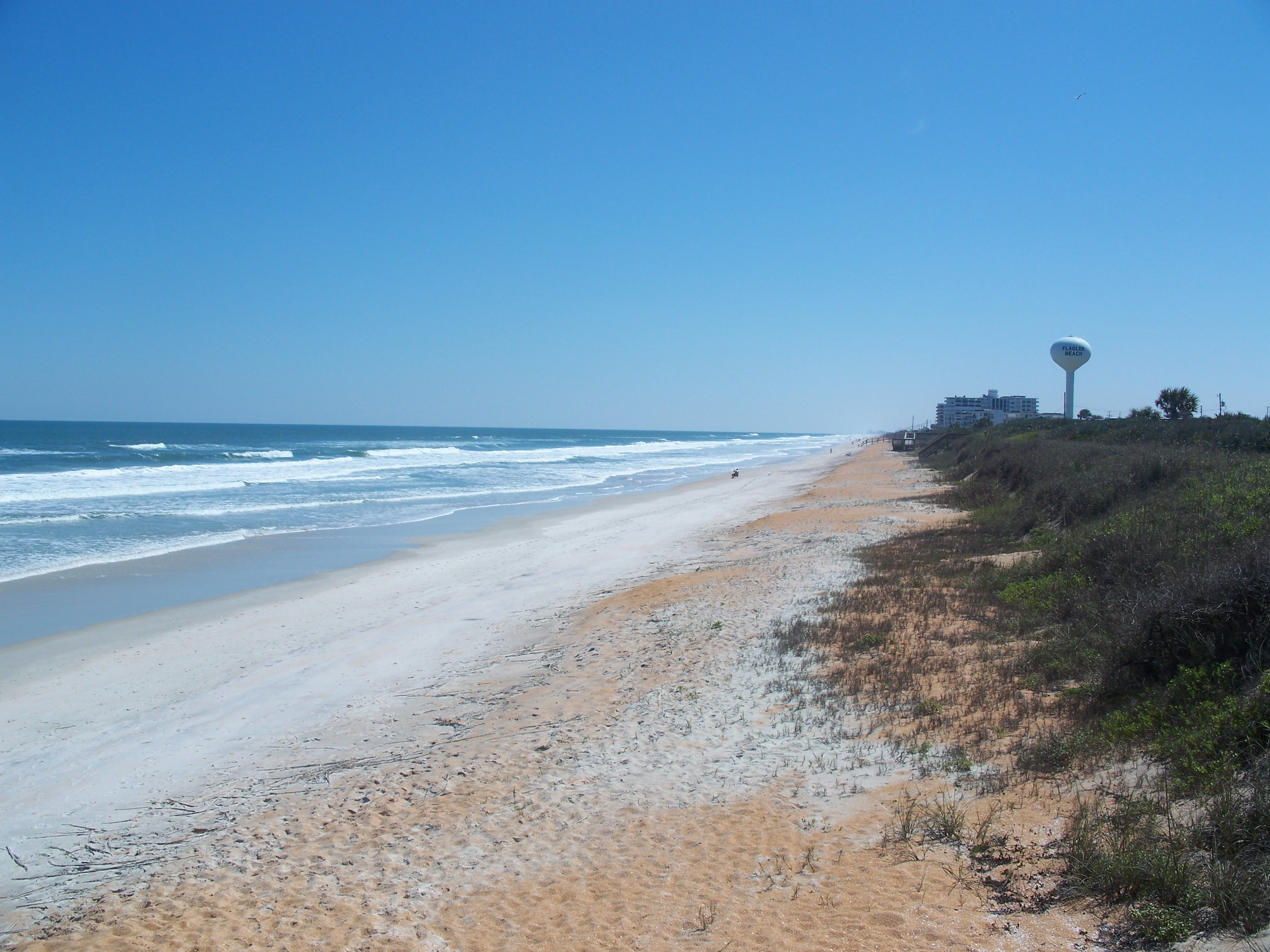
- View of the oceanfront

- Location within Florida Location within the United States
- Interactive map of Gamble Rogers Memorial State Recreation Area
- Location: Flagler County, Florida, United States
- Nearest city: Flagler Beach, Florida
- Coordinates: 29°26′13″N 81°06′40″W
- Area: 144 acres (0.58 km^{2})
- Governing body: Florida Department of Environmental Protection

Gamble Rogers Memorial State Recreation Area is a 144-acre (0.58 km^{2}) Florida State Park in Flagler Beach, Florida, United States, between the Atlantic Ocean and the Intra-Coastal Waterway on State Route A1A. It is about 18 miles (29 km) north of Daytona Beach and about 30 miles (48 km) south of St. Augustine.

== Naming ==
The park is named for Gamble Rogers, a Florida folk singer. On October 10, 1991, Rogers was camping in the area. In response to a child's plea for help, he attempted to rescue a Canadian tourist in the heavy surf and riptides of Flagler Beach. Both Rogers and the tourist drowned. The park was created by the Florida legislature in honor of this Florida folk singer/guitarist.

== Recreational activities ==
Activities include coastal camping, picnicking, swimming, paddleboarding, eco-tours, fishing, and beachcombing. Visitors can also enjoy sunbathing, bicycling, canoeing, boating, and wildlife viewing. Between May and early September, loggerhead, green and leatherback sea turtles are among the wildlife of the park.

Amenities include 34 campsites overlooking the Atlantic Ocean, boat ramp and boat basin with access to the Intracoastal Waterway, picnic tables, a large picnic pavilion, the 0.75-mile (1.21 km) Joe Kenner Nature Trail, the beach and hiking trails.

The nature trail passes through a maritime hammock dominated by live oaks, red bay trees, and cabbage palms.

== Hours ==
Florida state parks are open between 8 a.m. and sundown every day of the year (including holidays).

== Gallery ==
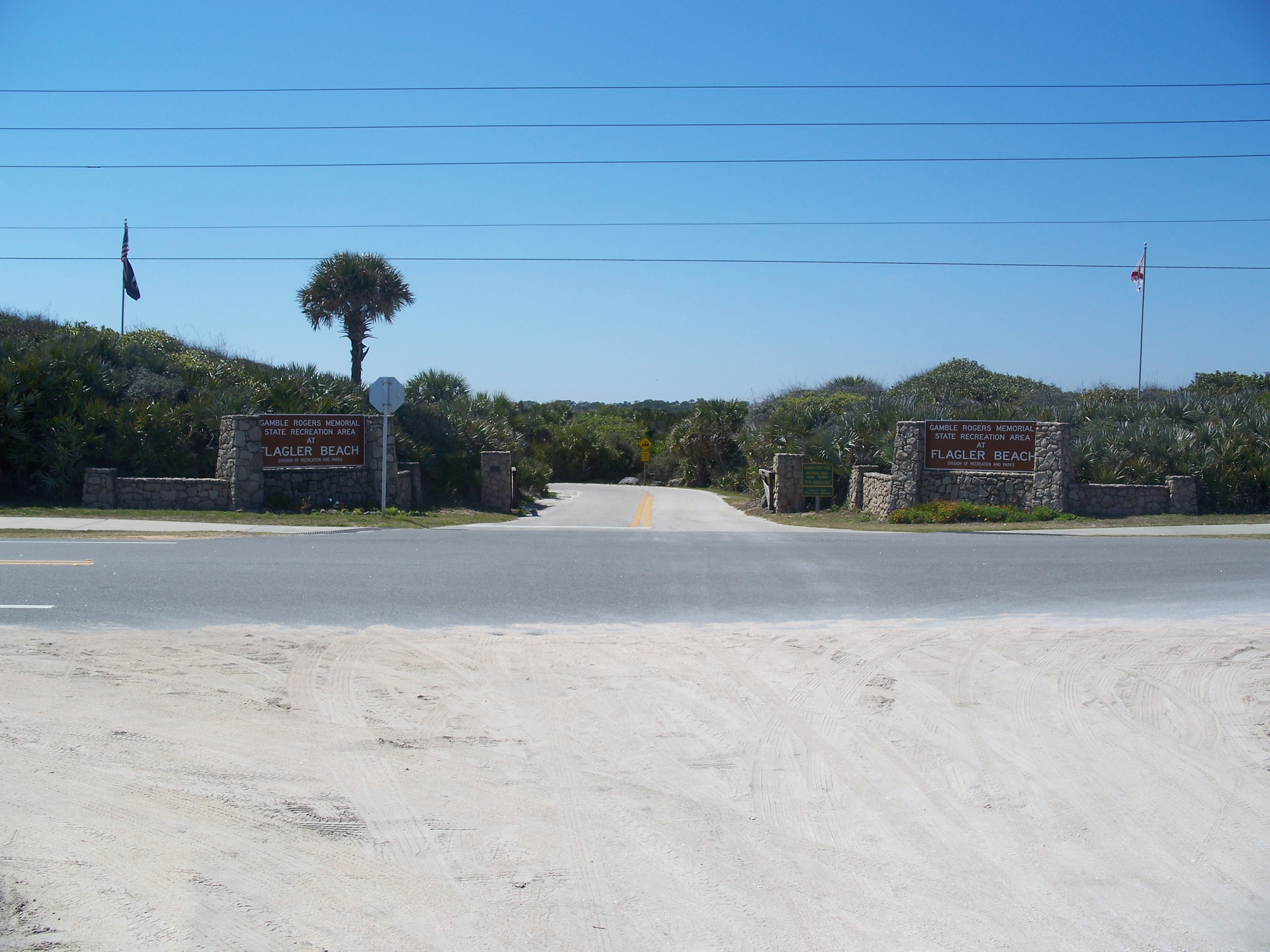
Entrance

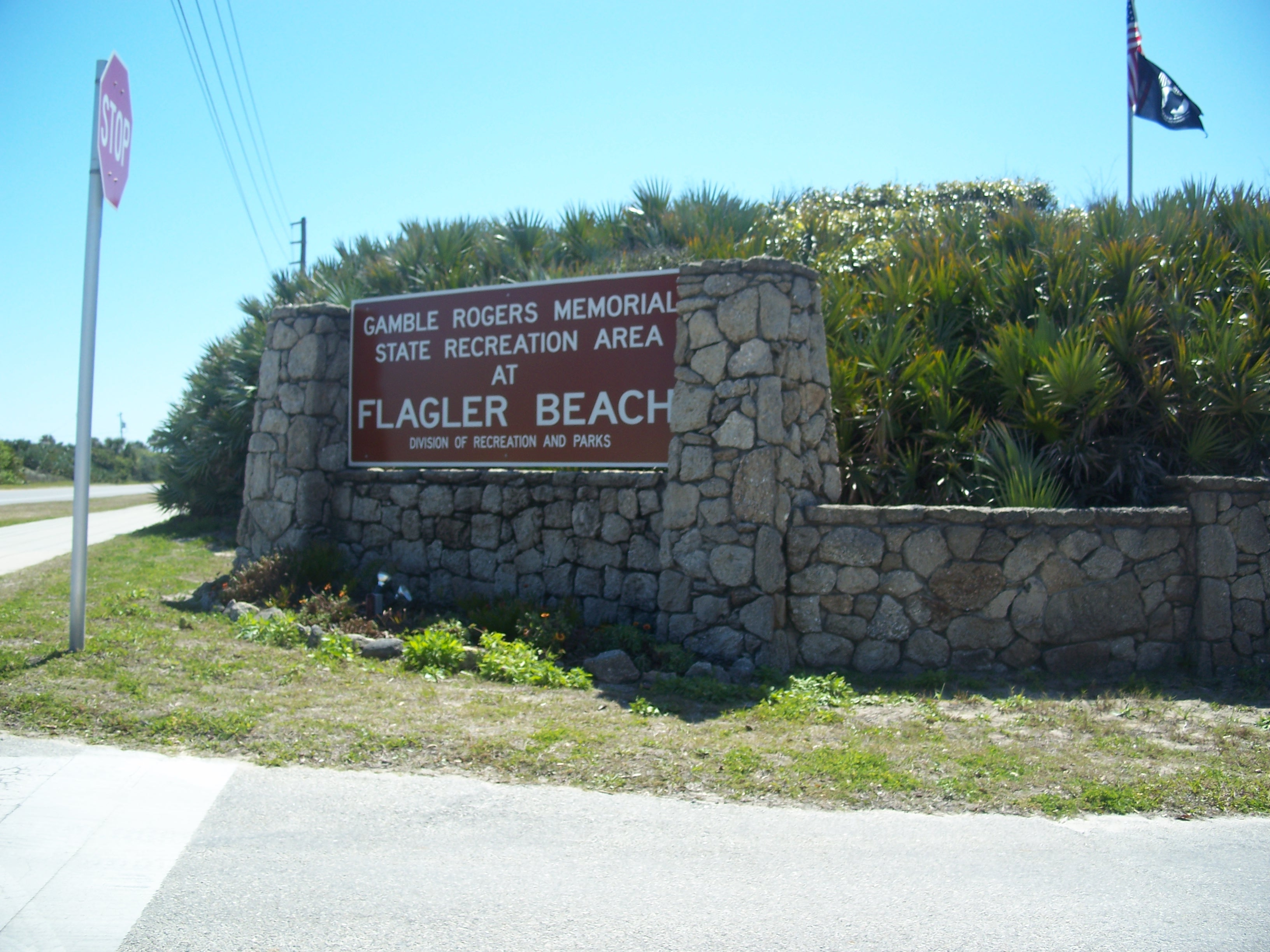
Sign

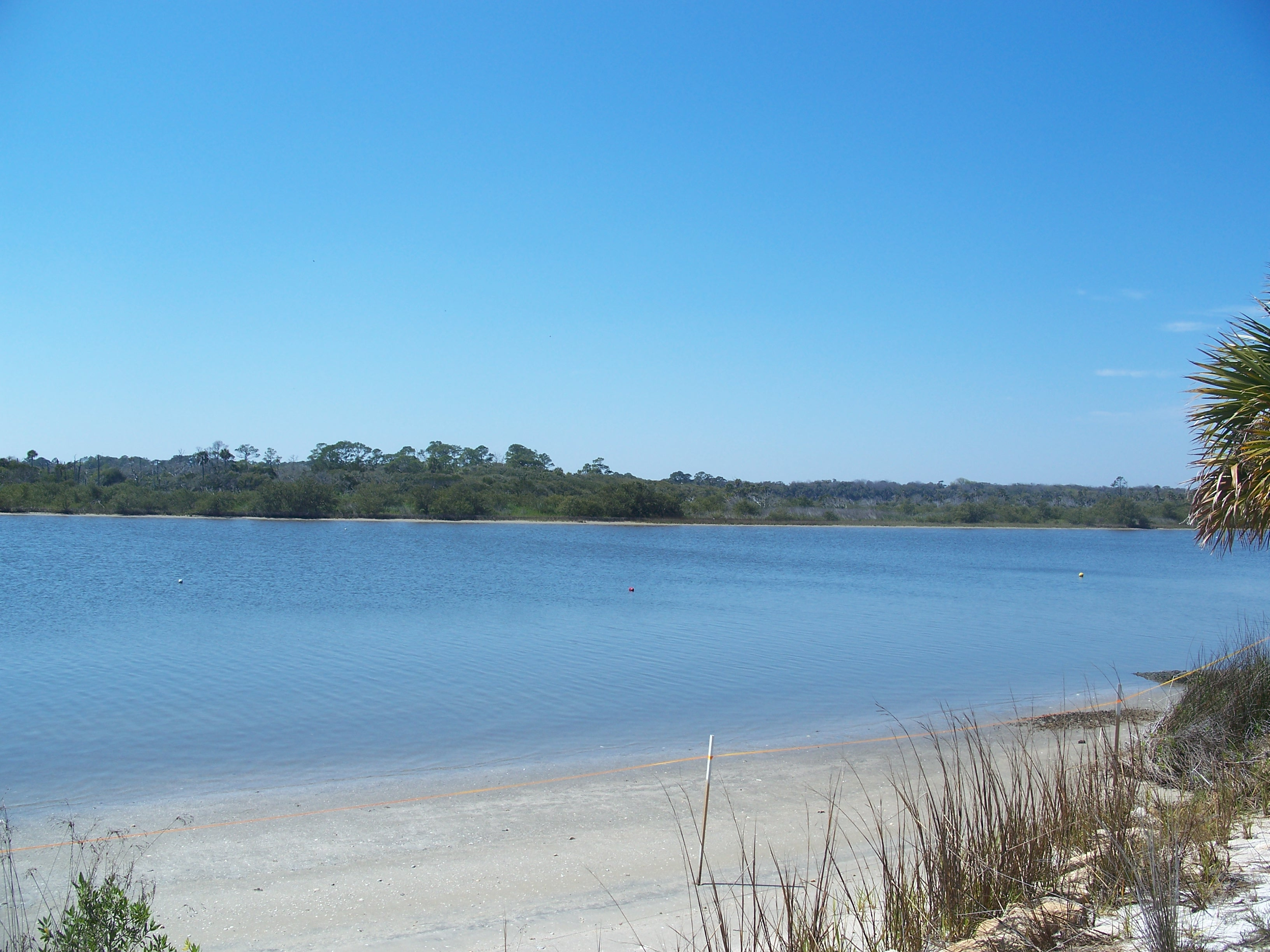
View of the Intracoastal Waterway
