= Don Sanders =

American singer-songwriter (1943-2018)

Don Sanders (October 1, 1943 – July 21, 2018) was an American singer-songwriter from Houston, Texas. Due to his unique blend of storytelling and songwriting he was sometimes called a "folk humorist." Throughout the years he shared the stage with Lyle Lovett, Nanci Griffith, Lightnin' Hopkins, Vince Bell and Janis Joplin. Sanders was an educator, a musician, a one-time founder of an independent record label, a founding member of KPFT radio, and a writer.

He had the nickname "Mayor of Montrose".

== Early music and career ==
At the start of his career in the mid-1960s, Sanders' style of whimsical, individualistic songs made him a celebrated fixture on the Houston folk music scene.

Sanders began composing music around 1963, when he was a student at the University of Houston. When he graduated in 1965, Sanders decided to pursue music full-time. Soon, he was working and performing at Anderson Fair Retail Restaurant, Liberty Hall, Sand Mountain Coffee House, The Old Quarter, and a number of other venues around town. It was in these places Sanders began to associate with peers such as Jerry Jeff Walker, Guy Clark, and the legendary Townes Van Zandt. In the 1970s–1980s, Sanders took to the road, playing music at college campuses across the country.

Sanders started his own label, Mean N' Low Records, in 1972 so that he could release his own albums, a self-titled 12", "Extended Play," and "Limited Edition." Around this time he also assumed the role of "Zany Donny Jo Deejay" on the Houston radio station KPFT, where he put on a weekly radio show that featured 'musical comedy songs', his own music, and songs produced by his peers.

In the spring of 1977 Sanders participated in an artist-in-residence program funded by the National Endowment for the Arts and the Texas Commission on the Arts. Through this program Sanders taught at the Gatesville School for Boys and a Houston area high school, teaching the creative concepts of music and songwriting to schoolkids. This shift in his career was rooted in a desire to make a more stable income, to benefit children as an educator, and to explore a new style of his own music that was "more musical and poetic."

== Later music and career ==
Sander's later albums include "El Mosquito in My Kitchen" (2006) and "Limelight" (2015). In 2010, Rock Romano a.k.a. Dr. Rockit, owner of Red Shack Studios, helped Sanders digitize many of his works recorded on vinyl into versions now available on large-scale streaming sites such as Spotify.

For a long time, Sanders was a recognizable face onstage at the Kerrville Folk Festival, another influential hub for exchange between musicians in and outside of Texas. There was an intricate network of influence that existed between the work of artists such as Sanders, who stayed fairly local for most of his performing life, and those such as Lovett, who went onto stardom. An interview with Sanders and one of his songs, "On the Southern Coast of France" are featured in a documentary about Anderson Fair Retail Restaurant, For The Sake of the Song.

In the 2000s, Don returned to the world of education as a storyteller-performer. He is known for his story and song performances in hundreds of schools, theaters, and festivals throughout the Southwest. His performances combine bilingual education (Spanish and English), social and historical connections, and language arts curriculum (folklore, story, rhyme).
