= Phoenix (Vince Bell album) =

Studio album by Vince Bell
- Released: July 16, 1994
- Genre: Alternative country
- Label: Watermelon Records, Inc.
- Producer: Bob Neuwirth

Vince Bell chronology
Phoenix (1994)	Texas Plates (1999)

Phoenix is the first album by the singer-songwriter Vince Bell and was released on July 16, 1994, almost twelve years after Bell was severely injured by a drunk driver. The album landed high on many critics' best-of-the-year lists for 1994.

== Track listing ==
1. "Frankenstein"
2. "The Beast"
3. "Hard Road"
4. "Troubletown"
5. "Sun & Moon & Stars"
6. "Mirror, Mirror"
7. "I've Had Enough"
8. "Girl Who Never Saw a Mountain"
9. "Woman of the Phoenix"
10. "Just Because"
11. "No Tomorrow"

== Personnel ==
- Vince Bell – vocal, guitar
- Geoff Muldaur – mandolin, banjo, guitars
- Fritz Richmond – washtub bass
- Bill Rich – bass
- David Mansfield – violin
- Mickey Raphael – harmonica
- Stephen Bruton – guitars, mandolin
- John Cale – piano
- Jim Justice – violin
- Paul Logan – bass
- Victoria Williams – guest vocalist
- Lyle Lovett – guest vocalist

== Production ==
- Producer: Bob Neuwirth
