= James Szalapski =

American film director

James Szalapski (October 4, 1945 – September 6, 2000) was a professional screenwriter, cinematographer, producer, and director, born in St. Paul, Minnesota, and worked in New York City. His works include many documentaries, most notably Heartworn Highways, a 1976 documentary on several country music artists. He was the principal live-action special effects cinematographer for R/Greenberg Associates years starting in 1979. His notable work includes the classic Alien theatrical teaser (1979), the after-life scene in the 1980 film Resurrection, the opening title sequence in The World According to Garp (1982), and scenes from Ladyhawke working with Vittorio Storaro (1985).

He is survived by his wife Deirdre, his brother Kevin and his nephew Patrick.
