= Live in Texas (Vince Bell album) =

Live album by Vince Bell
- Released: October 2001
- Genre: Alternative country
- Label: vincebell.com

Vince Bell chronology
Texas Plates (1999)	Live in Texas (2001)	Recado (2007)

Live in Texas is the third album by Vince Bell. It was released in October 2001 on the singer-songwriter's own label, vincebell.com. As the title suggests, the album was recorded live at a Texas Nights North house concert in Dallas, Texas, on May 11, 2001. Bell offered no apology for his DIY effort (his first after Texas Plates, which had been issued on Paladin Records/Warner Bros.), saying upon the album's release about the burgeoning opportunities offered by CD-Rs: "If you've got something to say, or you play it just like you talk it, there's no better way for an author of music/lyric to keep the art form alive. You shouldn't have to ask permission of any record label to put your foot in it. After a treasured saying, 'If you are led by authority, you are led by a halter.'"

== Track listing ==
1. "Say That You Will"
2. "Let You Leave"
3. "Folk Song"
4. "The Other Side"
5. "Queen Street"
6. "Game of Chances"
7. "Sundown in Her Eyes"
8. "Local Charm"
9. "Slowly"
10. "Tokyo"
11. "Two Lane Blacktop"

=== Song credits ===
- "Say That You Will," "Slowly": Vince Bell, TVB Publishing, Bug Music, Inc., Black Coffee Music
- "Let You Leave," Queen Street," "Game of Chances," "Local Charm": TVB Publishing, Bug Music, Inc.
- "Folk Song," "The Other Side," "Sundown in Her Eyes": Vince Bell, TVB Publishing
- "Tokyo": Bruce Cockburn
- "Two Lane Blacktop": David Rodriguez

== Personnel ==
- Vince Bell – Vince Bell model Pawless mesquite dreadnought guitar, vocals
- Cam King – electric guitars
- Chris Eiffert – engineering
- Elijah Shaw – engineering, mixing, mastering
