= Rockefeller's =

Live music venue in Houston, Texas

- Address: 3620 Washington Ave; Houston, TX 77007-5939
- Location: Rice Military
- Coordinates: 29°46′11″N 95°23′48.5″W
- Owner: Hank Zwirek
- Capacity: 410 (general admission); 250 (reserved)

Construction
- Opened: August 27, 1979
- Closed: 1997-2016
- Reopened: September 9, 2016

Website
- Venue Website

Rockefeller's is a live music venue located in Houston, Texas.

== History ==
In 1979, Sanford and Susan Criner opened Rockefeller's to serve as a performance space for Houston's music scene. The Criners wanted to create a place where both local talent and already-established acts could play to Houston crowds. They already owned a former bank building, designed by Joseph Finger in 1925; they turned it into a club and used proceeds to renovate the space.

The building's architecture lent itself to a unique performance space. The old bank vault became an artists’ dressing room, while the large lobby created a distinct acoustic atmosphere. Seating was two-tiered, with some of the audience on the ground level and some in balconies that nearly extended over the stage. The venue could seat about 325 guests.

Rockefeller's closed as a public venue in 1997. The owners of Star Pizza purchased the building and it was a private event and wedding space from 1999 to 2014. In 2016, concerts returned to Rockefeller's for the first time in nearly 20 years.

== Noted performers ==
List of noted performers during the 80s and 90s:

- Angela Bofill
- B.B. King
- Bo Diddley
- Bonnie Raitt
- Carl Perkins
- Cheap Trick
- Chet Atkins
- Count Basie
- Dixie Chicks
- Dizzy Gillespie
- Don McLean
- Stevie Ray Vaughan and Double Trouble
- Dwight Yoakam
- Ella Fitzgerald
- Emmylou Harris
- The Fabulous Thunderbirds
- Fats Domino
- Garth Brooks
- James Brown
- Janis Ian
- Jesse Colin Young
- Jerry Lee Lewis
- Joe Ely
- John Lee Hooker
- John Hiatt
- Jorma Kaukonen
- Lyle Lovett
- k.d. lang and The Reclines
- Kris Kristofferson
- Merle Haggard
- Muddy Waters
- Pieces of a Dream
- Radiohead
- Ray Charles
- Red Hot Chili Peppers
- Riders in the Sky
- Roy Orbison
- Tina Turner
- Tito Puente
- Waylon Jennings
- Widespread Panic
