= Liberty Hall (Houston, Texas) =

Former live music venue in Houston, Texas

- Interactive map of Liberty Hall
- Address: 1610 Chenevert
- Location: Houston, Texas
- Owner: Mike Condray, Lynda Herrera, and Ryan Trimble
- Capacity: 450

Construction
- Opened: 1971
- Closed: 1978

Website
- www.facebook.com/LibertyHallHoustonTx/

Liberty Hall was a venue located in downtown Houston, Texas from 1971 to 1978. It was located where a parking lot two blocks away from the Toyota Center is currently. Liberty Hall was owned and operated by Mike Condray, Lynda Herrera, Ryan Trimble, Ken Fontenot, and Roberto Gonzales. It hosted a wide variety of performers, including Bruce Springsteen, ZZ Top, and Journey. It is remembered for its low admittance prices of sometimes only two dollars for nationally known entertainers.

== History ==
Before Liberty Hall, Condray and George Banks, the future graphic illustrator of Liberty Hall posters, opened Jubilee Hall which became the Family Hand, a restaurant and entertainment venue. The restaurant was known for its red beans and rice, prepared by Thera Neumann, the African-American female chef. When Condray began looking for a new location to open with Herrera and Trimble, Neumann found the building that would become Liberty Hall. The building was originally a church built in the 1940s and later became the American Legion Post 391. On March 4, 1971, it opened as Liberty Hall. Co-founder Herrera came up with the name. Neumann moved with the owners to Liberty Hall and continued to cook for the performances. The nightclub hosted musicians from the country, rock, zydeco, and blues genre. On Liberty Hall's opening night, the venue hosted the country rock musical Earl of Ruston. Soon after Earl of Ruston, Liberty Hall had a six-week-long blues show with musicians like Big Mama Thornton, Lightnin' Hopkins, and Freddie King. Hopkins became close friends with Trimble and performed multiple times at Liberty Hall by himself and with Mance Lipscomb.

The venue began to gain prominence in Houston. Springsteen mentions Liberty Hall in his song This Hard Land. KPFT and Liberty Hall worked together to produce live broadcasts of performers like Springsteen, Ramones, and Gram Parsons.

Besides the many musicians that performed at Liberty Hall, the venue hosted plays and comedy performances. Cheech and Chong performed for a completely sold out four-night stand for two dollars a ticket. Cheech and Chong credit Liberty Hall for their success. Liberty Hall also hosted rock opera director C. C. Courtney's play One Flew Over the Cuckoo's Nest from March 23 to April 22, 1972. At the time, it was the longest running play in the history of Houston. Courtney made a deal with Liberty Hall to continue directing his rock operas at the venue. His other work performed at Liberty Hall in 1972 was Ripped and Wrinkled.

Liberty Hall did not extend only to music and entertainment performances. The venue held benefits for progressive candidates. On September 17, 1972, Liberty Hall hosted a rally for the "candidates of the people." The rally had a performance by the hard rock band Chocolate Glass. Many candidates attended and spoke at the event including Sissy Farenthold, Gertrude Barnstone, and Curtis Graves. Marvin Zindler, Deputy Sheriff at the time, also attended the event. Red beans and rice were sold for one dollar as a fundraiser. On September 20, 1972, Liberty hall hosted a beans and rice dinner benefit for George McGovern and his presidential campaign. In February 1973, Liberty Hall hosted the first annual convention of the National Women's Political Caucus with female leaders Gloria Steinem, Bella Abzug, and Betty Friedan. The convention had performances by Tracy Nelson and her band Mother Earth along with a New Orleans band called Flavor.

In 1975, Condray left Liberty Hall. Trimble believes Liberty Hall put on 300 to 400 shows a year until it closed in 1978 with a performance by Muddy Waters. The building that was once Liberty Hall became a Chinese film theater. Eventually, the building was demolished. Today, a parking lot near the Toyota Center sits where Liberty Hall once was.

== Design ==
The venue was relatively small, holding about 450 people. The stage and floors were wooden. The intimate setting allowed for good acoustics, different from popular arena-style venues at the time. Banks constructed the stage and balcony.
