= Vince Bell =

American singer-songwriter (born 1951)

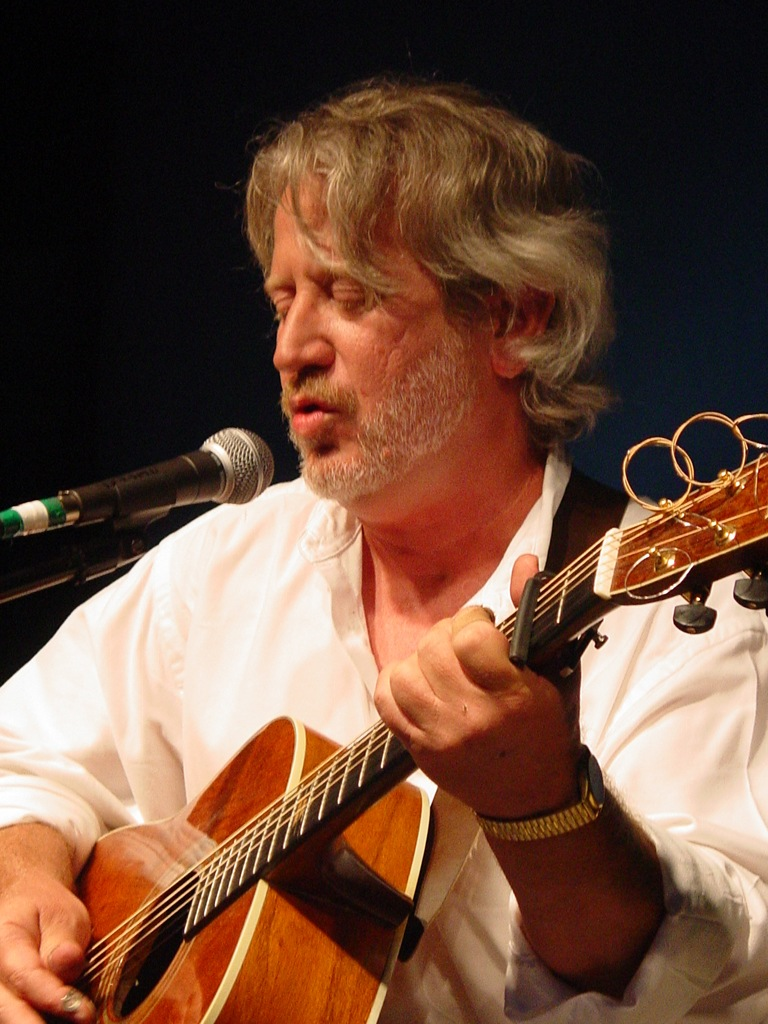
- Bell performing in 2008

Background information
- Born: Vince Bell; September 16, 1951 (age 75); Dallas, Texas, United States
- Genres: singer-songwriter, alternative country
- Occupations: Solo artist, songwriter
- Instruments: Singer, guitar
- Website: Vince Bell official site

Vince Bell (born September 16, 1951) is a Texas singer-songwriter who has appeared on the PBS television program Austin City Limits along with NPR broadcasts such as Mountain Stage, World Cafe and Morning Edition. His songs have been performed and recorded by Little Feat, Lyle Lovett and Nanci Griffith.

== Early career ==
During the early-1970s Bell became a fixture on the Lone Star music scene. In his hometown of Houston, Texas, Bell shared the stage of Anderson Fair and The Old Quarter nightclub with friends and musical influences Townes Van Zandt and Guy Clark, both of whom he later called his mentors. By the early-1980s, Bell had begun to carve out a regional reputation for himself. On December 21, 1982, Bell had finished up a day of recording his debut album with Stevie Ray Vaughan and Eric Johnson in Austin, Texas. He was driving home when he was hit by a drunk driver going upwards of 65 mph. Bell almost died from head and other severe injuries received during the wreck. His recovery lasted more than six years. Bell documented the traumatic event and its aftermath in his 1998 autobiography, One Man's Music. In 2004 Bell told an interviewer, "Learning the guitar the first time was a bitch. Learning the guitar the second time was cruel."

== Recordings ==
Bell's first album Phoenix was produced by Bob Neuwirth and released in 1994. The tracks were recorded in San Francisco with session musicians including Geoff Muldaur, Fritz Richmond, David Mansfield, Mickey Raphael and John Cale. Lyle Lovett and Victoria Williams contributed background vocals. Rick Mitchell of the Houston Chronicle praised the album, writing, "Phoenix adroitly mixes elements of folk, blues and country in an acoustic setting. But it's Bell's alternatingly oblique and soul-baring lyrics that make the album a captivating listen." In the New York Times, Neil Strauss wrote that the lyrics "were filled with images of misshapen monsters and twisted metal, paralysis and victory, loneliness and introspection".

Bell's second album Texas Plates was released by Paladin/Warner in 1999 but was not a commercial success. In 2001 Bell independently released Live in Texas and in 2007 he released Recado through SteadyBoy Records.

Produced by Bob Neuwirth, Dave Soldier, and Patrick Derivaz, Bell's 2018 Ojo features him doing spoken word and playing with a wide range of musicians including Pedro Cortes, Patrick Derivaz, Robert Dick, Ratzo B. Harris, David Mansfield, Valerie Dee Naranjo, Laura Cantrell. Renaud-Gabriel Pion, Rob Schwimmer, Dave Soldier, and Satoshi Takeishi.

== Discography ==
=== Albums ===
Year	Album	Label
1994	Phoenix	Watermelon
1999	Texas Plates	Paladin
2001	Live in Texas	VinceBell.com
2007	Recado	SteadyBoy/VinceBell.com
2018	Ojo	Mulatta Records
