= Anderson Fair Retail Restaurant =

Folk music venue

Coordinates: 29.7504°N 95.3912°W

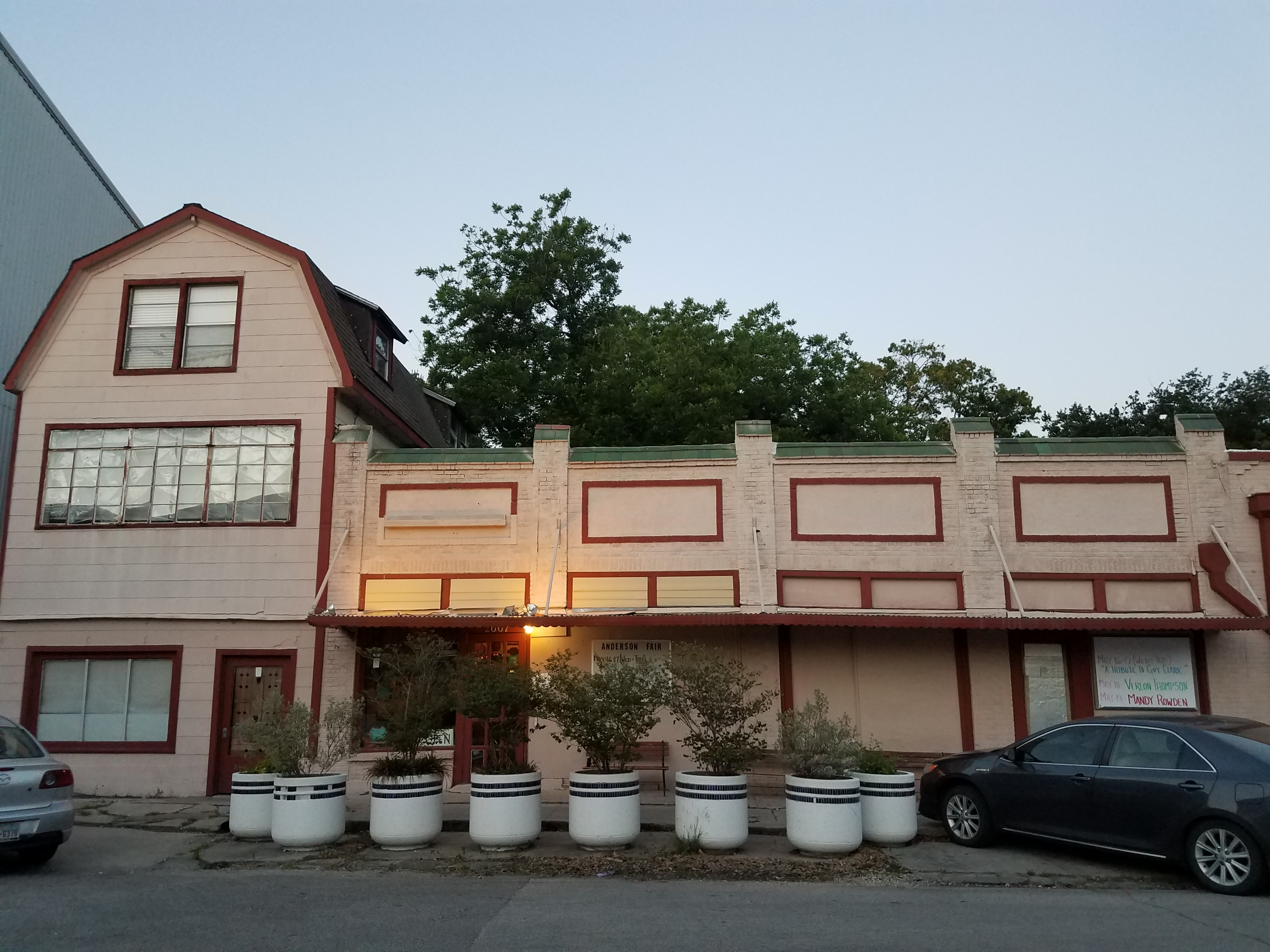
Anderson Fair Retail Restaurant, May 2018

Anderson Fair is one of the oldest folk and acoustic music venues in continuous operation in the United States. Located in the Montrose area of Houston, Texas, it has been called an "incubator" of musical talent for the folk scene, especially during the folk music heyday of the 1960s-1980s. Notable performers who credit Anderson Fair as an important part of their careers include Lyle Lovett, Nanci Griffith, Robert Earl Keen, Lucinda Williams and many more. Griffith's album One Fair Summer Evening was recorded at the venue. It has been featured in the documentary, For the Sake of the Song: The Story of Anderson Fair directed by Bruce Bryant and produced by Bryant and Jim Barham.

Anderson Fair Retail Restaurant
Address	2007 Grant Street
Location	Houston, TX
Opened	1969

== History ==
Anderson Fair was founded as a restaurant in 1969 by partners Marvin Anderson and Grey Fair. In the early days, patrons would flock to the Fair for a lunchtime meal such as spaghetti or tacos. The club was housed in the Montrose area of Houston which was, at that time, an enclave for artists, free-thinkers, and war protestors. As a result, it was not long before the Fair became a gathering place for musicians and artists from the community to come together and talk politics. By 1973, the crowd that frequented the barn-like building on Grant Street began to turn the lunch club's main focus towards live music. Gradually, the venue grew into a destination for singer-songwriters who were willing to perform for an attentive, albeit discerning, audience.

Anderson Fair puts a premium on music and original lyrics, above all else. Lyle Lovett is quoted as saying, "Nobody ever made money off of Anderson Fair." And club owner Tim Leatherwood has also said, "It's not a business, more like a social club." In the past, Anderson Fair has hosted annual block parties in order to raise funds for repairs to the building and for rent payments. Club operations depend on a volunteer staff paid only in tips, and the majority of proceeds from ticket sales go straight to the performers. The dedicated staff of volunteers oversee sales, the kitchen, the bar, and crowd control, for they have been known to politely ask members of the audience who speak during a musician's set to exit the listening room.

=== Ownership ===
In the early 1970s Anderson and Fair had moved on, and for the rest of the decade Anderson Fair was run by a co-operative legally known as The Blue Squirrel Corp. Although the co-op was founded by one man, Pat Pritchett, the club was at one time collectively owned by thirteen individuals and over the years, more than twenty-five people purchased shares in the Fair for as low as $250. Some with a controlling interest in the club included Franci Files Jarrad, Walter Spinks, and Roger Ruffcorn. The owner today is Tim Leatherwood.

== Design ==
Anderson Fair is a brick and wood building constructed in segments between the 1880s and 1930s. In the 1920s, Gen. Victor A. Barracco, a veteran of both World Wars and Anderson Fair's longtime landlord, built most of the three-story barnlike structure as a residence. Originally, founders Anderson and Fair purchased only a narrow room in part of the building, much of which was constructed using salvaged wood from the Brazos Hotel, which had been razed in the 1930s. Throughout the early 1970s, the site had no stage, and no PA. Over the years the club has gradually expanded to occupy the entire building. It now boasts a stage with professional lighting, a distortion-free sound system, and videography equipment for recording every performance.

== Notable performers ==
- Lyle Lovett
- Steven Fromholz
- Guy Clark
- Robert Earl Keen
- Nanci Griffith
- Lucinda Williams
- Vince Bell
- Don Sanders
- Townes van Zandt
- Slaid Cleaves
- Richard Dobson
- Ramblin' Jack Elliot
- Carolyn Hester
- Bill Staines
- Eric Taylor
- Dave van Ronk
- Adrian Legg
- Linda Lowe
- Steve Young
- Petesimple
