= Susan McKeown =

Irish folk singer, songwriter, and producer (born 1967)

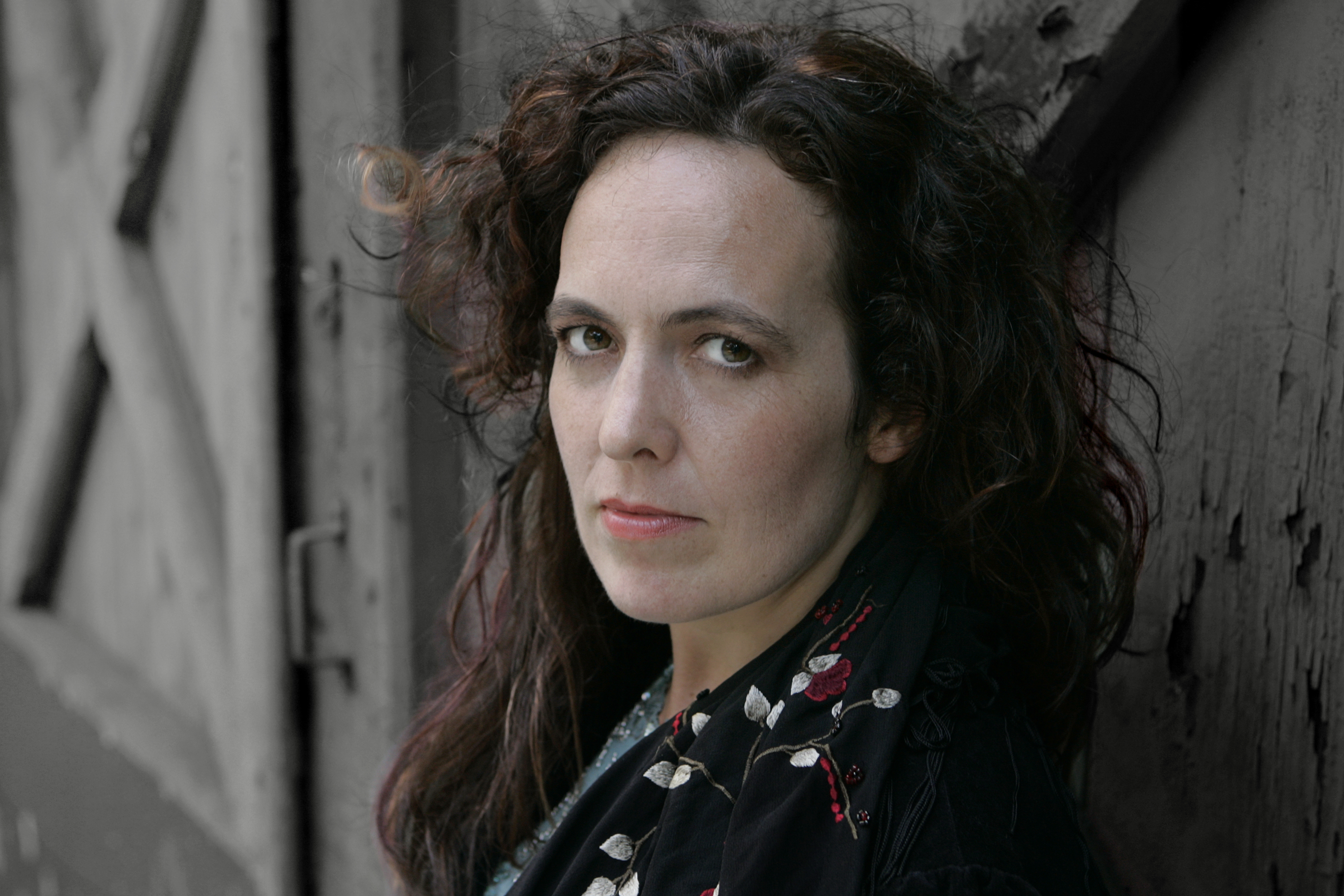
- McKeown c. 2005

Background information
- Born: Susan McKeown; February 6, 1967 (age 59); Dublin, Ireland
- Education: University College Dublin (B.A.)
- Genres: Folk; Celtic; Irish trad; rock and roll; world music
- Occupations: Singer; songwriter; producer; arranger; orchestrator
- Instruments: Vocals; piano; guitar; bodhrán
- Works: Discography
- Years active: 1989–present
- Labels: World Village; Green Linnet Records; Shout! Studios; Depth of Field; Tommy Boy Records; BMG Rights Management
- Award: Grammy Award for Best Contemporary World Music Album (2007)
- Website: susanmckeown.com

Susan McKeown (born February 6, 1967) is an Irish-American folk singer, songwriter, and producer. Dubbed the "Celtic High Priestess," she has contributed to more than seventy albums over a career spanning upwards of three decades. She won the 2007 Grammy Award for Best Contemporary World Music Album for Wonder Wheel with The Klezmatics.

Since 1989, she has served as the front woman of Susan McKeown & the Chanting House. Their 1996 album Bones garnered international recognition, with Time magazine remarking, "this is the kind of music that will link Ireland’s musical past with its future." Her 2004 album Sweet Liberty—a blend of Celtic folk with elements of Mexican mariachi and Malian Tuareg music—was nominated at the 2005 BBC Radio 2 Folk Awards. McKeown’s 2012 album Belong was a critical and commercial success, and its lead single, "Everything We Had Was Good," reached No. 1 on the U.S. Folk Singles Chart.

Throughout her career, McKeown has performed at numerous venues including the Glastonbury Festival, Carnegie Hall, the Brooklyn Academy of Music, the Hollywood Bowl, and the National Concert Hall. Her music has been featured on PBS, NPR, PRI, BBC, and RTÉ, as well as in ad campaigns for Audi, Jaguar, and Olay.

Alongside poet Paul Muldoon, she serves as co-artistic director of Feis Teamhra, an annual festival of poetry and music held at the Hill of Tara, an ancient ceremonial site in County Meath, Ireland.

== Early life and education ==
Susan McKeown was born on February 6, 1967, in Dublin, Ireland. The youngest of five children, she grew up in a musical household: her father worked as a food scientist, while her mother was a pianist and composer who fostered McKeown’s early interest in music. McKeown would later recall, “I was singing before I could speak because my mom had a Hammond organ at home and we were always surrounded by music."

At age fifteen, McKeown began studying classical voice with noted Irish soprano Veronica Dunne. While still in secondary school, she chose to forgo a potential career in opera in favour of folk music. She then began busking on Grafton Street performing with friends, including future Academy Award-winner Glen Hansard. McKeown matriculated to University College Dublin, earning a joint honours degree in English and Philosophy. During her studies she spent a summer in New York on a J-1 visa and became enamored with the East Village music scene.

== Susan McKeown & the Chanting House ==
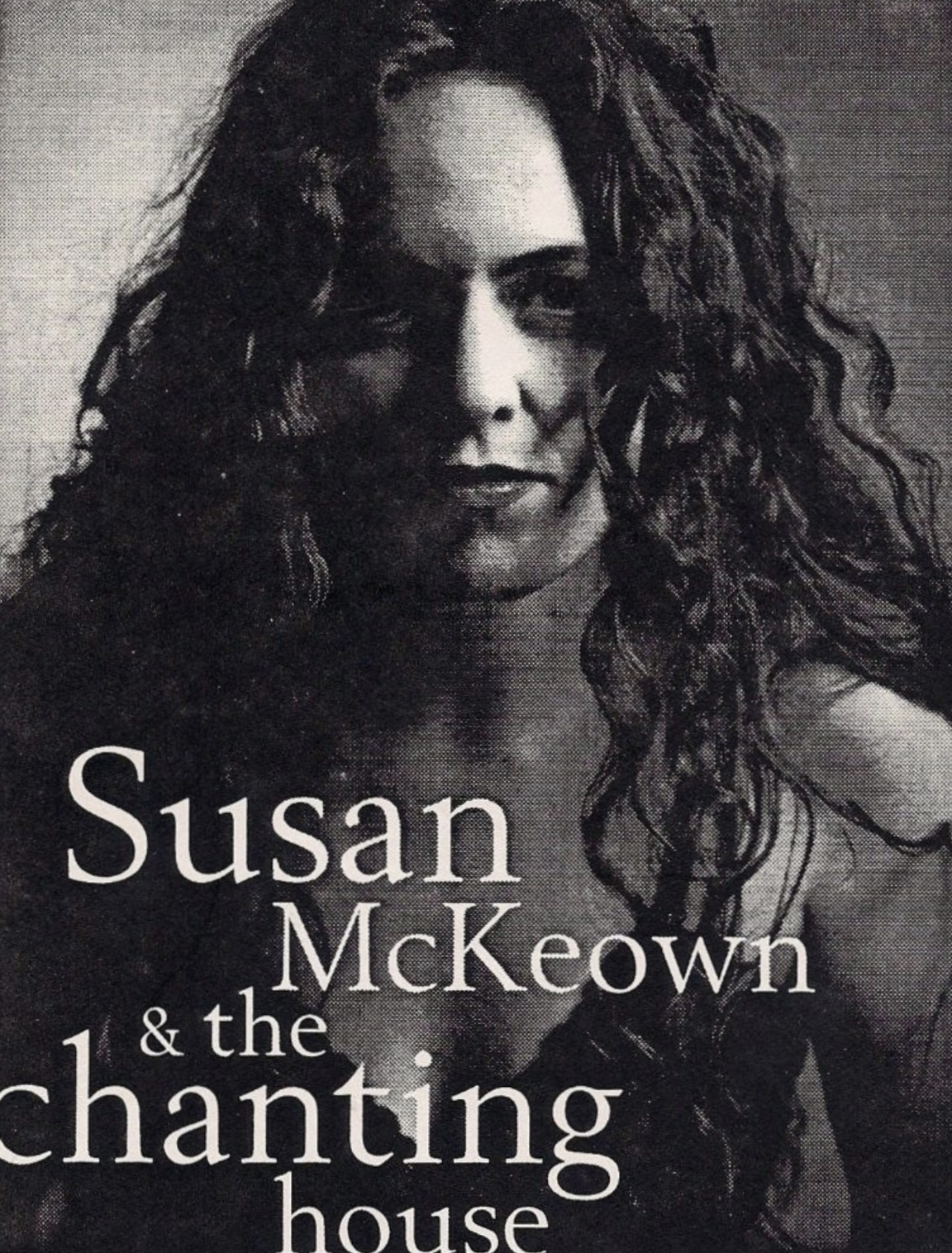
Susan McKeown & the Chanting House c. 1993

Together with John Doyle, McKeown co-founded the Chanting House in 1989. Initially performing as a duo, the band toured Europe with Donogh Hennessy and other musicians, playing original songs as well as traditional Irish music. The Chanting House released a self-titled debut mixtape in 1990, and were invited to perform on The Late Late Show and Nighthawks.

Later that same year, McKeown was awarded a bursary from the Arts Council of Ireland, as well as a scholarship to attend the American Musical and Dramatic Academy in New York City. McKeown then immigrated to the United States, with Doyle following suit shortly thereafter. The pair later joined forces with Seamus Egan and Eileen Ivers, rebranding as Susan McKeown & the Chanting House.

In the early 1990s, the band performed around New York's East Village, headlining numerous storied venues including Sin-é, Mercury Lounge, CBGB, The Bottom Line and the Bowery Ballroom. According to Colin Larkin, author of The Encyclopedia of Popular Music, Susan McKeown & the Chanting House completed a record-setting run of more than 30 sold-out performances at Club Fez during this period. In 1992 the band recorded a second self-released mixtape, The Chanting House: LIVE, and contributed the track "If I Were You" to the 1993 album Straight Outta Ireland for Scotti Brothers Records. Other band members from this period included Chris Cunningham, Michelle Kinney, Lindsey Horner and Joe Trump.

The Chanting House garnered further attention after signing with the indie record label 1-800-Prime-CD in the mid-1990s. The band released their debut studio album Bones on September 17, 1996 to widespread critical acclaim. The album features original songs inspired by the ancient Irish tradition of caoineadh (keening) as well as an original arrangement of Robert Burns' poem "Westlin' Winds", that was later covered by English rock band Fairport Convention on their 1999 album The Wood and the Wire. The song "Jericho" was subsequently included in the 1997 compilation album Women Of The World: Celtic II from Putumayo World Music, and featured in the 1999 BBC documentary series The Irish Empire. When commenting on the albums' genre in an interview with Billboard, McKeown noted “on Bones, I write songs using the rhythms of jigs and reels, but at the same time they are unmistakably rock songs. Traditional music is dear to me, but it’s up to the new generation to see how it’s carried down.”

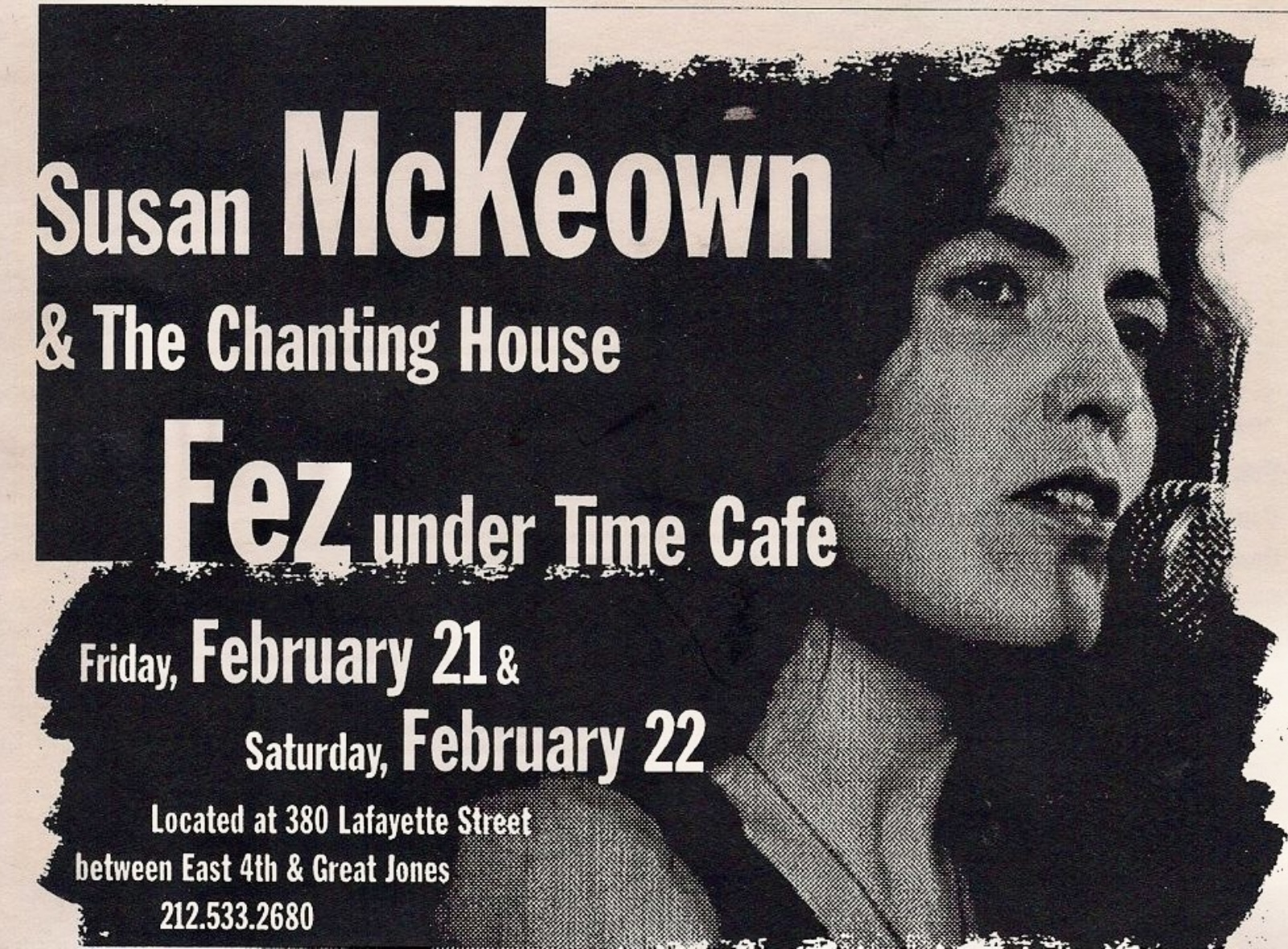
Susan McKeown & the Chanting House, Club Fez c. 1995

Bones was lauded by music critics, with particular praise for McKeown’s vocals, songwriting, and experimentation with genre. British publication Rhythm named Bones "one of the best releases of 1996," observing, "McKeown comes on the scene like a force of nature: a tide of incantory verse and a voice that slays demons... there’s a stateliness in her delivery that suggests she’s in midnight communion with the long-departed spirit of Sandy Denny." Rick Anderson, in a review for AllMusic awarded the album 4 stars, writing, "Susan McKeown has one of those voices that takes you by surprise-murmuring and indistinct one moment, then suddenly shuddering to a full-throated, quavering howl that manages always to teeter on the right side of pretty without ever letting you relax completely and get inattentive." Mike Boehm of the Los Angeles Times was equally enthusiastic, noting, "A soulful singing feminist, McKeown blends progressive Irish folk music with a harder-edged, pop-rock sensibility. Her album Bones is a stirring work of intense soul-searching."The Boston Globe wrote “equal parts folk-flavored songwriter and alternative rock chanteuse, Susan McKeown’s debut album Bones is arrestingly original.” While Michael Paulson of the New York Daily News noted "(Bones) intimate folk-rock songs, entwined with Irish instrumentation, have an earthy potency."

After touring on and off for six years, the band released their sophomore studio album Prophecy via Sheila-na-Gig Music on March 4, 2002. Much like its predecessor, the album garnered critical acclaim, with Siobhan Long of The Irish Times awarding the album 4 stars, noting, "McKeown exhibits damn fine, renaissance musicianship... Challenging and cerebral, Prophecy's 10 gemstone tracks will tap at your subconscious long after your first listen." Sarah McQuaid, in a review for Hot Press, offered similar praise, writing

McKeown’s last solo-album, Lowlands (2000), had critics falling over themselves to laud her return to traditional Irish material. Perversely, she’s answered their praise with an elaborately produced album of original songs, complete with electric guitars, bass, drums and more exotic instruments such as “spooky loops” and “mellotron. McKeown has a wonderfully rich voice, and she isn’t afraid to make use of its full range and vibrato – a refreshing change from the little-girl breathiness that’s dominated the airwaves of late. On her setting of Emily Dickinson’s ‘Because I could not stop for Death’, she swaps verses and harmonies with Natalie Merchant, who also contributes backing vocals to ‘River’.”

"Because I could not stop for Death" was subsequently listed in the "Top 20 Songs of Fate & Destiny" by The Guardian. "River" was later covered by Irish band Gráda on their 2007 album Cloudy Day Navigation.

== Solo career ==
Following the success of Bones, McKeown released a Christmas album, Through the Bitter Frost and Snow, with 1-800-Prime-CD and Broadcast Music, Inc. on October 14, 1997. Collaborating with primarily with American jazz double-bassist Lindsey Horner, the album features guest appearances from Jeff Berman, Michelle Kinney, Pete McCann, and Carol Sharar. Through the Bitter Frost & Snow was met with critical acclaim from various media outlets, including AllMusic, Rhythm, the Los Angeles Times, and The Washington Post, among others. While promoting the album, McKeown and Horner performed their version of Auld Lang Syne on the New Year’s Eve broadcast of NPR’s All Things Considered.

Later that same year McKeown released Snakes, her debut solo EP with 1-800 Prime CD. Featuring songs from her previous collaborative projects, Bones with the Chanting House and Through the Bitter Frost and Snow with Lindsey Horner, Snakes was released on November 1, 1997. Produced by McKeown, Horner, and Jimi Zhivago, the EP contains four tracks: "Snakes/Mná na hÉireann" (radio version), "Winter King", "Daddy's Little Girl", and "Snakes/Mná na hÉireann" (album version). Mike Boehm of the Los Angeles Times deemed the EP's titular track a "Rosanne Cash-style folk-pop anthem." The following month McKeown contributed two tracks to The Soul of Christmas: A Celtic Music Celebration, a compilation holiday album with Tommy Boy Records. Produced by New York Times bestselling author Thomas Moore, the album also features appearances from Cathie Ryan, Johnny Cunningham, Mary Fahl, and Kathy Mattea. Upon its release, the album was accompanied by a PBS Pledge Week Christmas Special of the same name. Hosted by Martin Sheen, and featuring the album's primary vocalists, the special aired daily from December 6–14, 1997.The Soul of Christmas: A Celtic Music Celebration was subsequently released for purchase on VHS via GlobalVision.

McKeown released Bushes & Briars, her first solo album of Celtic music, on February 3, 1998 with Alula Records. Produced by McKeown, Jamshied Sharifi, and Akira Satake, Bushes & Briars features guest appearances from Andy Irvine, Chris Speed, Greg Anderson, Jerry O'Sullivan, Skúli Sverrisson, and Séamus Egan. Buhses & Briars was lauded by critics. Rick Anderson, in a review for AllMusic awarded the album 4.5 stars, writing:

On Bushes & Briars, Susan McKeown brings her eloquent and haunting voice—as well as the instrumental talents of a distinguished cast of supporting musicians—to bear on a set of traditional Celtic and British songs. Most of her accompanists are Irish musicians, but the arrangements are anything but traditional: McKeown sings "In London So Fair" over a shimmery bed of looped whistles and mandolins; "Bonny Boy" is delivered a cappella in a controlled voice that hints at an underlying frenzy of rage and sexual frustration; and her accompaniment on "The Mountain Streams Where the Moorcocks Crow" consists entirely of tabla, tambura and low whistle—a truly bizarre instrumentation that fits so perfectly with her quiet, resigned delivery that you may not even notice its strangeness. McKeown has taken an ancient repertoire and made it entirely new and her own, with wonderful results.

Norman Weinstein, in a review for The Christian Science Monitor, was equally effusive, noting, "The most strikingly original contemporary woman singer working this Celtic vein is Susan McKeown. Her new CD on the Alula label, Bushes & Briars, is a triumph." Bushes & Briars received the 1998 Best Celtic Album Award from Crossroads Magazine. Upon hearing the record, American singer-songwriter Natalie Merchant invited McKeown to perform two duets on the PBS television series Sessions at West 54th. McKeown subsequently joined Merchant as a support act on 1999 tour, and appeared in the concert film Natalie Merchant: Live in Concert, recorded at the Neil Simon Theatre on Broadway.

McKeown released her second album-length collaboration with Lindsey Horner, Mighty Rain through Depth of Field on October 20, 1998. Produced by Bobby Previte, McKeown and Horner, Mighty Rain features a mixture of original compositions, covers, and traditional folk songs. Retroactively deemed an "overlooked gem in the output of these two genre-spanning artists." On this album, every sound heard is played by either McKeown or Horner, spanning acoustic bass, bass guitar, piano, whistles, bass clarinet, bodhrán, and shakers. The album features covers of two Bob Dylan songs, "If Not for You" and "Dark Eyes," as well as a musical adaptation of the Lucille Clifton poem "Let there be new flowering." That same year, McKeown contributed tracks three compilation albums: Celtic Heartbeat: A Winter's Tale with Celtic Music, Colors Of The World - Celtic with Alula Records, and The Song Poets with 1-800 Prime CD. In November 1998, McKeown appeared in a tribute concert for Sandy Denny, lead singer of the British folk rock band Fairport Convention, at St. Ann's Warehouse in Brooklyn, New York. The lineup included Darius Rucker, Robyn Hitchcock, and Mike Mills. Reporting on the concert, New York Newsday observed that "McKeown nearly walked away with her stunning rendition; the effect was electric," while Rolling Stone wrote that "McKeown grabbed both song and audience by the throat, dragged them through heaven and hell and back again, and left the stage to the loudest applause heard all evening."

McKeown released Mother: Songs Celebrating Mothers & Motherhood with Cathie Ryan and Robin Spielberg on March 23, 1999 through North Star Music. Produced by McKeown, Ryan, and Spielberg, Mother features Charae Krueger, Gerry Leonard, Gerry O'Beirne, Jeff Berman, Johnny Cunningham, and Áine Minogue. McKeown, Ryan, and Spielberg first met working on The Soul of Christmas: A Celtic Music Celebration. While filming the accompanying television special, the trio hatched the idea for a "collaborative album of songs celebrating mothers and motherhood." Mother was met with mixed to positive reviews from music critics. While promoting the album, McKeown, Ryan, and Spielberg were featured on The Early Show's Mother's Day Special, airing May 5th, 1999 on CBS. That same year, McKeown contributed tracks to two compilation albums: The Most Beautiful Melodies Of Irish Music with Celtophile Records, and At Home for the Holidays with Folk Next Door.

McKeown released the album Lowlands through Green Linnet Records on September 26, 2000. Billed as the singers' "largest musical project to date," the album features over twenty-five guest musicians from Ireland, England, the United States, Iceland, Norway, Mali, India, and China. Produced by McKeown, the wide array of guest artists includes Malian griot Mamadou Diabaté, Scottish cellist Johnny Cunningham, American flutist Joanie Madden, and the Irish band Lúnasa. Lowlands received widespread critical acclaim from various trade publications, including AllMusic, Q, and Pulse!, among others. In a review for the former, music critic Rick Anderson award the album 5 stars, writing, "Susan McKeown is an Irish folk musician with an unusually diverse resume. She has made albums of original music and albums of traditional songs, including a stunning collection of seasonal tunes entitled Through the Bitter Frost and Snow. She has collaborated with numerous musicians from traditions both within and without the Celtic the world, and her music has been used in TV commercials for products as diverse as facial cream and automobiles. At this point, the only really surprising thing she could have done would have been to make a primarily traditional Irish album, which is exactly what she's done with the beautiful Lowlands… Highlights include the slight flamenco-flavored "The Dark Haired Girl" (An Nighean Dudh) and the anguished, a cappella “Dark Horse on the Wind.” Highly recommended." In support of the album, McKeown played the 2000 Glastonbury Festival in Somerset, England, in a line-up including Coldplay, Saint Etienne, and The Dandy Warhols. British music publication Q Magazine later deemed McKeown "the surprise hit of the 2000 festival." The following year she embarked on an international tour of the United States, United Kingdom, and Ireland to further support the album.

The following year, McKeown released A Winter Talisman through Sheila-na-Gig on December 19, 2001. A collaborative project with Scottish fiddle player, Johnny Cunningham the album featured a wide variety of non-traditional holiday themed music. The album was met with critical acclaim, receiving 5 stars from AllMusic. In a review for Goldmine, Bruce Sylvester praised the album, writing, "beautifully recorded with the sweet sounds of vocals, fiddle and guitar, the album evokes the feel of a winter's night around the fire with some good friends, some fine songs and stories, some great laughs and a peaceful journey home. As the glorious colours of autumn fade into the stark beauty of a silvery winter, friends and family gather together around the fire. Songs and stories are exchanged and shared tears and laughter become a powerful talisman against the cold darkness ahead." Michael Henningsen, in a review for ALIBI Music was equally enthusiastic, writing, "Celtic folk songs in English and captivating Gaelic, infused throughout with Cunningham's wry wit, poetic verse and monumental fiddling." While David Malachowski in a review for the Daily Freeman observed "McKeown needs only her powerful pipes and clever way with phrasing to make a song her own. Not content to be pigeonholed in one form, she jumps around genres at a whim, keeping us guessing where she’ll go next. One thing for certain, it will be really good." That same year, McKeown contributed tracks to two compilation albums: Now and Tomorrow through Legacy Recordings, and The Best of Sessions at West 54th through Sony Records.

McKeown released the album Sweet Liberty through World Village on April 13, 2004. Produced by McKeown, the album features a variety of musical influences from around the globe, including Celtic folk, Mexican Mariachi, and Malian Tuareg music. Upon its release, Sweet Liberty was lauded various media outlets. In a review for AllMusic, William Ruhlmann awarded the album 4.5 stars, noting

Every song on Susan McKeown's album Sweet Liberty is credited to "Traditional" as author, which is frequently the case with her recordings. But McKeown's approach to this material, which she has gathered from friends and from old books and recordings (as recounted in her notes), is often anything but traditional. "Oró Mhíle Grá (A Thousand Times My Love)" is a collaboration with Ensemble Tartit, a singing group from Mali, and its combination of Celtic and African elements makes for a stirring hybrid. On "Eggs in Her Basket," McKeown is accompanied by the Mexican group Mariachi Real de Mexico, again adding an unusual interpretation to a traditional Irish tune. But even when she is using musicians who perform in a more familiar Celtic style, such as Flook, the Anglo-Irish quartet that backs her on the leadoff track, "The Wee Birds All Have Come and Gone/Fisherman's," McKeown makes her versions of the songs distinctive by her combinations of different compositions, her striking arrangements, and her haunting voice... Sweet Liberty is traditional enough to please fans of Celtic music in its oldest forms, but it also suggests new directions for the style, and it serves as a showcase for an impressive singer."

Jon Pareles of The New York Times was equally enthusiastic, noting, "From the bottomless trove of Irish ballads, Susan McKeown's Sweet Liberty (World Village /Harmonia Mundi) comes up with songs of love, emigration and battle. Her voice has a mournful purity, and it's usually backed by pristinely folky guitar, fiddle and whistles. But she adds surprises: trip-hop electronics, mariachi trumpet and even Ensemble Tartit from Mali sharing a Gaelic call-and-response song that taunts, 'May a peeled potato with the moon in its middle choke you.'" Tad Hendrickson of The Wall Street Journal offered a more mixed review, writing, "Irish-born and New York-based singer Susan McKeown has made a name for herself over the last decade by interpreting Irish traditionals she's found through research or been taught by other musicians. Sometimes she can be a bit overambitious in her interpretations: thus we get a slightly disorienting version of the Irish song "Oró Mhíle Grá (A Thousand Times My Love)," which features McKeown fronting the Malian group Ensemble Tartit... Much of the rest of the album is beautifully understated Irish folk music driven with acoustic guitar, whistles, fiddle, and harmonium. The song "Eggs in Her Basket" was nominated for Best Original Track at the 2005 BBC Radio 2 Folk Awards, and was subsequently included on the award ceremonies' compilation album with Proper Records.

McKeown released Blackthorn: Irish Love Songs, her second album with World Village, on March 14, 2006. The album is known for its sensual arrangements of often melancholic songs, with tracks like "Oíche Fá Fhéil' Bríde" (On Brigid's Eve), "An Draighneán Donn" (The Blackthorn Tree), and "The Lass of Aughrim." While promoting the album, McKeown commented "“To me, these love songs maintain their relevance even today. They express emotions that we all understand. And while they might be old, the subject of love remains universal and contemporary to us all.” Blackthorn: Irish Love Songs was met with positive reviews from critics. William Ruhlmann, in a review for AllMusic, awarded the album 3.5 stars, writing, "McKeown has become something of a musicologist, and here she has done extensive research into traditional material; the songs are extensively annotated in the CD booklet, both by her and by Tom Munnelly, to trace the origins of the tunes back centuries. But McKeown is not simply an aural historian, as she does not hesitate to manipulate the music to her own ends... Blackthorn: Irish Love Songs is both an inventive work of scholarship and a musical treat." Geoffrey Himes of The Washington Post was also enthusiastic, noting, "McKeown's latest album is "Blackthorn: Irish Love Songs," a collection of traditional numbers, mostly in Gaelic, mostly slow and mostly laments of frustrated desire. Despite the language barrier, the languid tempos and minimalist arrangements, McKeown's lush, limpid tone and dramatic phrasing fills the old melodies with a yearning that can be recognized on any continent in any century." Additionally, Global Rhythm praised Blackthorn, writing, "Dublin's Susan McKeown is no ordinary Celtic singer. Her lilting vocals, whether in Irish or English, are full of personality… Blackthorn, her ninth and latest album is a triumph.” Notably, Blackthorn: Irish Love Songs featured arrangements by the late Irish singer Eithne Ní Uallacháin. McKeown released the concept album Singing in the Dark through Hibernia Records on October 30, 2010. According to McKeown, the album is "an exploration of "Creativity & Madness through the lyrics of great poets who were writing through the lens of depression, mania, or substance abuse." With an introduction by psychologist Kay Redfield Jamison, author of Touched with Fire: Manic-Depressive Illness and the Artistic Temperament, the album features poems by Lord Byron, Anne Sexton, Theodore Roethke, Gwendolyn Brooks, Nuala Ní Dhomhnaill, Gwyneth Lewis, Hayden Carruth, and James Clarence Mangan, as well as songs from John Dowland, Violeta Parra, and Leonard Cohen. Upon its release, Singing in the Dark received widespread critical acclaim from various media outlets, including The Irish Times, The New York Times, Time Out, El País, The Boston Globe, the Seattle Post-Intelligencer, New Sounds, WNYC, PopMatters, and IrishCentral, among others. Additionally, the Brooklyn Downtown Star included Singing in the Dark on their year-end list of "Top Ten Albums of 2010." Proceeds from the album were donated to the National Alliance on Mental Illness, Fountain House, Depression and Bipolar Support Alliance, and Glenn Close's "Bring Change 2 Ming."

Two years later, McKeown released the album Belong through Sheila-na-Gig and Fish Records on November 13, 2012. Produced by McKeown, the album features guest appearances from Declan O'Rourke and James Maddock. Other contributing musicians include Erik Della Penna, Erin McKeown, Doug Wieselman, Dirk Powell, Lindsey Horner, Allison Miller, Shahzad Ismaily, and Ray Santiago, among others. Belong peaked at No. 11 on the Billboard Americana/Folk Albums chart, while the single "Everything We Had Was Good" reached No. 1 on U.S. the Folk Singles chart. Like much of her previous discography, the album was lauded by music critics, who praised McKeown's vocals, songwriting, and musical arrangements. Siobhán Long, in a review for The Irish Times, awarded the album 4 stars, writing, "McKeown's voice, widely admired for its clarity and richness of tone, is getting better and better with age. Ever more open, more welcoming, it's as if she is coming closer to home and to herself, with each of her recent album releases. It's apt then, that this latest collection is titled Belong. Filled to bursting with songs that resemble diverse members of a single household, each one asserting its identity in suitably idiosyncratic fashion… Thought-provoking and joint-swivelling in equal measure: Belong is quite an achievement." Gwen Orel, in a review for the Irish Examiner, offered similar praise, remarking, "Belong is a mature CD that looks out as much as in, sharing observations of individuals and places, inviting the listener into its world." The song “No Jericho” was covered by Irish singer Mary Coughlan on her 2020 album Life Stories.

=== The Klezmatics ===
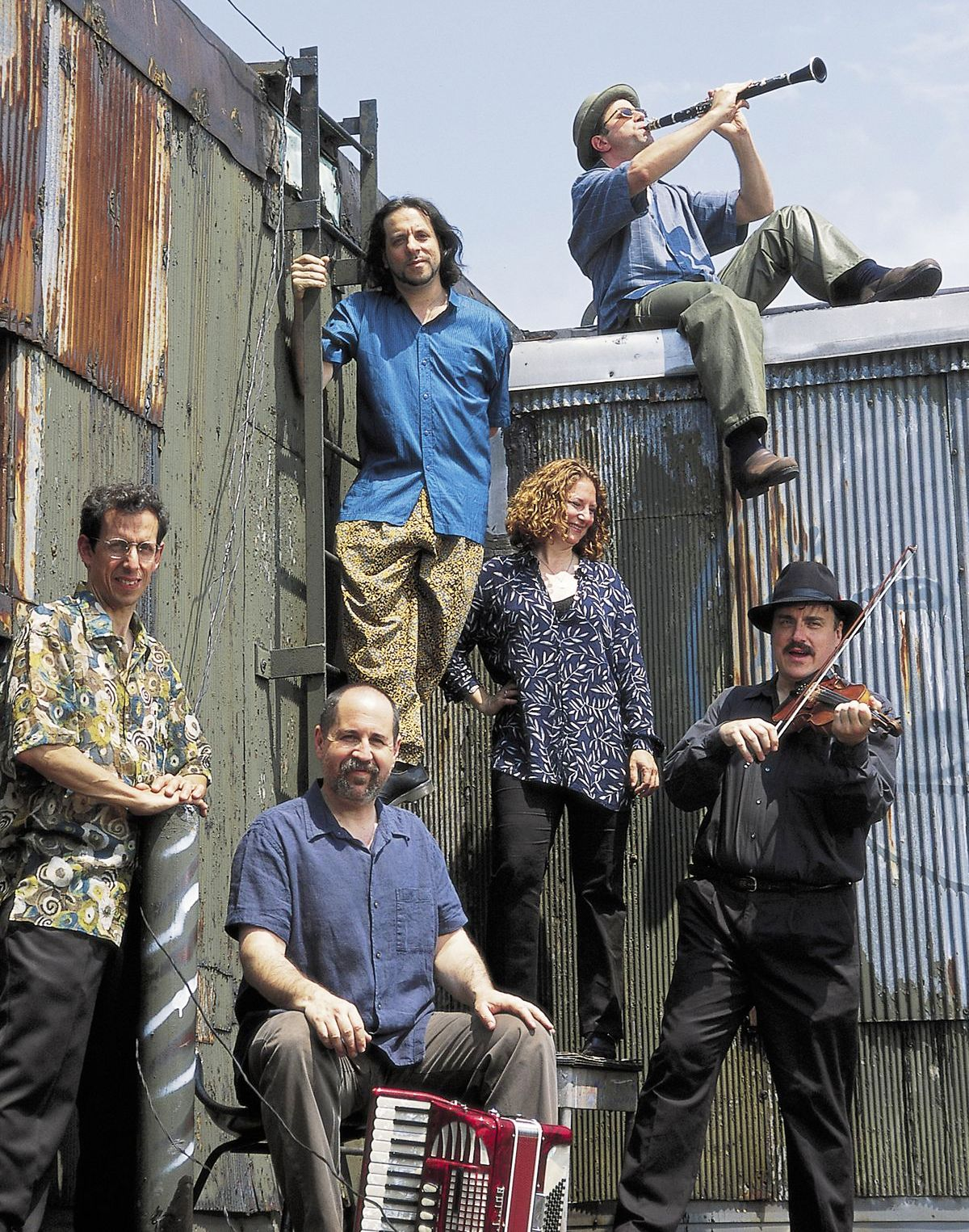
The Klezmatics mid-2000s lineup

McKeown's musical partnership with the famed klezmer band The Klezmatics began in December 2003, when she was invited by Arlo Guthrie to perform in The Jewish Songs of Woody Guthrie, a concert held at New York's 92nd Street Y. The songs featured in the program were written during Guthrie's years in Coney Island, where he lived with his second wife. Long forgotten in Guthrie's archives, the lyrics were rediscovered in 1998 by his daughter Nora Guthrie, who passed them on to The Klezmatics to set to music. The Klezmatics, along with McKeown, produced two albums of these previously unreleased songs. The first, Wonder Wheel, was released by Shout! Studios on July 25, 2006. The album proved both a critical and commercial success, topping the Billboard World Albums Chart and winning the 2007 Grammy Award for Best Contemporary World Music Album at the 49th Annual Grammy Awards. The second project, Woody Guthrie's Happy Joyous Hanukkah, also released by Shout! Studios on July 25, 2006, achieved similar critical and commercial success. McKeown later joined The Klezmatics on international and domestic tours in support of both albums. Together they played numerous venues, including Carnegie Hall, Lincoln Center for the Performing Arts, the Hollywood Bowl, and the Walt Disney Concert Hall, among others.

McKeown collaborated with the band for a third time on Saints & Tzadiks, released by World Village on August 11, 2009. Produced by McKeown and Sklamberg, the album features original arrangements of traditional Irish and Yiddish folk songs. Its title plays on a historical nickname for Ireland, "an island of Saints and Scholars," replacing "scholars" with "Tzadik", a term in Judaism denoting "highly learned and esteemed rabbinic leaders." Saints & Tzadiks received critical acclaim from various media outlets, including AllMusic, Blogcritics, and Green Man Review. To promote the album, McKeown and The Klezmatics embarked on an international tour that included the U.S., Germany, Switzerland, and Austria. McKeown collaborated with the band for a fourth time on the 2011 album Live at Town Hall, recorded during a concert performance in New York City. Much like its predecessors, Live at Town Hall was lauded by critics, with Robert Christgau awarding the album an "A", noting, "Recorded in 2007, this concert program performs roughly the same function as the band's 2008 album Tuml=Lebn. But personally, I'd rather hear these New Yorkers trying out their English than honoring tradition on a German best-of boasting "7 songs in Yiddish, 1 song in Yiddish/English + 8 instrumentals." Thus I gravitated to the four Woody Guthries and one Holly Near on the second disc, wished Susan McKeown would join the band already, welcomed cameo-ready Joshua Nelson, and was perfectly fine when half the Tuml=Lebn songs showed up."

=== Theatre ===
After graduating from the American Musical and Dramatic Academy, McKeown began working in New York theatre as both an actress and composer. In January 1992, she composed original music for the U.S. premiere of Tony Kavanagh's Down the Flats, in which she also appeared as the character Margaret. The play was produced Off-Broadway at the Irish Arts Center and directed by Nye Heron. The cast featured McKeown, Donald Creedon, Donal J. Sheehan, Caroline Winterson, Carmel O'Brien, Chris O'Neill, Marian Quinn, and Jim Smallhorne. In his review for The New York Times, Mel Gussow praised the ensemble of actors while critiquing the play’s script and staging. The following year, McKeown composed original music for the U.S. premiere of Honor Molloy's Maiden Voyages, in which she also appeared as the character Moira. The play was produced Off-Broadway by New Georges at Theatre Row. The production, directed by Jessica Bauman, featured an ensemble including McKeown, Susan Bernfield, Tobi Brydon, Robin Howard, Colleen McQuade, Bronagh Murphy, Marian Quinn, and Caroline Winterson. The Irish Times later described the play as “powerful, witty, and deeply moving.”

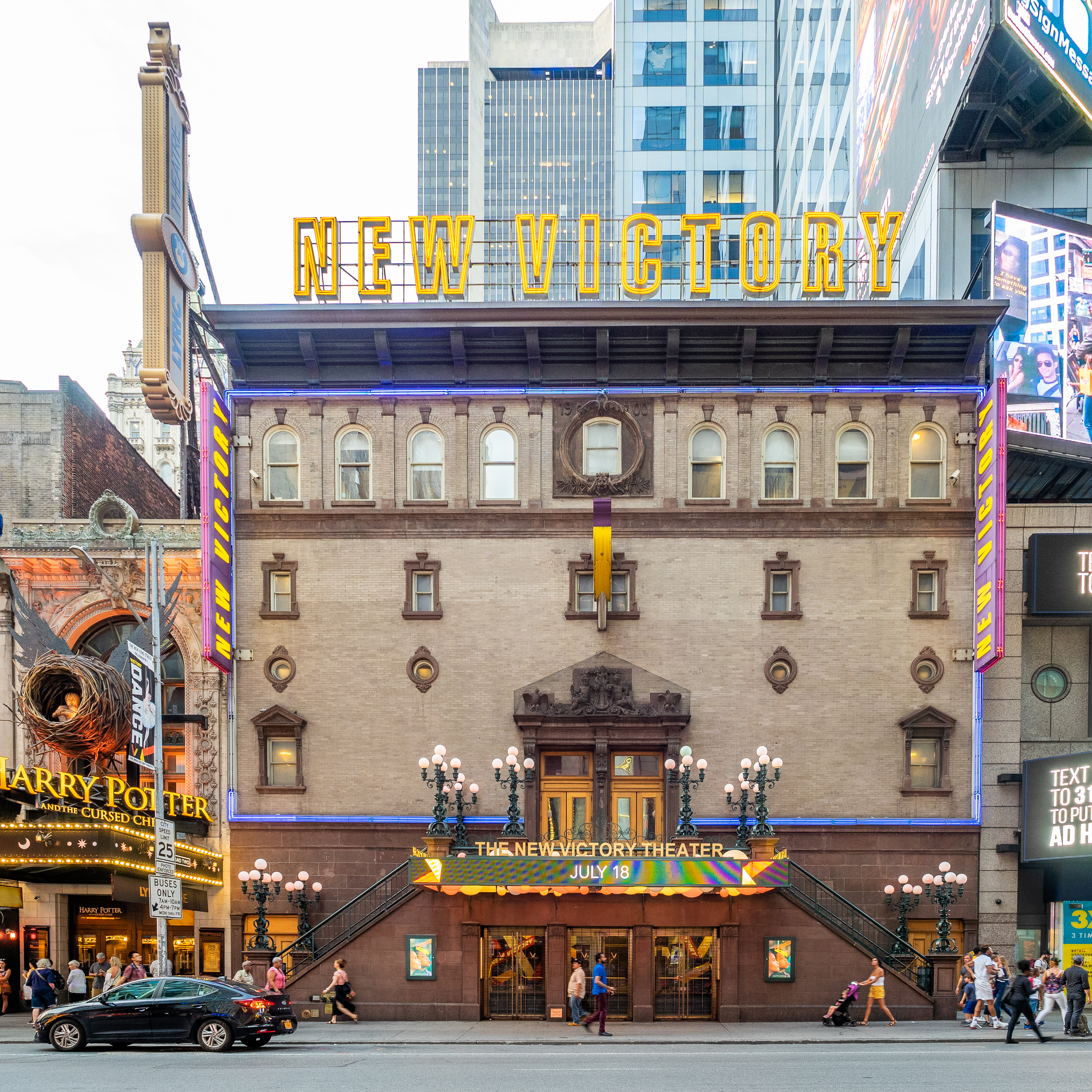
Peter & Wendy was produced Off-Broadway at the New Victory Theater in 1997. The play was later revived by the company in both 2002 and 2011.

After meeting in 1993, Scottish musician Johnny Cunningham asked McKeown to appear as the lead vocalist in a musical adaptation of J. M. Barrie's Peter Pan, which he was writing. Cunningham composed the musical’s score specifically for McKeown’s voice. His production, Peter & Wendy, was commissioned by the experimental theatre company Mabou Mines and premiered at the 1996 Spoleto Festival USA in Charleston, South Carolina. The following year, the musical premiered Off-Broadway at The Public Theater before transferring to the New Victory Theater. Peter & Wendy was a critical and commercial success, winning the 1997 Obie Award for Best Production. They then released an official cast album through Alula Records on October 1, 1997. Over the next fifteen years, it had subsequent productions at the Yale Repertory Theatre in New Haven, Connecticut; the Geffen Playhouse in Los Angeles, California; the La Jolla Playhouse in San Diego, California; the Berkeley Repertory Theatre in Berkeley, California; the Olympia Theatre in Dublin, Ireland; and the Royal Lyceum Theatre in Edinburgh, Scotland. Peter & Wendy was revived Off-Broadway at the New Victory Theater in 2002 and 2011. McKeown appeared as lead vocalist in all productions.

In 1996, McKeown composed and performed original music for Charles L. Mee’s solo show My House Was Collapsing Towards One Side at Dance Theatre Workshop in New York City. In 2001, she composed original music for the U.S. premiere of Marina Carr’s By the Bog of Cats, in which she also appeared as Josie Swanee. The play was produced by the San Jose Repertory Theatre and starred Academy Award winner Holly Hunter. In 2003, McKeown composed original music for the U.S. premiere of Rona Munro’s Susan Smith Blackburn Prize–winning play Bold Girls, produced Off-Broadway by the 29th Street Rep. In 2016, McKeown composed original music for the world premiere of Deirdre Kinahan’s Wild Sky at the Bewley’s Café Theatre in Dublin. In January 2020, she was commissioned to write and perform original songs for Honor Molloy’s Round Room, a sequel to their earlier collaboration, Maiden Voyages. Set in the corridors, back staircases, and wards of Dublin’s Rotunda Hospital, the oldest maternity hospital in the world, the play spans more than two centuries and tells the stories of “handywomen and harlots, the lamp tender, the airline hostess and the girl in the grain.” Round Room received a workshop production with Origin Theatre Company’s 1st Irish Theatre Festival, where it won the Best Play Award. Directed by Britt Berke, the ensemble featured Labhaoise Magee, Brenda Meaney, Rachel Pickup, Maeve Price, Zoe Watkins, and Aoife Williamson.

=== Film and television ===
Throughout her career, McKeown has appeared on various television and radio programs, including The Late Late Show (1990), Nighthawks (1990), All Things Considered (1996), Sessions at West 54th (1997), The Early Show (1999), A Prairie Home Companion (2000), Mountain Stage (2001), and The Infinite Mind (2003). In 2003, she contributed the score to Anne Makepeace’s documentary Robert Capa: In Love and War. The film premiered in competition at the 2003 Sundance Film Festival and later aired as part of the American Masters series on PBS. Robert Capa: In Love and War went on to win the 2003 Primetime Emmy Award for Outstanding Documentary or Nonfiction Series. McKeown also contributed to the soundtracks of the feature films My Brother’s War (2005) and 32A (2007). She made her screen acting debut in 2024, when filmmaker Marian Quinn cast her as Teresa in the feature film TWIG, a contemporary retelling of the Greek tragedy Antigone set in Dublin. TWIG served as the opening film of the 2024 Dublin International Film Festival.

== Personal life ==
A dual citizen of the United States and Ireland, McKeown lives between New York City and Dublin with her daughter, Róisín.

In 2010, McKeown devised and produced Songs from the East Village, a world music album featuring the students, parents, and staff of P.S. 19, the East Village Community School in Manhattan, where her daughter was a student. The album was featured on NPR and has raised more than thirty thousand dollars for the school’s Language & Arts programs.

In 2018, McKeown served as Music Network Ireland’s musician-in-residence at the Dún Laoghaire LexIcon Library, where she researched the lives of notable but historically overlooked Irish women from the county and composed and performed songs inspired by their stories.

In addition to her work in entertainment, McKeown is the founder and director of the Cuala Foundation, an international non-profit dedicated to building "social, economic, and cultural power for marginalized people." In 2021, she was contacted by members of the Afghan Girls Robotics Team. After the young women fled Afghanistan for Pakistan, McKeown worked with the Irish Department of Foreign Affairs to help secure special refugee status for them. Over the following two years, the Cuala Foundation raised funds from donors and directly supported the team’s resettlement in Ireland, as well as that of fifty-five of their family members in California.

== Awards ==
Year	Association	Category	Work	Result	Ref.
2018	IrishCentral	Anam Award	N/A	Won	
2012	Irish Arts Council	Bursary Award	Belong	Won	
2007	Grammy Awards	Best World Music Album	Wonder Wheel	Won	
2005	BBC Radio 2 Folk Awards	Best Track	Sweet Liberty	Nominated	
1998	Crossroad Magazine Awards	Best Celtic Album	Bushes & Briars	Won	
1990	Irish Arts Council	Bursary Award	N/A	Won	

== Discography ==
Title	Album details
The Chanting House	Released: 1990; Label: Self-released; Format: Cassette tape
The Chanting House: LIVE	Released: 1992; Label: Self-released; Format: Cassette tape
Bones	Released: September 17, 1996; Label: 1-800-Prime-CD; Format: Compact disc
Through the Bitter Frost and Snow	Released: October 14, 1997; Label: 1-800-Prime-CD; Format: Compact disc
Peter and Wendy	Released: October 21, 1997; Label: Alula Records; Format: Compact disc
Snakes	Released 1997; Label: 1-800-Prime-CD; Format: Compact disc
Bushes and Briars	Released: February 3, 1998; Label: Alula Records; Format: Compact disc
Mighty Rain	Released: October 20, 1998; Label: Depth of Field; Format: Compact disc
Mother	Released: March 23, 1999; Label: North Star Music; Format: Compact disc
Lowlands	Released: September 26, 2000; Label: Green Linnet Records; Format: Compact disc
A Winter Talisman	Released: December 19, 2001; Label: Sheila-na-Gig Music; Format: Compact disc
Sweet Liberty	Released: April 13, 2004; Label: World Village; Format: Compact disc
Prophecy	Released: January 25, 2006; Label: Sheila-na-Gig Music; Format: Compact disc
Woody Guthrie's Happy Joyous Hanukkah	Released: September 5, 2006; Label: Shout! Studios; Format: Compact disc
Wonder Wheel	Released: July 25, 2006; Label: Shout! Studios; Format: Compact disc
Blackthorn: Irish Love Songs	Released: March 14, 2006; Label: World Village; Format: Compact disc
Saints & Tzadiks	Released: July 8, 2009; Label: World Village; Format: Compact disc
Singing in the Dark	Released: October 30, 2010; Label: Hibernian Music; Format: Compact disc
Live at Town Hall	Released: October 11, 2011; Label: Proper Music Distribution; Format: Compact disc
Belong	Released: November 13, 2012; Label: Fish Records; Format: Compact disc

== Filmography ==
=== Film ===
Year	Title	Role	Notes
1999	Natalie Merchant: Live in Concert	Herself (guest vocals)	Live concert video
2003	Robert Capa: In Love and War	Performer/writer	Soundtrack
2005	My Brother's War	Performer/writer	Soundtrack
2007	32A	Performer/writer	Soundtrack
2024	Twig	Teresa	Feature film debut

=== Television ===
Year	Title	Role	Notes
1990	The Late Late Show	Herself – performer	RTÉ Late-night show
1990	Nighthawks	Herself – performer	RTÉ2 Late-night show
1996	All Things Considered	Herself – performer	NPR talk show
1997	The Soul of Christmas: A Celtic Music Celebration	Herself – performer	PBS Holiday special
1997	Sessions at West 54th	Herself – performer	PBS: "Planctus" with Philip Glass
1999	The Irish Empire	Herself – performer	BBC Two Miniseries
1999	The Early Show	Herself – performer	CBS Morning show
2000	A Prairie Home Companion	Herself – performer	NPR variety show
2001	Mountain Stage	Herself – performer	NPR variety show
2003	The Infinite Mind	Herself – performer	NPR talk show
2003	American Masters	Herself – performer	PBS Television series
