= Prophecy (Susan McKeown album) =

Studio album by Susan McKeown
- Released: March 4, 2002
- Studio: Mission Sound Studios (Brooklyn, New York)
- Genre: Folk; Celtic; pop rock
- Length: 37:55
- Label: Sheila-na-Gig Music
- Producer: Susan McKeown; Jon Sparney

Susan McKeown chronology
A Winter Talisman (2001)	Prophecy (2002)	Sweet Liberty (2004)

Prophecy is the second studio album by Susan McKeown & The Chanting House, following their debut, Bones, in 1996. Produced by McKeown and guitarist Jon Sparney, the album was released through indie label Sheila-na-Gig Music on March 4, 2002.

Prophecy was met with critical acclaim from various media outlets, including The Irish Times, Hot Press, CLUAS, Folk World, and Pure Music. The song "River" was later covered by Irish band Gráda on their 2007 album Cloudy Day Navigation.

== Background ==
While promoting Prophecy, McKeown stated that the album's titular track was written in response to the grief of 9/11,

"The last song on my album, 'Prophesy,' wouldn't have happened if September 11th hadn't happened. I had been reading a story by Yeats called 'The Golden Age' and there was a line in it: 'And if there is a kind and perfect world / It's a buried mass of roses under spadefuls of earth.' And that really made me think of what they call Ground Zero. Because there was all this beauty and joy and peoples' lives that was lost in all of this mess that was still down there until May. It's a hope song really.

The track "Because I Could Not Stop for Death", inspired by the Emily Dickinson poem of the same name, was recorded as a duet with the American singer-songwriter Natalie Merchant. The song was included in The Guardian's "Top 20 Songs of Fate & Destiny". McKeown later performed the song with the RTÉ Concert Orchestra.

== Critical reception ==
Professional ratings
Review scores
Source	Rating
The Irish Times	4/5 stars
Encyclopedia of Popular Music	3/5 stars

Much like its predecessor, Bones, Prophecy was met with critical praise from various media outlets. Siobhan Long, in a review for The Irish Times, praised the album, stating "Challenging and cerebral, Prophecy's 10 gemstones will tap at your subconscious long after first hearing... Renaissance musicianship. Damn fine."

Sarah McQuaid, in a review for Hot Press, offered similar praise, writing

McKeown’s last album, Lowlands (2000), had critics falling over themselves to laud her return to traditional Irish material. Perversely, she’s answered their praise with an elaborately produced album of original songs, complete with electric guitars, bass, drums and more exotic instruments such as “spooky loops” and “mellotron”… McKeown has a wonderfully rich voice, and she isn’t afraid to make use of its full range and vibrato – a refreshing change from the little-girl breathiness that’s dominated the airwaves of late. On her setting of Emily Dickinson’s ‘Because I Could Not Stop For Death’, she swaps verses and harmonies with Natalie Merchant, who also contributes backing vocals to ‘River’.

Folk World was equally enthusiastic, noting "A prolific composer and recording artist in her own right, Susan McKeown's latest offering with her band The Chanting House is a feast of strong, mature, often invigorating songs. Better known to some as a traditional singer, this album is more closely related to her debut, Bones, which was only on release in the US. More rock than folk, the blend also has occasional flecks of jazz, while McKeown's personal literary influences are very much in evidence with several of the tracks being based on extracts from literature or folklore."

Irish publication CLUAS observed, following the critically acclaimed Lowlands, Susan McKeown is back with a new release "Prophecy"... The sound is much more diversified than before and the lyrics are inherently dark and often wistful. Alternating between foot-tapping melody and gothic ballads, McKeown deals with heritage, religious faith and personal loss. Yet in a contradictive way, the album exposes feeling of a positive nature propelled by her delicate yet strong vocals. McKeown's inventive techniques have presented an album that is as compelling as it is diverse... She has successfully crossed genres here and the album is performed with an artistic excellence and with honest conviction, and it is sure to broaden her horizons. In that sense, "Prophecy" is indeed a prophetic album."

Pure Music wrote "Not the old country, as it used to be called. Susan McKeown's vision and inspired take on Irish music has been uniquely global, as was borne out in our interview with her in the August issue of last year. But although there is one song inspired by Irish folklore, this is not an Irish music album. This is Susan McKeown and The Chanting House, which we've been waiting on a second record from since their brilliant debut, Bones. (1996, PrimeCD.) I am truly grateful for greatness, when I come upon it. Susan McKeown's music never fails in this regard."

== Track listing ==
All tracks are written by Susan McKeown.

Prophecy track listing
No.	Title	Length
1.	"Be Brave Love, Be Strong"	3:46
2.	"River"	3:35
3.	"Chances Are Bass"	4:44
4.	"Wheel of the World"	3:33
5.	"Seven Cold Glories"	3:07
6.	"What Did I Ever Do to You?"	2:27
7.	"Because I could not stop for Death"	3:46
8.	"Ballinaboula"	4:10
9.	"South"	5:15
10.	"Prophecy"	2:40
Total length:		37:55

== Personnel ==
=== Primary Artist ===
- Susan McKeown – lead vocals, producer, composer, arranger, guitar, bodhrán

=== Musicians ===
- Chris Cunningham – bouzouki, guitar, harmonium
- Eoin Woods – guitar, background vocals
- Jerry O'Sullivan – uilleann pipes
- Jimi Zhivago – bass pedals, dobro, 12-string guitar, mellotron, Hammond organ
- Joe Trump – drums, cymbals, percussion
- Johnny Cunningham – fiddle
- Lindsey Horner – bass, bass clarinet, tin whistle
- Michelle Kinney – cello, background vocals
- Shawn Pelton – cymbals
- Tom Zajac – bagpipes, hurdy-gurdy, sackbut
