= Saints & Tzadiks =

Studio album by Susan McKeown
- Released: August 11, 2009
- Studio: Wombat Recording Company, (Brooklyn, NY)
- Genre: Folk, Celtic, Klezmer
- Length: 48:22
- Label: World Village
- Producer: Susan McKeown; Lorin Sklamberg

Susan McKeown chronology
Blackthorn: Irish Love Songs (2006)	Saints & Tzadiks (2009)	Singing in the Dark (2010)

Saints & Tzadiks is an album by Irish folk singer, Susan McKeown and The Klezmatics lead vocalist, Lorin Sklamberg. The album was released through World Village on August 11, 2009. Produced by McKeown and Sklamberg, Saints & Tzadiks features original arrangements of traditional Irish and Yiddish folk music. The albums' title is a play on the historical nickname for Ireland as "an island of Saint and Scholars," replacing "scholars" with "Tzadik", a title in Judaism given to "highly learned and esteemed rabbinic leaders."

Saints & Tzadiks was met with critical acclaim from various media outlets, including AllMusic, Blogcritics, and Green Man Review, among others. In support of the album, McKeown and Sklamberg embarked on an international tour of the U.S., Germany, Switzerland, and Austria.

== Background ==
The musical partnership between McKeown and Sklamberg began in December 2003, when McKeown joined The Klezmatics and Arlo Guthrie for "The Jewish Songs of Woody Guthrie," a concert at New York's 92nd Street Y. Said songs were written during Guthrie's years in Coney Island, where he lived with his second wife. Long forgotten in Guthrie's archives, the lyrics were rediscovered in 1998 by his daughter Nora, who passed them on to The Klezmatics to set to music.

In 2004, McKeown joined the Klezmatics in the studio to record the 2006 album Woody Guthrie's Happy Joyous Hanukkah and subsequently toured with the band. She collaborated with the band once again on their 2006 Woody Guthrie project Wonder Wheel, which went on to win the 2007 Grammy Award for Best Contemporary World Music Album.

McKeown and Sklamberg would later collaborate a third time the 2011 album Live at Town Hall, recorded at a 2007 concert performance in New York city.

== Critical reception ==
Professional ratings
Review scores
Source	Rating
AllMusic	4/5 stars

Saints & Tzadiks was met with critical praise from various media outlets. Chris Nickson, in a review for AllMusic, wrote

In a more intimate follow-up to McKeown's collaboration with the Klezmatics, the Irish singer does a duet album with one of their longtime members, Lorin Sklamberg. And what a joy it is. They kick things off on exactly the right note with "Heart's Blood," a ballad shared by both traditions, giving them the chance to trade verses in English and Yiddish. From there come songs in Irish, songs in Yiddish, and plenty of great beauty, whether accompanied by a small group or alone (Sklamberg does a wonderful unaccompanied "Father and Son," while McKeown performs the same for "Bridget"). It's a thrilling ride, often full of joy and laughter, as exemplified by "Yula," "The Rattlin' Bog," and "My Little Belly," but also capable of intense emotion ("The Dark Slender Boy"). While an Irish-Yiddish pairing might not seem too obvious, at least on first blush, these two have enough talent, taste, and openness to make it seem the most natural thing in the world -- but then, they've both been breaking down barriers for a long time now.

Patrick O'Donnell of Green Man Review offered similar praise, noting “Saints & Tzadiks is a unique and amazing work of aural art; full of unexpected delights and twists that will leave the listener wondering what’s next – and wondering how McKeown and Sklamberg put it all together without becoming tongue-tied. It’s by far one of the most original CDs I’ve heard in years.”

Richard Marcus, in a review for Blogcritics was equally enthusiastic, writing "Well, I haven't heard the previous work, but all I can say is if anybody finds Saints & Tzadiks a disappointment they need to consider having their ears checked for hearing loss. Each of the twelve tracks on this disc are a wonder and a joy that tap into the wide range of emotions both traditions are famous for. What's really wonderful is that for two cultures with plenty of reasons for music to be replete with sadness, the collection on this disc does more than just break your heart as they have uncovered treasures to lift the heart and well as making it ache."

== Track listing ==
All tracks are performed and arranged by McKeown and Sklamberg.

1. "Heart's Blood" - 3:23
2. "Buenos Aires" - 4:27
3. "Oakum" - 2:50
4. "My Little Belly" - 1:53
5. "Prayer For The Dead" - 7:17
6. "The Hag With The Money" - 4:26
7. "Father And Son" - 3:38
8. "Enniscorthy Fair" - 3:25
9. "Bridget" - 1:48
10. "The Rattlin' Bog" - 3:20
11. "The Dark Slender Boy" - 5:58
12. "Yula" - 6:03

== Personnel ==
- Susan McKeown - vocals, producer, arranger, bodhran
- Lorin Sklamberg - vocals, producer, arranger, piano, accordion
- Aidan Brennan - arranger
- Erik Della Penna - guitar (acoustic), guitar (electric), backing vocals, tres
- Lindsey Horner - bass
- Ross Bonadonna - engineer, mastering, mixing
- John Francis Bourke - photography
