= Mother: Songs Celebrating Mothers & Motherhood =

Mother

Studio album by Susan McKeown, Cathie Ryan, and Robin Spielberg
- Released: March 23, 1999
- Studio: Live Wire (New York, New York); RPM (New York, NY); Sear Sound Studios (New York, New York); Sigma Sound Studios (Philadelphia, Pennsylvania); Soundworks Studio (Boston, Massachusetts)
- Genre: Folk, Celtic, pop rock
- Length: 52:24
- Label: North Star Music
- Producer: Susan McKeown; Cathie Ryan; Robin Spielberg

Susan McKeown chronology
Mighty Rain (1998)	Mother (1999)	Lowlands (2000)

Cathie Ryan chronology
The Music of What Happens (1998)	Mother (1999)	Somewhere Along the Road (2001)

Robin Spielberg chronology
In the Arms of the Wind ( (1997)	Mother (1999)	Beautiful Dreamer (2000)

Mother: Songs Celebrating Mothers & Motherhood is an album by Susan McKeown, Cathie Ryan, and Robin Spielberg. The album was released through North Star Music on March 23, 1999. Produced by McKeown, Ryan, and Spielberg, Mother features Charae Krueger, Gerry Leonard, Gerry O'Beirne, Jeff Berman, Johnny Cunningham, and Áine Minogue.

McKeown, Ryan, and Spielberg first met working on the holiday record The Soul of Christmas: A Celtic Music Celebration for Tommy Boy Records in 1997. While filming the accompanying PBS Christmas special, the trio hatched the idea for a "collaborative album of songs celebrating mothers and motherhood." Mother was met with mixed to positive reviews from music critics. While promoting the album, McKeown, Ryan, and Spielberg were featured on CBS Mornings' Mother's Day Special, airing May 5th, 1999.

== Critical reception ==
Professional ratings
Review scores
Source	Rating
AllMusic	2.5/5 stars
Encyclopedia of Popular Music	3/5 stars

Mother was met mixed to positive reviews from music critics, receiving 2.5/5 stars from AllMusic.

Scott Iwasaki of Deseret News noted "Singer-songwriter Susan McKeown, vocalist Cathie Ryan, and pianist Robin Spielberg have come up with an album titled Mother: Songs Celebrating Mothers & Motherhood, which not only praises mothers but also can be used as a tool of reconciliation. The album is filled with flowing arrangements that smack of Celtic lilts, classical piano, and folk melodies. McKeown's 'Mother of Mine' begins the multi-faceted journey into motherhood. The angelic and reverent 'Rock Me to Sleep, Mother' is sung by Ryan. And the dreamy piano-laden 'Walk with Me', performed by Spielberg and guest cellist Jennifer Langham, was inspired by the pianist's mother's daily walks... Mother is a good album for those who enjoy Celtic and piano music. However, there are cuts, such as 'Grandma's Song', in which the mood and tone can get a little grating."

In a review for MainlyPiano, Kathy Parsons wrote, "This collaboration between Irish singer/songwriters Susan McKeown and Cathie Ryan, and pianist/composer Robin Spielberg is a celebration of motherhood “for anyone who has ever had a mother, is a mother, or is likely to become a mother!” I'm not sure Mother’s appeal will be quite that universal, but since most of the songs have a Celtic feel to them, it should fit into the broad popularity of that genre... This is a very interesting project that covers a lot of musical territory as well as many of the various aspects of motherhood and family relationships. The liner notes are full of photos from the three women’s childhoods (with their mothers), and the lyrics as well as the backgrounds of the pieces, are included. It makes a very nice package."

== Track listing ==
All tracks performed by McKeown, Ryan, and Spielberg
No.	Title	Writer(s)	Length
1.	"Mother Of Mine"	Susan McKeown	3:55
2.	"Rock Me To Sleep, Mother"	Cathie Ryan	4:07
3.	Untitled	Walk With Me	3:24
4.	"Pheata Beag Do Mháthar"	Traditional	3:15
5.	"Ancient Mother"	Susan McKeown	3:49
6.	"Jennie's Song"	Susan McKeown	4:02
7.	"Circle Of Life"	Robin Spielberg	4:07
8.	"Grandma's Song"	Cathie Ryan	3:09
9.	"Mother's Celebration"	Robin Spielberg	3:48
10.	"Real Pretty Mama"	Robin Spielberg	3:15
11.	"Seothín Seo Hó"	Traditional	4:39
12.	"Buíochas/Thanks"	Susan McKeown	2:55
13.	"Song For Jennie (We're Almost There)"	Robin Spielberg	4:45
14.	"Baby's Lullaby"	Robin Spielberg	3:14
Total length:			52:24

== Personnel ==
- Brian Capouch - Assistant Engineer, Engineer
- Cathie Ryan - Adaptation, Bodhran, Producer, Vocals, Vocals (Background)
- Charae Krueger - Cello
- Chico Huff - Fretless Bass
- Cillian Vallely - Low Whistle, Uilleann pipes, Whistle (Human)
- Dave Fisher - Assistant Engineer
- Ed Wedberg - Technician
- Fred Kevorkian - Engineer
- Gerry Leonard - Guitar (Acoustic), Guitar (Electric), Harmonium
- Gerry O'Beirne - Guitar, Slide Guitar, Ukulele
- Gerry Putnam - Mastering
- Greg Anderson - Bouzouki
- Greg Gonsalves - Design
- Jeff Allen - Bass
- Jeff Berman - Dulcimer, Percussion, Shaker, Triangle, Udu, Vocals (Background)
- John Anthony - Djembe, Engineer, Mixing, Triangle
- John Ryan - Photography
- Johnny Cunningham - Fiddle
- Larry Kosson - Photography
- Matt Johnson - Drums
- Michael Aharon - Accordion
- Michelle Kinney - Cello
- Oscar S. Marin - Technician
- Paul Major - Mixing, Mixing Assistant
- Rick Ridpath - Assistant Engineer, Mixing, Mixing Assistant
- Robin Spielberg - Piano, Producer, Vocals
- Ryan Smith - Engineer
- Steve Holloway - Congas, Djembe, Drums, Shaker
- Steve Revitte - Assistant Engineer
- Susan McKeown - Harmonium, Producer, Translation, Vocals, Vocals (Background)
- Suzie Dyer - Engineer
- Tom Monte - Technician
- Áine Minogue - Celtic Harp
