= Bushes and Briars (album) =

Bushes & Briars

Studio album by Susan McKeown
- Released: February 3, 1998
- Studio: Daiichi Kosho Studios (New York, NY)
- Genre: Folk, Celtic
- Length: 50:46
- Label: Alula Records
- Producer: Akira Satake; Jamshied Sharifi; Susan McKeown

Susan McKeown chronology
Snakes (1997)	Bushes & Briars (1998)	Mighty Rain (1998)

Professional ratings
Review scores
Source	Rating
AllMusic	4.5/5 stars
Encyclopedia of Popular Music	4/5 stars

Bushes & Briars is the sixth studio album by Irish folk singer Susan McKeown. It was released through Alula Records on February 3, 1998. Produced by McKeown, Jamshied Sharifi, and Akira Satake, Bushes & Briars features guest appearances from Andy Irvine, Chris Speed, Greg Anderson, Jerry O'Sullivan, Skúli Sverrisson, and Séamus Egan.

The album was met with critical acclaim from various media outlets, including AllMusic, The Christian Science Monitor, and Green Man Review, among others.

== Critical reception ==
Buhses & Briars was met with critical praise from various media outlets. Rick Anderson, in a review for AllMusic awarded the album 4.5 stars, writing:

On Bushes & Briars, Susan McKeown brings her eloquent and haunting voice—as well as the instrumental talents of a distinguished cast of supporting musicians—to bear on a set of traditional Celtic and British songs. Most of her accompanists are Irish musicians, but the arrangements are anything but traditional: McKeown sings "In London So Fair" over a shimmery bed of looped whistles and mandolins; "Bonny Boy" is delivered a cappella in a controlled voice that hints at an underlying frenzy of rage and sexual frustration; and her accompaniment on "The Mountain Streams Where the Moorcocks Crow" consists entirely of tabla, tambura and low whistle—a truly bizarre instrumentation that fits so perfectly with her quiet, resigned delivery that you may not even notice its strangeness. McKeown has taken an ancient repertoire and made it entirely new and her own, with wonderful results.

Norman Weinstein, in a review for The Christian Science Monitor was equally effusive, noting

The most strikingly original contemporary woman singer working this Celtic vein is Susan McKeown. Her new CD on the Alula label, Bushes & Briars, is a triumph... The title tune is a perfect example of how McKeown blends her vocal genius with an original instrumental concept. The lyrics, sung with great restraint and stateliness, cover the familiar theme of infidelity. Most unfamiliar is the song's strong percussive undertow: drummers creating an Afro-Celtic sound, making the ancient lament seem strikingly modern because of cross-cultural blending.

Meredith Tarr, in a write-up for Green Man Review offered similar praise, stating

McKeown's first album of traditional music, Bushes & Briars, is an excellent showcase of not only her stunning voice, but the range of Irish music she has discovered. It is also an intriguing fusion of Celtic and other musical traditions. This album showcases the range of McKeown’s voice, as she ably conveys the emotions of the songs, whether she is singing in English or Gaelic. At the same time, the distinctly contemporary arrangements breathe new life into the traditional material. On the surface, I wouldn’t have expected a fusion of Indian and Irish instrumentation to work, for example, but here they come together beautifully.

== Track listing ==
All tracks are written by Susan McKeown.

Bushes & Briars track listing
No.	Title	Length
1.	"Bushes & Briars"	3:53
2.	"In London So Fair"	5:15
3.	"Seoladh Na Ngamhna (Driving the Calves)"	5:03
4.	"H-O Abha-Inn (Little One)"	3:55
5.	"Bonny Boy"	2:28
6.	"The Mountain Streams Where the Moorcocks Crow"	6:10
7.	"Banks of Claudy"	5:37
8.	"Craigie Hill"	5:33
9.	"A Mháire Bhruinneall"	2:02
10.	"Dñnal Óg"	5:54
11.	"After Aughrim"	4:46
Total length:		50:46

== Personnel ==
=== Primary Artist ===
- Susan McKeown – vocals, composer, arranger, liner notes, producer

=== Musicians ===
- Andy Irvine – mandolin
- Chris Speed – clarinet
- Dave Bargeron – tuba
- Don McGeen – bassoon
- Greg Anderson – cittern, guitar
- Hassan Hakmoun – vocals
- Jamshied Sharifi – arranger, engineer, keyboard, producer, wind arrangements
- Jerry O'Sullivan – uilleann pipes
- John Clark – French horn
- Johnny Cunningham – fiddle
- Larry Campbell – guitar
- Mick McAuley – accordion
- Nikki Matheson – background vocals
- Séamus Egan – bodhrán, flute, whistle
- Skúli Sverrisson – bass, E–bow
- Samir Chatterjee – tabla, tamboura
- Tom Zajac – hurdy-gurdy
- Akira Satake – mandocello; producer
- Ben Wittman – percussion

=== Technical ===
- Dan DiPaola – engineer
- Eric Helmuth – engineer
- Scott Noll – engineer
- Atsushi Yamazaki – assistant engineer
- Ed Oliveau – assistant engineer
- Rich Wilkins – assistant engineer
- Rick Rowe – mastering
- Dennis Connors – photography
- Josef Sudek – photography
