= Snakes (EP) =

EP by Susan McKeown
- Released: November 1, 1997
- Studio: Prime CD Recording (New York, New York); Mission Sound Studios (Brooklyn, New York)
- Genre: Celtic; pop rock
- Length: 17:56
- Label: 1-800-Prime-CD
- Producer: Susan McKeown; Lindsey Horner; Jimi Zhivago

Susan McKeown chronology
Through the Bitter Frost & Snow (1997)	Snakes (1997)	Bushes & Briars (1998)

Snakes is the debut solo EP by Irish singer-songwriter Susan McKeown, featuring songs from her previous collaborative projects, Bones with The Chanting House and Through the Bitter Frost and Snow with Lindsey Horner. Snakes was released through 1-800-Prime-CD on November 1, 1997. Produced by McKeown, Horner, and Jimi Zhivago, the EP contains four tracks.

== Critical reception ==
Mike Boehm of the Los Angeles Times deemed the titular track a "Rosanne Cash-style folk-pop anthem."

== Track listing ==
All tracks are written by Susan McKeown.

Snakes track listing
No.	Title	Length
1.	"Snakes/Mná na hÉireann (radio version)"	4:06
2.	"Winter King"	2:48
3.	"Daddy's Little Girl"	3:20
4.	"Snakes/Mná na hÉireann (album version)"	5:51
Total length:		17:56

== Personnel ==
=== Primary Artist ===
- Susan McKeown – vocals, composer, guitar, producer

=== Musicians ===
- Jeff Berman – drums, percussion
- Chris Cunningham – electric guitar, harmonica
- Lindsey Horner – bass, electric bass, clarinet, producer
- Michelle Kinney – accordion, cello
- Joe Trump – drums, percussion
- Jimi Zhivago – organ, Hammond organ; producer

=== Technical ===
- Oliver Strauss – engineer
- Irene Trudel – engineer
- Mark Dann – mastering
- David Seitz – mixing
- John Francis Bourke – photography
