= Through the Bitter Frost and Snow =

Through the Bitter Frost & Snow

Studio album by Susan McKeown
- Released: October 14, 1997
- Studio: Prime CD Recording (New York, NY)
- Genre: Folk, Celtic, Christmas
- Length: 52:11
- Label: 1-800-Prime-CD; Broadcast Music, Inc.
- Producer: David Seitz; Susan McKeown; Lindsey Horner

Susan McKeown chronology
Bones (1996)	Through the Bitter Frost & Snow (1997)	Snakes (1997)

Through the Bitter Frost & Snow is a holiday album by Irish folk singer, Susan McKeown and American jazz double-bassist, Lindsey Horner. The album was released through 1-800-Prime-CD and Broadcast Music, Inc. on October 14, 1997. Produced by David Seitz, McKeown and Horner, Through the Bitter Frost & Snow features guest appearances from Jeff Berman, Michelle Kinney, Pete McCann, and Carol Sharar.

Through the Bitter Frost & Snow was met with critical acclaim from various media outlets, including AllMusic, Rhythm, the Los Angeles Times, and The Washington Post, among others. While promoting the album, McKeown and Horner performed their version of Auld Lang Syne on the New Year’s Eve broadcast of NPR’s All Things Considered.

== Critical reception ==
Professional ratings
Review scores
Source	Rating
AllMusic	4/5 stars
Encyclopedia of Popular Music	4/5 stars
Rhythm	4/5 stars

Through the Bitter Frost & Snow was met with critical praise from various media outlets. Rick Anderson, in a review for AllMusic, wrote

This thematic collection of songs about winter and Christmas finds McKeown beginning to realize the potential that peeked out at irregular intervals on her last full-length effort (Bones, 1996). Now that the focus is primarily on her voice and on the muscular but sensitive bass playing of Lindsey Horner, things are a bit lighter and jazzier, especially on "Winter King" and the lovely "Bold Orion," which includes an out-of-place but strangely satisfying electric guitar solo. "Green Grow'th the Holly" is a 15th-century English Christmas song that McKeown delivers in gorgeous multi-tracked three-part harmony. But the album's centerpiece is the stark and beautiful voice-and-bass rendition of "Auld Lang Syne" that had NPR's phones ringing off the hook when McKeown and Horner performed it during a New Year's Eve broadcast. This is a perfect disc to play while sitting by the fire with a loved one on a frigid winter night-not because it's romantic, exactly, but because it lets you feel alternately the severity of winter and the warmth of the Christmas season's promise, all without leaving your living room. A remarkable album.

Mike Boehm of the Los Angeles Times called the album “absorbing” noting “McKeown offers a rare combination of gifts: a mastery of traditional Celtic and British folk music dating to medieval times and the ability to draw on a wide range of contemporary influences in her often excellent original folk-pop songwriting. On Through the Bitter Frost and Snow, McKeown’s grounding in the old anchors and flavors her explorations of the new.”

Martin Keller of Rhythm was equally enthusiastic, writing "McKeown and Horner have managed to create a highly distinctive record of wintry exploration that mixes traditional British Isles folk singing and jazz phrasing while embracing familiar fare such as "Coventry Carol," "Auld Lang Syne" (almost dirgelike), and "Green Grow'th the Holly." No stranger to melancholy, the record will have a disquieting affect. But it will also please and intrigue with its bittersweet sadness and ironic arrangements for anyone willing to acquire such a beguiling taste of the dark month of Christmas."

Richard Harrington of The Washington Post was similarly effusive, stating "McKeown, a mesmerizing Irish vocalist, and multi-instrumentalist Horner explore the physical, emotional and spiritual chill of winter, occasionally letting in some rays of hope. The title track, "When All the Songs Were Sad" and "Song of Forgetting" are all somber meditations and even the familiar cello-driven "Coventry Carol" reinforces its root as a pavane for the children of Bethlehem slaughtered by Herod's soldiers. Darkly beautiful stuff."

== Track listing ==
Through the Bitter Frost & Snow track listing
No.	Title	Writer(s)	Length
1.	"The Bitter Frost And Snow"	Susan McKeown	3:37
2.	"Winter King"	Susan McKeown	2:50
3.	"When All The Songs Were Sad"	Lindsey Horner	3:10
4.	"Green Groweth the Holly" (Arranged by McKeown)	Traditional	1:27
5.	"Bold Orion"	Leo Kretzner	3:29
6.	"Song Of Forgetting"	Lindsey Horner	4:59
7.	"Christ Child" (Arranged by Horner & McKeown)	Traditional	2:59
8.	"Don Oíche Úd i mBeithil" (Arranged by Horner & McKeown)	Traditional	3:28
9.	"All Hallows"	Lindsey Horner	2:02
10.	"Coventry Carol" (Arranged by Horner & McKeown)	Traditional	3:13
11.	"There Is No Rose" (Arranged by Horner & McKeown)	Traditional	3:21
12.	"Auld Lang Syne"	Robert Burns	3:37
13.	"I Sing Of A Maiden" (Arranged by Horner & McKeown)	Traditional	2:05
Total length:			52:11

== Personnel ==
=== Primary Artists ===
- Susan McKeown – vocals, composer, arranger, producer
- Lindsey Horner – bass, electric bass, bass clarinet, guitar, harmonium, whistle, producer

=== Musicians ===
- Jeff Berman – drums
- Michelle Kinney – cello
- Pete McCann – electric guitar
- Carol Sharar – viola

=== Technical ===
- Robert Burns – composer
- David Seitz – producer, engineer
- Ray Martin – engineer, mixing
- Reaann Zschokke – assistant engineer
