= Sweet Liberty (Susan McKeown album) =

Studio album by Susan McKeown
- Released: April 13, 2004
- Studio: Dubway Studios (New York, New York)
- Genre: Folk, Celtic, World
- Length: 48:12
- Label: World Village; Hibernia Records
- Producer: Susan McKeown

Susan McKeown chronology
| Prophecy (2002) | Sweet Liberty (2004) | Blackthorn: Irish Love Songs (2006) |

Sweet Liberty is a studio album by Irish folk singer Susan McKeown.It was released through World Village and Hibernia Records on April 13, 2004. Produced by McKeown, Sweet Liberty features a variety of musical influences from around the globe, including Celtic folk, Mexican Mariachi, and Malian Tuareg music.

Sweet Liberty was met with critical acclaim from various media outlets, including AllMusic, The New York Times, The Wall Street Journal, Hot Press, and Paste, among others. "Eggs in Her Basket" was nominated for Best Original Track at the 2005 BBC Radio 2 Folk Awards.

== Critical reception ==
Professional ratings
Review scores
| Source | Rating |
|---|---|
| AllMusic | 4.5/5 stars |
| Encyclopedia of Popular Music | 3/5 stars |

Sweet Liberty was met with critical acclaim from various media outlets. In a review for AllMusic, William Ruhlmann noted:

Every song on Susan McKeown's album Sweet Liberty is credited to "Traditional" as author, which is frequently the case with her recordings. But McKeown's approach to this material, which she has gathered from friends and from old books and recordings (as recounted in her notes), is often anything but traditional. "Oró Mhíle Grá (A Thousand Times My Love)" is a collaboration with Ensemble Tartit, a singing group from Mali, and its combination of Celtic and African elements makes for a stirring hybrid. On "Eggs in Her Basket," McKeown is accompanied by the Mexican group Mariachi Real de Mexico, again adding an unusual interpretation to a traditional Irish tune. But even when she is using musicians who perform in a more familiar Celtic style, such as Flook, the Anglo-Irish quartet that backs her on the leadoff track, "The Wee Birds All Have Come and Gone/Fisherman's," McKeown makes her versions of the songs distinctive by her combinations of different compositions, her striking arrangements, and her haunting voice... Sweet Liberty is traditional enough to please fans of Celtic music in its oldest forms, but it also suggests new directions for the style, and it serves as a showcase for an impressive singer."

Jon Pareles from The New York Times was equally enthusiastic, noting "From the bottomless trove of Irish ballads, Susan McKeown's Sweet Liberty (World Village /Harmonia Mundi) comes up with songs of love, emigration and battle. Her voice has a mournful purity, and it's usually backed by pristinely folky guitar, fiddle and whistles. But she adds surprises: trip-hop electronics, mariachi trumpet and even Ensemble Tartit from Mali sharing a Gaelic call-and-response song that taunts, 'May a peeled potato with the moon in its middle choke you.'"

Tad Hendrickson of The Wall Street Journal offered a more mixed review, writing "Irish-born and New York-based singer Susan McKeown has made a name for herself over the last decade by interpreting Irish traditionals she's found through research or been taught by other musicians. Sometimes she can be a bit overambitious in her interpretations: thus we get a slightly disorienting version of the Irish song "Oró Mhíle Grá (A Thousand Times My Love)," which features McKeown fronting the Malian group Ensemble Tartit... Much of the rest of the album is beautifully understated Irish folk music driven with acoustic guitar, whistles, fiddle, and harmonium. With a voice as beautiful and strong as hers, one wonders why McKeown is not bigger name in the genre."

== Track listing ==
All tracks composed by Susan McKeown

1. "The Wee Birds All Have Come And Gone/Fisherman's" – 3:01
2. "Shamrock Green" – 5:48
3. "Johnny Scott" – 6:39
4. "Oró Mhíle Grá'A Thousand Times My Love" – 4:27
5. "Sweet Liberty / Promenade" – 6:05
6. "Eggs In Her Basket" – 3:54
7. "Fair Annie" – 3:30
8. "Caledonia" – 3:48
9. "The Winter It Is Past" – 6:20
10. "When I Was On Horseback" – 4:22

== Personnel ==
- Susan McKeown – arranger, audio production, Bodhran, liner notes, producer, vocals
- Sarah Allen – arranger, flute (alto)
- Dee Armstrong – fiddle
- Ed Boyd – arranger, guitar
- Aidan Brennan – guitar
- Johnny Cunningham – fiddle
- Brian Finnegan – arranger, flute
- Charlie Giordano – accordion
- Fatoumata Haidara – choir/chorus, handclapping
- Donogh Hennessy – arranger, whistle (human)
- Lindsey Horner – bass
- John Joe Kelly – arranger, Bodhran
- Dana Lyn – fiddle
- Joanie Madden – low whistle, whistle (human)
- Eamon O'Leary – guitar
- Fadimata Walett Oumar – soloist, tinde, vocals
- Mohamed Issa Ag Oumar – guitar
- Robin Ponce – guitar, guitarron, Vihuela
- Gabino Samano – violin
- John Spurney – harmonium, piano
- Tartit – arranger
- Ismael Casillas Torres – trumpet
- Israel Torres – trumpet
- Pete DeBoer – engineer
- Jason Marcucci – engineer
- Rick Rowe – mastering
- Oliver Strauss – audio engineer, drum loop, mixing
- John Francis Bourke – photography
- Steve Byram – artwork, design
- Devon Moore Curtin – photography
