= Woody Guthrie's Happy Joyous Hanukkah =

Studio album by The Klezmatics
- Released: September 5, 2006
- Recorded: 2003–2004
- Studio: Magic Shop, New York City
- Genre: Klezmer, folk
- Length: 50:55
- Label: Shout! Studios
- Producer: Nora Guthrie

The Klezmatics chronology
Wonder Wheel (2006)	Woody Guthrie's Happy Joyous Hanukkah (2006)	Tuml=Lebn: The Best of the First 20 Years (2008)

Susan McKeown chronology
Wonder Wheel (2006)	Woody Guthrie's Happy Joyous Hanukkah (2006)	Saints & Tzadiks (2009)

Professional ratings
Review scores
Source	Rating
AllMusic	4/5 stars
Robert Christgau	A

Woody Guthrie's Happy Joyous Hanukkah is a holiday album by The Klezmatics, with Susan McKeown. The album was released by Shout! Studios on September 5, 2006. It contains Hanukkah-themed songs, with most of the lyrics written by American folk singer Woody Guthrie in 1949.

== Critical reception ==
In a review for AllMusic, Jeff Tamarkin awarded the album 4 stars, writing "a companion piece to 2006's sublime Wonder Wheel, Happy Joyous Hanukkah, like that album, dips into Woody Guthrie's catalog of recently discovered, previously unrecorded Jewish lyrics, to which the Klezmatics have written new music... The Klezmatics are the ideal band to bring Guthrie's dormant words to life: vocalist Lorin Sklamberg's crystalline pipes lend a natural merriment to the band's arrangements, and trumpeter Frank London, who crafted the music for most of the songs that Sklamberg didn't, injects an experimentalism into the proceedings without losing sight of tradition." The Sun Sentinel called the album "a fascinating project."

== Track listing ==
All tracks are written by Woody Guthrie.

Woody Guthrie's Happy Joyous Hanukkah track listing
No.	Title	Length
1.	"Honeyky Hanuka"	2:37
2.	"Happy Joyous Hanuka"	3:58
3.	"Gilad and Ziv's Sirba"	2:55
4.	"Hanuka Bell"	3:29
5.	"(Do The) Latke Flip-Flop"	4:03
6.	"Hanukah Tree"	2:29
7.	"The Many and the Few"	6:24
8.	"Groovy's Freylekhs"	3:54
9.	"Hanuka Gelt"	3:13
10.	"Spin Dreydl Spin"	2:34
11.	"Hanuka's Flame"	4:33
12.	"Hanuka Dance"	5:32
Total length:		45:41

== Personnel ==
- Matt Darriau - reeds, Jew's harp
- Lisa Gutkin - violin, harmony vocals
- David Licht - drums
- Frank London - trumpet, harmonium, alto horn, harmony vocals
- Paul Morrissett - bass, tsimbl, baritone horn, bass vocals
- Lorin Sklamberg - lead vocals, accordion, piano
- Susan McKeown - vocals: "The Many and the Few," harmony vocals, "Happy Joyous Hanuka," and "Hanuka's Flame"
- Boo Reiners - guitars, banjo, mandolin
- Greg Anderson - guitar, "Hanuka Dance"; zoura, "Hanuka Gelt"; production and mixing
- Danny Blume - vocals and electric guitar, "(Do the) Latke Flip-Flip"
- Erik Anjou, Annette Ezekiel, Tine Kinderman, Klara Zikova - chorus, "Hanuka's Flame"

== See also ==
- Mermaid Avenue (1998)
- Man in the Sand (1999)
- Mermaid Avenue Vol. II (2000)
- Wonder Wheel (2006)
- The Works (2008)
- New Multitudes (2012)
- Mermaid Avenue: The Complete Sessions (2012)
- Secular Jewish music
