= Belong (Susan McKeown album) =

Studio album by Susan McKeown
- Released: November 13, 2012
- Studios: Audio Monkey (Galway, Ireland); Mission Sound (Brooklyn, New York); Wombat Recording (Brooklyn, New York)
- Genres: Folk, world, pop rock
- Length: 38:58
- Labels: East River Records (United States); Hibernian Records (Ireland); Fish Records (United Kingdom)
- Producer: Susan McKeown

Susan McKeown chronology
Singing in the Dark (2010)	Belong (2012)

Professional ratings
Review scores
Source	Rating
The Irish Times	4/5 stars
The Irish Examiner	5/5 stars
The Oak Ridger	5/5 stars

Belong is the twentieth studio album by Irish singer-songwriter Susan McKeown, released through Hibernian Records on November 13, 2012. Produced by McKeown, Belong features guest appearances from Declan O'Rourke and James Maddock.

Belong peaked at No. 11 on the Billboard Folk Albums chart, while "Everything We Had Was Good" reached No. 1 on the Folk Singles chart. The song “No Jericho” was covered by Irish singer Mary Coughlan on her 2020 album Life Stories.

The album was met with critical acclaim from various media outlets, including AllMusic, The Irish Times, the Irish Examiner, and IrishCentral.

== Critical reception ==
Siobhán Long, in a review for The Irish Times, awarded the album 4 stars, writing

"McKeown's voice, widely admired for its clarity and richness of tone, is getting better and better with age. Ever more open, more welcoming, it's as if she is coming closer to home and to herself, with each of her recent album releases. It's apt then, that this latest collection is titled Belong. Filled to bursting with songs that resemble diverse members of a single household, each one asserting its identity in suitably idiosyncratic fashion… Thought-provoking and joint-swivelling in equal measure: Belong is quite an achievement."

Gwen Orel, in a review for the Irish Examiner, offered similar praise, remarking "Belong is a mature CD that looks out as much as in, sharing observations of individuals and places, inviting the listener into its world."

Mike Farragher, in a review for IrishCentral, noted “Susan McKeown has just released a tantalizing new CD, Belong. It blends folk, acoustic blues, country kickin’ beats and slippery jazz to make a perfect blend for your lazy Sunday morning.”

== Track listing ==
All tracks composed by Susan McKeown

1. "On The Bridge To Williamsburg" - 3:06
2. "The Cure" - 3:30
3. "Everything We Had Was Good" - 3:33
4. "Belong" - 3:51
5. "Fallen Angel" - 2:31
6. "Lullaby Of Manhattan" - 5:07
7. "City Of The Roses" - 2:47
8. "Delph" - 2:49
9. "Patience" - 3:48
10. "Our Texas" - 4:04
11. "No Jericho" - 3:58

== Personnel ==
=== Musicians ===
- Susan McKeown – vocals, producer
- Declan O'Rourke – vocals
- James Maddock – vocals
- Aidan Brennan – guitar
- Brendan O'Shea – acoustic guitar
- Erik Della Penna – acoustic guitar, electric guitar
- Erin McKeown – acoustic guitar
- Ryan McGiver – acoustic guitar
- Doug Wieselman – electric guitar, banjo
- Dirk Powell – accordion, banjo
- Eamon O'Leary – banjo
- Jason "Number One" Sypher – bass
- Lindsey Horner – bass
- Allison Miller – drums, percussion
- Shahzad Ismaily – drums, harmonium
- Jimi Zhivago – Hammond B3, piano
- Justin Carroll – Mellotron, Hammond organ, Wurlitzer
- Ray Santiago – bells, congas, maracas, piano
- Michelle Kinney – cello

=== Production and technical personnel ===
- Brian Thorn – mixing
- Dave McNair – mastering
- Oliver Straus – engineer
- Paul Mulligan – engineer
- Joe Plourde – second engineer

=== Artwork and design ===
- Chris Carlone – cover photography
- Grey Jay – design

== Charts ==
Chart (2007)	Peak position
U.S. Folk Albums (Billboard)	11
