= A Winter Talisman =

Studio album by Susan McKeown
- Released: December 19, 2001
- Studio: Mission Sound Studios (Brooklyn, New York)
- Genre: Folk, Celtic, Christmas
- Length: 37:18
- Label: Sheila-na-Gig
- Producer: Susan McKeown; Johnny Cunningham; Aidan Brennan

Susan McKeown chronology
Lowlands (2000)	A Winter Talisman (2001)	Prophecy (2002)

A Winter Talisman is a holiday album by Irish folk singer, Susan McKeown and Scottish fiddle player, Johnny Cunningham, featuring Irish guitarist Aidan Brennan. The album was released through Sheila-na-Gig on December 19, 2001.

A Winter Talisman marked the third full-length collaboration between McKeown and Cunningham, following Peter and Wendy (1996) and The Soul of Christmas (1997). The album was met with critical acclaim from various media outlets, including AllMusic, Goldmine, ALIBI Music, Daily Freeman, and The Standard Times.

== Critical reception ==
Professional ratings
Review scores
Source	Rating
AllMusic	5/5 stars
Encyclopedia of Popular Music	3/5 stars

A Winter Talisman was met with critical praise from various media outlets. AllMusic awarded the album 5/5 stars. In a review for Goldmine, Bruce Sylvester praised the album, writing

The album features driving rhythmical songs, stirring tunes, and wistful melodies of the non-secular sort, from the Mummer's song of the Old Maid's pigs who get their tails cut off to the gorgeous 'Auld Lang Syne'...Beautifully recorded with the sweet sounds of vocals, fiddle and guitar, the album evokes the feel of a winter's night around the fire with some good friends, some fine songs and stories, some great laughs and a peaceful journey home. As the glorious colours of autumn fade into the stark beauty of a silvery winter, friends and family gather together around the fire. Songs and stories are exchanged and shared tears and laughter become a powerful talisman against the cold darkness ahead. We are never truly without hope and comfort when poetry and music light the way towards our new beginnings.

Michael Henningsen, in a review for ALIBI Music was equally enthusiastic, writing "Celtic folk songs in English and captivating Gaelic, infused throughout with Cunningham's wry wit, poetic verse and monumental fiddling." While The Standard Times offered, "Winter in Scotland and Ireland is a time of celebration and great merriment. With a focus rooted in Celtic music and song, Mr. Cunningham and Ms. McKeown present songs of winter and the rich lyricism of early Celtic poetry."

David Malachowski in a review for the Daily Freeman observed

McKeown’s deep, rich contralto powers 14 selections, a distinctive voice that never goes for the obvious. Starting with the stomping chorus march of “A Winter Charm of Lasting Life,” McKeown’s luxurious voice soon serpentines around the brisk “Langoili (Langolee)” and is delicate in the moving “Max Bhan Ni Chuilleannain (Fair Molly Hollywood). The driving “Wexford Mummer’s Song” and its “fah la la lahs” are infectious, while the gorgeous “The Bonny Blue-eyed Lassie” is a stunning highlight, as is the breathtaking a capella “My Singing Bird.” McKeown needs only her powerful pipes and clever way with phrasing to make a song her own. Not content to be pigeonholed in one form, she jumps around genres at a whim, keeping us guessing where she’ll go next. One thing for certain, it will be really good."

== Track listing ==
All tracks are written by Susan McKeown.

A Winter Talisman track listing
No.	Title	Length
1.	"A Winter Talisman"	1:06
2.	"A Winter Charm of Lasting Life"	1:56
3.	"Langóilí (Langolee)"	2:19
4.	"Mál Bhán Ní Chuilleannáin (Fair Molly Hollywood)"	4:18
5.	"Wexford Mummer's Song"	2:25
6.	"An Urbane Scotsman in Alaska"	1:21
7.	"The Unfortunate Snow Incident"	2:23
8.	"The Bonny Blue-Eyed Lassie"	4:32
9.	"Preab san Ól (In Praise of Drink)"	2:00
10.	"A Christmas Childhood"	1:31
11.	"My Singing Bird"	2:28
12.	"A Mhisg a Chuir an Nollaig Oirnn/Drunk Since Ever I Saw Your Face"	3:00
13.	"As Warm As Winter Snow"	2:57
14.	"Auld Lang Syne"	4:48
Total length:		37:18

== Personnel ==
=== Primary artists ===
- Susan McKeown – lead vocals, arranger, producer
- Johnny Cunningham – arranger, fiddle, piano, producer

=== Production ===
- Aidan Brennan – arranger, guitar, producer
- Robert Burns – composer
- Ray Martin – engineer, mixing
