= Singing in the Dark (album) =

Studio album by Susan McKeown
- Released: October 30, 2010
- Studio: Dubway Studios (New York, New York)
- Genre: Folk, Celtic, pop rock
- Length: 51:08
- Label: Hibernia Records
- Producer: Susan McKeown

Susan McKeown chronology
| Saints & Tzadiks (2009) | Singing in the Dark (2010) | Belong (2012) |

Singing in the Dark is a concept album by Irish folk singer Susan McKeown, released through Hibernia Records on October 30, 2010. According to McKeown, the album is "an exploration of "Creativity & Madness through the lyrics of great poets who were writing through the lens of depression, mania, or substance abuse."

With an introduction by psychologist Kay Redfield Jamison, author of Touched with Fire: Manic-Depressive Illness and the Artistic Temperament, the album features poems by Lord Byron, Anne Sexton, Theodore Roethke, Gwendolyn Brooks, Nuala Ní Dhomhnaill, Gwyneth Lewis, Hayden Carruth, and James Clarence Mangan, as well as songs from John Dowland, Violeta Parra, and Leonard Cohen.

Upon its release, Singing in the Dark received widespread critical acclaim from various media outlets, including The Irish Times, The New York Times, Time Out, El País, The Boston Globe, the Seattle Post-Intelligencer, New Sounds, WNYC, PopMatters, and IrishCentral, among others. Additionally, the Brooklyn Downtown Star included Singing in the Dark on their year-end list of "Top Ten Albums of 2010."

Portions of the proceeds from Sining in the Dark were donated to the National Alliance on Mental Illness, Fountain House, Depression and Bipolar Support Alliance, and Glenn Close's "Bring Change 2 Ming."

== Critical reception ==
Professional ratings
Review scores
| Source | Rating |
|---|---|
| The Irish Times | 4/5 stars |

Singing in the Dark was met with widespread critical acclaim. Siobhán Long, in a review for The Irish Times, awarded the album 4 stars, writing

Ambitious and wilfully jagged-edged, Susan McKeown's 12th album focuses on the intersection where madness, mania, depression and creativity collide—or occasionally, coalesce. Just as Natalie Merchant chose to explore childhood through poetry on last year's Leave Your Sleep, McKeown (a some-time collaborator with Merchant) takes the melancholic words of poets as diverse as Lord Byron, James Clarence Mangan and Theodore Roethke, bathes them in dissonant chords wholly in keeping with their subjects, and then lets them float free, finally untethered from their pages. It's not a collection for the faint of heart, but their riches (both lyrical and musical) unfurl themselves slowly with repeated listening. Making their acquaintance is worth the intense pursuit.

The New York Times was equally enthusiastic, writing "Whether she’s backed by electric and acoustic guitars, accordion or piano, it is Ms. McKeown’s quivering, but relentless voice that dominates the soundscape. This, in turn, pushes the poetry to the forefront."

The Boston Globe observed "Grammy-winning Irish vocalist Susan McKeown wants to bring depression into the light. Her seventh solo album, “Singing in the Dark,’’ explores creativity and mental illness. Drawing from poetry and music by Lord Byron, Theodore Roethke, Anne Sexton, Frank London, Leonard Cohen, and others, McKeown dips into the bleak well of emotional suffering and comes up with a heaping cup of hope."

The Seattle Post-Intelligencer observed "McKeown’s abilities as a performer and her incredible command of her voice allow her to sing one song in an aching tenor and another in a rich alto…I like the irony of her dealing with a topic that’s been subject to so much misconception by shattering a great many of the preconceived notions most people would have had about how this type of material would be presented."

Time Out deemed Singing in the Dark "captivating," while BBC Radio called the album "delightful." WYNC's "Culture blog" featured the track “Mad Sweeney” noting, "Based on a traditional Irish legend first recorded in the 17th century, McKeown’s haunting and enchanting vocals embrace the tale of a king driven wild by illness, who lives life like a bird or beast." Additionally, New Sounds host John Schaefer noted "Singing in the Dark is not a depressing record by any stretch. It ranges from some pretty rollicking stuff to some very folksy sounding tracks like 'Good Old World Blues': set to music by Susan McKeown herself, it really is a terrific song."

== Track listing ==
All tracks composed by Susan McKeown

1. "In A Dark Time" – 3:10
2. "A Woman Like That (Her Kind)" – 4:06
3. "The Nameless One" – 5:36
4. "The Crazy Woman" – 4:33
5. "In Darkness Let Me Dwell" – 3:40
6. "Mad Sweeney" – 5:24
7. "Anthem" (Leonard Cohen) – 5:54
8. "Gracias a la Vida" – 3:57
9. "The Crack in the Stairs" – 3:39
10. "Good Old World Blues" – 4:29
11. "Angel of Depression" – 2:46
12. "So We'll Go No More A-Roving" – 3:49
