= Cathie Ryan =

Irish American singer-songwriter

- Origin: Detroit, Michigan
- Genres: Celtic Folk Roots
- Occupation: Singer-songwriter
- Years active: 1987–present
- Labels: Shanachie (1997–2005); Mo Leanbh (2012–present)
- Formerly of: Cherish the Ladies
- Website: http://www.cathieryan.com

Cathie Ryan is an Irish American singer-songwriter, who has released five CDs and tours steadily with her band performing at festivals, folk clubs, performing arts centers and with symphony orchestras. Known for "her crystalline vocals and insightful songwriting," Cathie Ryan has been one of the leading singers in Celtic music since her start in the 1980s. She first came to prominence in 1987 as lead singer of the Celtic music group, Cherish the Ladies, with whom she recorded two CDs. She began her solo career in 1995.

== Family ==
Ryan is a first generation Irish-American from Detroit, Michigan. Her parents are Mary Ryan (née Rice) from Asdee, County Kerry, and Timothy Ryan from Newport, County Tipperary. She moved to New York City at age seventeen to attend Fordham University. She now resides in County Louth, Ireland.

== Discography ==
- 1997 Cathie Ryan (Shanachie Records)
- 1998 The Music of What Happens (Shanachie Records)
- 2001 Somewhere Along the Road (Shanachie Records)
- 2005 The Farthest Wave (Shanachie Records)
- 2012 Through Wind and Rain (Mo Leanbh Records)

=== Collaborations and other appearances ===
- 1998 "Mother" (North Star Records) with Susan McKeown and Robin Spielberg
- 2002 "Narada Presents: The Best of Celtic Christmas" (Narada Records) various artist
- 2003 "A Woman's Heart – A Decade On" (Dara Records) various artist
