= Straight Outta Ireland =

Compilation album by: The Would Be's; Young Dubliners; Katell Keineg; The Golden Horde; Spirit Merchants; Susan McKeown; Lir; Leslie Dowdall; The Men They Couldn't Hang; Diesel Heart; The Fatima Mansions
- Released: March 9, 1993
- Genre: World music; pop rock
- Length: 42:44
- Label: BMG Rights Management
- Producer: Aiden Foley; Catherine Farley; Jimi Zhivago; Lir Foley

Professional ratings
Review scores
Source	Rating
AllMusic	3/5 stars

Straight Outta Ireland is compilation album featuring the first ever collection of contemporary Irish artists. A play of the 1989 N.W.A album Straight Outta Compton, the project features "the most exceptional new talent to come out of Ireland in the 90's." The album was released by BMG Rights Management on March 9, 1993.

== Track listing ==
Straight Outta Ireland track listing
No.	Title	Writer(s)	Artist	Length
1.	"My Radio Sounds Different in the Dark"	Eamonn Finnegan; Mattie Finnegan	The Would Be's	4:03
2.	"Mama"	Paul O'Toole; Keith Roberts	Young Dubliners	4:58
3.	"Destiny's Darling"	Katell Keineg	Katell Keineg	3:36
4.	"Endless Weekend"	Simon Carmody	The Golden Horde	3:39
5.	"Birdland"	John Ryan	Spirit Merchants	4:02
6.	"If I Were You"	Susan McKeown	Susan McKeown and The Chanting House	3:44
7.	"In a Day"	Ronan Byrne; David Hopkins; Craig Hutchinson; Robert Malone; David McGuinness	Lir	4:59
8.	"Hand on the Water"	Paul Brennan; Leslie Dowdall	Leslie Dowdall	3:52
9.	"You're the One"	Phillip Frederick Odgers	The Men They Couldn't Hang	2:49
10.	"Change of Innocence"	Sean Sweeney	Diesel Heart	3:46
11.	"Valley of the Dead Cars"	Cathal Coughlan	The Fatima Mansions	3:16
Total length:				42:44

== Personnel ==
- Aiden Foley - Engineer, Producer
- Andy Whitmore - Keyboards
- Ann Norda - Photo Illustration
- Arnie Acosta - Mastering
- Bren Holmes - Bass
- Brian Johnson - Design
- Catherine Farley - Compilation Producer, Producer
- Doug Haverty - Art Direction
- Jimi Zhivago - Producer
- Liam Murphy - Programming
- Lir Foley - Producer
- Michelle Meena - Project Consultant
- Oliver Strauss - Engineer
