= 32A =

- Irish release poster
- Directed by: Marian Quinn
- Written by: Marian Quinn
- Produced by: Tommy Weir; Roshanak Behesht Nedjad
- Starring: Ailish McCarthy; Sophie Jo Wasson; Orla Long; Riona Smith; Aidan Quinn; Orla Brady; Jared Harris
- Cinematography: P.J. Dillon
- Edited by: Rune Schweitzer
- Music by: Gerry Leonard
- Production companies: Janey Pictures; Flying Moon
- Release dates: July 13, 2007 (Galway Film Fleadh); August 15, 2008 (Ireland)
- Running time: 89 minutes
- Countries: Ireland; Germany
- Language: English

32A is a 2007 Irish drama film directed and written by Marian Quinn. It was shot principally in Dublin, with additional footage in Roscommon and Sligo.

The script won the inaugural Tiernan McBride Award for screenwriting, as well as Best First Feature on its première at the Galway Film Fleadh. In 2009, the film won an Irish Film and Television Award for cinematography by PJ Dillon. It had its international premiere at the Berlinale '08 film festival.

A female coming-of-age story, the title refers to the protagonist's bra size.

== Plot ==
The story is set in Raheny, Dublin in 1979. The film opens with its heroine, Maeve, putting on her new snow white bra, and stepping out into the world as a young woman. She has an obsession with breasts and bras and can't help but stare at other girls and women, even the head nun doesn’t escape her gaze. Otherwise, her world revolves around her three friends, Ruth, Claire and Orla, who are more experienced in the ways of the world. They wear bras already (except Claire the feminist) and they have all had boyfriends. The new bra is a start but they really hope Maeve can find a fella, even offering kissing lessons to prepare her. What no one expects, least of all Maeve, is that she should snare the local sixteen- year old heartthrob.

Maeve is so smitten with him that she lets her friends down when they need her the most. In trouble with her friends and in school, she gets dumped by the heartthrob when she sneaks into the local dance with him and he leaves with another girl. Her parents find out and she ends up in trouble at home, where she takes on extra domestic duties. She does the laundry and even her bra has lost its former brilliance. Maeve realises what she has lost. Her friends rally round for her 14th birthday, Maeve returns to the fold a little older and a little wiser.

== Cast ==
- Orla Brady as Jean Brennan
- Aidan Quinn as Frank Brennan
- Ailish McCarthy as Maeve Brennan
- Shane McDaid as Brian Power
- Sophie Jo wasson as Ruth Murray
- Orla Long as Orla Kennedy
- Riona Smith as Claire Fox
- Jared Harris as Ruth's Father
- Glynis Casson as Imelda
- Jack Kavanagh as Dessie Brennan
- Patrick FitzGerald as Joe Fox
- Liam Weir as Donal Brennan
- Meadhbh Ni Dhalaigh as Sinead Brennan
- Lucas Neville as Dermot
- Alan O'Neill as Paddy
- Kate O'Toole as Sister Una
