= Wonder Wheel (album) =

Studio album by The Klezmatics
- Released: July 25, 2006
- Recorded: 2005–2006
- Studio: Magic Shop, New York City
- Genre: Klezmer, Folk
- Length: 50:55
- Label: Shout! Studios
- Producer: Nora Guthrie

The Klezmatics chronology
Brother Moses Smote the Water (2004)	Wonder Wheel (2006)	Woody Guthrie's Happy Joyous Hanukkah (2006)

Susan McKeown chronology
Blackthorn: Irish Love Songs (2006)	Wonder Wheel (2006)	Woody Guthrie's Happy Joyous Hanukkah (2006)

Professional ratings
Review scores
Source	Rating
AllMusic	4/5 stars
Robert Christgau	4/5 stars
Klezmer Shack	A+

Wonder Wheel is a 2006 album by neo-Klezmer band The Klezmatics with Susan McKeown. The album was released by Shout! Studios on July 25, 2006. Wonder Wheel features previously unpublished tracks by the legendary folk-singer Woody Guthrie which were unrecorded during his life.

The album achieved critical and commercial success, topping the Billboard World Albums Chart, and winning the 2007 Grammy Award for Best Contemporary World Music Album at the 49th Annual Grammy Awards.

== Track listing ==
All tracks are written by Woody Guthrie.

Wonder Wheel track listing
No.	Title	Length
1.	"Come When I Call You"	4:21
2.	"Mermaid's Avenue"	4:29
3.	"Headdy Down"	4:01
4.	"Gonna Get Through This World"	4:02
5.	"Pass Away"	4:26
6.	"Holy Ground"	4:20
7.	"Goin' Away to Sea"	3:45
8.	"From Here on In"	2:56
9.	"Wheel of Life"	5:23
10.	"Condorbird"	3:26
11.	"Orange Blossom Ring"	3:37
12.	"Heaven"	6:08
Total length:		50:55

== See also ==
- Woody Guthrie Foundation
- Woody Guthrie's Happy Joyous Hanukkah (2006)
- Mermaid Avenue (1998)
- Man in the Sand (1999)
- Mermaid Avenue Vol. II (2000)
- The Works (2008)
- New Multitudes (2012)
- Mermaid Avenue: The Complete Sessions (2012)
