= Bones (Susan McKeown album) =

Studio album by Susan McKeown
- Released: September 17, 1996
- Studio: Prime CD Recording (New York, New York); Mission Sound Studios (Brooklyn, New York)
- Genre: Folk; Celtic; pop rock
- Length: 52:11
- Label: 1-800-Prime-CD
- Producer: Susan McKeown; Jimi Zhivago

Susan McKeown chronology
The Chanting House: LIVE (1992)	Bones (1996)	Through the Bitter Frost and Snow (1997)

Bones is the debut studio album by Susan McKeown & The Chanting House, following two self-released mixtapes. The album was released through indie label 1-800-Prime-CD on September 17, 1996. Produced by McKeown and Jimi Zhivago, Bones features guest appearances from Johnny Cunningham and Jerry O'Sullivan.

The album was met with wide-spread critical acclaim from various media outlets, including AllMusic, Time Magazine, the Los Angeles Times, Rhythm, The Boston Globe, and the New York Daily News. The song "Jericho" was subsequently included in the 1997 compilation album Women Of The World: Celtic II from Putumayo World Music. The track was later featured in the 1999 BBC documentary series The Irish Empire. The song "Westlin Winds" was covered by the band Fairport Convention on their 1999 album The Wood and the Wire. The song "Cé Leis E'?" was featured on The Midnight Special in 2020.

When commenting on the albums' genre in an interview with Billboard, McKeown noted “on Bones, I write songs using the rhythms of jigs and reels, but at the same time they are unmistakably rock songs. Traditional music is dear to me, but it’s up to the new generation to see how it’s carried down.”

== Critical reception ==
Professional ratings
Review scores
Source	Rating
AllMusic	4/5 stars
Encyclopedia of Popular Music	4/5 stars
Rhythm	5/5 stars

Bones was met with critical praise from various media outlets. Rick Anderson, in a review for AllMusic awarded the album 4 stars, writing:

Susan McKeown has one of those voices that takes you by surprise-murmuring and indistinct one moment, then suddenly shuddering to a full-throated, quavering howl that manages always to teeter on the right side of pretty without ever letting you relax completely and get inattentive.

British publication Rhythm named Bones "one of the best releases of 1996," observing “McKeown comes on the scene like a force of nature: a tide of incantory verse and a voice that slays demons... there’s a stateliness in her delivery that suggests she’s in midnight communion with the long-departed spirit of Sandy Denny.”

The Los Angeles Times was equally enthusiastic, noting “A soulful singing feminist, McKeown blends progressive Irish folk music with a harder-edged, pop-rock sensibility. Her album Bones is a stirring work of intense soul-searching.”

The Boston Globe wrote “Equal parts folk-flavored songwriter and alternative rock chanteuse, Susan McKeown’s debut album ’Bones’ is arrestingly original.” While Time Magazine asserted "this is the kind of music that will link Ireland’s musical past with its future."Additionally, Michael Paulson of the New York Daily News noted "(Bones) intimate folk-rock songs, entwined with Irish instrumentation, have an earthy potency."

== Track listing ==
All tracks are written by Susan McKeown.

Bones track listing
No.	Title	Length
1.	"Cé Leis E'?"	4:42
2.	"Albatross"	4:00
3.	"Snakes/Mná na hÉireann"	5:50
4.	"Heart"	3:24
5.	"Westron Wynde/Westlin' Winds"	5:37
6.	"Salomé"	3:56
7.	"Love & Superstition"	4:06
8.	"Gorm"	2:58
9.	"Curiouser"	2:55
10.	"I Know I Know"	4:40
11.	"Strom In A Teacup"	3:15
12.	"Bones"	3:02
Total length:		52:11

== Personnel ==
=== Primary Artist ===
- Susan McKeown – lead vocals, producer, composer, arranger, guitar, bodhrán

=== Musicians ===
- Chris Cunningham – bouzouki, guitar, harmonium
- Eoin Woods – guitar, background vocals
- Jerry O'Sullivan – uilleann pipes
- Jimi Zhivago – bass pedals, dobro, 12-string guitar, mellotron, Hammond organ
- Joe Trump – drums, cymbals, percussion
- Johnny Cunningham – fiddle
- Lindsey Horner – bass, bass clarinet, tin whistle
- Michelle Kinney – cello, background vocals
- Shawn Pelton – cymbals
- Tom Zajac – bagpipes, hurdy-gurdy, sackbut

=== Production ===
- Jimi Zhivago – producer
- Oliver Strauss – digital editing, engineer
- Joe Warda – assistant engineer
- Bill Ritchie – photography
- Kevin Noble – photography
- Carl Wolentarsky – artwork
