= Robin Spielberg =

American pianist, composer and author

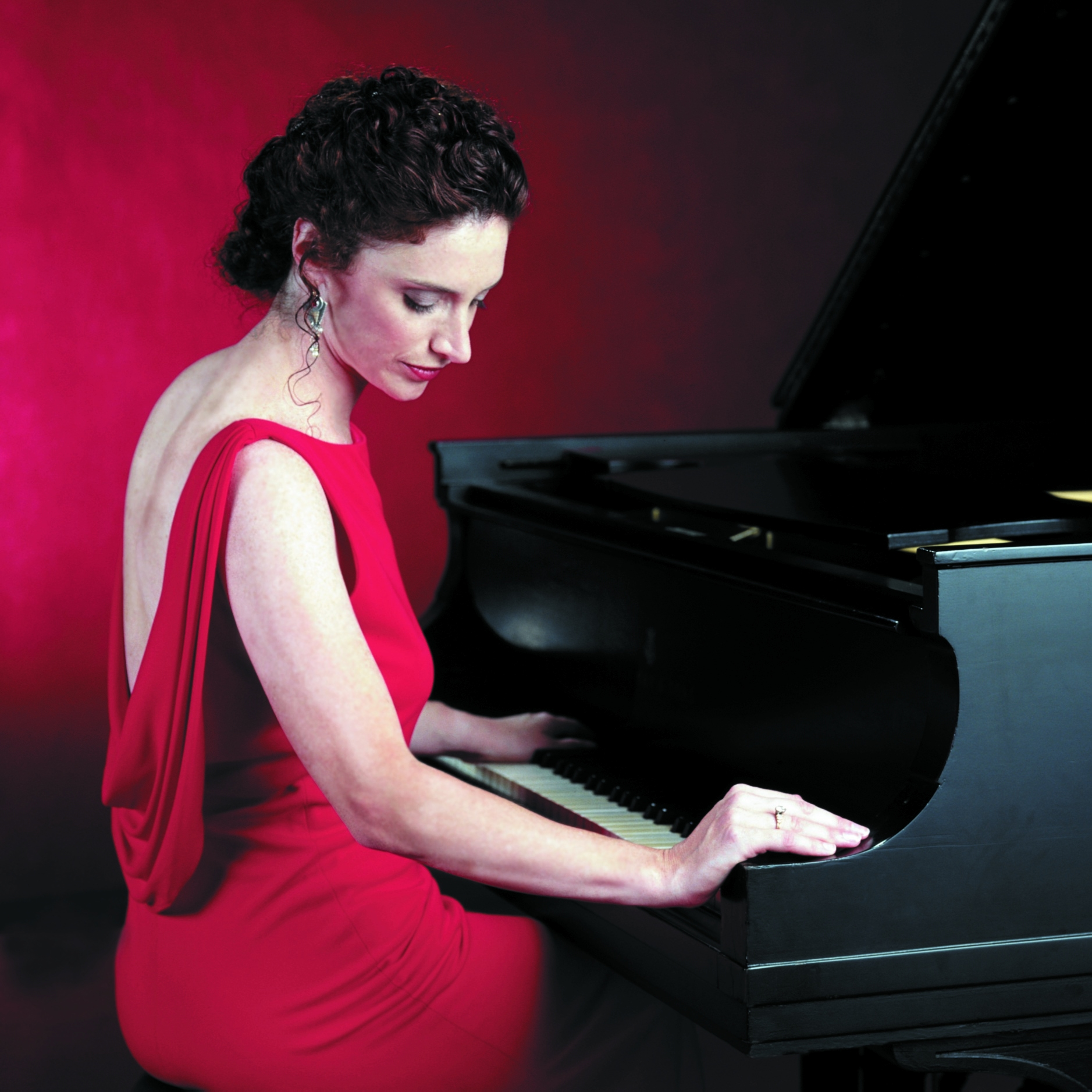
- Born: November 20, 1962 (age 63); New Jersey, U.S.
- Occupations: Pianist, composer
- Years active: 1990s–present
- Spouse: Larry Kosson
- Children: Valerie Kosson
- Musical career
- Genres: Classical crossover; New-age
- Instrument: Piano
- Labels: Northstar Music; playMountain Music
- Website: www.robinspielberg.com

Robin Spielberg (born November 20, 1962) is an American pianist, composer, actress, and author. Her album Downtown charted at #5, and By Way of the Wind charted at #7 on Billboard's Classical Crossover Chart in 2023. Spielberg is a Steinway artist, has performed at Carnegie Hall, and has toured extensively with singer-songwriter Jimmy Webb. She is a founding member of the Atlantic Theater Company, made her off-Broadway debut in Boy's Life at Lincoln Center in 1988, and has performed in radio dramas. Her memoir, Naked on the Bench: My Adventures in Pianoland, received positive reviews and won the Readers' Favorite gold medal in 2014. She gave a TEDx talk titled "The Healing Power of Music" in 2014, and is a spokesperson for the American Music Therapy Association.

== Early life and education ==
Robin Spielberg was raised in the suburban town of Maplewood, New Jersey and began formal piano lessons at the age of seven. She attended Michigan State University and later Tisch School of the Arts at New York University, graduating from NYU with honors and a BFA in Undergraduate Drama.

Her paternal grandfather, Rubin Spielberg, a flutist, and her great-uncle Herman Spielberg, a violinist, were musicians with the NBC Symphony Orchestra under the direction of Arturo Toscanini. Although she never met her grandfather, in her memoir she credits him with providing creative inspiration.

== Career ==
Spielberg is a co-founder of the Atlantic Theater Company and wrote the music for its first musical, Balloonland, in 1991. She has acted in off-Broadway plays including Howard Korder's Boys' Life and The Lights at Lincoln Center, composed music for David Mamet's translation of Three Sisters (directed by William H. Macy), and had roles in two children's plays written by (David Mamet) which aired on NPR. She played piano in hotel lobbies and piano rooms for several years while pursuing her acting career.

In 1993, Spielberg self-released her solo piano debut album, Heal of the Hand, produced by Steven Miller, which was later released by North Star Music. It became their best-selling album in 1994 and 1995. Spielberg was added to the Steinway Artist roster in 1996. In 1997, she made her concert debut in a sold-out performance at Carnegie Hall's Weill Hall. She has released 24 studio albums and has had five top-10 Billboard charting albums. Her music has won Global Music Awards, and has been nominated for a Hollywood Independent Music Award and a Hollywood Music in Media Award. Spielberg's music has been featured on PBS and the History Channel, among others.

Spielberg has toured throughout the United States and Eastern Asia. In 2023, made her orchestral debut as piano soloist with the Brazosport Symphony Orchestra featuring her original work for full symphony, By Way of the Wind.

Her memoir, Naked on the Bench: My Adventures in Pianoland, received positive reviews, with Kirkus calling it "a well-paced musical memoir about the value of perseverance".

== Billboard album charts ==
Year	Title	
Year	Title	US
2018	On the Edge of a Dream: Piano Solos For Dreaming	6
2020	Love Story	11
2021	Give My Regards to Broadway	7
2023	Downtown	5
2023	By Way of the Wind	7

== Awards ==
Year	Nominated work	Category	Award	Result
2024	"Flying"	Icon Award Winner/Best Classical Crossover Song/Best Production	Intercontinental Music Awards	Won
2024	"Ireland: An Orchestral Portrait" (music video)	Best Original Score	Swedish International Film Festival	Won
2024	"By Way of the Wind"	Best Classical Crossover Album	Radio Music Awards	Won
2023	"Best in Music Genre"	Contemporary Classical	Hollywood Independent Music Award	Nominated
2023	"Best in Music Genre"	Best Classical Song	Clouzine Award	Won
2023	"By Way of the Wind"	Contemporary Classical	Global Music Award (Gold Medal)	Won
2022	"Ireland: An Orchestral Portrait"	Classical Crossover, Orchestral Arrangement	Global Music Award (Silver Medal)	Won
2022	"Best in Music Genre"	Epic, Orchestral	Hollywood Music in Media Award	Nominated
2018	"On the Edge of a dream"	Album of the Year	Whisperings Solo Piano Radio	Nominated
2015	"Another Time, Another Place"	Album of the Year	Whisperings Solo Piano Radio	Nominated
2014	"Naked on the Bench: My Adventures in Pianoland"	Readers Choice	Gold Medal	Won
1988	"Boy's Life"	Outstanding Ensemble Performance	Drama Desk Award	Nominated

== Theater ==
Spielberg is a founding member of the Atlantic Theater Company, and acted in dozens of plays with the company, including Boys' Life (which was nominated for a Drama Desk award for Outstanding Ensemble Performance) and The Lights by Howard Korder at Lincoln Center. She composed music for several Atlantic Theater Company productions, including the David Mamet adaptation of Three Sisters directed by William H. Macy, and two children's plays written by David Mamet airing on National Public Radio (NPR): The Poet and the Rent and The Revenge of the Space Pandas. In 1992, Spielberg and Barry Shulak co-wrote a musical for young audiences entitled Balloonland. Originally produced in Vermont by the Atlantic Theater Company, Balloonland later debuted off-Broadway on ATC's New York City stage in 1993.

== Albums and awards ==
As of 2023, Spielberg had recorded 24 albums and appeared on over 50 compilations.

Her debut album of original piano solos entitled Heal of the Hand was recorded independently in 1993. The album was picked up by the indie label North Star Music in 1994, and became their best-selling CD of the decade. According to North Star president Richard Waterman, Spielberg sold between 160,000 and 200,000 albums during 1995 and 1996, although SoundScan only registered 1,800 sales, with the bulk of sales through specialist outlets. By 1999 she had reportedly sold 300,000 albums.

Spielberg's original 1994 agreement with North Star Music was a six-record deal, covering recording and release of two albums per year over the course of three years. During this period, the following titles were released under the North Star label: Heal of the Hand (1993), Spirit of the Holidays (1994) featuring Christmas-themed tracks, Unchained Melodies (1995), In the Heart of Winter (1995), Songs of the Spirit (1996), and In the Arms of the Wind (1997). Additional titles subsequently released by North Star include Mother (1999) and Spa Piano (2007). The former is a collaboration with singers Susan McKeown and Cathie Ryan featuring songs celebrating motherhood. When North Star folded in 2011, Spielberg bought back the masters for her albums released under that label.

Beginning in 2000, Spielberg started releasing albums under her own playMountain Music label. These include Beautiful Dreamer (2000), Dreaming of Summer (2000), The Christmas Collection (2002), American Chanukah (2002), With a Song in My Heart (2004), Memories of Utopia (2005), A New Kind of Love (2008), Sea to Shining Sea: A Tapestry of American Music (2010), Another Time, Another Place (2015), On The Edge Of A Dream: Piano Solos For Dreaming (2018), Love Story (2020), Re-Inventions (2020), Give My Regards to Broadway (2021), Downtown (2022), and By Way of the Wind (2023).

Another Time, Another Place was nominated for a Zone Music Award. On May 7, 2016, Spielberg performed at the awards show at the Joy Theater New Orleans, Louisiana. The album was also nominated for a Whisperings Solo Piano Radio Award and a One World Music Radio award in the UK.

In March 2018 Spielberg debuted at number 6 in the Billboard New Age chart with her album On the Edge of a Dream: Piano Solos For Dreaming. The CD was ranked number 7 on the Zone Music Reporter radio charts for the months of June and July 2018.

During 2022 she was nominated by the Hollywood Music in Media Awards for her epic piece Ireland: An Orchestral Portrait. The piece won Clouzine International Magazine's award for "Best Classical Song" in 2023, and a silver medal for Best Orchestral Arrangement and Best Classical Crossover composition at the Global Music Awards.

In June 2023 Spielberg's piano arrangements of nostalgic pop songs, Downtown, debuted at #5 on Billboard's Classical Crossover chart.

By Way of the Wind, Spielberg's fully orchestrated album of original works, debuted on Billboard's Classical Crossover chart at #8 on November 4, 2023, and remained on the chart for three weeks. The Brazosport Symphony Orchestra, under the baton of Brian Casey, premiered the entire collection of work on By Way of the Wind on November 12, 2023, with Spielberg as soloist. In December 2023, Global Music Awards designated Spielberg a Gold Medal Winner in the category Contemporary Classical - Composer for By Way of the Wind.

In addition to her recording career, Spielberg served as an inaugural member of the Independent Music Awards' judging panel.

Spielberg was added to the Steinway Artist roster in 1996.

== Performances ==
Spielberg tours both nationally and overseas. Performance highlights within the United States include three sold-out performances at the Weill Recital Hall at Carnegie Hall (New York City). Overseas, she has toured South Korea three times, appearing at KBS Hall, Seoul Arts Center, and the LG Arts Center (2010).

Spielberg is signed with Sony/ATV Music Publishing in Asia, and her piece "An Improvisation on the Canon in D" is used in the soundtrack of the South Korean television drama series Winter Sonata.

In January 2015 Spielberg began opening for the renowned songwriter Jimmy Webb at the Sharp Theater in Mahwah, New Jersey. She remained his preferred opener for six years.

In July 2019, the Chinese Ministry of Culture and Tourism invited Spielberg to perform concerts and give piano performance master classes and workshops. The three-week tour included performances in the Zhejiang Province at the Hangzhou Grand Theater, the Keqiao Lantian Grand Theatre, the Longquan Grand Theatre, the Xiangshan Theatre, the Changxing Grand Theatre, the Gengsu Theater in Jiangsu, the Puxian Grand Theatre in Fujian Province, and MAO Livehouse in Shanghai.

== Music therapy ==
The importance of music therapy is a recurring theme throughout Spielberg's career. She is a national celebrity artist spokesperson for the American Music Therapy Association. As spokesperson, she often conducts seminars and workshops on the transformative power of music in hospitals, schools and community centers while on tour. She has also performed fundraisers for medical and other charities. In 2014 Spielberg gave a talk titled "The Healing Power of Music" at Lancaster, Pennsylvania's inaugural TEDx event.

== Writing ==
Spielberg is author of the memoir Naked on the Bench (2013), which Kirkus called a "well-paced musical memoir about the value of perseverance" which avoids sentimentality and balances happy moments with darker content such as being stalked. Spielberg also writes about music therapy in her memoir.

== Teaching ==
In 2016, Spielberg began teaching at Millersville University as an instructor in the music business technology department, teaching Careers in the Music Business and International Music Business. While on tour, Spielberg often gives master classes and workshops on "Overcoming Performance Anxiety," as well as "Music and Mental Health."

== Discography ==
- Heal of the Hand (1993)
- Spirit of the Holidays (1994)
- Unchained Melodies (1995)
- In the Heart of Winter (1995)
- Songs of the Spirit (1996)
- In the Arms of the Wind (1997)
- Mother (1999)
- Beautiful Dreamer (2000)
- Dreaming of Summer (2000)
- The Christmas Collection (2002)
- American Chanukah (2002)
- With a Song in My Heart (2004)
- Memories of Utopia (2005)
- Spa Piano (2007)
- A New Kind of Love (2008)
- Sea to Shining Sea: A Tapestry of American Music (2010)
- Another Time, Another Place (2015)
- On the Edge of A Dream (2018)
- Love Story (2020)
- Re-Inventions (2020)
- Give My Regards to Broadway (2021)
- All the Best Returns, Part 1 (2022)
- Downtown (2022)
- By Way of the Wind (2023)

== Sources ==
- Spielberg, Robin, Naked on the Bench: My Adventures in Pianoland, A Memoir, Spobs Music Incorporated 2013; ISBN 978-0970563354
