= Blackthorn: Irish Love Songs =

Studio album by Susan McKeown
- Released: March 14, 2006
- Studios: Marguerite Studios (Dublin, Ireland) Mission Sound (Brooklyn, NY)
- Genres: Folk, Celtic, World
- Length: 43:59
- Label: World Village
- Producer: Susan McKeown

Susan McKeown chronology
Sweet Liberty (2004)	Blackthorn: Irish Love Songs (2006)	Wonder Wheel (2006)

Blackthorn: Irish Love Songs is a studio album by Irish folk singer Susan McKeown. It was released through World Village on March 14, 2006. The album is known for its sensual arrangements of often melancholic songs, with tracks like "Oíche Fá Fhéil' Bríde" (On Brigid's Eve), "An Draighneán Donn" (The Blackthorn Tree), and "The Lass of Aughrim." While promoting the album, McKeown commented "“To me, these love songs maintain their relevance even today. They express emotions that we all understand. And while they might be old, the subject of love remains universal and contemporary to us all.”

Blackthorn: Irish Love Songs was met with positive reviews from various music trade publications, including AllMusic, Global Rhythm, Soundstage, and RootsWorld.

== Critical reception ==
Professional ratings
Review scores
Source	Rating
AllMusic	3.5/5 stars

Blackthorn: Irish Love Songs was met with mostly positive review from music critics. Trade publication AllMusic awarded the album 3.5/5 stars.

Global Rhythm praised Blackthorn, writing "Dublin's Susan McKeown is no ordinary Celtic singer. Her lilting vocals, whether in Irish or English, are full of personality… Blackthorn , her ninth and latest album is a triumph.”

RootsWorld was equally enthusiastic, writing

Her voice can penetrate like a newly sharpened knife blade, but since this is a selection of love songs, Susan McKeown turns up the tenderness as well. She no doubt knows that albums of traditional Irish music are nothing new, so she makes these songs her own. Whether soaring gracefully through the Venezuelan harp-accompanied "Oiche Fa Fheil," accentuating the sing-along chipperness of "Do In Du" or laying bare unfettered emotion on "The Lass of Aughrim," McKeown rises above the ordinary. The arrangements and instrumentation borrow from Basque, Latin, Scottish and other non-Irish sources (even pre-Columbian Amerindian), accounting for an unforced cross-cultural quality that is another of this recording's strengths... The liner notes do some philosophical waxing on the nature of the album's subject matter, though it is the music that makes it clear these are love songs to truly love.

Soundstage, observed "A variety of love songs fills this album, expressing joy, lamenting betrayal, and revealing jealousy. The melodies and tempos vary accordingly, as do the arrangements. A quick favorite of mine was "Dó Ín Dú" ("The Things in Your Heart") with its peppy mixed rhythms and light background vocals. The use of harp lends special poignancy to several songs.This is a recording with no weak tracks or players. Fiddle, bouzouki, guitar, mandolin, and percussion all lend force to McKeown's vocals instead of calling too much attention to themselves. Production is clear, unpretentious, and immediate: Close your eyes and you could be in the same room with these artists."

== Track listing ==
All tracks are composed by Susan McKeown.

1. Oíche Fá Fhéil' Bríde (On Brigid's Eve)
2. A Maid Going to Comber (The Red And Black)
3. Dó Ín Dú (The Things In Your Heart)
4. Maidin Fhomhair (One Morning In Autumn/Princess Royal)
5. Bean Pháidín (Paudeen's Woman)
6. An Draighneán Donn (The Blackthorn Tree)
7. Caleno Custure Me (I Am A Girl From The Suir Side)
8. The Lass of Aughrim
9. Déirín Dé (The Last of the Light)
10. An Raibh Tú Ag An gCarraig? (Were You At Carrick?)
11. 'S Ambó Éara (The Man For Me)
12. An Droighneán Donn (The Blackthorn Tree)

== Personnel ==
- Susan McKeown - Arranger, Liner Notes, Photography, Producer
- Cormac Breatnach - Low Whistle
- Dana Lyn - Fiddle, Harmonium, Viola
- Don Meade - Harmonica
- Eamon O'Leary - Banjo, Bouzouki, Guitar, Guitar (Electric), Mandolin
- Edmar Castañeda - Harp
- Eithne Ní Uallacháin - Arranger
- Harkaitz Martinez - Txalaparta
- Júlio Andrade - Engineer
- Lindsey Horner - Bass
- Rick Rowe - Mastering
- Róisín Chambers - Vocals
- Steve Cooney - Arranger, Guitar
- Trevor Hutchinson - Engineer
- Xuacu Amieva - Rabel
