= Gráda =

Irish music band

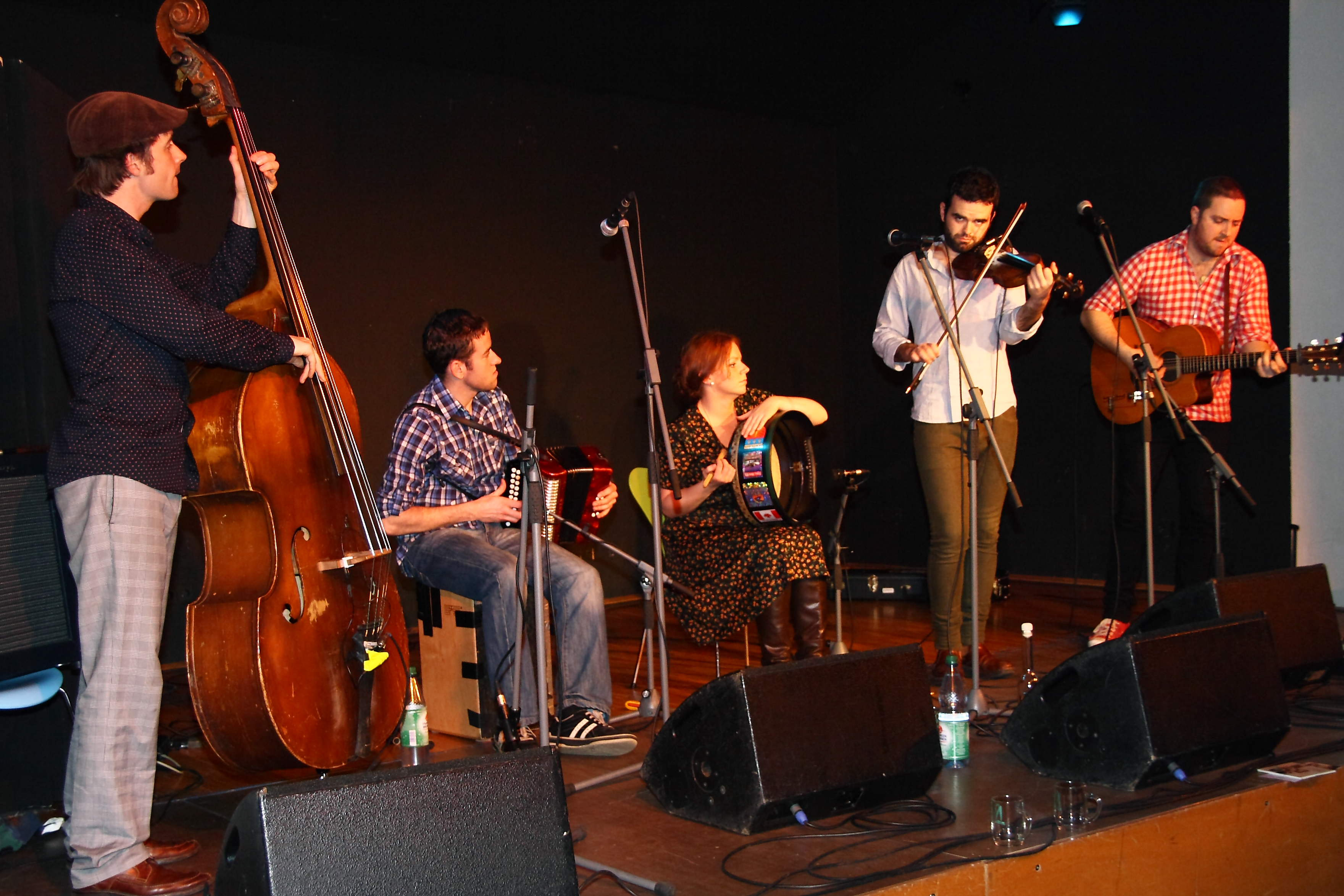
- Gráda at Kult, Niederstetten, 2010

Background information
- Genres: Irish folk, Celtic
- Years active: 2001–2011
- Label: Compass
- Members: Andrew Laking; Nicola Joyce; Gerry Paul; Alan Doherty; Tola Custy
- Past members: Anne Marie O'Malley; Brendan O'Sullivan; Colin Farrell; David Doocey; Stephen Doherty
- Website: gradamusic.ie

Gráda is a traditional Irish music band founded in 2001 whose members are a mix of Irish and New Zealand musicians. Based in Dublin and Galway, Ireland, Gráda have spent much of their time touring internationally. In 2011, members of Gráda disbanded to work on individual projects. The band reformed in 2020 to play a concert in New Zealand and were joined by Tola Custy. In October 2023 they reformed to embark on a nine date tour of New Zealand, to be followed by dates in Ireland

== Musical career ==
The group draws from a wide range of influences, which has seen them working with Dave Hingerty (Kíla, The Frames, The Swell Season); Vyviene Long (cellist with Damien Rice); and, as a producer, Trevor Hutchinson (Lúnasa, Sharon Shannon, The Waterboys). Further additions have included Dublin based trumpeter Bill Blackmore and percussionist Rasmus Skovmand.

In 2008, it was announced Colin Farrell had decided to leave the band. He was replaced by multi-instrumentalist David Doocey. In April 2009, Alan Doherty left the band and was replaced by Stephen Doherty (no relation). Alan returned to the group in 2011.

== Charts and critical reception ==
Gráda have received critical acclaim, with their latest album Natural Angle being voted as one of the top folk albums of 2010 in the USA by NPR / Folk Alley and the IMA music awards. Their previous album, Cloudy Day Navigation appeared multiple times in Irish Music's Top 10 charts. Gráda have received glowing reviews from Irish Music, Sing Out!, The Irish Times, The Evening Herald and The Event Guide.

== Band members ==
- Andrew Laking – (double bass, vocals)
- Nicola Joyce– (vocals, bodhrán)
- Gerry Paul – (acoustic and electric guitars, bouzouki, vocals)
- Alan Doherty – (flutes, whistle, vocals)
- Tola Custy - (fiddle, vocals)

=== Former members ===
- Anne Marie O'Malley – vocals and bodhrán (2001–2006)
- Brendan O'Sullivan – fiddle, viola, and vocals (2001–2005)
- Colin Farrell – (fiddle, vocals) (2006–2008)
- David Doocey – (Fiddle, Concertina, and Whistles) (2008-2011)
- Stephen Doherty – (Flute) (2009-2011)

== Discography ==
- Off to Sardinia – 2001 (out of production)
- Endeavour – 2002
- The Landing Step – 2004
- Cloudy Day Navigation – 2007
- Natural Angle – 2010 (Compass)
