= Áine Minogue =

- Born: 27 May 1977 (age 49); Borrisokane, County Tipperary, Ireland
- Genres: Celtic; world; folk; new age; spiritual
- Occupations: Musician; singer-songwriter; composer; arranger
- Instruments: Harp, vocals
- Years active: 1994–present
- Labels: RCA Victor, BMG, Sounds True
- Website: www.aineminogue.com

Áine Minogue (born 27 May 1977, Borrisokane, County Tipperary) is an Irish harpist, singer, arranger, and composer, now living in the Boston area. She has recorded thirteen solo albums in styles generally categorized as Celtic, world, folk, spiritual, and new age.

== Early life ==
Áine Minogue was born in Ireland to a family of ten, which often played and sang at traditional Irish events such as fleadhs and Hunting the Wren. She was 12 when she started playing the Irish harp at a boarding school in Galway. Minogue became a harpist at Bunratty Castle in County Clare. She obtained a Master's Degree in Traditional Irish Harp Performance from the University of Limerick. She moved to Boston in 1990.

== Music career ==
Minogue's debut album, Were You at the Rock, consisted of traditional dance and concert pieces.

Mysts of Time (1996) was a mix of traditional tunes and original songs, with mostly Gaelic lyrics. It was seen as belonging to the Irish wave of New Age/Celtic fusion and associated with the sound of Enya. Her voice was described as "fragile, lilting... like a gently windblown satin sheet." To Warm the Winter's Night (1996) was a popular collection of Celtic and English midwinter and Christmas music.

Circle of the Sun (1998) was a musical journey through the seasons with a focus on the four Celtic calendar festivals of Lughnasadh, Samhain, Imbolc, and Beltane. She mixed her own Celtic harp with guitars, cellos, fiddles, flutes, and bodhráns, but also folk instruments from other traditions such as didgeridoo and djembe. Celtic Lamentations (2005) explored how ancient people used music to mourn. It won Zone Music Reporter's Best Celtic Album award.

A Winter's Journey, a CatholicTV Christmas special produced by Minogue where she plays Celtic music with her friends in the Cathedral of the Holy Cross in Boston, was nominated for a New England Emmy Award.

== Discography ==
=== Solo albums ===
Year	Title	Label
1994	Were You at the Rock	Beacon Records
1996	Mysts of Time	North Star Music
1996	To Warm Winter's Night	Evergreen Music Recordings / Music Design
1997	Between the Worlds	RCA Victor / RCA
1998	Circle of the Sun	RCA
1999	Vow: An Irish Wedding Celebration	North Star Music
2004	The Twilight Realm	Little Miller Music
2004	Celtic Meditation Music	Gemini Sun / Sounds True
2005	Celtic Lamentations	Gemini Sun / Sounds True
2008	Celtic Pilgrimage	Gemini Sun / Sounds True
2012	Close Your Eyes, Love: Lullabies of the Celtic Lands	CD Baby
2014	Winter a Meditation	Self-published
2017	In the Name of Stillness	Little Miller Music
2019	Epiphany: Celtic Christmas Music	Little Miller Music

=== With Druidstone (band) ===
- Vow: an Irish Wedding Celebration (1999)
- The Spirit of Christmas

=== Collaborations and compilations ===
- (Various Artists), Celtic Visions (RCA Victor/BMG)
- (Various Artists), "Sacred Spirit" Celtic Twilight (Hearts of Space)
- (Various Artists), Celtic Wave (Sony/BMG)
- (Various Artists), Dublin to Dakar (Putumayo)
- (Various Artists), Echoes Living Room Series, Vol. 4
- (Various Artists), A Winter's Tale (Universal)
- (Various Artists), "Celtic Lullaby" (Putumayo)
- (Various Artists), Exotica – World Music Divas (BMG Classics)
- (Various Artists), Celtic Heartbeat Christmas (Decca)
- (Various Artists), "European Playground" (Putumayo)
- (Various Artists), Celtic Christmas II (Windham Hill/BMG)
- (Various Artists), "Highlands IV" (Warner Bros)
- (Various Artists), "A Celtic Heartbeat Christmas" (Atlantic)
- (Various Artists), Celtic Spirit (Narada/Virgin)
- (Various Artists), Celtic Love (JVC Victor)
- (Various Artists), "Celtic Christmas" (Putumayo)
- (Various Artists), "Still" (Echoes)
- (Various Artists), "Celtic Dreamland" (Putumayo)
- (Various Artists), "Comfort & Joy" (Rounder)
- (Various Artists), "A Christmas Celtic Sojourn" (Rounder)
- (Various Artists), "Exotica, World Music Divas" (RCA Victor/BMG)
- John O'Donohue "To Bless the Space Between Us" (Sounds True)
- John O'Donohue, "Soul Friend/Anam Chara" spoken word (Sounds True)

=== Special projects & collaborations ===
- Tommy Makem Ancient Pulsing (PBS/TV and CD)
- Tommy Makem's Ireland (PBS/TV)
- John O'Donohue, "Soul Friend/Anam Chara" spoken word (Sounds True)
- Michael Dowling, Artist installation "Freshwater"
- Stirling Harris The Little Horse That Could (soundtrack)
- Wilfred E. Richard, Photographer The Four Seasons/Hidden Landscapes (soundtrack)
- Dr. Ray Shea Yeats Country (soundtrack)
