= Jerry O'Sullivan (musician) =

Irish-American contemporary musician

- Born: 19 June 1959 (age 67); New York City, New York, United States
- Occupation: Instrumentalist
- Instrument: Bagpipes
- Website: www.jerryosullivan.com

Jerry O'Sullivan is an American musician.

O'Sullivan was born in New York City on 19 June 1959. As a youngster he learned Great Highland bagpipes. Following a visit to his cousins in Dublin he took up uilleann pipes. He became a member of Green Fields of America in the 1980s, rubbing shoulders with Seamus Egan, Eileen Ivers and Mick Moloney.

He has appeared on over 90 albums, including Dolly Parton's Heartsongs: Live from Home, Susan McKeown's Bones, and two albums by Eileen Ivers – Wild Blue (1996) and Crossing the Bridge (1999).

He has recorded five solo albums, including The Invasion in 1987, The Gift in 1998, and O'Sullivan Meets O'Farrell in 2005.

O'Sullivan Meets O'Farrell: Volume II was recorded in February 2008 in Newport, Rhode Island, with baroque cellist Audrey Sabattier-Cienniwa and harpsichordist Paul Cienniwa playing basso continuo. It was released in July 2010.

O'Sullivan in 2018 self-released The Killasser Flute / An Fheadóg Mhór Chill Lasrach, a collection of flute music he recorded after receiving two flutes as gifts from Killasser-based flutemaker Michael Cronnolly.

== Discography ==
=== As leader ===
- The Invasion (1987)
- The Gift (1998)
- O'Sullivan Meets O'Farrell (2005)
- O'Sullivan Meets O'Farrell: Volume II (2010)
- The Killasser Flute / An Fheadóg Mhór Chill Lasrach (2018)

=== As sideman ===
- Live in America by Green Fields of America (1989)
- Four Marys by Rebecca Pidgeon (1999)
- Crossing the Bridge by Eileen Ivers (1999)
- Celtic Solstice by Paul Winter
- The Border of Heaven by Connie Dover (2000)
- Copper: Original Soundtrack by Brian Keane (2013)
