= Mike Boehm =

American music critic and arts reporter (1955–2019)

- Born: October 23, 1955; Connecticut, U.S.
- Died: May 2, 2019 (aged 63)
- Education: Yale University; Columbia University Graduate School of Journalism
- Occupations: Music critic, arts reporter

Mike Boehm (October 23, 1955 - May 2, 2019) was an American music critic and arts reporter. He wrote for the Los Angeles Times from 1988 to 2015.
