= Green Man Review =

American web magazine

- Website type: Books, music and other media reviews
- Available in: English
- Headquarters: {{{location_country}}}
- Industry: Online magazine
- Website: greenmanreview.com agreenmanreview.com
- Launched: 2000

The Green Man Review (abbreviated GMR) was a web magazine operating from 2000 onward that specialized in reviews for books, music, and other media. The publication derived its name from the folklore figure of the Green Man, which is often associated with nature and rebirth. It was known for in-depth reviews of speculative fiction and film including video, folk music and live performances, and folklore. Kinrowan Ltd., a music consultancy group, published it.

Jane Yolen, an American writer of fantasy, science fiction, and children's books, known for The Devil's Arithmetic, a Holocaust novella, includes an excerpt from the magazine on her author site.

The publication was cited in The Year's Best Science Fiction, Twelfth Annual Collection and also cited in The Year's Best Science Fiction: Twenty-Fourth Annual Collection among other publications such as The New York Review of Science Fiction, The Magazine of Fantasy & Science Fiction, and Interzone.

Dark Horse Comics lists GMR in its index of reviews for comic B.P.R.D., Vol. 8: Killing Ground.

The Green Man Review all-volunteer staff was collectively responsible for the design and content of the magazine. Reviews were written by staff with compensation consisting of the review item itself.

The December 18, 2002, GMR masthead listed the leading editorial staff as consisting of Cat Eldridge (Editor and Publisher), Asher Black (Managing Editor), who was later responsible for MYTHOLOG, and Grey Walker (Aigne), as well as 49 staff writers, editors, proofers, and assistants. At the height of the publication, there were 70 staff writers.

The publication was updated weekly, adding an average of thirty new reviews, divided between books and music, with the occasional live performance review, video review, or essay or column. The GMR archives consisted, until 2015, of over two thousand reviews.

In 2011, the magazine shifted to a blog format without a traditional masthead. That continued at least until September 5, 2015. By January 9, 2016, the original site became a placeholder, and the blog was moved by September 5, 2020, to a new domain where it has continued with an editorial staff of five.

== Notable publications ==
- In 2008, The Green Man Review published the audio of Peter S. Beagle's work The Stickball Witch, available on SFFaudio. In 2010, GMR produced a special Peter S. Beagle issue.
- In 2010, The Green Man Review produced a trailer for indie folk rock band Cats Laughing, which provided the soundtrack, along with The Flash Girls for the trailer for Emma Bull's novel War for the Oaks which was directed by author Will Shetterly and is viewable on YouTube.

== Early history ==
The Green Man Review: Roots & Branches of Music and Literature, formerly known as Folk Tales, existed as a print-based newsletter for over twenty-five years before moving to an exclusively-online format. Originally, the print publication was part of the Portland Folk Club in Portland, Maine, where it was known as Mostly Folk and then later as Folk Tales. [The name was changed in 1995 from Mostly Folk to Folk Tales to avoid confusion with a local folk music radio program called Mostly Folk].

The publication's early focus was on trad music, a genre of traditional music, including Celtic and English traditions and American roots music (such as Cajun, contradance, bluegrass, old-timey and country).

GMR is quoted extensively by Tachyon Publications for reviews of books like Patricia A. McKillip’s Dreams of Distant Shores.
