= Folk Next Door =

Concert and CD series

The Folk Next Door was the name of a concert series and CD releases produced on by WWUH, the University of Hartford radio station in West Hartford, CT, USA. There were nine concerts and CDs in all, one each year starting in 1991. Featured artists included Sloan Wainright, Dar Williams, Hugh Blumenfeld, The Nields, Please and Thank You Band, Lui Collins, Dewey Burns, Bruce Pratt, Kate McDonnell and Freddie Tane, The Hartford Gospel All Stars, Catie Curtis, and Dave Drouillard.

== Discography ==
Track/Artist/Title

=== Folk Next Door 1 ===
1. Lui Collins Friendship Waltz
2. The Patons Come Love Come
3. Dewey Burns Just How Long
4. Please and Thank You Band Pittsburgh Medley
5. McDonnell Tane Ordinary Man
6. Heartwood I Give You Light
7. Donna Martin The Shirt Off My Back
8. Last Fair Deal Out of My Mind
9. Amy Davis & Dan Gardella Take Me to the Zydeco Dance
10. Hugh Blumenfeld Waiting for the Good Humor Man
11. Steve Nystrup Canary Island
12. Dave Drouillard Oh, Sweet Mary
13. Richard Shindell Home Team
14. John Whelan Gan Aimn
15. Bruce Pratt Drivin' Through the Delta
16. Don Sineti The Dreadnought
17. Stan Sullivan The Passing Lane
18. Delta Boogie May We All Shout Together
19. Zydeco Zombies Ossan Two-Step
20. The Nields Anchorman

=== Folk Next Door 2 ===
"Honey Hide The Banjo Its The Folk Next Door Again!"

1. Dar Williams The Babysitter's Here
2. Kate McDonnell Seeking Passage
3. Catie Curtis Slave to My Belly
4. Robin Lawlor Francesca
5. Ellen Cross The Letters
6. Grassroots Bill Cheatham
7. J.P. Jones Bold Troubador
8. Hugh Blumenfeld & Ed Smith Friends of a Traveler
9. Donna Martin Coming Home
10. Lui Collins Step Into the Water
11. Hartford Gospel Stars 99½ Won't Do
12. Barbara Kessler Happy With You
13. Peter Lehndorff East Longmeadow
14. Eric Von Schmidt Champagne Don't Hurt Me Baby
15. Please and Thank You Band Katy Hill
16. Bruce Pratt The Unknown
17. The Nields (Just Like Christopher Columbus)

=== Folk Next Door III ===
"Hoot"

1. Chanting House Salome
2. Madwoman In the Attic Oconee
3. Peter Lehndorff Marriage
4. J.P. Jones Moving Train
5. Jeter La Ponte L2 Jeune Marie'e
6. Lucy Kaplansky You Just Need a Home
7. Steve Nystrup Weasel
8. Kim Trusty Keep On Moving
9. Peg Loughran The Traveler
10. Patrick McGinley St. Patrick's Isle
11. Gypsy Reel White Face Waltz
12. Ed Smith I Got a Tune
13. Madwoman In the Attic Nothing Like Food
14. Amy Gallatin Forever Ride
15. Tim Cote Television
16. Gospel Stars He Will Understand
17. Dar Williams February

=== Folk Next Door IV ===
"Local Color"

1. Greg Greenway Ghost Dance
2. Erica Wheeler Arrow Heads
3. Michael Jerling Starting Tomorrow
4. New Middle Class I'll Rock Your Candle
5. Jim Henry Baby's Coming Home
6. Kate McDonnell Drink the Rain
7. Dave Drouillard American Flyer
8. Travor Hollow Parallax
9. Sally Rogers Hard Work
10. Andrew Calhoun Tunnelvision
11. Madwoman In the Attic These Eyes
12. Hugh Blumenfeld Mozart's Money
13. Les Sampou Holyland
14. Cyd Slotteroff At Last
15. Bobbi Carmitchell Life on the Greener Side
16. Susanne McDermott Farther Still
17. Greg Greenway Crack in the Wall
18. Travor Hollow You Don't Call Me Darling Anymore

=== Folk Next Door V ===
"Cicada"

1. Sloan Wainwright Band Hey Girl
2. Cordelia's Dad Katy Cruel
3. Ratsy Bell Bottomed Lunch Box
4. Gabriel Dorman I Am God Just a little Bit
5. Chilo Simple
6. Salamander Crossing Trip Me Up
7. Dana Pomfret Tricks on You
8. Bayou Brethem Port Arthur Blues
9. Nancy Tucker Everything Reminds Me of My Therapist
10. Morrigu Jane's Reel/ A Punch In the Dark
11. Stan Sullivan Dark Belgian Chocolate
12. St. Patrick's Pipe Band Gardens of Skye/ Over the Sea to Skye/ Within A Mile of Edinburgh Town/ The Waters of Kylesku/ Molly Darling
13. Cordelia's Dad A Sailor's Life
14. Chilo That Hair

=== Folk Next Door VI ===
"The Emperor of Ice Cream"

1. Karen Savoca and Pete Heitzman You Just Don't Get It
2. Jeremy Wallace Johnny
3. Lisa McCormick Right Now
4. Don Sineti and Chris Morgan John Kanaka
5. Jano Cowboy King
6. The Mollys Pride Over Dollars
7. The Muster Bunch Tatter Jack/ Drums and Guns
8. Dana Robinson Wishing Tree
9. Scott McAllistar, Meredith Cooper, Jeff Mucciolo Seaside Jig
10. Ratsy Leave Her Behind
11. Washboard Slim and the Blue Lights Firehouse Blues
12. Ilene Weiss Answer to Come
13. Sloan Wainwright Band For My Pride
14. Sloan Wainwright Band No One's Makin' Me Do It
15. Ratsy Don't Judge the Herd
16. Ilene Weiss Woman of a Calm Heart

=== Folk Next Door VII ===
"May Day"

1. Beth Amsel Saint Mark
2. Tom Prasado-Rao Walk A Million Miles
3. Peter Lehndorff Peugot
4. Chris and Meredith Thompson House Divided
5. Mark Mulcahy Tempted
6. Justina and Joyce Sip of Water
7. Gideon Freudmann Adobe Dog House
8. Hugh Blumenfeld Bill's Dick
9. Darryl Purpose Child of Hearts
10. Erin McKeown Fast as I Can
11. Jeremy Wallace Missing you this Morning
12. Louise Taylor Deep, Dark River
13. Erica Wheeler Nowhere to Go
14. Stephen Nystrup Come on the Road
15. Lost Wages Tarpology

=== Folk Next Door VIII ===
"Ate"

1. River City Slim and the Zydeco Hogs La Valse de Kaplan
2. Margo Hennebach and Mark Saunders On Preacher Hill
3. Michael Hsu Your Boyfriend, Your Dad
4. Lucy Chapin Barefeet
5. Joe Flood Big Daddy Blues
6. Sonya Hunter Nonesuch
7. Einstein's Little Homunculus Celibacy
8. Freddie White When Jesus Gets to Town
9. Maggie Carchrie Peurt A Beuill
10. Mark Erelli Midnight
11. Cheryl Hoenemeyer Angela
12. Michael Veitch American Song
13. Amy Gallatin and Stillwaters California Blues
14. Joe Flood Always Will Always Mean You
15. Sonya Hunter Prohibition
16. Mark Erelli The River Road
17. Cheryl Hoenemeyer 2%
18. Amy Gallatin and Stillwaters Tennessee Fluxedo

=== Folk Next Door IX ===
"Nein"

1. Alastair Moock Lonely Heart
2. Rebekah Hayes One Candle Burns
3. Robin Greenstein Sacred Song
4. Eric Garrison Breathing
5. Adrienee Jones and Rani Arbo Uninvited Ghost
6. Lisa Moscatiello Second Avenue
7. Cece Borjeson (and Ruth George) A 'Soalin' (Trad.)
8. Groovelily Sitting on the Fence
9. Meg Hutchinson When It Rains
10. Meg Hutchinson Ockham's Razor
11. Gene and Mim Lose My Mind
12. Andrew McKnight Western Skies
13. Bernice Lewis Mercy
14. Eric Burkhart and Humpty Daddy No One Lives Here
15. Kevin Briody Walnuts and Rice
16. The Roadbirds West Texas Wind
17. Eric Burkhart and Humpty Daddy

=== At home for the holidays with the Folk Next Door ===
1. Dar Williams The Christians and the Pagans
2. Hugh and the New Coventry Carolers Kosher for Christmas
3. Madwoman in the Attic The Cherry Tree Carol
4. Ilene Weiss His Initials
5. The Nields Merry Christmas Mr. Jones
6. Mark Saunders Joy to the World
7. Margo Hennebach Winter Snows
8. Donna Martin Merry Christmas Baby
9. Ratsy If You're Not Dead
10. The New Coventry Carolers The New Coventry Carol
11. Patrick McGinley/ Mark Saunders Lefty Gets a Gift
12. Susan McKeown/ Lindsay Horner Through the Bitter Frost and Snow
13. Steven Nystrup Amazing Grace/ Christmas Morning
14. Hugh Blumenfeld This Mountain
15. Steven Nystrup Greensleeves
16. Peter Lehndorff Santa's Back
17. Amy Gallatin and Stillwaters Silent Night
