= Lorne Entress =

American musician

Lorne Entress is an American drummer, multi-instrumentalist and record producer, currently living in Glastonbury, Connecticut, United States.

Entress has worked with a wide range of artists in pop, folk, Americana, blues and jazz styles. He has produced albums for Lori McKenna, Catie Curtis, Ronnie Earl, Mighty Sam McClain, singer-songwriter Mark Erelli, Amy Black, Ronnie Earl, and many others. While known mainly as a producer and drummer/percussionist, Entress has been described as playing "every instrument under the sun, all with taste and restraint." On recordings his instruments have included guitars, keyboards, accordion, bass, autoharp, dulcimer, synths, and mandolin among others.

== Collaborations ==
Entress has performed and or recorded with the following acts:

- Johnny Adams
- Beth Amsel
- Big Al Anderson
- Austin and Elliot
- Amy Black
- Dennis Brennen
- Henry Butler
- Dave Carter and Tracy Grammer
- Susan Cattaneo
- Catie Curtis
- Kris Delmhorst
- Madi Diaz
- Ben Demerath
- Ronnie Earl
- Mark Erelli
- Jeffrey Foucault
- Peter Francis
- Four Piece Suit
- Vance Gilbert
- Tracy Grammer
- Jim Henry
- John Hogg
- The Horseflies
- Johnny Hoy
- Diana Jones
- Bruce Katz
- Jonathan Kingham
- Jess Klein
- Shane Koss
- Bobby Keyes
- Jenna Lindbo
- Lucky Stereo
- David Maxwell
- Bruce MacKay
- Larry MaCray
- Mighty Sam McClain
- Erin McKeown
- Lori McKenna
- Alastair Moock
- Charlie Musselwhite
- Nerrisa & Katryna Nields
- Ellis Paul
- The Radio Kings
- Hayley Reardon
- Kayla Ringelheim
- The Shabboo All Stars
- The Story
- Les Sampou
- Susan Tedeschi
- Toni Lynn Washington
- Brooks Williams
- Kim Wilson

== Books ==
- Time and Drumming (Mel Bay)
- Guitar Hymnal (Commissioned by the First Church of Christ, Scientist)
