= Dave Carter =

American singer-songwriter

Background information
- Born: David Robert Carter; August 13, 1952; Oxnard, California, U.S.
- Died: July 19, 2002 (aged 49) Hadley, Massachusetts, U.S.
- Genre: Folk
- Occupation: Singer-songwriter
- Instruments: Vocals; Guitar; Banjo; Piano
- Years active: 1995–2002
- Label: Signature Sounds

Dave Carter (August 13, 1952 – July 19, 2002) was an American folk music singer-songwriter who described his style as "post-modern mythic American folk music". He was one half of the duo Dave Carter and Tracy Grammer, who were heralded as the new "voice of modern folk music" in the months before Carter's unexpected death in July 2002. They were ranked as number one on the year-end list for "Top Artists" on the Folk Music Radio Airplay Chart for 2001 and 2002, and their popularity has endured in the years following Carter's death. Joan Baez, who went on tour with the duo in 2002, spoke of Carter's songs in the same terms that she once used to promote a young Bob Dylan:

"There is a special gift for writing songs that are available to other people, and Dave's songs are very available to me. It's a kind of genius, you know, and Dylan has the biggest case of it. But I hear it in Dave's songs, too.

Carter's songs were often noted for their poetic imagery, spirituality and storytelling while retaining connection to the country music of his southern American upbringing. Carter's memory has been kept alive by his many admirers, most notably his former partner. Tracy Grammer has continued to introduce previously unrecorded songs and recordings that the duo were working on prior to Carter's death.

== Early life and education ==
Dave Carter was born in Oxnard, California. His father was a mathematician and a petroleum engineer and his mother was a science teacher and a charismatic Christian. Carter was raised in Oklahoma and Texas and would draw on his rural upbringing in many of his songs. He studied classical piano from age 4 to about age 12, when he took up guitar. At 17, he left home to hitchhike around the country, especially the Midwestern United States (Great Plains area). After graduating with degrees in music (cello) and fine arts from the University of Oklahoma, Carter moved to Portland, Oregon, where he continued his education at Portland State University, earning a degree in mathematics. He began an advanced degree in mathematics, but a personal epiphany led him to realize that this was not to be his field. He went on to study what he called "the psychology of mystical experience" at the Institute of Transpersonal Psychology in Palo Alto and the California Institute of Integral Studies in San Francisco, and worked as an embedded systems programmer for several years before taking up music full-time in the mid-1990s. Carter was greatly influenced by mythologist Joseph Campbell, who visited his college, and American mystic Carlos Castaneda. He was also influenced by the American landscape, Arthurian mythology, the environment, and transcendental psychology.

== Partnership with Tracy Grammer ==
Dave Carter and Tracy Grammer

Prior to his death, Carter released three albums with Grammer: When I Go (1998); Tanglewood Tree (2000); and Drum Hat Buddha (2001). The duo re-recorded many of the songs from Snake Handlin' Man, plus two previously unrecorded songs, in early 2002. The CD, called Seven Is the Number, was released by Tracy Grammer in 2006. A collection of the duo's holiday recordings called American Noel was compiled by Tracy Grammer and released in 2008 by Signature Sounds. In 2012, Grammer partnered with Red House Records to release "Little Blue Egg" and a limited-edition companion EP, "Joy My Love", which included previously-unpublished recordings and rare demos from the duo's home studio.

== Transgender identity ==
In 2000 Carter revealed to Grammer that he had struggled with gender dysphoria since his early teen years. Grammer later said, "... he was exploring a gender change and that altered the dynamics of our off-stage relationship. It actually made things quite difficult for us personally, but anyone on the outside would not have known that. It was just a process that we were going through and that, thankfully, we reconciled with by the time he died."

Of this timeframe, Grammer said: "... We even had a whole plan for the unveiling. He was going to release one more manly ‘Cowboy Dave’ album, and I would introduce myself as a solo artist. Then he would go change and we would come back as an all-girl band, calling ourselves The Butterfly Conservatory. He would be she and that would be that."

== Death and tributes ==
Carter died of a massive heart attack on July 19, 2002, in a hotel room in Hadley, Massachusetts after returning from an early morning run. He and Grammer were slated to play that weekend at the Green River Festival in Greenfield and were booked that summer to play many of the nation's top folk festivals and folk clubs. He was 49. Carter's death came as a great shock to the folk music community. Tracy Grammer gave her account of Carter's final moments in a letter to fans:

"Yesterday, shortly after he went unconscious, he came back for a lucid minute or two to tell me, 'I just died... Baby, I just died...' There was a look of wonder in his eyes, and though I cried and tried to deny it to him, I knew he was right and he was on his way. He stayed with me a minute more but despite my attempts to keep him with me, I could see he was already riding that thin chiffon wave between here and gone. He loved beauty, he was hopelessly drawn to the magic and the light in all things. I figure he saw something he could not resist out of the corner of his eye and flew into it. Despite the fact that every rescue attempt was made by paramedics and hospital staff and the death pronouncement officially came at 12:08 pm Eastern Time, I believe he died in my arms in our favorite hotel, leaving me with those final words. That's the true story I am going to tell."

Many had predicted that the duo was destined for success beyond the typical folk music circles. Jim Olsen, president of Carter's record label, Signature Sounds, said, "I always believed it would only take one cover by a major star to unveil his work to the rest of the world; and I was convinced that was going to happen. Somebody was going to open the door for them; and the thing about Dave's music is that once people heard it, they became lifelong fans." Fellow folksinger and journalist Matt Watroba wrote, "It would make sense at this point to say that Dave Carter was on the verge of something big. The truth, however, is that Dave was something big already. He moved the people lucky enough to know him or his music in a way that has launched an outpouring of tributes, memories and love."

Grammer decided to keep the duo's appointment to play the 2002 Falcon Ridge Folk Festival the following week and a tribute concert was arranged. The tribute included performances by a number of Carter's admirers singing his songs. Highlights included Chris Smither's cover of "Crocodile Man", Mark Erelli singing "Cowboy Singer", a rendition of "Happytown" by The Kennedys, and "Farewell to Saint Dolores" by Eddie From Ohio. Grammer herself opened the show with "The Mountain" and closed with "Gentle Soldier of My Soul". Several artists have since written tributes in Carter's honor and in 2005 Grammer released Flower of Avalon, including nine previously unrecorded songs by Carter.

== Songwriting ==
Dave Carter's songs have been covered by many others, most notably by Judy Collins and Willie Nelson ("When I Go"), Joan Baez ("The Mountain"), Lucy Kaplansky ("Cowboy Singer") and Chris Smither ("Crocodile Man"). Tributes to Dave following his death were written by Tracy Grammer ("The Verdant Mile") and Richard Shindell ("So Says the Whippoorwill"), among others.

One song, "Gentle Arms of Eden", was added to the hymnal in at least one Unitarian Universalist congregation. More of Carter's songs were recorded by Tracy Grammer on her 2005 album Flower of Avalon.

Dave Carter was the first winner of the songwriting contest held at Sisters Folk Festival in 1995. In 2005 the contest took his name, becoming the Dave Carter Memorial Songwriting Contest, to honor both his initial victory and his advocacy of the festival in the subsequent years. Carter is listed among the winners of the 1998 edition of the Kerrville New Folk Songwriting Competition. He also won the 1998 edition of the Wildflower Performing Songwriter Award and the Napa Valley Folk Festival Emerging Songwriter Award.

== Discography ==
- Snake Handlin' Man, Dave Carter (self-release, 1995, out of print)
- When I Go, Dave Carter with Tracy Grammer (self-release 1998, Signature Sounds 2002)
- Tanglewood Tree, Dave Carter and Tracy Grammer (Signature Sounds, 2000)
- Drum Hat Buddha, Dave Carter and Tracy Grammer (Signature Sounds, 2001)
- Seven Is the Number Dave Carter and Tracy Grammer (Tracy Grammer Music, 2006)
- American Noel Dave Carter and Tracy Grammer (Signature Sounds, 2008)
- Little Blue Egg Dave Carter and Tracy Grammer (Red House Records, 2012–2017)
- Joy My Love Dave Carter and Tracy Grammer (Red House Records, 2012–2017) limited edition EP

=== Partial list of covers ===
Songs written by Dave Carter performed by other artists:

- Flower of Avalon (Signature Sounds, 2005–2019 / Tracy Grammer Music), Tracy Grammer, includes nine previously unrecorded Dave Carter songs.
- "The Mountain", in 2001 concerts, Joan Baez
- "The River Where She Sleeps", from A Crooked Line (2001), Darryl Purpose
- "Tanglewood Tree", from Clearwater (2002), Chris and Meredith Thompson
- "Crocodile Man", from Train Home (Hightone Records, 2003), Chris Smither
- "Farewell to St. Dolores", Gambling Eden (2003), Rani Arbo
- "Gentle Arms of Eden", from Temporary Stay (2003), Pat Wictor
- "Gentle Arms of Eden", from Side of the Road (2003), Ellis Paul and Vance Gilbert
- "Walkin' Away from Caroline", from God's Poet Now, (2003, EP to benefit the Dave Carter Memorial Fund), Erik Balkey
- "Cat Eye Willie Claims His Lover", from Sweet Mystery of Life (2004), Full Frontal Folk
- "Cowboy Singer", from The Red Thread (Red House Records, 2004), Lucy Kaplansky
- "Gentle Soldier of My Soul", from Paintbrush (2004), Diane Zeigler
- "The Mountain", LIVE (2004), Chris and Meredith Thompson
- "Quickdraw Southpaw's Last Hurrah", from One Horse Town (2005), Jim Henry
- "When I Go", from Bristlecone Pine (2006), Bryan Bowers
- "Happytown (It's Alright with Me)" and "Gypsy Rose", from Songs of the Open Road (Appleseed Recordings, 2006), The Kennedys
- "When I Go", from Stand (2003), The Kennedys
- "When I Go", from Heaven is So High and I'm So Far Down (RiskyDisk, 2006), Pat Wictor
- "Gun Metal Eyes", from Liberty Tree (Songs from the Kitchen Table) (2007), Mission Street Project
- "Kate and the Ghost of Lost Love", from Open The Gate (2007) Sense of Wonder
- "When I Go" from Live (2003), Ronny Cox
- "The Mountain" from Not Far Now (2009) by Richard Shindell
- "Tanglewood Tree" from Wicked Girls (2010) by Seanan McGuire
- "Girl from Golden" from Next Time Around (2012) by Darryl Purpose
- "Gentle Arms of Eden" from Horsetamer (2013) by Julia Ecklar
- "Farewell to Saint Dolores" from The Pine Hill Project (2015) by Richard Shindell & Lucy Kaplansky
- "When I Go" from Strangers Again (2015) by Judy Collins feat. Willie Nelson

=== Tributes ===
Songs written by other artists as tributes to Dave Carter:

- "The Verdant Mile", from The Verdant Mile (Tracy Grammer Music, 2004), Tracy Grammer
- "Between Here and Gone," from Between Here and Gone (2004) Mary Chapin Carpenter
- "Friend of the Coyote", from Kickin' This Stone (2004), Johnsmith
- "So Says the Whippoorwill", from Vuelta (Signature Sounds, 2004), Richard Shindell
- "God's Poet Now", from God's Poet Now (2003), Erik Balkey
- "Wheel Inside the Wheel", from Mercy Now (2004), Mary Gauthier
- "Tribute", from From the Hazel Tree (written 2002, recorded 2004), written by Catherine Faber, recorded by Echo's Children
- "I Shall Not Look Away", from Tiger Tattoo (Waterbug Records, 2002), Andrew Calhoun
- "Willow", from Open The Gate (2007), Sense of Wonder
- "Dave's Song", from White Bird (2003), Emily Kurn
- "Oklahoma Spirit Guide", from Spirit Guide (2006, Redbud Hill), Randy Auxier
- "Where Did You Go?" from Sunset Waltz (2008), Pat Wictor
