= Dave Carter and Tracy Grammer =

American folk music duo

- Dave Carter and Tracy Grammer

Background information
- Origin: Portland, Oregon, US
- Genre: Folk
- Years active: 1998–2002
- Label: Signature Sounds
- Past members: Dave Carter; Tracy Grammer
- Website: www.daveandtracy.com

Dave Carter and Tracy Grammer were an American folk duo who released three albums from 1998 to 2001, as well as additional material released after Dave Carter's death. The duo consisted of Dave Carter (songwriter, vocals, banjo, guitar, organ) and Tracy Grammer (producer, vocals, violin, mandolin, guitar).

Their work dealt with a number of themes, particularly Buddhist theology, Arthurian legend (and mythic themes in general), and the American west, often juxtaposed together in one song. In 2002, shortly before his death, Dave spoke of the duo's "ever-burgeoning goddess repertoire" as another lyric theme. One example of mixture of themes may be found in the closing lines of "Happytown", the first track from the album, Tanglewood Tree:

"parceval and valentino, ridin' winged palominos
willie in his el camino, on the run

here in the shining city, here in the endless summer
here in the cave of wonder, number ninety-two
the gods will lounge around until the show is through
but it's all right, it's all right with me, if it's all right with you"

Their first album, When I Go (1998), was actually released as a Dave Carter album "with Tracy Grammer" and Carter sang the lead vocals on all but one of the tracks, "Kate and the Ghost of Lost Love", which was a duet. Produced by the duo, the album was recorded in Grammer's kitchen. Their second album, Tanglewood Tree (2000), featured a more even split of singing duties, and was the first to actually be labeled as a Dave Carter and Tracy Grammer album. The album was described by Carter in an interview as "the world's first Buddhist country album". Their third album (the last released before Carter's death), Drum Hat Buddha (2001), maintained an even split between the two on lead vocals. This album met with critical success, and the pair was considered by prominent reviewers to be one of the most promising new folk acts then active. In 2002, they toured the United States with folk legend Joan Baez, who described Carter's lyric writing as "a kind of genius".

On July 19, 2002, Carter died of a massive heart attack while on tour in western Massachusetts. The impact on the folk music community was considerable; a substantial shrine was spontaneously created by fans and colleagues at the Falcon Ridge Folk Festival the following week. Grammer chose to attend the festival and perform without Carter. The festival organizers transformed the originally scheduled Dave and Tracy set into a tribute concert at which many of the performers at the festival sang Carter's songs, led by Grammer.

Following Carter's death, Grammer went on to release a solo album, The Verdant Mile (2004), the title track of which was her own tribute to Carter's memory and music. She followed this with Flower of Avalon (2005), an album featuring nine previously unreleased songs by Carter. The album was produced by Grammer with John Jennings and featured harmonies by Mary Chapin Carpenter on many of the tracks.

In 2006, Grammer released another full-length Dave Carter and Tracy Grammer album, Seven Is the Number. The album consisted of a 2001–2002 re-recording by the duo of Carter's out-of-print solo project Snake Handlin' Man, with the addition of two previously unreleased songs, "Seven Is the Number" and "Gas Station Girl".

2007 saw the release of Grammer's latest album, Book of Sparrows, which contained two Dave Carter songs, as well as American Noel, a collection of holiday songs recorded by Dave Carter and Tracy Grammer, four of which were Carter originals.

In February 2012, a new Carter and Grammer album, Little Blue Egg, was released by Red House Records. The material consists of eleven songs (ten of them Carter compositions) for which Carter had recorded vocals a decade or more earlier. Grammer found the tapes in their home and finished the songs herself.
