= Snake Handlin' Man =

Studio album by Dave Carter
- Released: 1995
- Genres: Folk; Singer-songwriter
- Length: mm:ss
- Label: Red River Records (self-release)

Dave Carter chronology
| Snake Handlin' Man (1995) | When I Go (1998) |

Professional ratings
Review scores
| Source | Rating |
|---|---|
| Dirty Linen | favorable-mixed |
| FAME | favorable |

Snake Handlin' Man is a 1995 album by American folk singer Dave Carter. This was his solo debut prior to his very successful partnership with fiddler, Tracy Grammer (see Dave Carter and Tracy Grammer). The duo re-recorded "The River Where She Sleeps" for their 1998 album When I Go, and "Cowboy Singer" for their 2000 release, Tanglewood Tree. Prior to Carter's death in 2002 the duo re-recorded the remaining nine songs and two new songs. The resulting final album, Seven is the Number was released in 2006.

== Track listing ==
All songs written by Dave Carter

1. "Cowboy Singer"
2. "Snake-Handlin' Man"
3. "Red (Elegy)"
4. "The Promised Land"
5. "Hey Tonya"
6. "The River Where She Sleeps"
7. "Long Black Road Into Tulsa Town"
8. "Texas Underground"
9. "Workin' For Jesus"
10. "Gun-Metal Eyes"
11. "Sarah Turn 'Round"

== Personnel ==
- Dave Carter – vocals, guitar and banjo
- Dana Denton – vocals and percussion
- Arlene Hale – bass and vocals
- Carolyn Laster – accordion and vocals
- Susan Martin; vocals
- Eric Park – harmonica
- Nancy Young-Mathisen – vocals and keys
- Troy Mathisen – Engineer
