= Book of Sparrows =

EP by Tracy Grammer
- Released: December 23, 2007
- Genre: Folk
- Label: Tracy Grammer Music
- Producer: Tracy Grammer and Jim Henry

Tracy Grammer chronology
Flower of Avalon (2005)	Book of Sparrows (2007)

Book of Sparrows is a seven-song EP by American folk singer Tracy Grammer released in December, 2007. Grammer accompanies herself on a number of different instruments and also receives support on vocals and various guitars from Jim Henry. She and Henry have been touring together since September 2003.

== The songs ==
The seven compositions are all covers from highly acclaimed writer/performers and many of the songs have themes of love and loss. These include titles by established artists such as Paul Simon's "April, Come She Will", and Tom Russell's "Blue Wing". There are also songs by artists who are relative newcomers to the folk scene, like David Francey's "The Waking Hour". Kate Power's "Travis John" tells the story of Corporal Travis John Bradach-Nall, one of the first soldiers from Power's home state of Oregon to die in the Iraq War.

Also, notable are the two songs by her former partner, the late Dave Carter. "Lord of the Buffalo" is a previously unreleased song, and this version of "Gypsy Rose" has been described as a "slower more reflective" take than the one that appeared on her previous album.

== Critical response ==
Professional ratings
Review scores
Source	Rating
Folk Alley	link
FolkWax	(8/10)
Kevin McCarthy	(favorable) link
MusicMatters	(favorable) link

Reviewers have noted that Grammer does make each of these songs her own. Writing for MusicMatters Review Michael Devlin sums the album up stating, "Each song has a lingering beauty that makes this a book of unique creations that all fly in a similar direction. Well-done in every way!" Kevin McCarthy outlines the album's themes as follows: "Longing for difference yet also connectedness, for independence but not separateness, wishing at times to be someone or somewhere else, with harmony just maybe over the next rise." A couple of writers while giving favorable reviews of this EP seem to express an even greater anticipation for a full release from Grammer to follow up on 2005's Flower of Avalon.

== Track listing ==
No.	Title	Length
1.	"Blue Wing" (Tom Russell)	4:55
2.	"Travis John" (Kate Power)	4:02
3.	"The Waking Hour" (David Francey)	3:58
4.	"Lord of the Buffalo" (Dave Carter)	4:39
5.	"Gypsy Rose (aka Gypsy Down)" (Dave Carter)	5:15
6.	"April, Come She Will" (Paul Simon)	2:06
7.	"In the Shape of a Heart" (Jackson Browne)	6:00

== Personnel ==
=== Musicians ===
- Tracy Grammer - vocals, guitar, banjo, mandola, violin, percussion
- Jim Henry - vocals, acoustic guitar, electric guitar, dobro

=== Production ===
- Produced by Tracy Grammer and Jim Henry
- Mastered by Dave Chalfant

== Charts ==
Date	chart	peak
December 2007	Folk Radio Airplay	3
