= Dave McCann (singer-songwriter) =

- Born: 1972 (age 53–54); Etobicoke, Ontario, Canada
- Occupations: Singer, songwriter
- Website: www.davemccann.com

Dave McCann (born May 25, 1972) is a Canadian-based songwriter and performer from Peterborough, Ontario.

== Early life ==
David Brian McCann was born in Etobicoke, Ontario, Canada to Jeanette McCann (Nova Scotia) and Brian McCann (Ontario). He was raised in the Kawartha Lakes region of Ontario, between Keene and Peterborough, Ontario. He relocated to Calgary Alberta in 1995.

== Career ==
A member of the Alberta roots scene, McCann formed his band Dave McCann and The Ten Toed Frogs in the early 1990s. He released his first recording Woodland Tea in 2000, and Country Medicine in 2004. His live recording Shoot The Horse (2008) was one of the last performances recorded in Edmonton at the Sidetrack Cafe, one of Canada's historic live music venues. Shoot the Horse was recorded on November 11, 2006.

McCann's fourth release, Dixiebluebird, was released in 2010, bringing with it a name change to Dave McCann and the Firehearts. Dixiebluebird was recorded by Lij Shaw in East Nashville at the Toybox Studio and produced by guitarist and producer Will Kimbrough.

McCann's fourth release, Circle of Light, was released in 2014. Its eleven compositions range from folk to roots-based rock and roll.

In 2019, McCann released Westbound til Light. The project was recorded in sessions over a year in Nanton, Alberta. It features the new and longtime members of McCann's band the Firehearts, and Peterborough, Ontario’s Mayhemingways. The Westbound til Light tour started at the Empress Theatre in Fort Macleod. Frank McTighe from the Fort Macleod Gazette said "McCann is possibly one of the best untold singer-songwriters working in contemporary roots music".

Dave's newest project Soothsayer's Blues was recorded in Coldwater Mississippi at the Zebra Ranch the historic home studio of late Muscle Shoals Session player and Producer Jim Dickinson known for his work with Bob Dylan, Aretha Franklin, The Rolling Stones and Ry Cooder. The Project was built with producer Jimbo Mathus who has worked with Buddy Guy, Elvis Costello, Ironingboard Sam, Bette Smith and Andrew Bird.

McCann has shared the bill and stage with Washboard Hank, Willie P. Bennett, Blackie and the Rodeo Kings, Naomi Shelton, Melanie Safka, Dave Carter and Tracy Grammer, Joe Pug, Kieran Kane, The Skydiggers, Geoff Muldaur and more. He tours as part of the Highway Three Roots Revue, a songwriters' tour with Juno-nominated roots artist John Wort Hannam and alt-rock songsmith Leeroy Stagger.

== Personal life ==
He resides with his wife and two children about an hour north of Montana's Glacier National Park in Lethbridge, Alberta, Canada.

== Discography ==
- Woodland Tea (2000)
- Country Medicine (2004)
- Shoot the Horse (2007)
- Dixiebluebird (2010)
- Circle of Light (2014)
- Westbound til Light (2019)
