= Alastair Moock =

American singer-songwriter

- Born: New York City, United States
- Origin: Boston, Massachusetts, United States
- Genres: Folk, Children's, independent
- Occupation: Singer-songwriter
- Instruments: Singing, acoustic guitar, banjo
- Years active: 1995–present
- Label: Moockshake Music (ASCAP)
- Website: www.moockmusic.com

Alastair Moock (born 1973, New York City, United States) is an American folk music performer from Boston, Massachusetts. He is known for his gruff voice, playful lyrics, and fingerpicking guitar style.

== History ==
Moock's interest in traditional music started at a young age when his father took him to see Pete Seeger and Arlo Guthrie in concert. What he heard and saw that evening affected him strongly. While invigorated by the music, he noticed how the audience became part of the event by joining in the singing. A few years later he discovered Woody Guthrie's Library of Congress recordings. After graduating from Williams College in 1995, Moock moved to Boston and launched his performing career at open mikes and local coffeehouses. In 1997 he released his debut album, Walking Sounds, and followed it with the eight-song mini-album Bad Moock Rising in 1999.

By 2002, Moock had traveled extensively throughout the East and Midwest, performing at some of the top listening rooms and outdoor events in the country, including the Newport Folk Festival, the Falcon Ridge Folk Festival, the Boston Folk Festival, the Old Town School of Folk Music in Chicago, The Birchmere in Washington D.C., and the Bluebird Cafe in Nashville. In 2003 he made his first trip to Europe, where he performed at the Bergen Music Fest in Norway. Many more European tours would follow, with performances in Norway, France, Germany, Belgium, Poland, the Netherlands, and the UK. Back in the U.S., Moock won some prestigious songwriting competitions, including those at the Falcon Ridge Folk Festival, Sisters Folk Festival, and the Great Waters Music Festival.

Alastair says that he's always been moved by music "that connects me to progressive issues and social involvement. It's always been a big part of what I've wanted to do as a musician." That social involvement has resulted in Moock often organizing benefits to help those in need.

In May 2007, his album Fortune Street, produced by David "Goody" Goodrich, was released in the United States and Europe by Corazong Records. In his review of the album for Sing Out!, Scott Sheldon wrote "There are no simple songs on Fortune Street; each grapples with hard times, deep feelings, or dramatic moments in history." The album includes two historical ballads: "Woody's Lament" exploring Woody Guthrie's internal conflict between his family and the pull of the road, and "Cloudsplitter," a modal mountain dirge based on Russell Banks' novel about the life of abolitionist John Brown.

In 2010, Moock began to turn his attention to performing for kids and families. He has since put out five albums for families which, between them, have earned a GRAMMY nomination, three Parents’ Choice Awards Gold Medals, the ASCAP Joe Raposo Children's Music Award, and first place in the International Songwriting Contest. The New York Times has called him "a Tom Waits for kids" and The Boston Globe has written that, "in the footsteps of Pete Seeger and Woody Guthrie, Alastair Moock makes real kids music that parents can actually enjoy."

Moock says his album, "Singing Our Way Through: Songs for the World's Bravest Kids," is the one "nearest and dearest to his heart." In July 2012, one of Alastair's twin children was diagnosed with Acute Lymphoblastic Leukemia. The Singing Our Way Through project began when Alastair started co-writing songs with her in the hospital. Over the next several months, Moock continued to write and collect songs that reflected his family's experiences.

Moock decided he wanted to record an album for other families traveling similar paths. With the help of a crowd funding campaign which raised nearly $28,000, he was able to raise the money he needed to make the album he wanted to record. In January 2013, Moock went into the studio with friends and collaborators from the world of Americana music, including Chris Smither, Mark Erelli, Aoife O'Donovan (vocalist for the 2013 Grammy-winning "Goat Rodeo Sessions," Best Folk Album), and family music artists Rani Arbo, The Okee Dokee Brothers (2013 Grammy-winners, Best Children's Album), Elizabeth Mitchell (2013 Grammy-nominee, Best Children's Album), and co-producer Anand Nayak.

Upon its release in July 2013, "Singing Our Way Through" was called "a masterpiece" by Salon.com and was chosen as a "Best Kids Music" pick by People Magazine. Moock was also interviewed by Katie Couric and on GMA Live (the "Good Morning America" webcast). Eventually, "Singing Our Way Through" went on to garner a 2014 Grammy Award nomination. and gold medals from the Parents' Choice Foundation and the National Parenting Publications Awards. With the help of album sales and his crowd funding campaign, Moock has so far been able to send out nearly 3,000 free physical and digital copies to patient families and hospitals around the country.

Moock returned to “adult” recording with his 2017 eponymous release produced by Mark Erelli. The album reached the top ten of the national Folk DJ chart in June of that year, and Rich Warren, of the nationally syndicated The Midnight Special radio program, hailed Moock as “the best new, old singer-songwriter on the scene.”

Moock's 2020 album for families, "Be a Pain: An Album for Young (and Old) Leaders," is described by Moock's publicity team as:

a joyful, musical rallying cry for young (and old) leaders in these turbulent times. It looks to the heroes of our past (Dr. Martin Luther King Jr., Harvey Milk, Billie Jean King, Pete Seeger, Cesar Chavez, Rosa Parks, Malcolm X) and our present (Malala Yousafzai, the Parkland student protestors, climate change marchers) to inspire our kids to move the ball forward.

— SugarMountain PR

The album features guest performances from a diverse group of musicians including Sol y Canto, Alisa Amador, Reggie Harris, Mark Erelli, Melanie DeMore, Kris Delmhorst, Rani Arbo, Crys Matthews, Sean Staples, Heather Mae, Boston City Singers, and GRAMMY-nominated producer Anand Nayak. On the album's release in March 2020 Nora Guthrie, daughter of folksinger Woody Guthrie and director of Woody Guthrie Publications wrote, "How lucky we are to have Alastair Moock around these days! When too many adults are role modeling the pursuit of fame, fortune, or personal gain, Alastair's songs encourage our kids to pursue goodness, kindness, awareness and courage. Adults might listen up!"

Moock once again ran a crowd-funding campaign for this album, raising over $13,000 to allow him to give away free copies of the album, along with free programming on social justice history, to underserved schools in the Boston region and beyond.

2020 was a major turning point in Alastair's career. In the winter of that pandemic year, he co-founded Family Music Forward, a national racial justice organization working to amplify Black voices in the children's music space. When, a few months later, he received a second Grammy nod for Best Children's Album – alongside four other white artists – he chose to respectfully decline the nomination, citing historical under-representation in the category.

Moock went on to co-found The Opening Doors Project, an organization dedicated to amplifying voices of color and advancing interracial conversations about race through the arts. Opening Doors has two main branches of programming: The first is a series of community concerts and conversations, which has featured such national artists as Dom Flemons (Carolina Chocolate Drops), Rissi Palmer, Dan Zanes and Claudia Zanes, and Vance Gilbert; the second is a group of educational programs which Moock and his colleagues bring to schools throughout the Northeast and beyond. Opening Doors’ flagship program, “Race and Song: A Musical Conversation” was co-created by Alastair and his friend of nearly 30 years, Reggie Harris. Together, they explore complex issues of race, class, gender, and history, framing their lived experiences through music.

Moock is a charter member of The Folk Collective equity group at historic Club Passim in Harvard Square, a Juried Artist with Music to Life, a co-founder of The Melrose Racial Justice Community Coalition in his hometown outside of Boston, and a recipient of the 2024 Phil Ochs Award. He is also a regular contributor to Boston NPR's online magazine Cognoscenti, where he writes about music, social justice, and his deepest love of all: basketball.

== Discography ==
- Walking Sounds (1997)
- Bad Moock Rising (1999)
- A Life I Never Had (2001)
- Let it Go (2005)
- Fortune Street (2007)
- A Cow Says Moock (2010)
- These Are My Friends (2011)
- Singing Our Way Through: Songs for the World's Bravest Kids (2013)
- All Kind of You and Me (2015)
- Alastair Moock (2017)
- Be a Pain: An Album for Young (and Old) Leaders (2020)
