= DW (Dave) Drouillard =

American singer-songwriter

DW Drouillard
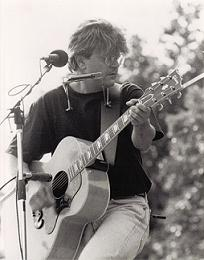
- At the Apple Valley Family Folk Festival, 1992.

Background information
- Born: David Wilson Drullard; March 23, 1950 (age 76); Buffalo, New York, United States
- Genres: Folk, British folk rock
- Occupations: Vocalist, songwriter, musician
- Instruments: Guitar, piano, Mandolin, Harmonica
- Years active: 1972–present
- Label: Red Jacket Music
- Website: signtalkermusic.com

DW Drouillard (born March 23, 1950, in Buffalo, New York) is an American vocalist, songwriter and musician.

== Background ==
DW Drouillard (birth name, David Wilson Drullard) was introduced at an early age to the songs of Woody Guthrie, Huddie Ledbetter, The Weavers, and the work of John Jacob Niles by his mother, Elizabeth Harriet Wilson, a music educator and 1943 graduate of Case Western Reserve University. He entered Trinity Church Choir in 1959, transitioning to St. Paul's Cathedral (Buffalo) Choir in 1962 where he trained as a countertenor in the tradition of Alfred Deller.

Drouillard attended University of Mount Union in Alliance, Ohio and graduated with a degree in English Literature. As a student he was active in the school's madrigal group, the college choir, and was a founding member of the folk group Main Street, Mom, and Apple Pie.

== Career ==
Upon graduation, Drouillard began his music career knocking about the coffeehouses of Spicertown, Akron, Ohio; Allentown, Buffalo, New York; and Yorkville, Toronto, Ontario. He made his first appearance on the venerable WMMS Coffeebreak Concert Series in Cleveland, Ohio, December 6, 1972. Drouillard relocated to New Haven, CT in the fall of 1974 as a featured artist for the historic New York Longchamps Restaurant Group. In addition to his regular schedule, he played opening sets for Toots and the Maytals and Pure Prairie League. In 1977, Drouillard joined the country-rock band, Yankee, and wrote "Green Eyes Crying in the Rain", which was included on the WHCN Homegrown compilation album.

Beginning in 1981, Drouillard stayed closer to home where he performed at local venues and opened for touring artists including Peter Ostroushko, Connie Kaldor, and Jorma Kaukonen. In 1992 he appeared on the WWUH Folk Next Door I live concert album and that summer directed the first of three Apple Valley Family Folk Festivals (1992, 1993, 1994). In 1995, Drouillard performed on the WWUH Folk Next Door IV album and released a retrospective recording of original material, Plainsongs, introducing DWDrouilllard and The Great Buffalo Band. Artists appearing on the album include Darren Wallace formerly of the band Filé, Ken Karpowicz of the Zydeco Zombies, Mark Mercier of the band Max Creek, Phil Rosenthal formerly of the Seldom Scene, Todd Cook, and Matthew Chirsky. Also in 1995, Drouillard appeared on the Euphonious Mode, Acoustic and beyond..., Volume 2 CD-ROM produced by Harvee Riggs. Dave's 1996 performance schedule included a return to Caffe Lena in Saratoga Springs, NY for the 7th Annual Folk-A-Thon and an appearance at Club Passim in Cambridge, MA.

Drouillard continues to write and perform, dividing his time between Southern New England and the Niagara Region of Ontario. Dave has performed at the regional 2010 East Rock West Rock Music Festival in New Haven (The Space venue), and the 92nd Annual Durham Fair.

== Awards and recognition ==
- American Hymn – Finalist, The American Song Festival 1975, Hollywood, CA
- Green Eyes Crying in the Rain – People's Choice Award, New Haven Advocate Poll 1977
- Bury My Heart at Wounded Knee – Semi-finalist, New Folk, Kerrville Folk Festival 1993
- Dominion Blue – Semi-finalist (Folk category), Mid-Atlantic Song Contest 1993, The Songwriters' Association of Washington
- Bury My Heart at Wounded Knee – Festival Performance, Hear in Rhode Island 1996, The Rhode Island Songwriters' Association

== Critical citations ==
- "After a solid year of hard work in the studio. . .Dave Drouillard has delivered a gratifying and infectious collection of songs that plumb the mysteries of life, love, nature and the everlasting pursuit of solace amidst chaos and despair. In fact, many of Drouillard's best compositions deal with journeys through stormy seas and troubled relationships, and across unforgiving landscapes, always in pursuit of an answer that seems to lie hidden just across the next ridge, or beyond a maddeningly distant border. . .Drouillard sings in a tenor laden with the weariness, anticipation and emotion of the search." – Ed McKeon
- "Dave does it all. Plan to spend the time and listen to him. One of the finest acoustic musicians we've heard in a long time." – The Clinton Bluefish Festival 1995
- ". . .But David Drouillard's valuables are different. His shoe box is filled with a treasure far more personal – his words. . . The album highlights the sweet tenor of this former boy soprano as well as his poetic narrative flair, which often evokes the mythical tone of fairy tales." – Orla Swift
- ". . .I really wanted to detest this Drouillard record before it went into the sonic transducer. . .But Dave's voice is as pretty a voice as you'll hear in the area these days. OK, "pretty" is a silly adjective to use in most cases, but Drouillard's tenor is all that and more. He brings Celtic influences, a wee bit o' Cajun voilin, and Phil Rosenthal (formerly of Seldom Scene on banjo and mandolin) who adds some natty flavor as well." – Michael Caito
