= Susan McKeown discography =

- Studio albums: 17
- EPs: 3
- Compilation albums: 23

The discography of Susan McKeown contains seventeen studio albums, three EPs, and twenty-three appearances on compilation albums. Since 1989, McKeown has served as the front woman of Susan McKeown & The Chanting House. Their 1996 album Bones garnered international recognition, with Time Magazine remarking “this is the kind of music that will link Ireland’s musical past with its future.”

Her 2004 album Sweet Liberty—a blend of Celtic folk with elements of Mexican Mariachi and Malian Tuareg music—was nominated at the BBC Radio 2 Folk Awards. McKeown's 2006 album Wonder Wheel with The Klezmatics won the Grammy Award for Best Contemporary World Music Album. Her 2012 album Belong was a critical and commercial success, and its lead single, “Everything We Had Was Good,” reached No. 1 on the U.S. Folk Singles Chart.

Her guest appearances include multiple collaborations will fellow singer-songwriters Natalie Merchant and Linda Thompson.

== Albums ==
=== With The Chanting House ===
Title	Album details
Bones	Released: September 17, 1996; Label: 1-800-Prime-CD; Format: Compact disc
Prophecy	Released: March 4, 2002; Label: Sheila-na-Gig Music; Format: Compact disc

=== Solo albums ===
Title	Album details	US Folk
Bushes and Briars	Released: February 3, 1998; Label: Alula Records; Format: Compact disc	-
Lowlands	Released: September 26, 2000; Label: Green Linnet Records; Format: Compact disc	-
Sweet Liberty	Released: April 13, 2004; Label: World Village; Format: Compact disc	-
Blackthorn: Irish Love Songs	Released: March 14, 2006; Label: World Village; Format: Compact disc	-
Singing in the Dark	Released: October 30, 2010; Label: Hibernian Music; Format: Compact disc	-
Belong	Released: November 13, 2012; Label: Fish Records; Format: Compact disc	11

=== With The Klezmatics ===
Title	Album details	US World
Woody Guthrie's Happy Joyous Hanukkah	Released: September 5, 2006; Label: Shout! Studios; Format: Compact disc	1
Wonder Wheel	Released: January 29, 2007; Label: Shout! Studios; Format: Compact disc	1
Saints & Tzadiks	Released: July 8, 2009; Label: World Village; Format: Compact disc	-
Live at Town Hall	Released: October 11, 2011; Label: Proper Music Distribution; Format: Compact disc	-

=== With Lindsey Horner ===
Title	Album details
Through the Bitter Frost and Snow	Released: October 14, 1997; Label: 1-800-Prime-CD; Format: Compact disc
Mighty Rain	Released: October 20, 1998; Label: Depth of Field; Format: Compact disc

=== With Johnny Cunningham ===
Title	Album details
Peter and Wendy	Released: October 21, 1997; Label: Alula Records; Format: Compact disc
A Winter Talisman	Released: December 19, 2001; Label: Sheila-na-Gig Music; Format: Compact disc

=== With Cathie Ryan & Robin Spielberg ===
Title	Album details
Mother	Released: March 23, 1999; Label: North Star Music; Format: Compact disc

== EPs ==
Title	Album details
The Chanting House	Released: 1990; Label: Self-released; Format: Cassette tape
The Chanting House: LIVE	Released: 1992; Label: Self-released; Format: Cassette tape
Snakes	Released: November 1, 1997; Label: 1-800-Prime-CD; Format: Compact disc

== Compilation album appearances ==
Title	Album details
Straight Outta Ireland	Released: March 9, 1993; Label: BMG Rights Management; Format: Compact disc
Upsalapalooza	Released: May 5, 1995; Label: WFMU; Format: Compact disc
Rebirth	Released: October 1, 1996; Label: Fast Folk; Format: Compact disc
Women Of The World: Celtic II	Released: September 7, 1997; Label: Putumayo World Music; Format: Compact disc
The Soul of Christmas: A Celtic Music Celebration	Released: October 14, 1997; Label: Tommy Boy Records; Format: Compact disc
Celtic Heartbeat: A Winter's Tale	Released: February 24, 1998; Label: Celtic Music; Format: Compact disc
Colors Of The World - Celtic	Released: March 3, 1998; Label: Alula Records; Format: Compact disc
The Song Poets	Released: October 6, 1998; Label: 1-800 Prime CD; Format: Compact disc
The Most Beautiful Melodies Of Irish Music	Released: February 23, 1999; Label: Celtophile Records; Format: Compact disc
At Home for the Holidays with the Folk Next Door	Released: December 3, 1999; Label: Folk Next Door; Format: Compact disc
Now and Tomorrow	Released: 2001; Label: Legacy Recordings; Format: Compact disc
The Best Of Sessions at West 54th	Released: September 4, 2001; Label: Sony Records; Format: Compact disc
Especially for Mother	Released: May 28, 2002; Label: Prism Leisure Corporation; Format: Compact disc
fRoots 23	Released: August 1, 2004; Label: FRoots; Format: Compact disc
The Celtic Circle: 2	Released: October 12, 2004; Label: Legacy Recordings; Format: Compact disc
The Folk Awards 2005	Released: February 14, 2005; Label: Proper Records; Format: Compact disc
Our New Orleans: A Benefit Album for the Gulf Coast	Released: December 6, 2005; Label: Nonesuch Records; Format: Compact disc
Ceol	Released: March 3, 2006; Label: Seachtain na Gaeilge; Format: Compact disc
Celtic Dreamland	Released: November 20, 2007; Label: Putumayo World Music; Format: Compact disc
Absolutely Irish	Released: September 2, 2008; Label: Compass Records; Format: Compact disc
Irish Pirate Ballads And Other Songs Of The Sea	Released: December 13, 2008; Label: Smithsonian Folkways; Format: Compact disc
Radio Woodstock: 30 Years & Counting	Released: November 1, 2010; Label: WDST; Format: Compact disc
Lullabies for Love: A Celtic Collection to Benefit One Home Many Hopes	Released: June 24, 2011; Label: Compass Records; Format: Compact disc
