= Tanglewood Tree =

Studio album by Dave Carter and Tracy Grammer
- Released: March 14, 2000
- Recorded: November 1999
- Genre: Folk; Singer-songwriter
- Length: 39:34
- Label: Signature Sounds
- Producer: Dave Carter; Tracy Grammer

Dave Carter and Tracy Grammer chronology
When I Go (1998)	Tanglewood Tree (2000)	Drum Hat Buddha (2001)

Professional ratings
Review scores
Source	Rating
AllMusic	4/5 stars
Dirty Linen	favorable
Kevin McCarthy	favorable
Rambles	favorable
Sing Out!	favorable

Tanglewood Tree is a 2000 album by American folk duo Dave Carter and Tracy Grammer.

== Track listing ==
All songs written by Dave Carter.

1. "Happytown (All Right with Me)" – 3:34
2. "Tanglewood Tree" – 3:42
3. "The Mountain" – 3:39
4. "Farewell to Saint Dolores" – 4:29
5. "Hey Conductor" – 3:20
6. "Crocodile Man" – 3:02
7. "Walkin' Away from Caroline" – 5:09
8. "Farewell to Fiddler's Rim" – 2:12
9. "Cat-Eye Willie Claims His Lover" – 4:06
10. "Cowboy Singer" – 3:44
11. "Farewell to Bitterroot Valley" – 2:37

== Credits ==
Produced by Dave Carter & Tracy Grammer.

- Dave Carter: guitar, banjo, piano, Hammond organ, vocals
- Tracy Grammer: guitar, violin, mandolin, vocals
- Lorne Entress: drums and percussion
- Bob Dick: upright bass
- Richard Gates: electric bass
- Roger Williams: Dobro guitar
- Chris Turner: harmonica
