= Seven Is the Number =

Studio album by Dave Carter and Tracy Grammer
- Released: October 17, 2006
- Recorded: December 26, 2001 – January 2, 2002
- Genre: folk, singer-songwriter
- Label: Tracy Grammer Music

Dave Carter and Tracy Grammer chronology
Flower of Avalon (2005)	Seven Is the Number (2006)

Professional ratings
Review scores
Source	Rating
FolkWax	(9/10)
Kevin McCarthy	(favorable) link
MusicMatters	(favorable) link
Sing Out!	(favorable)

Seven Is the Number is a 2006 album by American folk duo Dave Carter and Tracy Grammer. It was the duo's final recording, released over four years after Carter's unexpected death due to a heart attack in July 2002.

Nine of the songs were previously recorded by Carter for his 1995 solo release, Snake Handlin' Man (now out of print). These songs were re-recorded along with two new Dave Carter songs, "Seven Is the Number" and "Gas Station Girl" in December 2001. Unlike the duo's previous two albums, Tracy Grammer does not sing lead vocals on any of the songs. As with their first album together, When I Go, her role on this recording is more that of a supporting musician adding harmony to Carter's lead vocals and solid instrumental work on fiddle, mandolin and guitar.

== Track listing ==
All songs written by Dave Carter.

1. "Seven Is the Number" – 2:40
2. "Snake-Handlin Man" – 3:35
3. "Red (Elegy)" – 3:31
4. "The Promised Land" – 3:27
5. "Hey Tonya" – 3:50
6. "Texas Underground" – 3:51
7. "Gas Station Girl" – 4:00
8. "Long, Black Road into Tulsa Town" – 5:30
9. "Workin for Jesus" – 4:58
10. "Gun-Metal Eyes" – 5:49
11. "Sarah Turn 'Round" – 4:51
