= Monica Rizzio =

American singer-songwriter (born 1980)

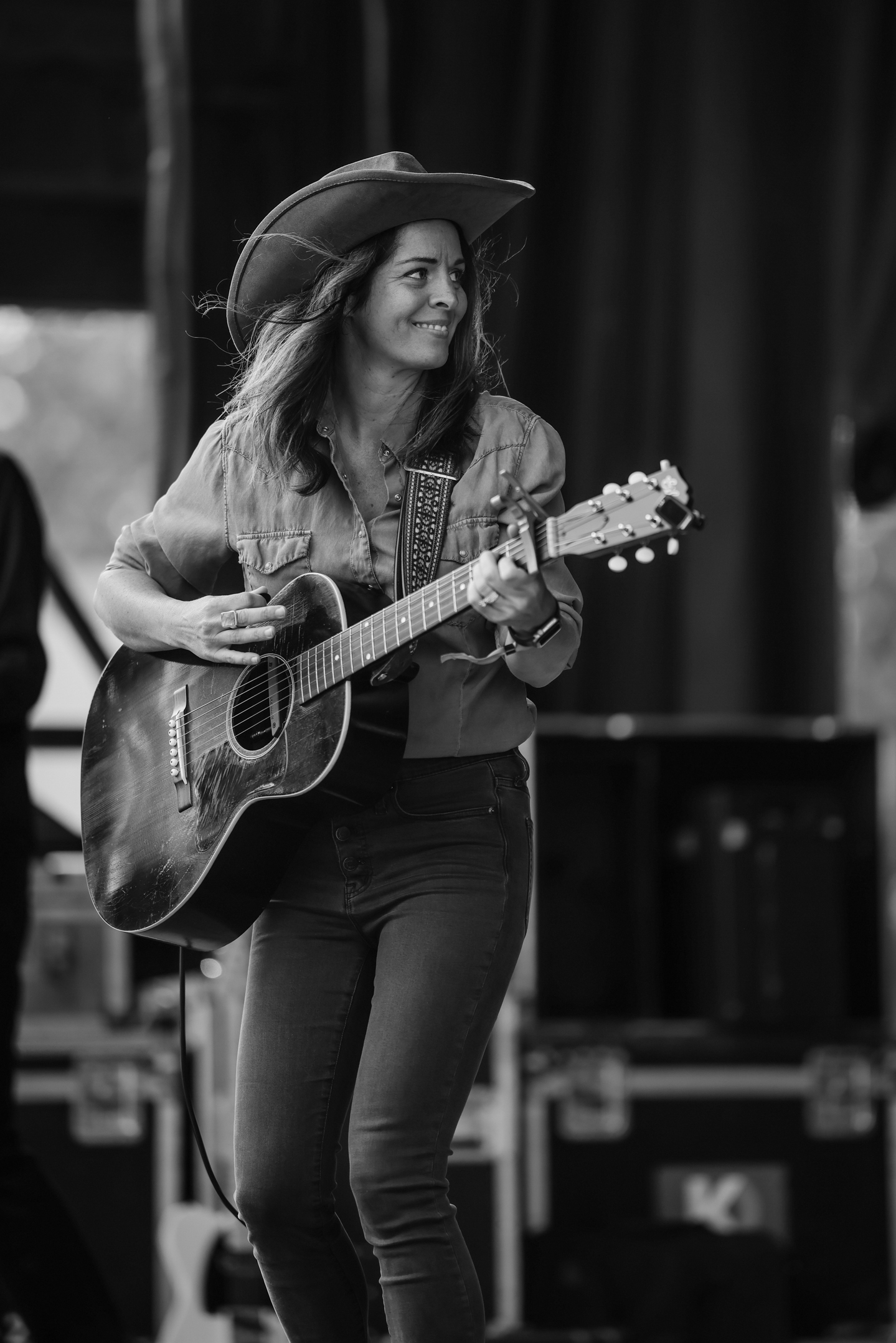
- Singer-Songwriter Monica Rizzio at 2023 Vinegrass Festival

Background information
- Born: 1980 (age 45–46)
- Origin: Quitman, Texas
- Genre: Americana (roots)
- Occupations: Musician, singer-songwriter, educator
- Instruments: guitar, fiddle, uke
- Label: Washashore Music
- Website: https://monicarizzio.com/

Monica Rizzio (born 1980) is an American roots singer-songwriter, multi-instrumentalist, and educator. Her music blends Americana and country influences, shaped by her Texas upbringing and her life in New England. She was the lead vocalist and co-founder of the folk and country group Tripping Lilly, with whom she released four albums before pursuing a solo career. As of 2024, she had released three solo albums, and has received regional and national recognition for her storytelling and songwriting.

Rizzio is also known for her collaborations with other artists in the genre. She co-founded the non-profit Vinegrass Organization which had raised over $115,000 as of 2024 to support music education through scholarships, grants and instrument donations.

== Musical career ==
Monica Rizzio co-founded the folk and country music group Tripping Lily in 2004, serving as the band's lead vocalist. The group released four albums, and in 2011 won two Independent Music Awards for Best Folk Record and Best Acoustic Song.

Rizzio left Tripping Lily in 2012 to pursue a solo career. She released her debut solo album Washashore Cowgirl in 2015, an autobiographical record featuring collaborations with Mark Erelli, Charlie Rose, Sierra Hull, and others. Jon Evans, the bassist for Tori Amos, produced the album and also played bass. The album debuted at number 7 on the FolkDJ Top Albums of the Month in March 2016, while the single "Willie Nelson" ranked number 9 on the FolkDJ Top Songs chart for the same month. Another single, "Luckier Than You," ranked number 77 by the Roots Music Report in their Top Folk Song Chart for the Year 2016.

Rizzio released her second solo album Sunshine is Free in 2019, recorded in Nashville with fellow singer-songwriters including Mindy Smith, Michael Rinne, Gwen Sebastian, Aaron Raitiere, Carl Anderson, Mark Erelli, and Hayley Sabella. The album ranked number 61 in the Top 100 Albums of the Month on the Folk DJ Chart in November 2019. That same year, Rizzio released the single "Lady Liberty" featuring Tom Rush, Patty Larkin, and Mark Erelli.

== Collaborations ==
Rizzio regularly shares the stage with other musicians in the folk and roots genre, including bluegrass artist Sierra Hull and veteran folk singer-songwriter Tom Rush. She performed with Rush at his 2014 Symphony Hall concert, after which Rush quipped, "I made the tactical error of inviting Monica Rizzio to share the stage with me at Symphony Hall, and she went and stole the audience right out from under me!" Rizzio joined Rush in 2022 as a featured artist on his 7-day tour North to Alaska with Tom Rush and Friends, helping advance her presence in the folk and Americana music scene.

Beyond her collaborations with Rush, Rizzio has also performed with the Cape Cod Symphony Orchestra and has been a supporting act for artists such as Chris Botti, Boz Scaggs, Diana Krall, Joan Osborne, and Slaid Cleaves.

Rizzio is a coordinator and one of five judges for the long-running annual New England Songwriting Contest. Established in 2000 as a non-profit venture, the competition aims to support and recognize New England artists and provide meaningful opportunities and recognition to participants.

== Vinegrass Organization ==
Rizzio and her husband, Peter Fasano, founded the Vinegrass Organization in 2013 as a non-profit music production company dedicated to supporting the American roots music genre through scholarships, grants, and community outreach. Rizzio has cited her upbringing as an influence in founding Vinegrass, stating "Growing up on a ranch in East Texas, if it weren’t for the people in the community supporting me I might not be the professional musician I am today. I wanted to find a way to pay that back, to try and support people here in my community."

Each year, Vinegrass awards several sustaining four-year music scholarships to students pursuing music degrees at accredited universities, with a preference to those studying within the American Roots and Rhythm genre. As of 2024, the organization had awarded over $115,000 to students. Vinegrass also donates musical instruments to young students in need.

Since 2014, the annual Vinegrass Music Festival has served as the organization's main fundraising initiative. It is the longest-running Bluegrass/Americana music festival on Cape Cod. Past performers at the festival have included Mandolin Orange aka Watchhouse, Slaid Cleaves, Jeffrey Foucault, Mark Erelli, Paronsfield, YARN, Charlie Parr, and Dangermuffin. The organization also hosts smaller concerts, camps and workshops throughout the year to further its mission, and as of 2024 had produced over 150 Americana and Bluegrass events.

== Critical reception ==
Monica Rizzio has earned national recognition for her contributions to the Americana and Roots genres. Her songwriting has often been described as deeply personal, with a blending of southern charm and modern living. Her debut album Washashore Cowgirl earned a nomination for Country Album of the Year by the Independent Music Awards in 2016.

Billboard described Rizzio's 2019 album Sunshine is Free as featuring "delicate acoustic guitar, steady percussion, soaring electric guitar parts, and warm vocals." Lonesome Highways compared the upbeat and happy feel of the album's title track to the style of John Prine. The Amp praised Rizzio for her songwriting, noting that she has the ability to deliver her words with both emotional depth and the straightforward honesty of her voice.

Rizzio won the 2019 Grassy Hill Songwriting Competition at the long-running annual Connecticut Folk Festival, which helped expand her recognition in the folk community. The award led to a featured performance at the following year's festival, showcasing her original songs. In 2022, Rizzio was nominated for a Boston Music Award as Country Artist of the Year.

== Discography ==
With Tripping Lilly

- The Couch Sessions Live (2006)
- Ukelele (2008)
- The Day Everything Became Nothing (2009)
- Summer (2012)

Solo Albums

- All Wrapped Up for the Holidays (2012)
- Washashore Cowgirl (2016)
- Sunshine is Free (2019, Washashore Music)
