= Drum Hat Buddha =

Studio album by Dave Carter and Tracy Grammer
- Released: June 12, 2001
- Recorded: December 2000
- Genres: Folk; Singer-songwriter
- Length: 41:22
- Label: Signature Sounds
- Producers: Dave Carter and Tracy Grammer with assistance from Billy Oskay

Dave Carter and Tracy Grammer chronology
| Tanglewood Tree (2000) | Drum Hat Buddha (2001) | The Verdant Mile (2004) |

Professional ratings
Review scores
| Source | Rating |
|---|---|
| Allmusic | 4/5 stars |
| Dirty Linen | (favorable) |
| FolkWax | (10/10) |
| Freight Train Boogie | link |
| Kevin McCarthy | (favorable) link |
| Music Matters | (favorable) link |
| Rambles | (favorable) link |
| Sing Out! | (favorable) |

Drum Hat Buddha is a 2001 album by American folk duo Dave Carter and Tracy Grammer.

== Track listing ==
All songs written by Dave Carter.

1. "Ordinary Town" – 2:48
2. "Tillman Co." – 3:26
3. "Disappearing Man" – 3:49
4. "The Power and Glory" – 2:45
5. "236–6132" – 3:04
6. "41 Thunderer" – 5:03
7. "Gentle Arms of Eden" – 3:03
8. "I Go Like the Raven" – 3:35
9. "Highway 80 (She's a Mighty Good Road)" – 2:23
10. "Love, the Magician" – 4:18
11. "Merlin's Lament" – 3:35
12. "Gentle Soldier of My Soul" – 3:28

== Credits ==
- Accordion – Eric Park (7)
- Backing Vocals – Claire Bard (tracks: 3)
- Cello – Nancy Ives
- Drums, Percussion – Lorne Entress
- Electric Bass, Acoustic Bass – Donny Wright
- Mastered By – David Glasser
- Resonator Guitar [Slide] – Tim Darby
- Violin, Harmonium, Recorded By – Billy Oskay
- Vocals, Guitar, Banjo, Harmonium, Mandolin, Organ, Producer, Written-By – Dave Carter (3)
- Vocals, Violin, Mandolin, Guitar, Percussion, Producer – Tracy Grammer
