= News Record =

The News Record may refer to the following newspapers:

- News & Record, Greensboro, North Carolina
- The News Record (Cincinnati), University of Cincinnati
- News-Record (Wisconsin), Neenah, Wisconsin
- News Record, a former name of NJToday.net, New Jersey
