= Dave McCann =

Dave or David McCann may refer to:

- David McCann (cyclist) (born 1973), Irish racing cyclist
- Dave McCann (Canadian football) (1889–1959), Canadian Football League player, official, coach, and executive
- Dave McCann (sportscaster), evening anchor for KSL-TV, Salt Lake City, Utah; and play-by-play broadcaster, BYUtv
- Dave McCann (singer-songwriter) (born 1972), Canadian songwriter and performer
- David McCann (rugby union) (born 2000), Irish rugby union player
