= NJToday.net =

CMD Media LLC
- Company type: Newspaper
- Industry: Publishing
- Predecessor: News Record, Atom Tabloid
- Founded: Elizabeth, New Jersey, USA 2006
- Founder: Lisa McCormick
- Headquarters: Elizabeth, New Jersey, USA
- Key people: Lisa McCormick (Publisher and CEO), Robert Milici (Associate Publisher), Paul W. Hadsall, Jr. (Editor), James J. Devine (Contributing Editor)
- Products: NJTODAY.NET newspaper, website
- Services: community news, advertising
- Revenue: <$500,000
- Number of employees: 12
- Website: WWW.NJTODAY.NET

NJTODAY.NET
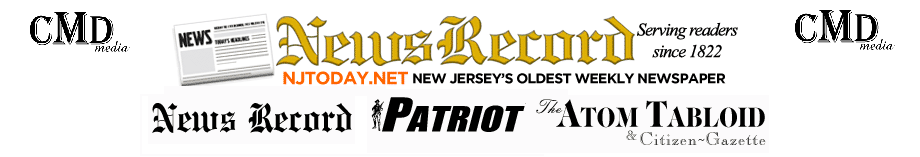
- NJTODAY.NET incorporates several earlier newspapers, including the News Record and Atom Tabloid
- Type: Community news organization
- Format: Tabloid and website
- Owner(s): CMD Media, LLC
- Publisher: Lisa McCormick
- Editor: Paul W. Hadsall, Jr.
- Staff writers: James J. Devine
- Founded: 1822
- Headquarters: CMD Media, LLC corporate headquarters are in Elizabeth, New Jersey; NJTODAY.NET editorial offices are located in Elizabeth, New Jersey
- Circulation: 25,000
- Website: njtoday.net

NJToday.net is New Jersey's oldest weekly newspaper in both its printed (ISSN 2328-6113) and online (ISSN 2328-6121) formats.

Established in 1822 and formerly known as the News Record, NJToday.net offers local news coverage of communities throughout Union and Middlesex counties in New Jersey.

The Editor is Paul W. Hadsall, Jr. and the Publisher is Lisa McCormick. Among the regular contributors is James J. Devine, a controversial Democratic Party strategist and political commentator who authors a column entitled Voice of the People. The newspaper is published every Friday.

== History ==
Established in 1822 as the Bridgeton Museum and later renamed the National Advocate, NJToday.net is the oldest weekly newspaper in continuous publication in the Garden State.

Over the years, the publication underwent a variety of name changes and mergers. In 1946, the Rahway News and the Rahway Record merged, with the new paper called the Rahway News-Record and taking on the numbering of the Rahway Record.

In 1997, the Rahway News-Record was purchased by Devine Media Enterprises, owned by James J. Devine. The paper's distribution expanded beyond Rahway to include Elizabeth, Linden and the rest of Union County, New Jersey. CMD Media acquired the News Record and Lisa McCormick became its publisher in 2006. The paper was re-branded as NJToday.net in 2010 to tie the weekly print edition with expanded online content at the publication's website.

Publications that have been absorbed into NJToday.net include: The News Record, Clark Patriot, Atom Tabloid, South Amboy Citizen, Perth Amboy Gazette, Amboy Beacon, and Kid Zone magazine.
