= When I Go =

Studio album by Dave Carter and Tracy Grammer
- Released: October 10, 1998, Red River (self-released); 2002 Signature Sounds (re-release)
- Recorded: Tracy Grammer's kitchen Portland, Oregon, US
- Genre: Folk; Singer-songwriter
- Length: mm:ss
- Label: Red River Records/Signature Sounds
- Producer: Mark Frethem; Dave Carter; Tracy Grammer

Dave Carter and Tracy Grammer chronology
Snake Handlin' Man (1995)	When I Go (1998)	Tanglewood Tree (2000)

Professional ratings
Review scores
Source	Rating
Allmusic	link
Dirty Linen	Favorable
Sing Out!	Favorable

When I Go is a 1998 album by American folk duo Dave Carter and Tracy Grammer.

== Track listing ==
All songs written by Dave Carter.

1. "When I Go" – 4:16
2. "Don't Tread on Me" – 3:23
3. "Annie's Lover" – 2:52
4. "Grand Prairie TX Homesick Blues" – 3:23
5. "Kate and the Ghost of Lost Love" – 4:24
6. "The River, Where She Sleeps" – 4:20
7. "Lancelot" – 4:44
8. "Frank to Valentino" – 3:09
9. "Little Liza Jane" – 5:08
10. "Elvis Presley" – 4:42

== Credits ==
Musicians:

- Dave Carter – guitar, banjo, bass & vocals
- Tracy Grammer – violin, mandolin, guitar & vocals
- Eric Park – harmonica & accordion

Production:

- Produced by Dave Carter & Tracy Grammer
- Recorded in Tracy Grammer's kitchen in Portland, Oregon, except "Frank to Valentino", recorded in Donny Wright's garage, Portland, Oregon.
- Mixed by Mark Frethem, Doctor Digital, Portland, Oregon.
- Mastered by David Glasser, Airshow Mastering, Inc., Boulder, Colorado

Artwork:

- Photography in Acoma Pueblo (in the U.S. state of New Mexico) by Kathleen Williams, Majic Glass, Inc.
- Photography of duo by Dan Betenbender
- Graphic design by Tracy Grammer
