= Caffè Lena =

- Interactive map of Caffè Lena
- Location: Saratoga Springs, New York
- Coordinates: 43°04′50″N 73°47′00″W
- Type: Coffeehouse, non-profit

Construction
- Opened: 1960

Website
- http://www.caffelena.org/

Located in Saratoga Springs, New York, Caffè Lena is one of the oldest continually running coffee houses in the United States. Founded in 1960 by William and Lena Spencer (née Nargi), it claims to be the oldest folk-oriented coffee house, in the U.S., featuring acoustic concerts and cultural events showcasing folk music, traditional music, and singer-songwriters of a wide range, including artist Bob Dylan, who performed for two consecutive nights at the cafè in 1961, a year prior to the release of his debut album.

== History ==
During the COVID-19 pandemic of 2020–2021, Caffè Lena began streaming live music on a donation based pay scale, featuring the music of folk musicians like Kate McDonnell and Natalie Haas.

Since Lena Spencer's death on October 23, 1989 (she was born on January 4, 1923), Caffè Lena has been a not-for-profit organization.

In 2025, Caffè Lena celebrated 65 years in Saratoga Springs by holding its 4th annual Sing in the Streets festival.

== Bibliography ==
- Kristin Baggelaar and Donald Milton (1976) Folk Music: More Than A Song, p. 364-7, ISBN 0-690-01159-8.
- Kristin Baggelaar and Donald Milton (1977) The Folk Music Encyclopaedia, p. 364-7, ISBN 0-86001-396-0.
