= Bruce Katz =

American musician

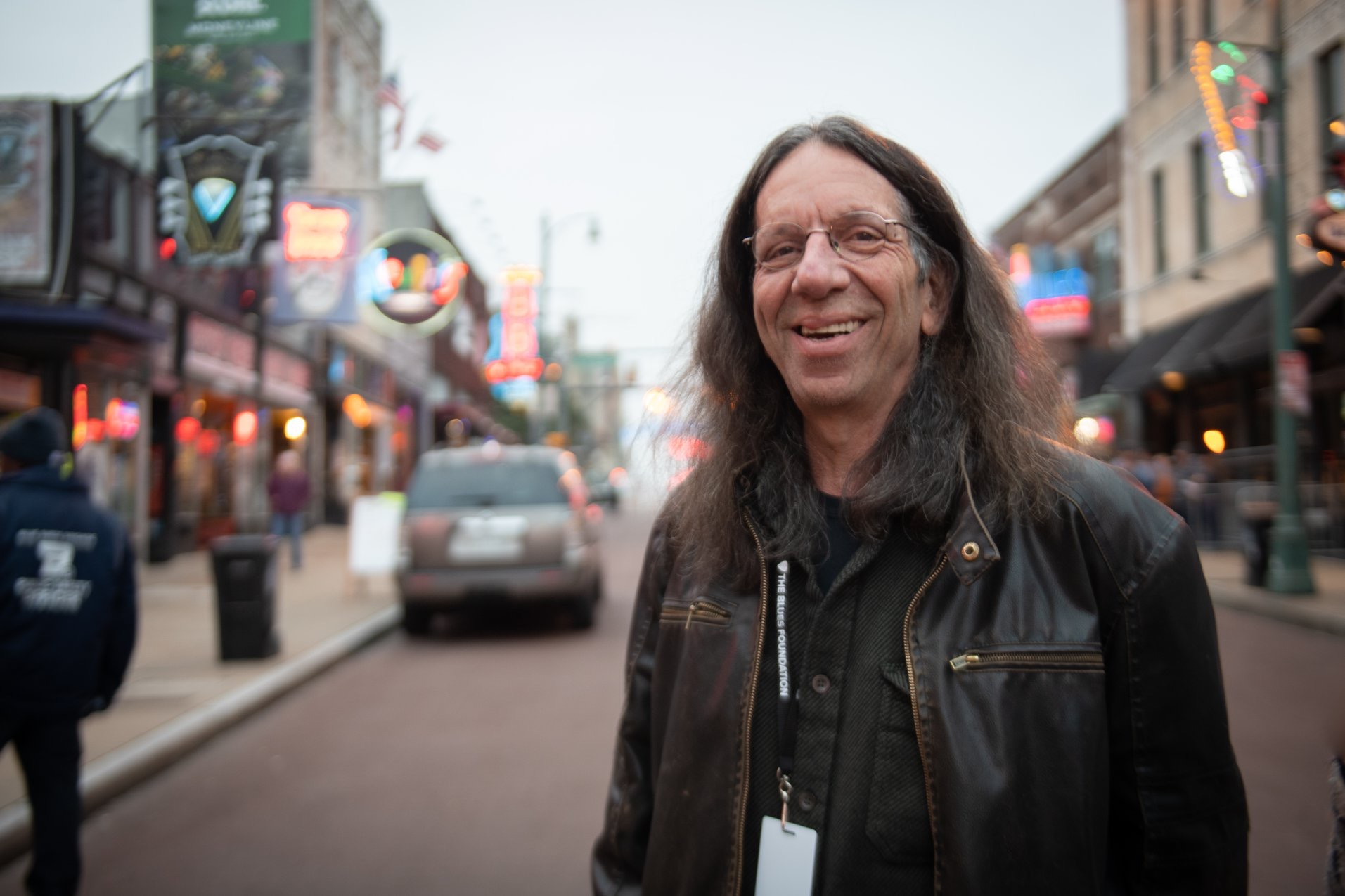

Background information
- Born: August 19, 1952 (age 73)
- Occupation: Musician
- Instruments: Piano; organ; bass guitar
- Website: www.brucekatzband.com

Bruce Katz (born August 19, 1952) is an American musician, playing piano, organ and bass guitar. From 1996 to 2010, he was on the faculty at the Berklee College of Music in Boston as an associate professor. He founded his own musical group, the Bruce Katz Band in 1991 and has recorded and toured with that band to the present. He has also recorded and toured with many other well-known artists in the Blues, Jazz and Rock music world.

== Biography ==
Katz, born in Brooklyn, NY, started playing classical piano at the age of 5. He began his professional musical career playing piano and bass guitar with various bands in Baltimore. He then decided to concentrate on piano and Hammond organ, and in particular, jazz and blues music. After studying music at the Berklee College of Music (1974–77) and playing primarily jazz in Boston, he got the opportunity to play bass guitar for Big Mama Thornton. This reconnected him with his love of the blues, which has been his main musical genre since that time.

From that band, Katz moved on to play with Barrence Whitfield and the Savages., touring extensively throughout the U.S. and Europe from 1986–1990 and recording three albums with that band.

From 1990–92 he enrolled at the New England Conservatory in Boston and received a Master's Degree in Jazz Performance.

After obtaining his Master's Degree, Katz formed The Bruce Katz Band with Marty Ballou and Lorne Entress and began recording on the Sledgehammer Blues (formerly AudioQuest Music) label. His first album as a leader, Crescent Crawl was released in 1992.

In 1992, he was also invited to join Ronnie Earl and the Broadcasters. While with Ronnie Earl from 1992–97, Katz recorded 6 albums, including Grateful Heart, which won the Downbeat Magazine "Blues Album of the Year" award in 1996. He left the Broadcasters in 1997 in order to concentrate on the Bruce Katz Band. From then until the present he has led his own band and simultaneously maintained a sought-after sideman status, recording and touring with many other artists, such as Delbert McClinton, Duke Robillard, Joe Louis Walker, Debbie Davies, David "Fathead" Newman, John Hammond and others.

From 2007 to 2013, Katz was a regular member of Gregg Allman and Friends. In 2011, he joined Delbert McClinton's Band and continued to play with him until 2014. He continues to play with John Hammond on occasion. Katz performed with Allman Brothers founding member Butch Trucks in two different groups --- 'Butch Trucks and the Freight Train Band' and 'Les Brers', a band that contained five members of the Allman Brothers Band and Katz on keyboards, Lamar Williams Jr. on vocals and Pat Bergeson on guitar, in addition to Butch Trucks, Jaimoe, Marc Quiñones, Oteil Burbridge on bass and Jack Pearson on guitar. Katz also performed with Jaimoe and 'Jaimoe's Jasssz Band', recording and writing on the Renaissance Man CD.

In 2014, Katz began to shift his primary focus to his own music and the Bruce Katz Band. In October 2014, Katz released Homecoming on the American Showplace Music record label. This album featured guests John P. Hammond, Randy Ciarlante, Jimmy Bennett, Marty Ballou, Peter Bennett, and was the first Bruce Katz Band album to feature vocals as well as instrumentals. Homecoming received critical and popular acclaim, garnering radio play in the US and worldwide, appearing at the top of Blues Radio charts. In 2016, he released another album on American Showplace Music, Out From The Center, which reached No. 1 on the Roots Music Report Blues Radio Chart.

In 2018, he released Get Your Groove! on American Showplace Music. This album featured Ray Hangen on drums and continued to combine original instrumental and vocal music. It also featured Jaimoe from the Allman Brothers Band on drums on three tracks, most notably a tribute to Butch Trucks called "Freight Train".

Katz won a Blues Music "Acoustic Album of the Year" for the trio record he collaborated on with Joe Louis Walker and Giles Robson, "Journeys to the Heart of the Blues". He released his first solo piano album titled Solo Ride on American Showplace Music in 2019. This all-instrumental album featured eleven original compositions and was a purely acoustic album featuring Katz playing at a grand piano. It was nominated by the Blues Foundation for a Blues Music Award Acoustic Album of the Year award in 2020.

== Awards and honors ==
- Blues Piano Player of the Year Blues Music Award Nominated 2008, 2009, 2014, 2015, 2019, 2020, 2021, 2025
- Acoustic Blues Album of the Year Blues Music Award Winner 2019 for "Journeys To The Heart of the Blues"
- Acoustic Blues Album of the Year Blues Music Award Nominee 2020 for "Solo Ride"
- Outstanding Keyboard Instrumentalist Living Blues Nominated 2017, 2019, 2024
- Album of the Year Blues Music Award Nominee 2019 for "Journeys To The Heart of the Blues"
- Contemporary Blues Album of the Year nomination, Blues Blast Magazine Award for "Connections", 2023
- Inducted into the New York Blues Hall of Fame 2013
- Blues Album of the Year Downbeat Grateful Heart as member of Ronnie Earl and the Broadcasters 1996

== Discography - As a bandleader ==
Year released	Title	Label	Notes
1992	Crescent Crawl	AudioQuest Music	
1994	Transformation	AudioQuest Music	
1997	Mississippi Moan	AudioQuest Music	
2000	Three Feet Off the Ground	AudioQuest Music	
2004	A Deeper Blue	Severn Records	
2008	Live! At the Firefly	Brown Dog/VizzTone Label Group	
2009	Project A (Bruce Katz and Joel Frahm)	Anzic Records	
2014	Homecoming	American Showplace Music	
2016	Out from the Center	American Showplace Music	
2018	Get Your Groove!	American Showplace Music	
2019	Solo Ride	American Showplace Music	
2019	Journeys to the Heart of the Blues (Bruce Katz, Joe Louis Walker, Giles Robson)	Alligator Records	
2023	Connections	Dancing Rooster Records	
2024	Back In Boston Live	Dancing Rooster Records	

== Selected recordings with other artists ==
- Barrence Whitfield and the Savages, Ow Ow Ow! 1986
- Mighty Sam McClain, Give it Up to Love 1993
- Ronnie Earl and the Broadcasters, Still River 1993
- Albert Washington, Step it Up and Go 1993
- Ronnie Earl and the Broadcasters, Language of the Soul 1994
- Jimmy Witherspoon, "Spoon's Blues" 1994
- Ronnie Earl and the Broadcasters, Blues Guitar Virtuoso – Live in Europe 1995
- Mighty Sam McClain, Keep on Movin' 1996
- Ronnie Earl and the Broadcasters, Grateful Heart 1996
- Kenny Neal/Tab Benoit/Debbie Davies, Lonesome for the Road 1996
- Ronnie Earl and the Broadcasters, The Colour of Love 1997
- Joe Beard, Dealin' 1998
- Mighty Sam McClain, Journey 1998
- Joe Beard, For Real 2000
- Mighty Sam McClain, Sweet Dreams 2001
- Bryan Lee, Six String Therapy 2002
- Duke Robillard, Living with the Blues 2002
- Debbie Davies, Key to Love 2003
- Bryan Lee, Live and Dangerous 2004
- Little Milton, What About Me? 2005
- Debbie Davies,All I Found 2005
- John Hammond, Push Comes to Shove 2006
- Eric Mingus, Healing Howl 2007
- Paul Rishell & Annie Raines, A Night in Woodstock 2008
- Joe Louis Walker, Witness to the Blues 2008
- Alexis P. Suter, Just Another Fool 2008
- Duke Robillard, A Swinging Session 2008
- Jaimoe's Jasssz Band, Renaissance Man 2012
- Delbert McClinton, Blind, Crippled and Crazy 2013
- Giles Robson, Don't Give Up on the Blues 2019
- Hurricane Ruth, Good Life 2020
- Sean Chambers, That's What I'm Talkin' About 2020
- Tas Cru, Riffin' the Blues 2022
- Arlen Roth, Jerry Jemmott, Super Soul Session 2023

== Bruce Katz Band members ==
- Bruce Katz - 1991–present, piano and organ
- Lorne Entress - 1991–1995, drums
- Marty Ballou - 1991–1993, bass
- Kevin Barry - 1992–1995, guitar
- David Clark - 1993–1994, bass
- John Payne - 1993–1994, saxophone
- Paul Bryan - 1994, bass
- Tom Hall - 1994–1998, saxophone
- Ralph Rosen - 1995–2016, drums
- Julien Kasper - 1996–2003, guitar
- Mark Poniatowski - 1995–1999, bass
- Blake Newman - 1999–2002, bass
- Ed Spargo - 2002–2003, bass
- Rod Carey - 2003–2009, bass
- Michael Williams - 2003–2006, guitar
- Christopher Vitarello - 2006–2011, 2013–2018, guitar and vocals
- Jimmy Bennett - 2011–2013, guitar and vocals
- Ray Hangen - 2016–2020, drums
- Aaron Lieberman (Aaron Maxwell) - 2019–present, guitar and vocals
- Liviu Pop - 2020–present, drums
