= Kate McDonnell =

American singer-songwriter

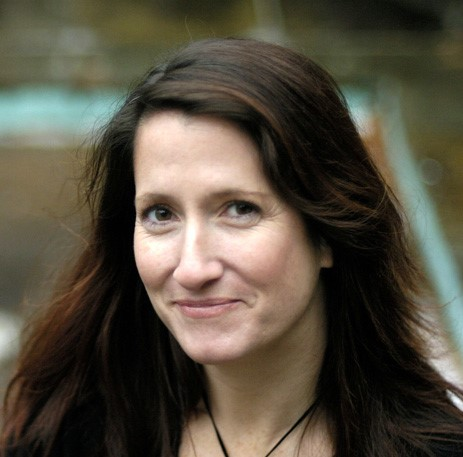

Background information
- Birth name: Katherine (Kate) Lindsay McDonnell
- Born: March 7, 1961 (age 64)
- Genres: Folk
- Occupations: Musician- songwriter
- Years active: 1990s–present
- Website: https://katemcdonnell.com/

Kate McDonnell is an American folk singer and songwriter.

== Career ==
In her teens and early 20s, she was part of a duo with her sister, Anne McDonnell. They self-produced the LP, "Middle Flight," in 1980, through Owen Productions. From 1989 to 1992, she was part of the duo McDonnell–Tane with Freddie Tane. They opened for Bob Dylan, Suzanne Vega, Kathy Mattea, Willie Nelson, Judy Collins, Leo Kottke, and Arlo Guthrie.

McDonnell released her first solo album, Broken Bones reissued by Waterbug Records in 1994. She was voted #1 singer/songwriter in the New Haven Advocate, New Haven, Connecticut, in 1994. Her 1998 album Next was reviewed in the Boston Globe: "Arrangements ... centered on McDonnell's soaring soprano vocals, expressive acoustic guitar finger picking"... "With her poetic songs... she shares life with an unforgettable impact". She has played at the Falcon Ridge Folk Festival, and the Kerrville Folk Festival.

In 2001, her CD "Don't Get Me Started" was released on the Swiss label Brambus records. Rani Arbo in Acoustic Guitar wrote: "Kate McDonnell applies a polished and subtle musicianship to bluegrass, swing tunes, and classic single–songwriter fare." When the finger picked or flat-picked, the guitar is rhythmically solid, fleet and energetic... best of all, McDonnell's voice has a sweet patina that complements her stylized yet unaffected delivery and stays fresh throughout". That year, McDonnell performed at the Newport Folk Festival, and in 2002 she won first place at the Mountain Stage Festival new song competition for "Go Down Moses."

== Discography ==
- Middle Flight, Katie & Anne McDonnell (1980)
- Volcanic Rendezvous, Kate McDonnell–Freddie Tane (1991)
- Broken Bones (1992)
- Next (1998)
- Don't Get Me Started (2001)
- Where the Mangoes Are, (2005)
- Ballad of a Bad Girl (2021)
