= Lui Collins =

American musician

Lui Collins (born 1950 in Barre, Vermont) is a contemporary folk singer-songwriter. She attended the University of Connecticut and played her first gigs as a student there. She began touring in the mid-1970s as part of duos with Horace Williams Jr., Guy Wolff and Bill Lauf Jr., and all four received "produced by" credit on her first album, "Made in New England," 1978. Originally a Philo Fretless LP, that album was later reissued as a CD by Green Linnet Records in 1985, GLCD 1056. From her first recording, her albums included her own compositions as well as others written by her performing partners and friends, including Williams, Lauf, Julie Snow, and others. Her albums have included some children's music, some of which she co-wrote with children's author Jane Yolen. In 1997 Collins relocated to the Pioneer Valley in western Massachusetts, immersing herself in music. In addition to her solo performances in concerts, festivals and schools, Collins has performed extensively with singer-songwriter and multi-instrumentalist Dana Robinson. Together they released two limited edition collaborative recordings, Paired Down and Paired Down Vol. 2, in 1998 and 1999 respectively.

Collins played guitar and piano on earlier albums, and took up clawhammer banjo in 1999, in time to play it on her 2000 record Leaving Fort Knox. She currently performs both solo and with Grammy-nominated producer and guitarist Anand Nayak.

== Discography ==
- Made in New England (1978)
- Baptism of Fire (1981)
- There's A Light (1985), including "All You Can Do"
- Moondancer (1993)
- North of Mars (1995)
- Stone by Stone (1997)
- Leaving Fort Knox (2000)
- Closer (2006)
- The Infinite Dark (2018) as Jane Yolen & 3 Ravens
- Alive at Home (2020) live concert audio/video USB
- Fall Favorites (2025) as Lui Collins w/ Anand Nayak
- Winter Highlights (2025) as Lui Collins w/ Anand Nayak
- Sounds of Spring (2025) as Lui Collins w/ Anand Nayak
- Summer Stars (2025) as Lui Collins w/ Anand Nayak
