= Ratsy =

American singer

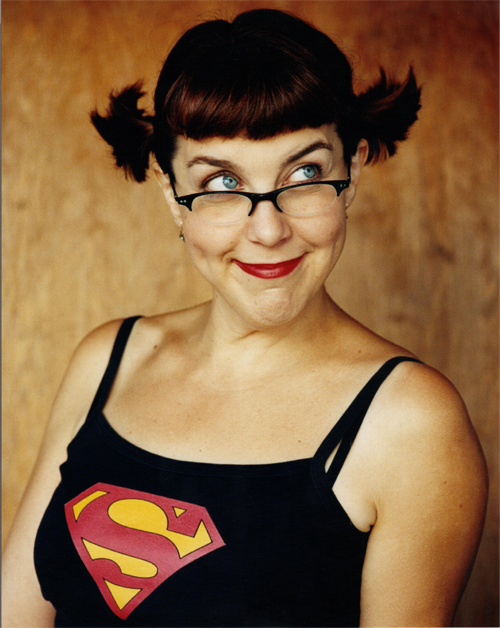

Background information
- Born: Jackson, Michigan, US
- Genres: Folk, indie rock
- Occupations: Singer, lyricist, busker
- Instrument: guitar

Ratsy (real name Patty Kemp; born in Jackson, Michigan) is a folk singer-songwriter who was part of the Boston folk scene. She is known for her quirky and humorous lyrics.

== Biography ==
After attending Michigan State University and graduating from beauty school with a cosmetology license, she moved to Boston and sang in the subway. She performed in local coffeehouses and at colleges.

In 1999, she moved to Hollywood and began appearing in commercials while continuing her musical career. She took up with the lindy hop community, and took lessons in swing dancing. She appeared in a 2002 episode of Gilmore Girls, as a featured dancer during an episode focusing on a dance marathon. She has since relocated to Oberlin, Ohio, where she runs a vintage antique shop, Ratsy's Store.

== Discography ==
- The Subway Songstress Years (1992)
- Squished Under a Train (1995)
- Flowery Swimsuit: The Live Album (2000)
