= Flower of Avalon =

Studio album by Tracy Grammer
- Released: April 26, 2005
- Genres: Folk; Singer-songwriter
- Length: 45:06
- Label: Signature Sounds
- Producer: John Jennings

Tracy Grammer chronology
The Verdant Mile (2004)	Flower of Avalon (2005)	Seven is the Number (2006)

Professional ratings
Review scores
Source	Rating
Acoustic Guitar	(favorable)
Dirty Linen	(favorable)
FAME	(favorable) link
Kevin McCarthy	(favorable) link
Music Matters	(favorable) link
No Depression	(favorable)
Rambles	(favorable) link
Sing Out!	(favorable)

Flower of Avalon is a 2005 album by American folk singer Tracy Grammer. This was her first full solo album following the death of Dave Carter in 2002. The recording offered Grammer's take on nine previously unrecorded songs written by Carter and one traditional tune. The album was very well received in reviews and was the most played album in 2005 on the Folk Radio Airplay Chart.

== Track listing ==
1. "Shadows of Evangeline" (Carter) – 3:57
2. "Gypsy Rose" (Carter) – 5:03
3. "Laughlin Boy" (Jolliff, Traditional) – 4:26
4. "Hard to Make It (Carter) – 3:35
5. "Hey Ho" (Carter) – 3:49
6. "Mother, I Climbed" (Carter) – 5:46
7. "Preston Miller" (Carter) – 4:41
8. "Winter When He Goes" (Carter) – 5:01
9. "Phantom Doll" (Carter) – 4:07
10. "Any Way I Do" (Carter) – 4:40
