= Mark Erelli =

American folk musician (born 1974)

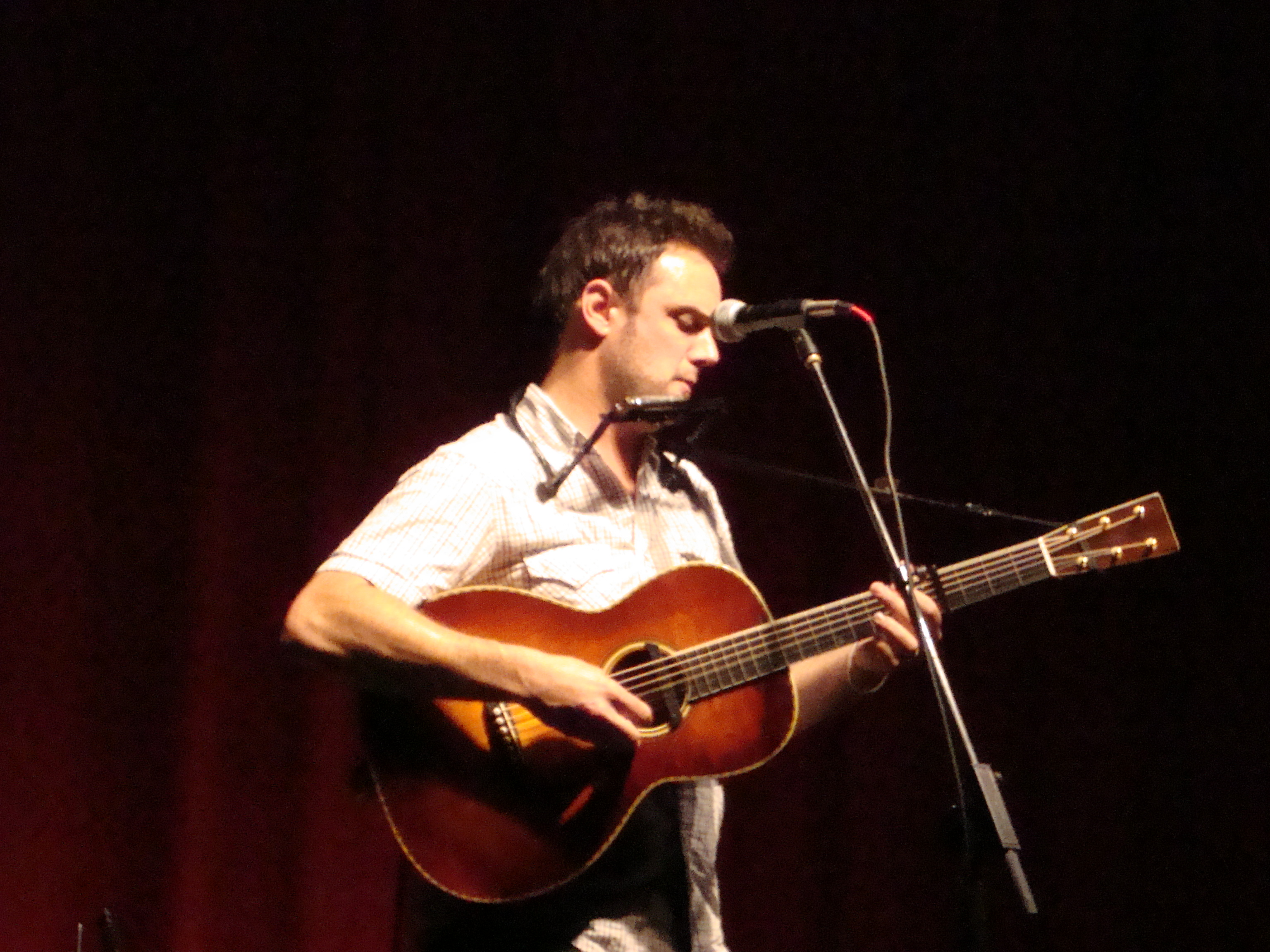
- Erelli performing at the Woody Guthrie Folk Festival in July 2009.

Background information
- Born: 20 June 1974 (age 52); Boston, Massachusetts, U.S.
- Genres: Americana; folk; pop; country
- Occupations: Musician; songwriter
- Instruments: Vocals; guitar; mandolin; harmonica
- Years active: 1999–present
- Label: Signature Sounds
- Website: markerelli.com

Mark Erelli (born June 20, 1974) is an American singer/songwriter, multi-instrumentalist, and touring folk musician from Reading, Massachusetts who earned a master's degree in evolutionary biology from the University of Massachusetts Amherst before pursuing a career in music. Erelli has released nine solo albums and three collaborative albums. His self-titled debut album was released in 1999, the same year that he won the Kerrville Folk Festival's New Folk Award. His first recording for the Signature Sounds label, Compass & Companion, spent ten weeks in the Top Ten on the Americana Chart. Erelli has worked as a side musician for singer songwriters Lori McKenna and Josh Ritter. He has performed at various music festivals and shared the stage with John Hiatt, Dave Alvin, and Gillian Welch. Erelli's song “People Look Around”, which he co-wrote with Catie Curtis, was the Grand Prize winner at the 2005 International Songwriting Competition. His songs have been recorded by Ellis Paul, Vance Gilbert, Antje Duvekot, and Red Molly.

== Early life and education ==
Erelli was born in Boston and grew up in the town of Reading, Massachusetts. Erelli performed in numerous high school musicals and founded the band, Freddie and Slip. Later he was a member of the band Organic Ice Cube and wrote his first song "Hell In the Sky" as a member of the band Dead Flowers (Greg Pothier, Scott Collins, Brian Moynihan, Kevin Larimore, Kris Tuscano, Chris Kerrigan Borning). Erelli was introduced to the music of Patty Larkin, Chris Smither, and other singer-songwriters by listening to the radio station WBOS. He formed the Mark Erelli Band and in 1997 released the album Long Way From Heaven. After attending the North East Folk Alliance Conference in 1997, Erelli signed a recording contract with Signature Sounds Recordings. He was awarded the Iguana Music Fund Fellowship award from Cambridge's Club Passim and used the proceeds to build a home studio.

Erelli attended Bates College in Lewiston, Maine and in 1997 enrolled at the University of Massachusetts Amherst where he obtained a master's degree in evolutionary biology in 1999.

== Career ==
Erelli's self-titled debut CD was released on the Signature Sounds label in 1999. Produced by Lorne Entress, Erelli was backed by musicians Duke Levine, Kevin Barry, Jim Lamond, Dave Dick, Joe Barbato, Roger Williams, and Mike Dinallo and guest vocalists, Rani Arbo, Louise Taylor, and Ben Demerath. He later won the Kerrville Folk Festival's New Folk Award in the same year.

The following year, Erelli's sophomore recording for Signature Sounds, Compass & Companion was released. Again produced by Entress, it features a title-song duet with country artist Kelly Willis. Duke Levine and Kevin Barry once again lent support on guitar along with Dave Dick on banjo and Entress on the jaw harp and percussion. The album charted for ten weeks in the Top Ten of the Americana Music Chart. Later that year Erelli was nominated for two Boston Music Awards.

Erelli's next project was to forego the traditional studio and instead gather a group of musicians to play within the walls of the Civil War era Memorial Hall in Monson, Massachusetts. Over the course of four days in May 2001, Erelli sat down in a semi-circle on the stage of the hall with Lorne Entress, Joe Barbato, Kevin Barry, Jim Henry, and Jim Lamond. The recording machines were turned on and everything was captured over the next four days. The recording sessions were also captured on film and later aired as a documentary on PBS.

In 2004, Erelli hooked up with Boston-based country band The Spurs to delve into the worlds of Western swing, country, and rockabilly with the release of Hillbilly Pilgrim. Erin McKeown is a guest vocalist on "Pretend." "For folk fans, this disc may take some getting used to, but its pleasures are many."

Erelli co-produced, with Lorne Entress, his fifth Signature Sounds album Hope & Other Casualties, which was released in 2006. When Erelli was asked if it was a concept album, he said: "The country has been through a lot, since 2000 really. Before September 11, that election of 2000 was a major thing. So, all the songs come out of that context. If the songs seem related, they all come out of that context over the last four years and they’re all coming through my lens and how I’m looking at the world. They all, in kinda one way or another, deal with the issue of how do you keep on keepin’ on when things seem really grim." Sometimes viewed as his most political album, "Hope & Other Casualties" is "an attentive examination of current times interwoven with matters of the heart. His emotions straddle the ground between the personal and the political." Guest vocalists include Kris Delmhorst and Jeffrey Foucault. Hope & Other Casualties was voted the number one album of 2006 by WUMB radio member listeners.

Innocent When You Dream, released in 2007, is a collection of lullabies and love songs, which features solo acoustic performances by Erelli as well as covers by Shawn Colvin, Townes Van Zandt, and others. Also in 2007, Erelli toured with Lori McKenna in support of Tim McGraw and Faith Hill on their Soul 2 Soul tour which included appearances on Good Morning America and at the Grand Ole Opry. Later that year Erelli invited fans to finance his next studio album - Delivered - referring to the project as a barn raising. The project succeeded and the 11-song album produced by Josh Ritter's bassist, Zack Hickman, was released in 2008. In his review of Delivered for The Huffington Post, entertainment writer Mike Ragogna said:

"This is powerful stuff, and it's a shame that over the six or so albums Mark Erelli has created, he hasn't grown into a more popular artist. But we all know about marketing challenges and how difficult it is these days to cut through the cacophony of TMZ-style stories our mainstream media prefers. As Erelli points out, nothing much has changed here. But as he also reminds us by that song's title, "Hope Dies Last."

In 2009, Erelli was a member of Josh Ritter's band when Ritter opened shows for Ray Lamontagne in the United Kingdom. Tour dates included performances in Sheffield and the Royal Albert Hall in London.

Little Vigils - again produced by Zack Hickman - was released in 2010. The title is taken from a line in the lead-off track "August."

In the spring of 2014, Erelli announced a Kickstarter campaign to fund his Bill Morrissey tribute CD titled Milltowns. On June 26, 2014, Erelli announced that the Kickstarter campaign had exceeded his initial $20,000 goal with donations received from more than 400 supporters of the project. Milltowns was released on September 9, 2014. In her review for Folk Alley, Kim Ruehl wrote: "Milltowns doesn't come off as a covers record or a tribute album, though, so much as it does a thank-you note for the songs Morrissey put out into the world. With each performance, Erelli gives himself over to the song and seems to be simply following along and learning from where the song takes him. Backed by Sam Kassirer on piano, Charlie Rose on pedal steel and banjo, and Zack Hickman on upright bass, Erelli also welcomes backing vocals from the area's finest singers: Rose Cousins, Kris Delmhorst, Jeffrey Foucault, Anaïs Mitchell, Peter Mulvey, and Rose Polenzani."

On January 4, 2016, Erelli announced a second Kickstarter campaign in support of For A Song - his first solo album of original material in six years. One month later, Erelli announced that the project was successfully funded, having raised more than $36K from 469 backers. For A Song was released on April 8, 2016. In a review of For A Song for No Depression, Red Line Roots compared Erelli's songs to those of Paul Simon or Jackson Browne and went on to say: "For A Song reflects Erelli's incredible craftsmanship. The arrangements are tight and spare, leaving plenty of room for his voice to convey the sincerity of each song." In CD HotList's Picks of the Month, Rick Anderson wrote that "The whole album is gorgeous and at times borders on heartbreaking." The week of April 25, 2016, For A Song was #34 on the Americana Music Association chart.

== Collaborations ==
=== Barnstar! ===
Barnstar! is Erelli's bluegrass band collaboration with father and son Taylor Armerding and Jake Armerding, Charlie Rose, and Zack Hickman. The band's debut release - C'mon! - was released in 2011. The album includes several well-known songs such as Neil Young's "Cowgirl in the Sand" and the Louvin Brothers' "Cash on the Barrelhead" as well as three songs penned by Erelli.

The collaboration continued with the 2015 release of Sit Down! Get Up! Get Out!. In his review for The Boston Globe, Stuart Munro wrote that the release is "genre-bending music filled with jawdropping harmonizing, emotive ensemble playing, and a raucous immediacy."

=== Seven Curses ===
In 2010, Erelli paired up with Jeffrey Foucault to release Seven Curses: A Killer Selection of Americana Murder Ballads. Other than the closing track,"Wyoming Wind" written by Erelli, the collection of songs are covers. They include Woody Guthrie's "Philadelphia Lawyer," Bruce Springsteen's "Johnny 99," and Kevin "Blackie" Farrell's "Sonora's Death Row," to name three. "Whether sweet and mellow or raw and raucous sounding, this homicidal assortment is bleeding great!"

=== Darwin Song Project ===
Erelli was chosen to join seven other songwriters in a songwriting retreat called the Darwin Song Project, one of many events that took place in 2009 to commemorate Charles Darwin's bicentennial. The event - organized by the Shrewsbury Folk Festival - took place in Darwin's hometown of Shrewsbury, England when the group of musicians gathered to write songs that "have a resonance and relevance to the life of Darwin." The other Darwin artists are Chris Wood, Karine Polwart, Rachael McShane, Jez Lowe, Stu Hanna, Krista Detor and Emily Smith. A concert at the Theatre Severn in March 2009 was recorded and later released as a live CD, and the artists reunited in August 2009 for a performance at the Shrewsbury Folk Festival.

=== With Chuck Prophet and klipschutz ===
In 2018, Erelli visited San Francisco and over two days wrote three songs with Chuck Prophet and Prophet's longtime writing partner, the poet/songsmith klipschutz (pen name of Kurt Lipschutz). Erelli subsequently recorded and released two of those songs: "Her Town Now" (Blindsided, 2020) and "While the World Goes Mad All Around You", with Barnstar! (Furious Kindness, 2024).

== Discography ==
Studio Albums

| Year | Title | Record label |
|---|---|---|
| 2026 | Spring Green | Self-released |
| 2023 | Lay Your Darkness Down | Self-released |
| 2020 | Blindsided | Self-released |
| 2018 | Mixtape | Self-released |
| 2016 | For A Song | Self-released |
| 2015 | Sit Down! Get Up! Get Out! (with Barnstar!) | Self-released |
| 2014 | Milltowns | Hillbilly Pilgrim |
| 2011 | C’Mon! (with Barnstar!) | Self-released |
| 2010 | Little Vigils | Hillbilly Pilgrim |
| 2010 | Seven Curses (with Jeffrey Foucault) | Self-released |
| 2009 | Darwin Song Project | Shrewsbury Folk Festival Records |
| 2008 | Delivered | Signature Sounds |
| 2007 | Innocent When You Dream | Signature Sounds |
| 2006 | Hope & Other Casualties | Signature Sounds |
| 2004 | Hillbilly Pilgrim | Signature Sounds |
| 2002 | The Memorial Hall Recordings | Signature Sounds |
| 2001 | Compass & Companion | Signature Sounds |
| 1999 | Mark Erelli | Signature Sounds |
| 1997 | Long Way From Heaven | Self-released |

== Songwriting credits ==
| Year | Song | Artist/Album |
|---|---|---|
| 2014 | Pretend | Red Molly/The Red Album |
| 2014 | Tired Eyes | Rose Cousins/Stray Birds |
| 2012 | Juliet (with Antje Duvekot) | Antje Duvekot/New Siberia |
| 2011 | Why Should I Cry | Red Molly/Light in the Sky |
| 2011 | Ghost | Red Molly/Light in the Sky |
| 2009 | Vertigo (with Antje Duvekot) | Antje Duvekot/The Near Demise of the High Wire Dancer |
| 2007 | Hollow Man | Chuck E. Costa/Where The Songs Come From |
| 2006 | Passing Through (with Catie Curtis) | Catie Curtis/Long Night Moon |
| 2006 | Let's Make A Family | Camille Te Nahu/Recovered |
| 2006 | People Look Around (with Catie Curtis) | Catie Curtis/Long Night Moon |
| 2005 | My Love | Camille Te Nahu/Not Without You |
| 2003 | The Only Way | Ellis Paul and Vance Gilbert/Side of the Road |
