= Patrick McGinley =

Irish novelist (born 1937)

Patrick Anthony McGinley (born February 8, 1937) is an Irish novelist, born in Glencolumbkille, Ireland.

After teaching in Ireland, McGinley moved to England in the 1960s and settled in Kent. He pursued a career as a publisher and author.

== Bibliography ==
McGinley's novels include:

- Bogmail (1978)
- Foxprints (1982)
- Goosefoot (1983)
- Foggage (1983)
- The Trick of the Ga Bolga (1986)
- The Red Men (1987)
- The Devil's Diary (1988)
- The Lost Soldier's Song (1994)
