= Brooks Williams =

American songwriter

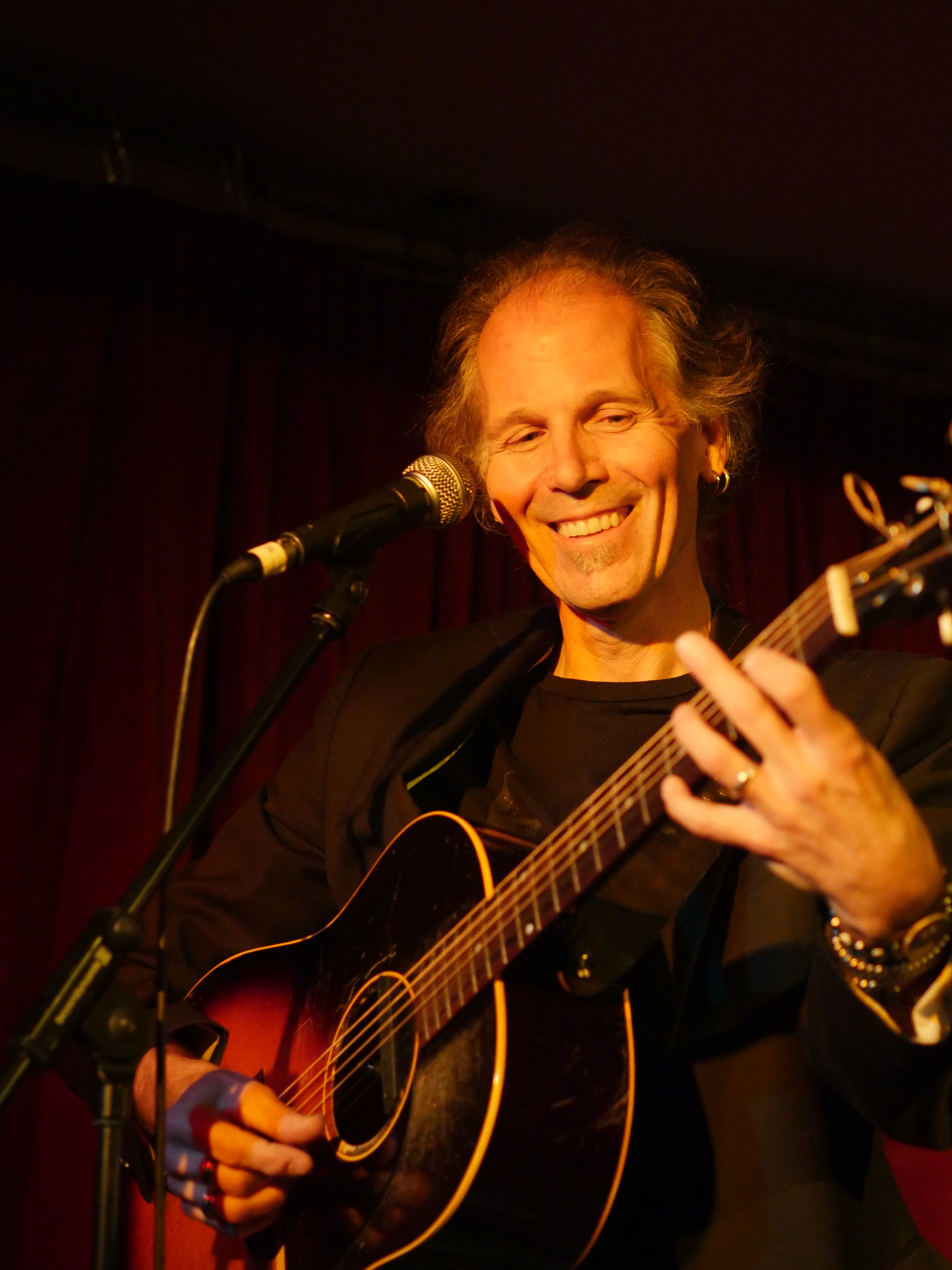
- Williams in concert, 2018

Background information
- Born: November 10, 1958 (age 67); Statesboro, Georgia, U.S.
- Genres: American folk music, classical, jazz, blues
- Occupation: Singer-songwriter
- Instrument: Acoustic guitar
- Labels: Red Guitar Blue, Green Linnet, Signature Sounds, Silent Planet, Solid Air

Brooks Williams (born November 10, 1958) is an American acoustic guitarist and singer-songwriter. His style combines roots, jazz, blues, classical, and folk. He has released albums of contemporary folk music, blues music, and of instrumental guitar music. In addition to his solo recordings and tours, he has frequently recorded and toured with many other musicians over the years, including Boo Hewerdine, Jim Henry, Guy Davis, Hans Theessink, Steve Tilston and Sloan Wainwright.

== Biography ==
Williams was born in Statesboro, Georgia, United States. In his late teens, he moved to Boston to pursue higher education and a career in music. Williams began releasing music on his own label, Red Guitar Blue Music, in 1989, with an EP called Red Guitar Plays Blue; this EP was pressed on CD with additional unreleased recordings from the late 1980s in 1993, under the same title and label. His first two "official" albums (North From Statesboro, How the Night-Time Sings) were also self-released under Red Guitar Blue Music. The albums from 1992-1997 were recorded under contract with Green Linnet Records, except for Ring Some Changes, which was released by Signature Sounds. Williams signed to Signature Sounds and released the albums listed from 1999–2003, except for Dead Sea Cafe, a compilation of Green Linnet-era recordings released by Silent Planet Records.

In 2004, Williams returned to own Red Guitar Blue Music label, and has released albums exclusively in this way to the present, apart from Guitar Player, which was released through Solid Air Records. The first two albums, plus both versions of Red Guitar Plays Blue have been out of print for many years; in 2002, Williams selected favorite tracks from the first two albums for a best-of compilation on Red Guitar Blue Music called Acoustic Beginnings 1990-1991 which is now also out of print. In May 2006, Green Linnet Records was sold to Compass Records and four of those records are now available through their website.

In recent years, Williams' music has been more heavily focused on the blues. Williams has relocated to England, and currently tours in both the UK and the US. In 2011, State of the Union, was a collaboration with the well-known British singer-songwriter Boo Hewerdine. Snake Oil captured the live energy between the two in concert.

Brooks released two albums in 2016. The first, entitled My Turn Now, featured Sally Barker on backing vocals, Richard Gates on electric bass and co-producer Chris Pepper on the drums. The second, Brooks' Blues, featured a number of Williams's favourite blues songs including Robert Johnson's "From Four Until Late", Memphis Slim's "Mother Earth", Bessie Smith's "Backwater Blues" and Blind Willie McTell's "Statesboro Blues". The album was recorded in an 'old school' manner, with just voice and guitar (acoustic, resonator and cigar box), live in the studio, using vintage microphones.

In November 2016, Brooks joined forces with Guy Davis for a UK tour entitled 'Inside The Delta', a showcase of the many varied styles of the blues.

2017 saw the release of a third 'State of the Union' album entitled The Saltwell Sessions - another joint venture with Boo Hewerdine.

In May 2018, Hans Theessink joined Brooks for an extensive tour of the UK. In July 2018, Williams released the album Lucky Star.

In February 2020, Brooks released the album Work My Claim, a celebration of his 30 years in the music business.

== Discography ==
=== Albums ===
- North from Statesboro (Red Guitar Blue, 1990)
- How the Night-time Sings (Red Guitar Blue, 1991)
- Back to Mercy (Green Linnet, 1992)
- Inland Sailor (Green Linnet, 1994)
- Knife Edge (Green Linnet, 1996)
- Ring Some Changes (Signature Sounds, 1997) (with Jim Henry)
- Seven Sisters (Signature Sounds, 1997)
- Hundred Year Shadow (Signature Sounds, 1999)
- Dead Sea Café (Silent Planet, 2000)
- Little Lion (Signature Sounds, 2000)
- Skiffle-Bop (Signature Sounds, 2001)
- Acoustic Beginnings: 1990-1991 (Red Guitar Blue, 2002)
- Nectar (Signature Sounds, 2003)
- Live/Solo (Red Guitar Blue Music, 2004)
- Guitar Player (Solid Air, 2005)
- Blues and Ballads (Red Guitar Blue, 2006)
- The Time I Spend with You (Red Guitar Blue, 2008)
- Baby-O! (Red Guitar Blue, 2010)
- New Everything (Red Guitar Blue, 2013)
- Shreveport Sessions (Red Guitar Blue, 2014)
- My Turn Now (Red Guitar Blue, 2016)
- Brooks' Blues (Red Guitar Blue, 2016)
- Lucky Star (Red Guitar Blue, 2018)
- Work My Claim (Red Guitar Blue, 2020)
- Grant Avenue Tapes (Vol. 1) ... (Limited reissue of 1995 analogue recordings on vinyl, 2021)
- Diamond Days (Red Guitar Blue, 2024)
- Brooks' Acoustic (2026)

with State of the Union

- State of the Union (Reveal, 2011) (with Boo Hewerdine)
- Snake Oil (Reveal, 2012) (with Boo Hewerdine)
- The Saltwell Sessions (2017) (with Boo Hewerdine)

with Aaron Catlow

- Ghost Owl (2021)
- Ready for the Times (2022)
- Greens and Blues (2023)
- Working in Wood (2026)

=== EPs ===
- Red Guitar Plays Blue (Red Guitar Blue, 1989)
- More New Everything (Red Guitar Blue, 2013)
- Christmas 2014 (Red Guitar Blue, 2014)

with State of the Union

- Rent (2012) (with Boo Hewerdine) - guitars, voice

=== Compilation albums ===
- Orphans of God, tribute to Mark Heard, 1996 (Track 8: 'Rise From The Ruins')
- People On The Highway - A Tribute To Bert Jansch, 2000 (Disc 2, Track 4: 'Tell Me, What Is True Love?')
- Making God Smile: An Artists' Tribute to the Songs of Beach Boy Brian Wilson, 2002 (Track 15: 'Pet Sounds')
- Cole Porter: Delovely Guitar - A Guitar Tribute To Cole Porter, 2007 (Track 12: 'You're The Top')
- A Guitar For Elvis - An Elvis Guitar Tribute, 2010 (Track 9: 'Love Me Tender' with Benjamin Verdery)

=== DVDs ===
- Guitar Groove: A Session With Brooks Williams, 2010 (Woodhall Music)
- Brooks Williams: Teaches Blues Guitar Basics, 2011 (Woodhall Music)
