= Lisa McCormick =

American singer

- Born: 1971
- Occupation: singer-songwriter

Lisa McCormick (born c.1971) is a singer-songwriter from Vermont.

== Biography ==
McCormick began playing guitar at the age of ten, and by the age of sixteen was performing in clubs. She put her music career on hold while she studied at college and then worked at the University of Vermont as an English teacher. McCormick's debut album, Right Now, was released in late 1996, containing songs which she described as "sketches of our tiny inch of history, these 1990s, with their unique spin on love and sex, science and culture and heroes."

She won the grand prize in the 1997 USA Songwriting Contest, received three preliminary Grammy nominations in 1998, and was awarded with 'Artist of the Year' and 'Album of the Year' by Maine Public Radio. In 1988, she made the decision to pursue music full-time, and after trying several types of music eventually settled on her current style as an acoustic singer-songwriter. Her career received a boost in 1994 when she performed with Jonathan Edwards, who invited her to record with him, and she was signed to his Rising Records label.

McCormick is one of the online tutors on Guitar Tricks.com, having created the foundational hub of Guitar Tricks' Core Learning System, with her new versions of Guitar Fundamentals, Levels 1 and 2.

== Discography ==
- Right Now (1996), Ladyslipper
- Seven Solos (1998)
- Sacred (1999), Orchard
- Mystery Girl (2003), Ruthie's Noise
- Talisman Groove (2007), Ruthie's Noise
