= The Verdant Mile =

EP by Tracy Grammer
- Released: 2004
- Genres: Folk; Singer-songwriter
- Length: mm:ss
- Label: Tracy Grammer Music

Tracy Grammer chronology
Drum Hat Buddha (2001)	The Verdant Mile (2004)	Flower of Avalon (2005)

Professional ratings
Review scores
Source	Rating
Kevin McCarthy	(favorable) link
Music Matters	(favorable) link
Paste	(preview) link
Rambles	(favorable) link
Sing Out!	(favorable)

The Verdant Mile is a 2004 extended play album by American folk singer Tracy Grammer.

== Track listing ==
1. "The Verdant Mile" (Grammer)
2. "This Dirty Little Town" (Kane)
3. "Wasn't Born To Follow" (Goffin, King)
4. "Solitary Man" (Diamond)
5. "When I Reach The Place I'm Goin'" (Gordy, Henry)
6. "Jackson's Tune/Trickster Tale/St. Anne's Reel" (Grammer/unknown/traditional)
7. "Old Paint" (traditional)
