= Les Sampou =

American singer-songwriter

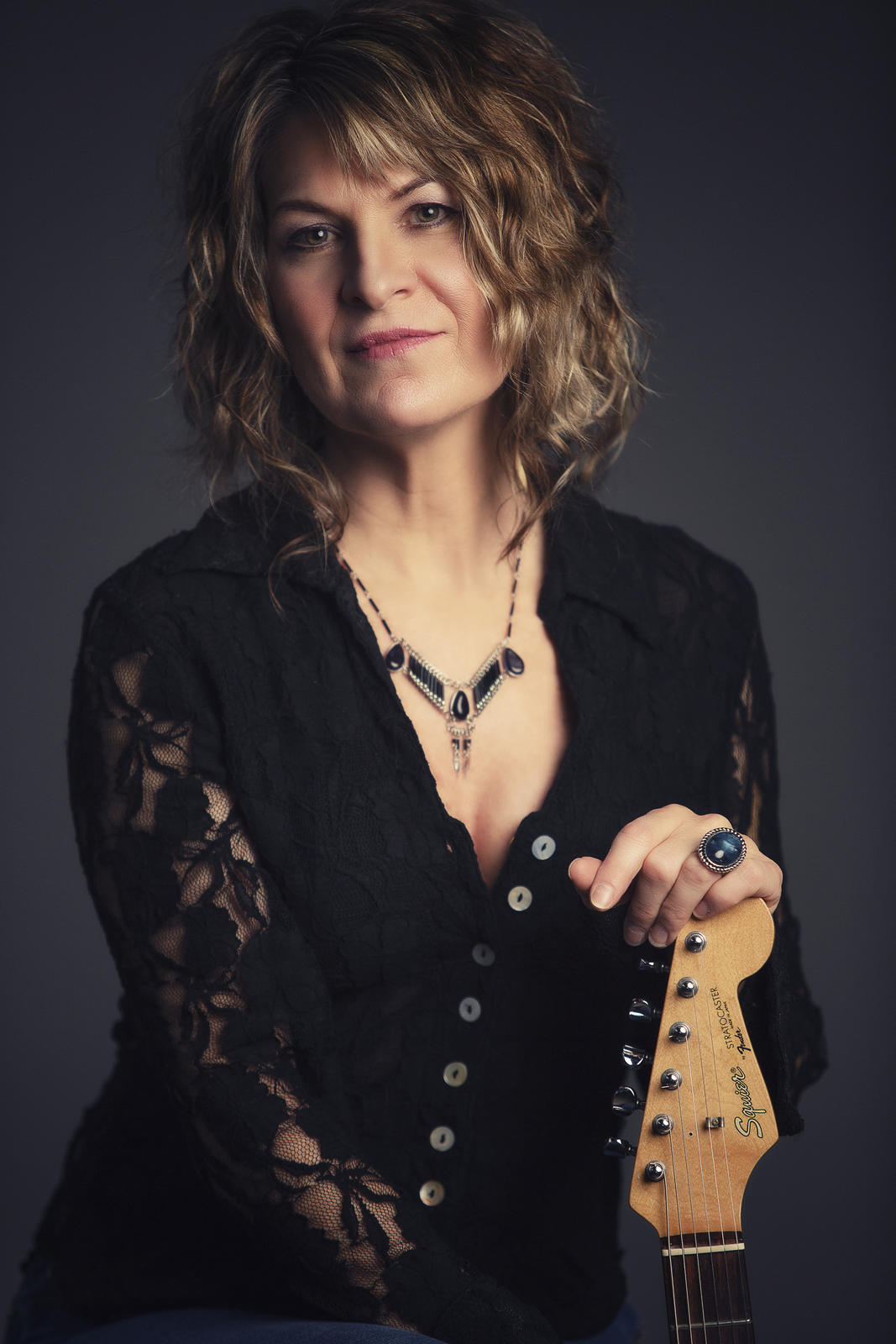

Background information
- Born: November 4, 1961 (age 64); Norwalk, Connecticut, United States
- Genres: Folk, blues, rock
- Occupations: Singer-songwriter, record producer, composer
- Instruments: Vocals, guitar
- Years active: 1993–present
- Label: Rounder Records
- Website: www.lessampoumusic.com

Les Sampou (born November 4, 1961) is an American singer-songwriter and recording artist. She was born in Norwalk, Connecticut, United States. Sampou has toured nationally since the 1990s, performing at stages such as the Montreal Jazz Festival, the Philadelphia Folk Festival, and the Toronto Blues Festival. She has recorded six albums for Rounder Records and as an indie artist. Sampou is known for her "diverse song styles, smart lyrics, and hook-laden melodies." (The Boston Globe)

Sampou's Borrowed & Blue album recorded in 2001, is a collection of country blues classics recorded live by songwriter JP Jones, featuring Sampou on guitar and vocals. It received critical acclaim from critics like Roberta Schwartz of the Peterborough Folk Music Society, who highlighted how the album showcased blues can be reached to a younger audience.

In 2010, Sampou released an Americana-themed recording called Lonesomeville, charting at number two in the radio FAR Charts, accompanied by a series of concert shows in traditional folk venues, such as Passim, in Cambridge, Massachusetts, and additional Boston area venues in cooperation with local musicians Taylor Amerding, Mark Cunningham, Andy Plaisted, Kevin Barry, Mike Dinallo and Jimmy Ryan.

In 2015, Sampou wrote for television and film projects, and toured in New England. She released her sixth album, Live at Church, a dedication album to the national coffeehouse circuit of volunteers and promoters who present on church stages.

== Discography ==
- Sweet Perfume (1993)
- Fall From Grace (1996)
- Les Sampou (1999)
- Borrowed & Blue (2001)
- Lonesomeville (2010)
- Live at Church (2015)
- Best Day Of The Year (2024)
