= Erica Wheeler (singer-songwriter) =

American folk singer-songwriter

- Born: October 24; Maryland, U.S.
- Occupation: Singer-songwriter

Erica Wheeler (born October 24) is an American folk singer-songwriter. She lives in western Massachusetts. Growing up in the suburbs of Washington, D.C., she was exposed to traditional folk and bluegrass music in surrounding Virginia, West Virginia, and Maryland, which influenced her later style. She attended Hampshire College in Amherst, Massachusetts. Her songs such as "Rivers", "Spirit Lake", and "Maryland Country Road" draw on the natural beauty of the surroundings where she has lived.

Erica also offers workshops and recordings which are intended to foster the emotional connection between people and place.

In March 2008 she released "Good Summer Rain" which fuses the roots Americana sounds of dobro, mandolin, guitar, and drums with the piano and upright bass. This album is sponsored by The Trust for Public Land.

== Discography ==
- From That Far (1992)
- The Harvest (1996)
- Three Wishes (1999)
- Wonderland (2000)
- Almost Like Tonight (live) (2005)
- Good Summer Rain (2008)
