= Louise Taylor (singer) =

American singer

Louise Taylor is an American folk singer-songwriter from Brattleboro, Vermont. An older brother gave her a guitar when she was twelve and at age 15 she left home, hitchhiking and busking her way around the United States. She started writing and performing her own songs, playing on street corners or wherever she could and eventually settled in Texas, near the Gulf of Mexico, at the age of 20. Her song "Blue Norther" chronicled her experiences working as a waitress in a cantina there, and her encounters with the local fishermen.

Taylor continued hitchhiking around the United States for two more years before returning to Vermont where she eventually started studying voice at Bennington College with voice teacher, Frank Baker. In 1992, she released her first album, Looking for Rivers, a collection of ten originals with a folk and blues slant. Her songs appeared on several Fast Folk releases between 1993 and 1997.

Taylor's sophomore release, Ruby Shoes, was produced by Will Ackerman, founder of the Windham Hill label, and in 1997 Signature Sounds released her third album, Ride. Her release, Velvet Town, was co-produced with friend Annie Gallup in 2003.

Her district rhythmic style was developed while busking on the streets. Taylor credits Ray Bonneville and Chris Smither for helping her to expand her fingerpicking style.

Her new album, Tangerine, produced by Peter Gallway and Annie Gallup, was released in May 2012.

== Discography ==
- Looking for Rivers (Blue Coyote Records, 1992)
- Ruby Shoes (Signature Sounds, 1996)
- Ride (Signature Sounds, 1997)
- Written in Red (Signature Sounds, 2000)
- Velvet Town (Signature Sounds, 2003)
- Tangerine (Signature Sounds, 2012)
