= Signature Sounds Recordings =

Independent record label specializing in Americana & modern folk musici

- Founded: 1995
- Founder: Jim Olsen, Mark Thayer
- Distributor: Redeye Distribution (World)
- Genre: Americana, folk
- Country of origin: U.S.
- Location: Northampton, Massachusetts
- Official website: www.signaturesounds.com

Signature Sounds Recordings is an independent record label specializing in Americana and modern folk music. Jim Olsen and Mark Thayer founded the label in 1995 to promote acoustic musicians who were playing in Northampton, Massachusetts.

Signature recorded Josh Ritter, Erin McKeown, Mary Gauthier, and Lori McKenna. The label's albums are distributed worldwide by Redeye Distribution.

== History ==
Thayer established the Signature Sounds Recording Studio in 1982 and created the label with Olsen in 1995. The studio in Pomfret, Connecticut has recorded folk and jazz musicians, including many Signature Sounds recordings. The label's main office moved in 2012 from its original location in Whately, Massachusetts to a more prominent site in downtown Northampton. The new offices include an intimate music venue, called The Parlor Room, in which concerts are held regularly.

== Roster ==
- And The Kids
- Rani Arbo and Daisy Mayhem
- Taylor Ashton
- Birds of Chicago
- Dave Carter and Tracy Grammer
- Daisy Castro
- The Dustbowl Revival
- Crooked Still
- Kris Delmhorst
- Fred Eaglesmith
- Mark Erelli
- Jeffrey Foucault
- Mary Gauthier
- Mark Geary
- Tracy Grammer
- Jim Henry
- Caroline Herring
- Eilen Jewell
- Joy Kills Sorrow
- Bridget Kearney
- Knots and Crosses
- Lake Street Dive
- Patty Larkin
- Peter Lehndorff
- Laurie Lewis & Tom Rozum
- Heather Maloney
- The Mammals
- Lori McKenna
- Erin McKeown
- Peter Mulvey
- Pete Nelson
- Parsonsfield
- Deb Pasternak
- Philip Price
- Redbird
- Amy Rigby
- Josh Ritter
- Salamander Crossing
- Maria Sangiolo
- Richard Shindell
- Chris Smither
- The Sweetback Sisters
- Louise Taylor
- Twisted Pine
- Viva Quetzal
- Erica Wheeler
- Brooks Williams
- Winterpills

== See also ==
- List of record labels
