= Tracy Grammer =

American folk singer

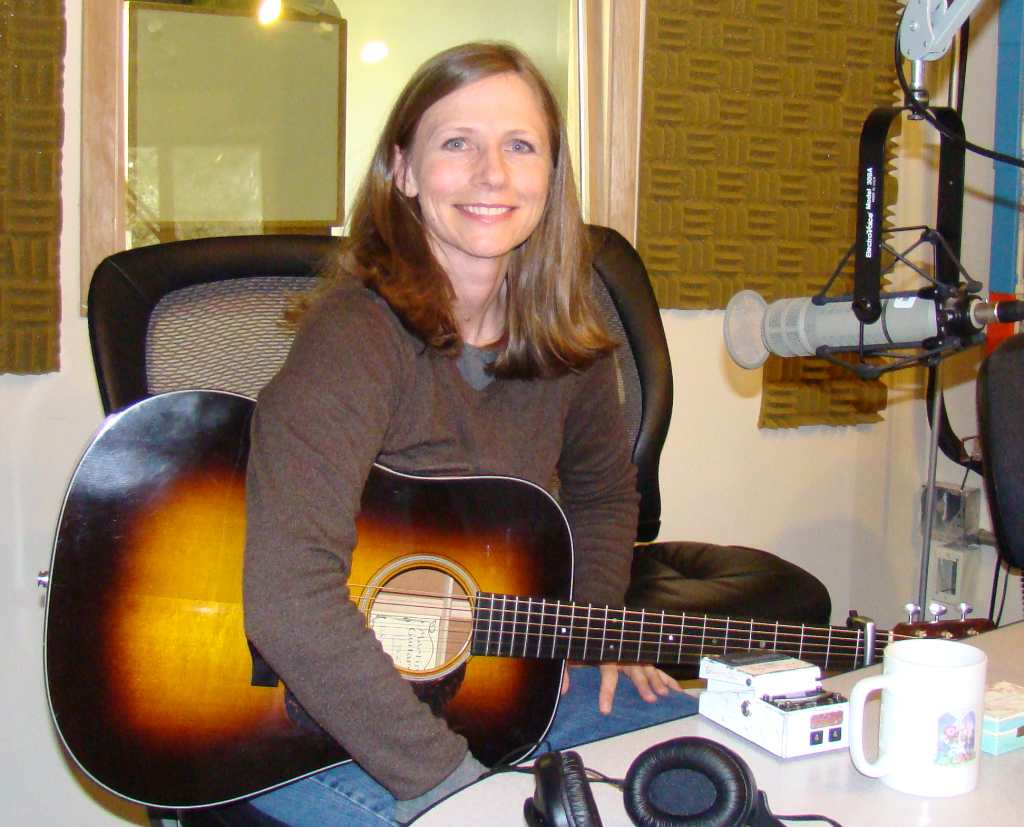
- Tracy Grammer at KBCS radio, 2008

Background information
- Birth name: Teresa Marie Grammer
- Born: April 8, 1968 (age 56); Homestead, Florida, U.S.
- Genres: Folk
- Occupation: Folk singer
- Instrument(s): Violin, Guitar, Mandolin, Vocals
- Years active: 1998–present
- Labels: Tracy Grammer Music, Signature Sounds, Red House Records
- Website: TracyGrammer.com

Tracy Grammer (born April 8, 1968) is an American folk singer known for her work as half of the folk duo Dave Carter and Tracy Grammer and for the solo career that she has continued since Carter's death. She released three albums with Dave Carter during his lifetime, at first doing instrumental work and providing backing vocals, and then, by their last album together, singing lead vocals on half of the tracks. Four albums by the duo have been released since Carter's death. She has also released four solo recordings, some of which have included previously unreleased songs by Carter, as well as four songbooks.

== Biography ==
Born in Homestead, Florida, Tracy Grammer was raised in Southern California and began her musical career on a borrowed violin at the age of 9. She came from a musical family. Her father, Jim Grammer, played acoustic, electric, and lap steel guitars. Distant relation Leo Fortin played violin and was best known for playing double trumpets in Lawrence Welk's orchestra. She earned a bachelor's degree in English literature from the University of California, Berkeley.

Following Dave Carter's death in 2002, Grammer made the decision to play solo at several of the dates that they had scheduled, most notably an engagement at the Falcon Ridge Folk Festival. Taking into account Carter's expressed wish that eventually she would sing all of the songs, she continued playing Carter's music. She has continued to tour solo and has released four solo albums. The first, The Verdant Mile, is an EP containing her first original composition, the title track, a eulogy for Carter.

Her second solo release, Flower of Avalon, consists of ten tracks, nine of which were written by Carter before his death, and one of which is a traditional folk song arranged by William Jolliff. The album was co-produced by Grammer and John Jennings. Featured artists include Mary Chapin Carpenter, who provided many backing vocals, and Jim Henry, Grammer's touring partner and Signature Sounds label mate.

Her third album, Book of Sparrows, was released in November, 2007 and is a seven-song EP featuring covers of songs by Tom Russell, Kate Power, David Francey, Dave Carter, and Paul Simon. The EP was co-produced by Grammer and Jim Henry.

In 2005, her company, Tracy Grammer Music, made arrangements with Elise Fischer, Carter's sister and copyright owner, to administer the catalog of Dave Carter, giving her effective control over the duo's music.

In addition to touring, Grammer was choral conductor at the Academy at Charlemont from 2010 until 2012. She released an album on Red House Records in February 2012, Little Blue Egg, which contained 11 previously-unheard duo recordings that had been recovered from the Dave Carter and Tracy Grammer archives. Later that year, she and Red House released Joy My Love, a limited-edition EP containing five more of the duo's archived recordings.

In January 2014, Tracy Grammer joined 21 other female singer-songwriters in a project called "RealWomenRealSongs." The project required each participant to write and upload one song per week for 52 weeks to the RealWomenRealSongs YouTube channel. Several of the songs written during that project appear on Grammer's fourth solo recording and first songwriter release, Low Tide (Tracy Grammer Music, 2018). Low Tide was funded entirely by a Kickstarter campaign that reached its goal in just 34 hours and engaged more than 700 fans.

In 2016, Grammer debuted a new presentation called "words+music" that weaves readings from her memoir-in-progress with songs and musical excerpts on violin and guitar. words+music is an occasional show focusing on Grammer's life with Dave Carter, including the effect of Carter's gender transition on the duo's life and work together, and Grammer's path back to the stage after Carter's death.

== Discography ==
=== Solo recordings ===
Title	Release date	Label
The Verdant Mile (EP)	2004	Tracy Grammer Music
Flower of Avalon	2005; 2019	Signature Sounds; Tracy Grammer Music
Book of Sparrows (EP)	2007	Tracy Grammer Music
Low Tide	2018	Tracy Grammer Music
If I Needed You (single)	2020	Tracy Grammer Music
I'll Be Here in the Morning (single)	2020	Tracy Grammer Music

=== Dave Carter & Tracy Grammer ===
Title	Release date	Label
When I Go	1998; 2001; 2013	Self-release; Signature Sounds; Tracy Grammer Music
Tanglewood Tree	2000	Signature Sounds
Drum Hat Buddha	2001	Signature Sounds
Seven Is the Number	2006	Tracy Grammer Music
American Noel (EP)	2007; 2008	Tracy Grammer Music; Signature Sounds
Little Blue Egg	2012; 2017	Red House Records; Tracy Grammer Music
Joy My Love	2012; 2017	Red House Records; Tracy Grammer Music
