= Vance Gilbert =

American songwriter

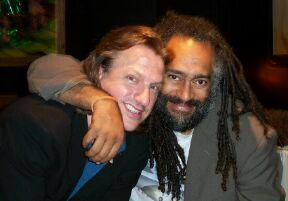
Vance (right) with musician Ellis Paul in Houston, Texas

Vance Gilbert (born in Philadelphia, Pennsylvania, United States; on October 11, 1958) is an American folk singer-songwriter. He started as a jazz singer, switched to folk music, became a regular on the open mike circuit in Boston and toured with Shawn Colvin. He has recorded sixteen albums, including Side of the Road, three of them on Philo/Rounder Records.

Raised in Willingboro Township, New Jersey, Gilbert graduated from Connecticut College.

Gilbert has a wide range, covering Joni Mitchell one moment and doing a jazz classic (but is actually his own) the next. Many songs, such as "Old White Men", "Charlene", and "Unfamiliar Moon" tell stories and touch on important topics. Many of his other tunes, such as "Goodbye Pluto" and "Waiting For Gilligan" take familiar stories from contemporary headlines and from popular culture and approach them in a whimsical way.

== Discography ==
- Here I'm Waiting (1985)
- Face to Face (1989)
- Edgewise (1994)
- Fugitives (1995)
- Shaking Off Gravity (1998)
- Somerville Live (2000)
- One Thru Fourteen (2002)
- Side of the Road (with Ellis Paul) (2003)
- Unfamiliar Moon (2005)
- Angels, Castles, Covers (2006)
- Up On Rockfield (2008)
- Old White Men (2011)
- BaD Dog Buffet (2014)
- Nearness of You (2015)
- Good Good Man (2020)
- Mother of Trouble (2023)
