= Jim Henry (musician) =

American singer-songwriter

Jim Henry is an American folk singer-songwriter and multi-instrumentalist. He started out as a member of the Sundogs, a New England "swamp-boogie-swing" band, in the late 1980s. In 1993, he released his first solo album, Into the Blue. He has toured with Mark Erelli, Deb Talan, and The Burns Sisters, and has added instrumental parts to hundreds of albums. He toured for many years with Tracy Grammer and his accompaniment has appeared on both her solo albums. The two met for the first time at their first gig, unrehearsed. He is also a music producer and sound engineer.

== Discography ==
- Into the Blue (1993)
- Jacksonville (1995, out of print, available as a download)
- Ring Some Changes (with Brooks Williams) (1997)
- The Wayback (1999)
- One-Horse Town (2005)
- King of Hearts (2008)
