= Rani Arbo and Daisy Mayhem =

American Musical Group

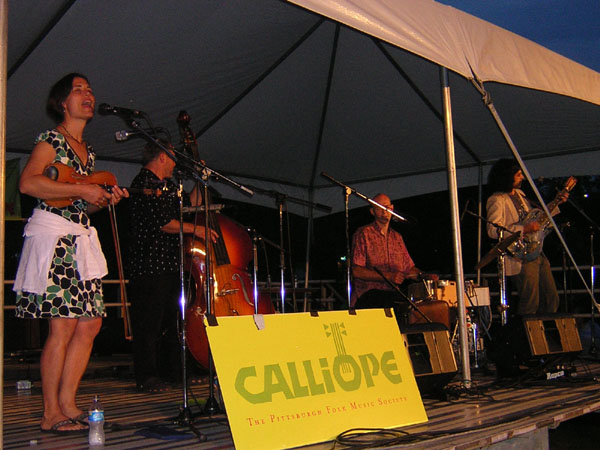
- Rani Arbo and Daisy Mayhem performing on July 12, 2008.

Background information
- Origin: New England, United States
- Genres: Folk, country blues, progressive bluegrass, Western swing, jug band, jazz, and swing
- Years active: 1999–Present
- Label: Signature Sounds Recordings
- Members: Rani Arbo; Andrew Kinsey; Anand Nayak; Scott Kessel

Rani Arbo and the band Daisy Mayhem, consisting of Andrew Kinsey, Anand Nayak, and Scott Kessel, are an American musical group whose style combines folk, country blues, progressive bluegrass, jazz, and swing. Arbo and Kinsey were formerly members of Salamander Crossing.

== Discography ==
- Cocktail Swing (2001)
- Gambling Eden (2003)
- Big Old Life (2007)
- Ranky Tanky (2010)
- Some Bright Morning (2012)
- Violets Are Blue (2015)
- Wintersong (2016)
