= Pat Wictor =

American singer-songwriter (born 1966)

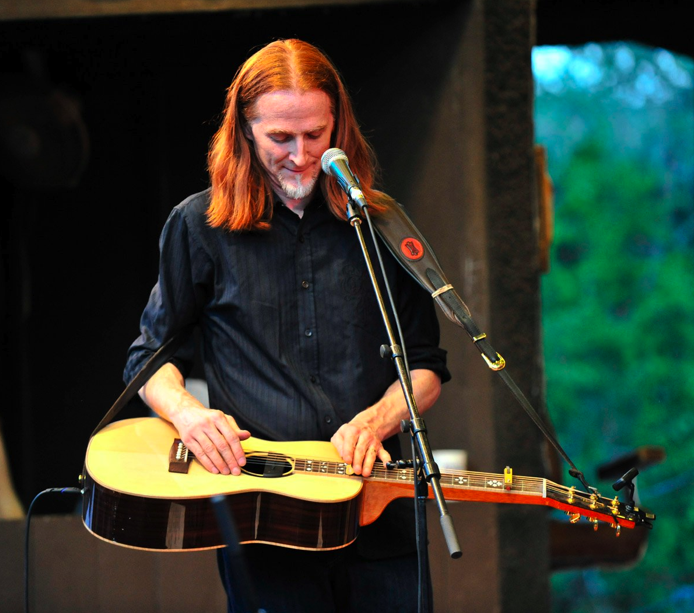
- Wictor in 2014

Background information
- Born: 1966 (age 59–60)
- Origin: Caripito, Monagas, Venezuela
- Genres: Blues, folk, Americana
- Occupations: Musician, singer-songwriter, recording artist, educator
- Instruments: Acoustic guitar, vocals, dobro, lap slide guitar
- Years active: 1995–present
- Labels: RiskyDisc, Brother Sun Music
- Website: PatWictor.com

Pat Wictor (born 1966, Caripito, Venezuela) is an American blues and folk musician, guitarist, singer-songwriter, and recording artist. Known for his ethereal style, he was nominated for Emerging Artist of the Year in 2006 by the Folk Alliance, and has released a number of solo albums. In 2010 Wictor co-founded the folk trio Brother Sun, with singer-songwriters Joe Jencks and Greg Greenway, and the band has since released two full albums and toured extensively. Wictor also has an extensive discography as a sideman, playing instruments such as lap slide guitar and dobro. He currently resides in Brooklyn, New York.

== Early life ==
Pat Wictor was born in 1966 in Caripito, a city in the Monagas State of Venezuela. Both his parents were American, and early on his mother, Cecilia "Cee Cee" Lower Wictor, exposed Wictor to history, poetry and the arts. For several years Wictor and his four older siblings lived in oil camps owned by Creole Petroleum Corporation, and their father's career in the oil industry later led to them living in East Texas, the Netherlands, Norway, and England. Wictor returned to the United States as a teenager, living first in California.

Wictor began playing guitar while young, and focused on genres as diverse as rock, heavy metal, and jazz. After starting with guitar he also learned bass and saxophone. He quit music entirely in the late 1980s to become a community organizer, then a high school teacher.

== Music career ==
=== Tall Tales ===
In 1993 Wictor returned to music, and around that time also began composing songs. He initially played solo; however, he soon met fellow guitarist Jim Ypsilantis while both were living in New York City and working as teachers, and they began composing music together and performing live in the area under the band name Tall Tales.

On January 5, 1999, they released their first album, Souls Are Falling. According to a review, the album contains "creative 'new acoustic' sounds (i.e., elements of folk, rock, jazz, and soul). Touches of world music – African, Latin, Middle Eastern – can be heard throughout their work, distinguishing it from the pack of other current adult contemporary music. The band's focus and strength lies not in its vocals, but in the sound of Wictor's and Ypsilantis's guitars blending together, weaving in and out, dancing about like Fred Astaire and Ginger Rogers."

Wictor and Ypsilantis released a second album on October 4, 2001, titled Things You Know. That year, Wictor left teaching to become a full-time musician. In 2002, he performed on the first of many recordings as a sideman, and he began to develop a reputation for his skill with lap slide guitar.

=== Solo albums ===
On March 23, 2003, Wictor released his debut solo album Temporary Stay on his own independent label RiskyDisc Records. This was followed by the album Waiting for the Water, also released on RiskyDisc on September 23, 2004. Waiting for the Water reached No. 4 on the Folk-DJ Charts, and Wictor toured throughout the United States. In 2005 and 2006, his touring included opening sets for artists such as Richie Havens, Chris Smither, and John Hammond.

Heaven is So High (2006)

Wictor's third album, Heaven Is So High...And I'm So Far Down, was released in July 2006 on RiskyDisc. The CD featured original songs mixed with distinctively arranged covers of artists such as Mississippi Fred McDowell, Rev. Gary Davis, Bob Dylan, Walter Davis, and Dave Carter. Wictor also handled guitar and lap slide guitar, with bass by Freebo and blues harmonica by Bob Beach.

Like his previous album, it peaked at No. 4 on the Folk-DJ Charts, In a 2007 review for Heaven Is So High by Acoustic Music, Wictor was described as "a monster lap steel, resonator guitar and dobro player...He plays blues and folk like he was born to them." The review also praised both his original songs and his adaptations of older songs.

In 2006, Wictor was nominated for the Emerging Artist of the Year Award by Folk Alliance International. The following year, he was a finalist at the New Folk songwriting contest at the Kerrville Folk Festival in Texas. He has also been named "Most Wanted" at the Falcon Ridge Emerging Artist Showcase, and was a nominee for Best Gospel Song with his track "Love Is the Water" at the Independent Music Awards.

Sunset Waltz (2008)

His next album, Sunset Waltz, was released on RiskyDisc in May 2008 on both CD and digital format. As with his previous solo albums, Wictor wrote, arranged, sang, and performed all of the guitars, and for the first time also produced the recording himself.

The album includes a rework of his song "Where Did You Go?," originally on Waiting for Water. This time on the track, he was joined by Red Molly, a band from New York then consisting of Abbie Gardner, Laurie MacAllister and Carolann Sollebello. Songs like "Eventide" feature Wictor on laptop steel guitar, with vocal harmony from the duo of Joe Jencks and Helena Nash, and accompaniment from Jon Carroll on organ, Cheryl Prashker on drums, and Don Porterfield on bass. He also recorded songs by Phil Ochs for the album, though he significantly re-arranged the tracks.

Sunset Waltz reached No. 2 on the Folk-DJ charts.

Living Ever-Lovin' LIVE (2010)

His solo album, Living Ever-Lovin' LIVE, is a live album with both Wictor's original tracks and a number of re-arrangements of traditional songs. The CD features several duets with dobro player and vocalist Abbie Gardner.

This is Absolutely Real: Visions and Versions of Phil Ochs

This is Absolutely Real: Visions and Versions of Phil Ochs, reached #2 on the Folk-DJ charts and was nominated for Best Tribute Album by the Independent Music Awards.

FLARE (2022)

Wictor’s latest recording, FLARE, was called “brilliant” by WFUV’s John Platt, and reached #1 on the Folk-DJ charts in last fall.

=== Collaborations, teaching ===
A capable improviser and instrumentalist, Wictor has worked as a sideman and session musician since 2002. He has contributed slide guitar and vocals to a number of releases, including ones by Sloan Wainwright, Joe Crookston, Jon Vezner, Tom Prasada-Rao, and Buskin & Batteau. He has written a number of covers and tributes for Dave Carter. Wictor is also a frequent music educator, giving workshops on music history, songwriting, improvisation, and guitar and slide guitar techniques.

=== Brother Sun ===
==== Founding ====
In late 2009, Wictor joined long-time collaborators Joe Jencks and Greg Greenway to form the band, Brother Sun. The trio had first performed together at a music conference at the Southeast Unitarian Universalist Summer Institute that summer. According to Wictor, "I invited Joe and Greg to join me onstage in a concert I was doing [at SUUSI]. We rehearsed for an hour, got onstage, and the sound of our voices together was one of the most powerful musical experiences of my life. Lots of audience members and musicians in attendance said we should form a group." However, since the members all had conflicting schedules and lived in different cities (Boston, New York, and Chicago), the band didn't coalesce until the spring of 2010, starting its first tour that December with the members traveling separately to shows.

Each member of the band plays guitar and sings, with Wictor also playing slide guitar, Greenway on piano and ukulele, and Jencks on the bouzouki, a mandolin-like instrument. Instruments such as ukulele are also used. Most of the band's songs are written by individual members, then arranged as a group, with the style typically incorporating folk, blues, and gospel. According to Wictor, "Suffering and transcendence are what the blues and gospel both have. That speaks to all three of us and what we want to project with our music." The trio's music also incorporates elements of Americana, pop, jazz, Celtic, rock, and a cappella singing.

==== Brother Sun (2011) ====
The band's debut, Brother Sun, was released on June 18, 2011. The album was recorded with the same setup as one of their live shows, with no extra instruments or voices. After debuting at No. 2 on the Folk DJ Chart, it was named the No. 8 album of 2011 on FOLK-DJ. Over a dozen radio stations, including WUMB (Boston), WFUV (NYC), and WFMT's The Midnight Special (Chicago), put the band on their "Best of 2011" and "Best of 2012" lists.

==== Some Part of the Truth (2013) ====
The majority of Wictor's touring time in 2011 and 2012 was spent with Brother Sun. Their second album, Some Part of the Truth, was released on January 26, 2013, on their new label Brother Sun Music. The album was more heavily produced than their previous release, and brought on Grammy-winning producer Ben Wisch. Bassist Zev Katz, percussionist Joe Bonadio, and cellist Brian Sanders also contributed to the recording sessions. According to Wictor, "I see this new album as more atmospheric, textural, colorful, moody, evocative, and emotionally rich [than the debut]." The album was positively received. According to Rich Warren of Chicago station WFMT, "More polished than Brother Sun's initial effort, Some Part of Truth blends expressively riveting male harmonies with precise, equally sensitive guitar and keyboard talent into three personal journeys from deep within."

Some Part of the Truth was the No. 1 CD on the Folk-DJ chart for all of 2013, receiving the most play of any release, and "Lady of the Harbor" was the No. 1 song of the year. The CD debuted at No. 1 and remained there for two months, then spent another five consecutive months in the chart's Top-40. It also reached No. 2 on SiriusXM’s Americana Chart. The first track on the CD, "Lady of the Harbor," debuted at No. 1 on the Folk-DJ Chart, and in early 2014 was also included on the in-flight program for Lufthansa Airlines.

=== Recent years ===
As of 2014, Wictor continues to tour both on his own and with members of Brother Sun, and he has performed at festivals such as the Falcon Ridge Folk Festival, the Kerrville Folk Festival, and the Philadelphia Folk Festival.

== Style ==
"He manages to creatively absorb the work of others, leaving their musical intentions beautifully intact, while adding his own sonic signature to the mix."
— Ellen Geisel, Dirty Linen

Wictor typically incorporates rural country music, gospel, and blues into his songwriting, instrumentals, and vocals. His style has also been classified as Americana, with Dirty Linen stating that the clear quality of his voice makes for an "interesting juxtaposition" alongside his musicianship.

About his songwriting style, The Country Blues wrote, "He manages to infuse an almost playful, yet tasteful, improvisation while maintaining a beautiful sense of melody." The review also praised his skill with fingerstyle and lap steel guitar," positively comparing him to Harry Manx and Kelly Joe Phelps. Also, "Wictorʼs signature sound is clean and understated, not a note too many. He annunciates each note and plays with a simple, eloquent feeling and advanced virtuosity. His music is, if anything, tinged with a sweet-sensitivity, a gentleness. This is the antonym to fiery, angry, furious blues."

== Personal life ==
As of 2014, Wictor resides in Brooklyn, New York. He continues to write a monthly email column entitled "A Few Choice Words." He is also a co-founder and board member of The Reading Odyssey, an organization dedicated to helping adults "re-ignite their curiosity and learning, mostly through exploring classic literature together."

== Discography ==
=== Solo albums ===
List of studio and live albums by Pat Wictor
Year	Album title	Release details
2003	Temporary Stay	Released: March 23, 2003; Label: RiskyDisc Records; Format: CD
2004	Waiting for the Water	Released: September 23, 2004; Label: RiskyDisc; Format: CD
2006	Heaven Is So High... And I'm So Far Down	Released: July 5, 2006; Label: RiskyDisc; Format: CD
2008	Sunset Waltz	Released: May 2, 2008; Label: RiskyDisc; Format: CD, digital
2010	Living Ever-Lovin' Live	Released: December 9, 2009; Label: RiskyDisc; Format: CD, digital
2017	This Is Absolutely Real: Visions and Versions of Phil Ochs	Released: 2017; Label: RiskyDisc; Format: CD, digital

=== Collaborations ===
List of collaborative albums with Pat Wictor as co-leader
Year	Album title	Release details
1999	Souls Are Falling by Tall Tales (Wictor and Jim Ypsilantis)	Released: January 5, 1999; Label: independent; Format: CD
2001	Things You Know by Wictor and Jim Ypsilantis	Released: October 4, 2001; Label: CD Baby; Format: CD
2011	Brother Sun by Brother Sun	Released: June 18, 2011; Label: CD Baby; Format: CD, digital
2013	Some Part of the Truth by Brother Sun	Released: January 26, 2013; Label: Brother Sun Music; Format: CD, digital

=== Writing credits ===
List of tracks written or co-written by Pat Wictor
Year	Song title	Performer(s)	Album	Role
2006	"For You" (spoken word piece set to "Where Did You Go?")	Chris Chandler, David Roe	American Storyteller Volumes 3&4	co-written with Chris Chandler
2006	"Look for the Light"	Erik Balkey	Mission Street Project: Liberty Tree	co-written with Erik Balkey
2008	"Make Levees"	PW	Mission Street Project: Make Levees	co-written with Erik Balkey
2008	"When the War is Won"	Laurie MacAllister, Amy Speace	Mission Street Project: Make Levees	co-written with Erik Balkey
2011	"Walkin' Cane"	Abbie Gardner	Hope	co-written with Gardner

=== As sideman ===
Albums with Pat Wictor as sideman
Yr	Album title	Artist(s)
2002	Find Me	Anne Mironchik
2006	Been There Too	Marc Raphael
2006	American Storyteller Volumes 3&4	Chris Chandler and David Roe
2006	Get on Board!	Kim and Reggie Harris
2006	Honey on My Grave	Abbie Gardner
2006	Roadside Saints	Zoe Mulford
2006	Shake the Stars	Sharon Goldman
2007	Blackberry Time	Jud Caswell
2007	Wilderness Plots	Tim Grimm, Carrie Newcomer, Krista Detor, Michael White, Tom Roznowski
2007	The Candle and the Flame	Joe Jencks
2007	Little Known Secret	Todd Giudice
2007	North of New York	Charlotte Kendrick
2008	Holding Up the World	Tim Grimm
2008	Standing on the Side of Love	Greg Greenway
2008	Something Worth Standing For	Andrew McKnight
2008	Able Baker Charlie and Dog	Joe Crookston
2008	Mara's Gems	Mara Levine
2008	Back in the Day	Mel White and Various Artists
2008	Painting a Moving Train	Helena Nash and Greg Greer
2008	A Song For Every Station	Michael Berkowitz
2008	Cold, Cold Year	Amy Laber
2008	Whatcha Gonna Do?	Spook Handy
2009	Links in a Chain	Joe Jencks
2009	Tomboy Princess	Meg Braun
2009	W. 11th	Sonya Heller
2010	Sleepless Lullaby	Sharon Goldman
2010	Bleecker Street Roots	Luanne Surace
2010	Cookin' in the Kitchen	Anne Mironchik
2010	Chalkboard	Amanda Penecale
2010	Hundred Shades of Blue	T.M. Hanna
2011	End of the Beginning	John Flynn
2011	Upside Down & Under My Heart	Sloan Wainwright
2011	Unbroken	Lipbone Redding
2011	Darkling & the Bluebird Jubilee	Joe Crookston
2011	Catz of the Coliseum	Jon Vezner
2011	Wilderness Songs and Bad Man Ballads	Tim Grimm
2011	Broken Places	Meg Braun
2011	Every Mile is a Memory	Friction Farm
2011	Ride the Sky	Annie Wenz
2011	Seeds	Fred Arcoleo
2012	Adagio	Tom Prasada-Rao
2012	Love Remembered, Love Forgot	Buskin and Batteau
2013	Steel and Salt	Carolann Solebello
2013	I Read Your Book	Friction Farm
2013	Coyote Wings	Zoe Mulford

=== Covers ===
The following tracks are covers of Wictor's songs.

- 2008: "Love is the Water," recorded by Robert Mattson for Amazingly Live
- 2012: "Love Is the Water," recorded by Leslie Lee and Steve Gretz for Whole Other World
- 2013: "Love Is the Water," recorded by The BrotherSisters for You Can't Be Lost
