= Kerrville Folk Festival =

Folk music festival in Texas

Coordinates: 29°57′29.2″N 99°13′01.0″W

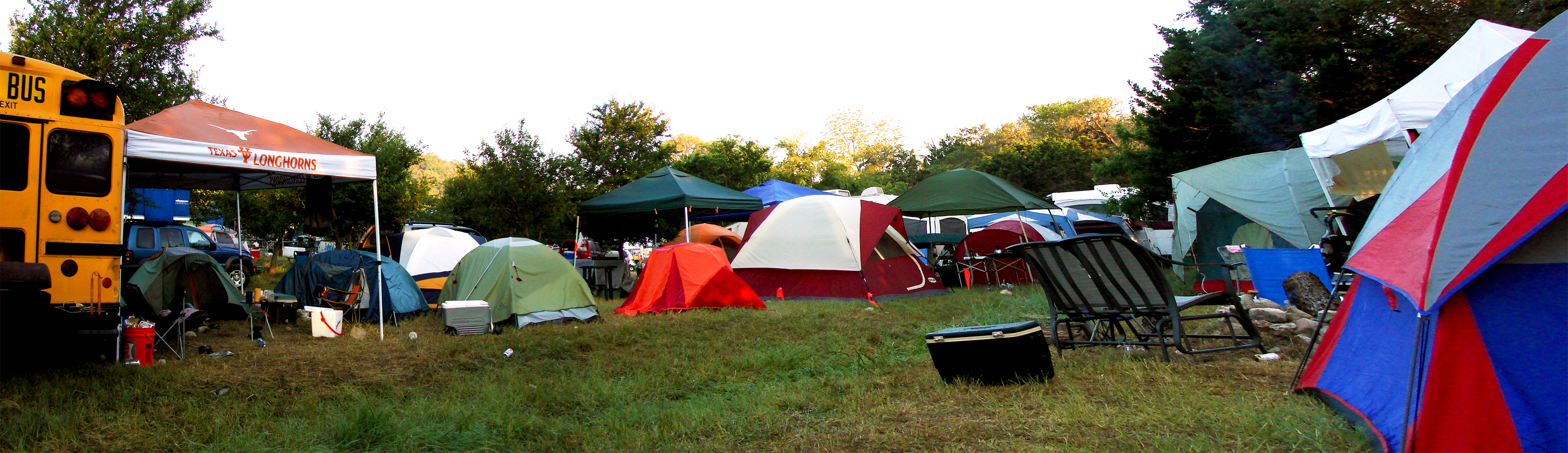
- Genre: folk, bluegrass, country, singer-songwriter, blues, jazz, Americana
- Dates: May, June
- Locations: Quiet Valley Ranch, Kerrville, Texas, United States
- Years active: 1972–2019, 2021-present
- Founders: Rod Kennedy
- Website: www.kerrvillefolkfestival.org

The Kerrville Folk Festival is a music festival with camping, held for nearly three weeks each year, in late spring/early summer, at Quiet Valley Ranch near Kerrville, Texas. The festival draws around 30,000 people. It aims to present established artists and promote new talent.

== History ==
The Kerrville Folk Festival was founded in 1972 by husband-wife team Rod Kennedy and Nancylee Davis and has been run annually since then.

Canadian folk singer Stan Rogers performed at the Kerrville Folk Festival in 1983, notable for it being his last performance before his death. He then boarded Air Canada Flight 797 out of Dallas/Fort Worth, which caught fire over Kentucky, leading to the deaths of half the passengers on board, including Rogers.

In 2002, Kennedy retired and the non-profit Texas Folk Music Foundation took over Festival management. The new board hired Dalis Allen as producer. In November 2008, the Kerrville Folk Festival and Kerrville Wine & Music Festival were acquired by the Texas Folk Music Foundation, a 501(c)3 Texas Non-profit Corporation.

In 2020, the music festival's events were moved online due to the COVID-19 pandemic. The event returned to an in-person festival in its usual location, Quiet Valley Ranch, the following year.

In past years the event has featured well-known artists such as Peter, Paul and Mary, Lyle Lovett (1980), Emmylou Harris (2015), Willie Nelson (1973), Mary Chapin Carpenter, Robert Earl Keen (1983), Lucinda Williams (1974), Bill Davis, David Crosby (2015), and Nanci Griffith (1978).

== The Grassy Hill Kerrville New Folk Competition ==
The festival places a strong emphasis on songwriting, and every year there is a New Folk Competition to discover promising new singer-songwriters. Thirty-two finalists are selected from 800 entries to share two of their own songs in an afternoon appearance on the stage of the Threadgill Theater. From these finalists, six winners are selected, and in addition to receiving cash prizes, they are invited to perform a 20-minute set each on the main stage

A win at Kerrville carries considerable prestige in the singer-songwriter community, which is in part due to the peer-professional judging and the festival's long history of recognizing emerging artists who have later gone on to wider success. There have also been notable performers who have appeared as finalists in the competition without earning a win. Artists who have performed in the competition include:

- Tom Russell & Patricia Hardin (1975 - winner)
- Rick Beresford (1977 - winner)
- Eric Taylor (1977 - winner)
- Nanci Griffith (1978 - finalist)
- Steve Earle (1978 - finalist)
- Vince Bell (1978 - winner)
- Tish Hinojosa (1979 - winner)
- Lyle Lovett (1980, 1982 - finalist)
- Robert Earl Keen (1983 - winner)
- John Gorka (1984 - winner)
- Darden Smith (1985 - winner)
- Hal Ketchum (1986 - winner)
- James McMurtry (1987 - winner)
- Buddy Mondlock (1987 - winner)
- Pierce Pettis (1987 - winner)
- David Wilcox (1988 - winner).
- Anne Feeney (1989 - winner)
- Johnsmith (1990 - winner)
- Slaid Cleaves (1992 - winner)
- Cosy Sheridan (1992 - winner)
- Mark Elliott (1993 - finalist)
- Tom Kimmel (1993 - winner)
- Ellis Paul (1994 - winner)

=== 2013 winners and finalists ===
The six New Folk Winners for 2013 were among 31 songwriter-finalists who performed during the New Folk Concerts on May 25 & 26, 2013, chosen from up to 800 entrants.

Judges	Winners	Other finalists			
Nels Andrews; Aengus Finnan; Betty Soo	Adrianne Lenker (Andover, MN); Ed Romanoff (Brooklyn, NY); Ellis (Minneapolis, MN); Honor Finnegan (New York, NY); Eric Bettencourt (Portland, ME); Paul Sachs (Manhattan, NY)	Ben Bochner (Eugene, OR); Daniel Makins (San Angelo) TX; Marina (League City, TX); Mark Philpot (Fort Worth, TX); Allie Farris (Nashville, TN); Andrew Delaney (Dallas, TX)	Arlon Bennett (Northvale, NJ); B. Sterling (Austin, TX); Bethel Steele (Boston, MA); Tommy Byrd (Austin, TX); Davey O. (Buffalo, NY); Hope Schneir (Camarillo, CA)	Doug Kent – Houston TX; The Potter's Field (Canton, MI); Julie Jean White (Dallas, TX); Karen Dahlstrom (Brooklyn, NY); Lizzy Ross (Chapel Hill, NC); Mary McAdams (Des Moines, IA)	Terry Holder (Olympia, WA); Steve Chizmadia (Peekskill, NY); The Sparrowmakers (Austin, TX); Twangtown Paramours (Nashville, TN); Wes Collins (Chapel Hill, NC); Zack Kibodeaux (Kyle, TX); Bill Valenti (Bend, OR)

=== 2012 winners and finalists ===
The six New Folk Winners for 2012 were among 32 songwriter-finalists who performed during the New Folk Concerts on May 26 & 27, 2012 — chosen from 800 submissions.

Judges	Winners	Other finalists			
Nathan Hamilton; Cary Cooper; Seth Glier	Korby Lenker (Nashville TN); Nicolette Good (San Antonio TX); Edie Carey (Chicago IL); Whit Hill (Nashville TN); Alicia McGovern (Salt Lake City UT); The Sea The Sea (Madison CT)	Terry Penney (Newfoundland Canada); Paula Held (Austin TX); Alison Lumley (Austin TX); Jon Troast (Nashville TN); Andra Suchy (Minneapolis MN); Burke Ingraffia (Point Clear AL)	Miranda Dawn (Austin TX); The Hems (Austin TX); Daniel Makins (San Angelo TX); Larry Murante (Seattle WA); Robin Macy & Kentucky White (Belle Plaine KS); Lindsay May (Vancouver BC)	Lizzy Ross (Pittsboro NC); J.A. Carter III (San Antonio TX); Michael Jerome Browne (Montreal Canada); Mikaela Kahn (Denton TX); Eric Colville of The Selkies (Ipswich MA); Paul Sachs (New York NY)	Scot Phegley (Nolensville TN); Dan Weber (Vancouver WA); Annie & Rod Capps (Chelsea MI); J Wagner (Austin TX); Anna Dagmar (New York NY); The YaYa's (Mohegan Lake NY); Michaela Anne (Brooklyn NY)

=== 2011 winners and finalists ===
The six New Folk Winners for 2011 were among 32 songwriter-finalists who performed during the New Folk Concerts on May 28 & 29, 2011—chosen from 800 submissions.

Judges	Winners	Other finalists			
Michael Camp; Johnsmith; Patrice Pike	Grace Pettis (Harrisonburg VA); Megan Burtt (Colorado); A. J. Roach (Brooklyn NY); Mai Bloomfield (Venice CA); David Moss (Austin TX); Cassie Peterson (Nashville TN)	Karyn Oliver (Boring MD); Bobby Sweet (Becket MA); Philip Gibbs (Austin TX); Eliot Bronson (Atlanta GA); Rob Lytle (Apex NC); Terry Holder (Olympia WA); Jen Cass (Bay City MI)	Tom Corbett (Woodland Hills CA); Chet O'Keefe (Nashville TN); Owen Temple (Austin TX); Steve Chizmadia (Peekskill NY); Arlon Bennett (Northvale NJ); Roy Schneider (Ft Myers FL)	Friction Farm (Greenville SC); B. Sterling Archer (Austin TX); Aaron Nathans (Wilmington DE); Tommy Byrd (Austin TX); The YaYas (Mohegan Lake NY)	Wyatt Easterling (Nashville TN); David Stukenberg (Austin TX); Randy Palmer (Amarillo TX); Twangtown Paramours (Nashville TN); Phil Henry (Rutland VT); Jane Eamon (Hastings Ont CAN); Ben Suchy (Bismarck ND)

=== 2010 winners and finalists ===
The six New Folk Winners for 2010 were among 32 songwriter-finalists who performed during the 2010 Grassy Hill Kerrville New Folk Concerts on May 29 & 30, 2010. Winners received a cash honorarium from the Texas Folk Music Foundation, Vic & Reba Heyman, and the Jim Ross Memorial Fund. They performed at the Grassy Hill Kerrville New Folk Winners Concert on Sunday, June 6, 2010.

Judges	Winners	Other finalists			
Tom Prasada-Rao; Ronny Cox; Susan Gibson	Daniel Colehour (Nashville, TN); Michael Troy (Fall River, MA); Kate Klim (Boston, MA); Andy Gullahorn (Nashville, TN); Jon Brooks (King City, ONT, CA); Kim Richardson (Mountain Home, AR)	Cassie Peterson (Nashville TN); Daniel Makins (San Angelo TX); Terry Holder (Olympia WA); John Batdorf (West Hills CA); Chris O'Brien (Somerville MA); Annie & Rod Capps (Chelsea MI); Leanne Atherton (Austin TX); Angela Easterling (Taylors SC)	Alex Woodard (San Diego CA); Neal Katz (Tyler TX); Blair Bodine (Ambler PA); Wyatt Easterling (Nashville TN); Andrew Delaney (Dallas TX); Ellen Tipper (Appleton ME); Terry Penney (Lewisport NF, Canada)	Chet O'Keefe (Nashville TN); Jen Cass (Bay City MI); Claire Small (Austin TX); Bobbie Lancaster (Bloomington IN); Gretchen Witt (Brooklyn NY); Brad Boyer (Friendswood TX)	Joe Scutella (Nashville TN); Jennifer Morrison (Sarasota FL); Mai Bloomfield (Venice CA); Sam Doores (New Orleans LA); Lucas Ohio Pattie (Pleasanton CA)

=== 2009 winners and finalists ===
The six New Folk Winners for 2009 were among 32 songwriter-finalists who performed during the 2009 Grassy Hill Kerrville New Folk Concerts on May 23 & 24, 2009. Winners received a cash honorarium from the Texas Folk Music Foundation, Vic & Reba Heyman, and the Jim Ross Memorial Fund. They performed at the Grassy Hill Kerrville New Folk Winners Concert on Sunday, May 31, 2009.

Judges	Winners	Other finalists			
Amilia k Spicer; TR Ritchie; Jon Vezner	Louise Mosrie (Nashville TN); Rebecca Loebe (Atlanta GA); Carrie Catherine (Saskatoon, SK, Canada); Ernest Troost (Los Angeles CA); Tom Neilson (Greenfield MA); Lucy Wainwright Roche (Brooklyn NY)	Lynne Hanson (Ottawa, ON, Canada); Kim Miller (Wimberley TX); Sarah Donner (Princeton NJ); Ben Mallott (Austin TX); Marc Black (Katonah NY); Angela Easterling (Taylors SC); Larry Murante (Seattle WA); Donna Beckham (West TX)	Tommy Byrd (Austin TX); Matthew Fockler (South Padre Island TX); Valorie Miller (Asheville NC); Colin McGrath (Brooklyn NY); Liz Longley (Downington PA); Bob Sima (Woodbine MD)	Sarah Sample (Seattle WA); Greg Alexander (New York NY); Jason David Hiatt (Austin TX); Gretchen Witt (Brooklyn NY); Laura Zucker (Lafayette CA); Larry Zarella (Massachusetts AK)	Joe Crookston (Ithaca NY); Shannon Wurst (Alma AR); Roy Schneider (Fort Myers FL); Jeff Martin (Portland OR); Kate Mann (Portland OR)

=== 2008 winners and finalists ===
The six New Folk Winners for 2008 were among 32 songwriter-finalists who performed during the 2008 Grassy Hill Kerrville New Folk Concerts on May 24 & 25, 2008. Winners received a cash honorarium from the Texas Folk Music Foundation, Vic & Reba Heyman, and the Jim Ross Memorial Fund. They performed at the Grassy Hill Kerrville New Folk Winners Concert on Sunday, June 1, 2008.

Judges	Winners	Other finalists			
Jud Caswell; Amy Speace; Jon Vezner	Devon Sproule (Charlottesville VA); RJ Cowdery (Columbus OH); C. J. Watson (Nashville TN); Hans York (Seattle WA); Robby Hecht (Nashville TN); BettySoo (Austin TX)	Susan Levine (Newburyport MA); Kristen Grainger (Salem OR); Joe Jencks (Cincinnati OH); Molly Venter (Austin TX); Annaliese Schiersch (Kingston WA); Chris O'Brien (Somerville MA); Rachael Sage (New York NY)	Bob Sima (Woodbine MD); Linda Sharar (Andover MA); Charlotte Kendrick (Pawling NY); Phil Henry (Rutland VT); Rebecca Loebe (Atlanta GA)	Shelley King (Austin TX); Claude "Butch" Morgan (Devine TX); Kirsten Jones (Toronto, ONT Canada); Martin Gibson (Glen Cove ME); Sonia Lee (Nashville TN); Datri Bean (Austin TX); Lojo Russo (Davenport IA); Zoe Mulford (Manchester, United Kingdom)	Emily Elbert (Boston MA); Brad Colerick (S. Pasadena CA); Laura Bullock (Somerville MA); Chad Elliott (Spencer IA); Terry Holder (Olympia WA); T. Nile (Vancouver BC, Canada)

=== 2007 New Folk Competition ===
The 2007 New Folk Competition was held May 26 & 27.

Judges	Winners	Other finalists			
Jonathan Byrd; Johnsmith; Cosy Sheridan	Danny Schmidt (Austin TX); Storyhill (Bozeman MT); Carla Gover (Richmond KY); David Llewellyn (Nashville TN); John Wort Hannam (Fort Macleod, Alberta Canada); Anthony da Costa (Pleasantville NY)	Datri Bean (Austin TX); Kate Klim (Somerville MA); porterdavis (Austin TX); Noah Earle (Hallsville MO); Scott & Michelle Dalziel (Maquoketa IA); Raina Rose (Portland OR); Michael McGarrah (Phoenix AZ)	Chuck E Costa (New Haven CT); Donal Hinely (Springfield TN); Dave Potts (Auburn AL); Jessica Heine (Edmonton Alb, Canada); Jan Smith (Afton VA); Owen Temple (Madison WI)	KC Clifford (Oklahoma City OK); Ray Younkin (Houston TX); Wil Maring (Cobden IL); Siobhan Quinn & Michael Bowers; Kevin McGee (Lexington SC); Laura Zucker (Lafayette CA)	Pat Wictor (Brooklyn NY); Emily Kurn (Anchorage AK); Eric Hansen (Tucson AZ); Edie Carey (Boston MA); Derek Aramburu (Cypress TX); Elana Arian (New York NY); Lindsay Mac (Cambridge MA)

=== 2006 New Folk Competition ===
The 2006 New Folk Competition was held on May 27 and 28.

Judges	Winners	Other finalists			
Jimmy LaFave; Pat Pattison; SONiA	Antje Duvekot (Somerville MA); Jud Caswell (Brunswick ME); Gordy Quist (Austin TX); KJ Denhert (Ossining NY); Diana Jones (Nashville TN); Andrew Smith (Kelowna BC Canada)	Robert Tubb/String Gravy (Glendale AZ); Jan Smith (North Garden VA); Zane Williams (Nashville TN); Lisa Richards (Austin TX); Tom Neilson (Montague MA); Lisa Rogers (Austin TX); Jaime Michaels (Santa Fe NM)	Dave Potts (Auburn AL); Lis Harvey (Davis CA); Dave Pahanish (California PA); Liz Carlisle (Cambridge MA); Joe Truman (Nashville TN); Amy Speace (New York NY); KC Clifford (Oklahoma City OK)	Kendall James (Houlton ME); Charlotte Kendrick (Pawling NY); Jason Spooner (Portland ME); Morgan Bracy (Antioch TN); Michael Tiernan (Del Mar, CA); Marilyn Rucker (Austin TX)	Gretchen Witt (Brooklyn NY); Alastair Moock (Medford MA); Susan Clark / The Buckerettes (Cedar Crest NM); Tom Mowrey (Sykesville PA); Jay Mankita (High Falls NY); Sonia Lee (Nashville TN)

=== 2005 New Folk Competition ===
The 2005 New Folk Competition was held on May 28 and 29.

Judges	Winners	Other finalists			
Caroline Aiken; John William Davis; Jim Photoglo	Jack Harris, Powys Wales, United Kingdom; Randy Browning, South Berwick ME; Erik Balkey, Philadelphia PA; Andy Corwin, West Hills CA; Beth Wood, Arlington TX; David Stoddard, Beaver Dam WI	Mike Morris – Strafford NH; Richard Ruane – Ripton VT; Datri Bean – Seattle WA; Justin Roth – Lake Elmo MN; Greg Klyma – Cheektowaga NY; Rob Hinkal – Owings Mills MD; Amy Martin – Missoula MT	David Morreale – Baltimore MD; Treva Blomquist – Nashville TN; Karen Mal – Austin TX; Carl Cacho – West Newbury MA; Kate Redgate – Newbury MA; Dave Murphy – Montclair NJ; Tony Laiolo – Nashville TN	Jim Keaveny – Austin TX; Michael Bowers – Alexandria VA; Claude "Butch" Morgan – Devine TX; Liz Carlisle – Cambridge MA; Gary Seber – Houston TX; Tim Burlingame – Sherman Oaks CA	Kathrin Shorr – Sherman Oaks CA; Meg Hutchinson – Cambridge MA; Doug Wintch – Salt Lake City UT; Corinne West – Alameda CA; Stan Swiniarski – Dracut MA; Sean Altman – New York NY

=== 2004 New Folk Competition ===
The 2004 Competition was held on May 29 and 30.

Judges	Winners	Other finalists			
Slaid Cleaves; Ruthie Foster; Eric Schwartz	John William Davis, Indian Hills CO; Julie Clark, Norfolk VA; Effron White, Fayetteville AR; Cary Cooper – Garland TX; Idgy Vaughn – Austin TX; Claudia Nygaard – Nashville TN	Michael Troy – Somerset MA; Cherie Call – Springville UT; John McGill – Crestline CA; David Llewellyn – Nashville TN; Robert Frith – Sugarland TX; Carla Ulbrich – Athens GA; Brent Mitchell – Racine WI	Rachel Garlin – Berkeley CA; Kelly McCune – Pasadena CA; Naomi Sommers – Allston MA; Jaime Michaels – Santa Fe NM; Dave Potts – Auburn AL; Beth Cahill – Wakefield Quebec, Canada; Marc Herman – Watertown MA	Lisa Rogers – Austin TX; Jim Bizer – Franklin MI; Bill Kahler – Smyrna GA; Jody William Smith – Sherman Oaks CA; Drew Nelson – Grand Rapids MI; Donna Frost – Hendersonville TN	Erik Balkey – Philadelphia PA; Scott & Michelle Dalziel – Maquoketa IA; Justin Roth – Lake Elmo MN; Ryc Ward – West Stockbridge MA; Jesse Thurgood – Payson UT; Gregg Cagno – New Hope PA

=== 2003 New Folk Competition ===
The 2003 Competition was held on May 24 and 25.

Judges	Winners	Other finalists			
Tracy Grammer; Aengus Finnan; David Roth	David Bailey – Earlysville VA; Rob Heath – Edmonton Alberta, Canada; Kathy Hussey – Nashville TN; Jonathan Byrd – Carrboro NC; Colin Brooks – Austin TX; Anais Mitchell – Middlebury VT	Caroline Currie – Seattle WA; Teddy Goldstein – New York NY; Lauren Fine – Austin TX; Jaime Michaels – Santa Fe NM; Andy & Cheryl Winston – Boulder CO; Jenny Reynolds – Wellesley MA; Ralston Bowles – Grand Rapids MI	Lisa Rogers – Austin TX; Kevin Briody – Ridgfield CT; Juliet Wyers – Portland OR; David Llewellyn – Nashville TN; Rob Boyle – St. Louis MO; Dave Potts – Auburn AL; Kerri Powers – Franklin MA	Steve Chizmadia – Manhasset NY; Jason Spooner – Portland ME; Vicki Chew – Cleveland OH; Foscoe Jones – Austin TX; Julianna Waters & Barry Crannell – Portland OR; Larry Kenneth Potts – Petaluma CA	Scott Idlet – Centennial CO; Jenn Adams – Stevensville MT; Joe Stanton – Sechelt British Columbia, Canada; Terry Farmer – Ann Arbor MI; Elizabeth Wills – Fort Worth TX; John Haley-Walker – Fairfax CA

== Kerrville Wine and Music Festival ==
The Kerrville Wine & Music Festival, called "Little Folk" is also hosted by the ranch over Labor Day Weekend. Both events share a website.

== List of past performers ==
This list of past performers at the KFF is incomplete.

- David Amram
- Matt Andersen
- David M. Bailey
- The Belleville Outfit
- Bobby Bridger
- Bob Brozman
- Hamilton Camp
- Mary Chapin Carpenter
- Guy Clark
- Judy Collins
- Dana Cooper
- Ronny Cox
- David Crosby
- Rodney Crowell
- Cypress Swamp Stompers Archived November 17, 2017, at the Wayback Machine
- Jimmy Driftwood
- Jonathan Edwards
- Joe Ely
- Deirdre Flint
- disappear fear
- Dixie Chicks
- Steven Fromholz
- Bob Gibson
- Vance Gilbert
- Eliza Gilkyson
- Emmylou Harris
- Vince Gill (as part of Bluegrass ReVue, in 1975)
- Jimmie Dale Gilmore
- Nanci Griffith
- Grimalkin
- Butch Hancock
- Patricia Hardin
- Carolyn Hester
- Sara Hickman
- Tish Hinojosa
- Ray Wylie Hubbard
- Janis Ian
- The Indigo Girls
- Flaco Jiménez
- Jitterbug Vipers
- Robert Earl Keen
- Tom Kimmel
- Jimmy LaFave
- John A. Lomax Jr.
- Lyle Lovett
- Mary McCaslin
- Melanie Safka
- Mercy River Boys
- Augie Meyers
- Willie Nelson
- Gary P. Nunn
- Odetta
- Tom Paxton
- Peter Paul & Mary
- Shawn Phillips
- Willis Alan Ramsey
- Tom Prasada Rao
- Gamble Rogers
- Stan Rogers (died on Air Canada Flight 797 after performing in 1983)
- Peter Rowan
- Tom Rush
- Shake Russell
- Tom Russell
- Peter Madcat Ruth
- Don Sanders
- Mike Seeger
- Martin Sexton
- Singing Christians
- Michael Peter Smith
- Bill Staines
- B. W. Stevenson
- Eric Taylor
- Trout Fishing in America
- John Vandiver
- Townes Van Zandt
- Jerry Jeff Walker
- Susan Werner
- Cheryl Wheeler
- Rusty Wier
- Dar Williams
- Lucinda Williams
- Peter Yarrow
- Steve Young
- The Steel Wheels
- Tim York and Michael Hawthorne as T & M Express

Kate Wolf

== See also ==
- The Texas Campfire Tapes
