= Anthony da Costa =

American singer-songwriter

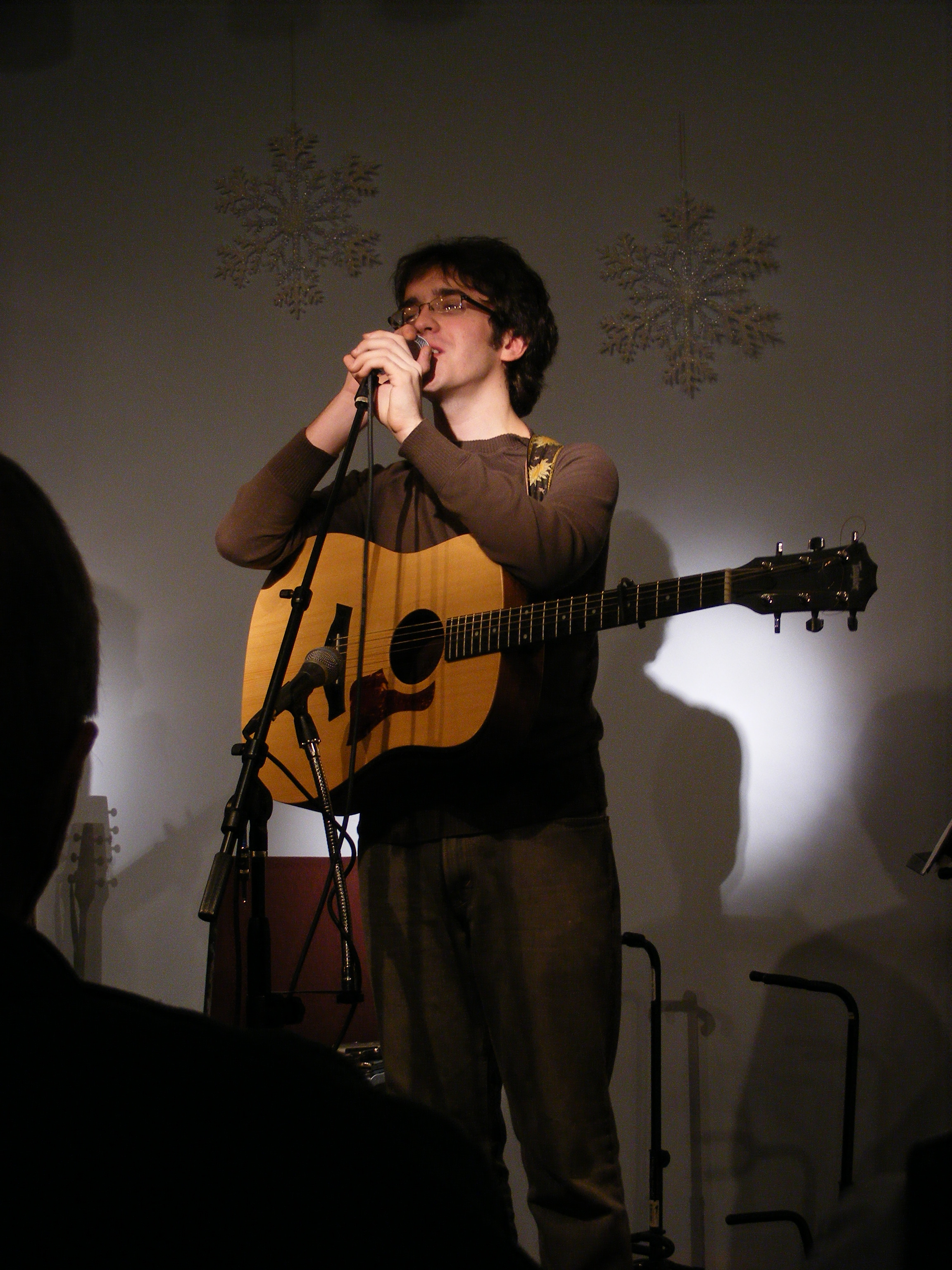
- Nashville, 2017

Background information
- Born: Anthony da Costa; January 3, 1991 (age 35); Bronx, NY, US
- Origin: Pleasantville, NY
- Genres: Folk, Singer-Songwriter, Americana
- Instruments: Guitar, harmonica, piano
- Website: anthonydacosta.com

Anthony da Costa (born 1991 in Bronx, NY) is an American singer-songwriter based in Nashville, TN. He has been writing and performing original material since he was 13 years old. He names Ryan Adams, Dan Bern, and Bob Dylan as some of his biggest songwriting influences. He attended Columbia University and graduated with a bachelor's degree in ancient Greek and Roman history in 2013. In 2016, Anthony released his latest solo album, "Da Costa," which was self-produced and features Aaron Lee Tasjan, Devon Sproule, and members of Ben Kweller, Eric Johnson and Okkervil River. Anthony is also an in-demand live and session guitarist, having toured with Aoife O'Donovan of Crooked Still, Jimmy LaFave, Joy Williams, the Grammy-award-winning songwriter Sarah Jarosz, and two-time IBMA Guitar Player of the Year Molly Tuttle.

== Awards and honors ==
- Winner of the 2007 Kerrville Folk Festival New Folk
- Winner 2007 Falcon Ridge Folk Festival Emerging Artist Competition.
- 2007 Mountain Stage New Song NE Regional Finalist
- Showcased at the Tin Pan South Songwriters Festival in Nashville
- Nominated as Folk Alliance Emerging Artist of the Year.
- Received specific mention in The New York Times by virtue of his sideburns.
- 2009 Named one of WFUV's New Artists to Watch

== Discography ==
=== Albums ===
- Rearrange (2006)
- Quality Time (2007)
- Typical American Tragedy (2008)
- Not Afraid of Nothing (2009)
- Secret Handshake (2012)
- DaCosta (2016)
- Feet On the Dashboard (2020)
- What Plans? (2021)
- I Should Call My Mother (2022)

=== EPs ===
- Already There EP (2005)
- Spring EP (2013)
- Shadow Love EP (2019)

=== Collaborations ===
- Bad Nights/Better Days (w/ Abbie Gardner) (2008)
- Neighbors (w/ Adam Levy) (2017)
