= Rebecca Loebe =

American singer-songwriter (born 1983)

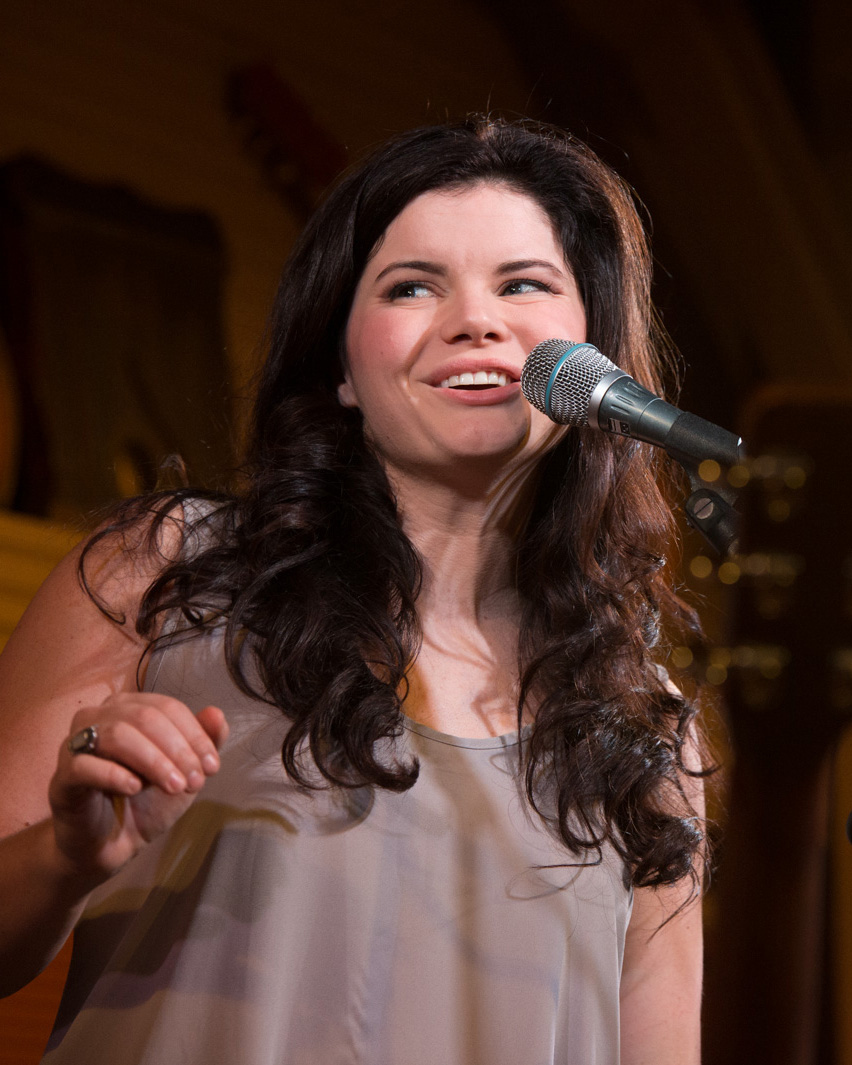
- Loebe performing in 2013

Background information
- Born: Rebecca Ann Loebe; August 17, 1983 (age 43); Arlington, Virginia, US
- Genres: indie rock, pop rock
- Occupations: Singer-songwriter, musician
- Instruments: Vocals, guitar
- Years active: 2004–present
- Website: www.rebeccaloebe.com

Rebecca Ann Loebe (born August 17, 1983) is an American musician, singer-songwriter, and record producer. She has performed and toured with such recording artists as Shawn Colvin, The Civil Wars, Gregory Alan Isakov, Mary Chapin Carpenter, and Ellis Paul amongst others. In 2011 she made her international broadcast television debut on The Voice (American TV series) . In addition to being a solo singer she is a founding member of Austin-based band Nobody's Girl.

== Early life ==
Loebe was born in Alexandria, Virginia to parents Albert Loebe and Cecelia Bonfils. She and her family moved to Atlanta, Georgia when she was eight years old. She performed in public school choruses and musicals and began playing guitar at age 11. In her sophomore year of high school, her father took her to Eddie's Attic in Decatur, Georgia where she began to play at the Monday night open mic. Loebe graduated high school at the age of 16 and was accepted to Berklee College of Music as a vocal principal where she graduated with a degree in Music Production and Engineering.

After college Loebe worked at a recording studio in Boston as an audio engineer. While working there, Loebe snuck into the studio to record demos of her own songs; these recordings comprised her first album Hey, It’s a Lonely World which was released independently in December 2004.

== Music career ==
Initially, Loebe continued to work as a freelance audio engineer while performing at colleges and coffeehouses on the east coast of the US. She has said in interviews that she worked as an assistant engineer at Gallop Studios in Atlanta in between tour dates for over a year to barter time for the recording of her second full-length album Mystery Prize.'.

In 2010, Loebe's album, “Mystery Prize”, spent 10 weeks on the Americana Top 40 chart. She signed an album deal with European record label Continental Record Services. She was slated to perform on a European tour in the Spring of 2011 but the tour was canceled when she was cast on the first season of NBC's The Voice.

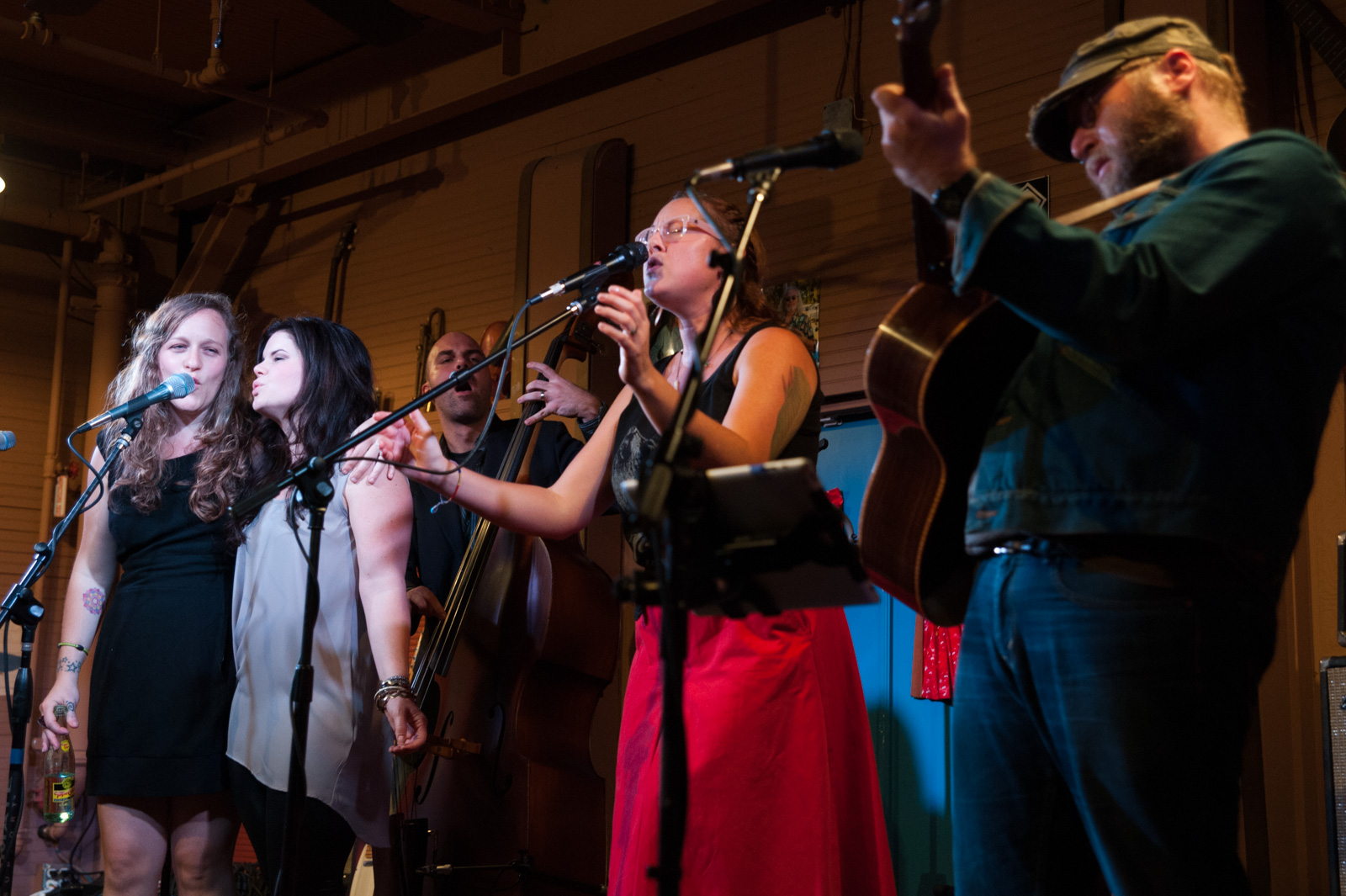
Loebe performing in 2013, L-R Raina Rose, Loebe, Will Robertson, Bernice Hembree, Bryan Hembree

Loebe recorded and released Circus Heart in 2012, produced by Austin songwriter Matt the Electrician on the Black Wolf Records imprint. The album was funded by fans who pre-ordered the album off of her website. Circus Heart was released in Europe by Continental Record Services.

In 2013 Loebe toured nationally with folk songwriter Ellis Paul. She also toured in Texas and Oklahoma with Raina Rose and Smokey & The Mirror, and those shows were recorded by Virginia-based Americana label Goose Creek Music and was released as a 3-album live set in 2014.

In 2014, Loebe led a creativity workshop and performed at Yokota Air Base in Fussa, Tokyo. Later in 2014, Rebecca performed in The Netherlands for the first time and has performed every year since. On her second tour of The Netherlands in 2015, she performed on Voetbal Inside, a sports show hosted by Dutch football star Johan Derksen.

Blink, her fourth full-length studio album, was released in 2017. Record label executive Denby Auble saw Loebe performing while on tour promoting the album and offered her a record deal on Blue Corn Music.

In 2018, Loebe co-founded the band Nobody’s Girl with songwriters Betty Soo and Grace Pettis. The group was initially formed as a one-time package tour but after a songwriting retreat at Fischer Studios in Fischer, TX they were offered a record deal by Luckyhounds Music and recorded their first EP Waterline.

Loebe was mentioned as a new favorite musician of the character Morgan, in the 2018 New York Times Bestselling novel, Leah on The Offbeat, written by Becky Albertalli.

In 2019, Loebe released her fifth full-length studio album, Give Up Your Ghosts. Her single, Growing Up was featured in Rolling Stone magazine listed as the Top 10 Best Country and Americana Songs of the Week.

In November 2019, Loebe announced plans to celebrate the 10-year anniversary of her album “Mystery Prize": she planned an intimate, acoustic concert tour in 2020 where she was to re-visit songs and stories from the album. However, due to the COVID-19 pandemic, those dates had to be postponed to 2022.

In July 2021, Nobody's Girl released their first full-length album, titled Nobody's Girl.

== Awards and recognition ==
- 2019 - Give Up Your Ghosts peaked at #9 on Billboard Charts Heatseekers Northeast
- 2018 - Recipient of the Austin-based Black Fret Grant Award
- 2011 - Come As You Are peaked at #38 on the Billboard Charts on May 14, 2011
- 2010 - Mystery Prize peaked at #24 on the Americana Top 40 charts and ranked #89 on the Top 100 Americana Albums of the Year - Americana Music Association
- 2009 - Winner of the Grassy Hill New Folk Songwriting Competition at the Kerrville Folk Festival

== The Voice ==
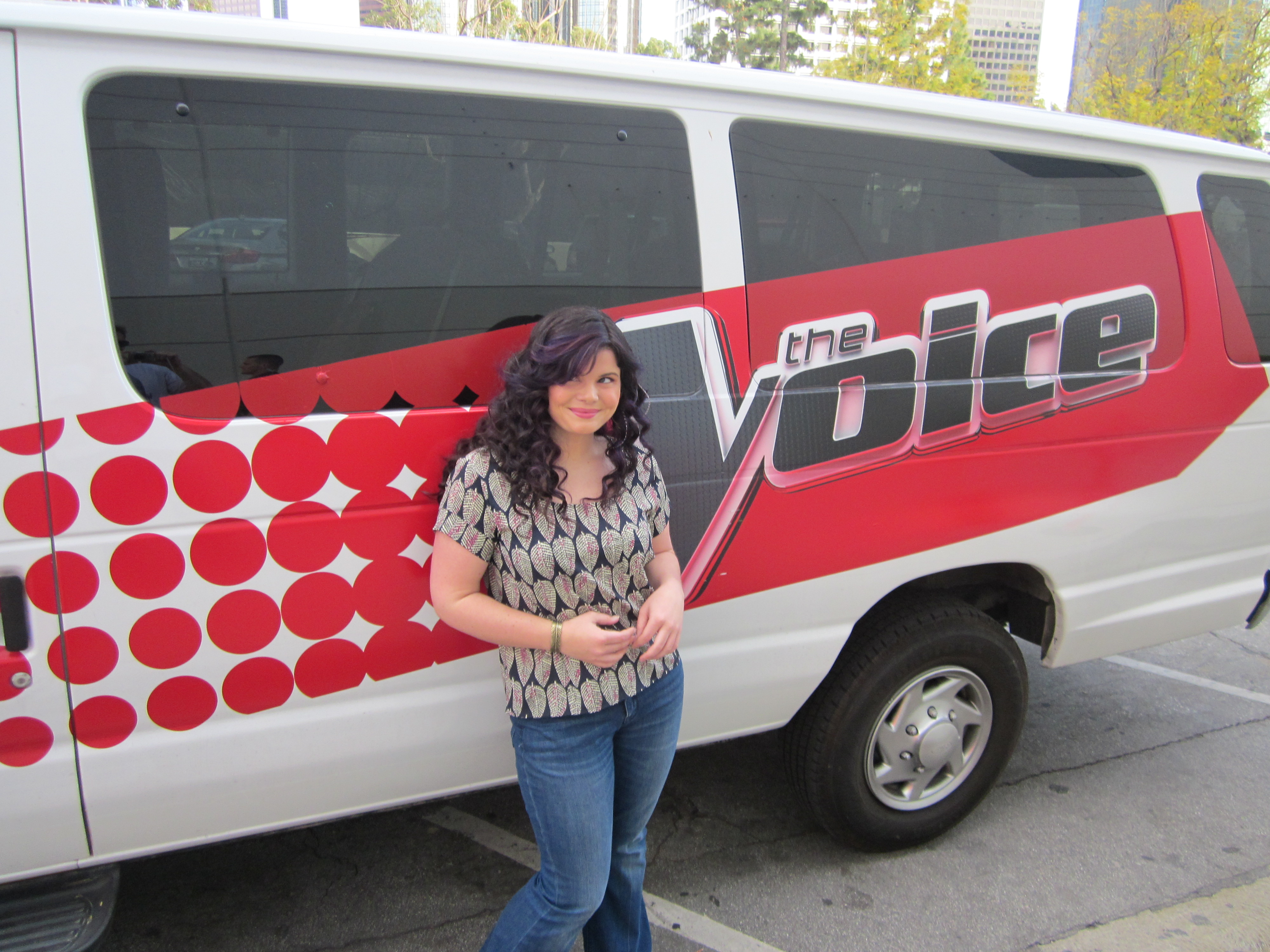
Loebe on the set, The Voice 2011

In 2011, Loebe was invited to audition for the first season of NBC's "The Voice," where she sang Nirvana's "Come As You Are" in the auditions, making Adam Levine's team and charting on iTunes in the US, Europe and South America. In the Battle rounds, she sang "Creep" against Devon Barley, at which point Barley advanced and Loebe left the show. Her version of “Come As You Are” was the only recording by a non-semifinalist to be included on the compilation album The Voice: Season 1 Highlights released by Republic Records.

== Discography ==
Album name	Format	Year released
Hey, It's a Lonely World	LP	2004
The Brooklyn Series	EP	2007
Mystery Prize	LP	2010
Bees & Zombies	EP	2011
Circus Heart	LP	2012
Three Nights Live (with Raina Rose and Smokey & The Mirror)	LP	2014
Rebecca Loebe Live	LP	2014
Vittles & Valentines	EP	2016
Blink	LP	2017
Waterline (with Nobody's Girl)	EP	2018
Filthy Jokes (as Rebecca Loebe & Findlay Napier)	EP	2018
Give up Your Ghosts	LP	2019
Nobody's Girl (with Nobody's Girl)	LP	2021
