= Eric Schwartz (songwriter) =

American singer-songwriter

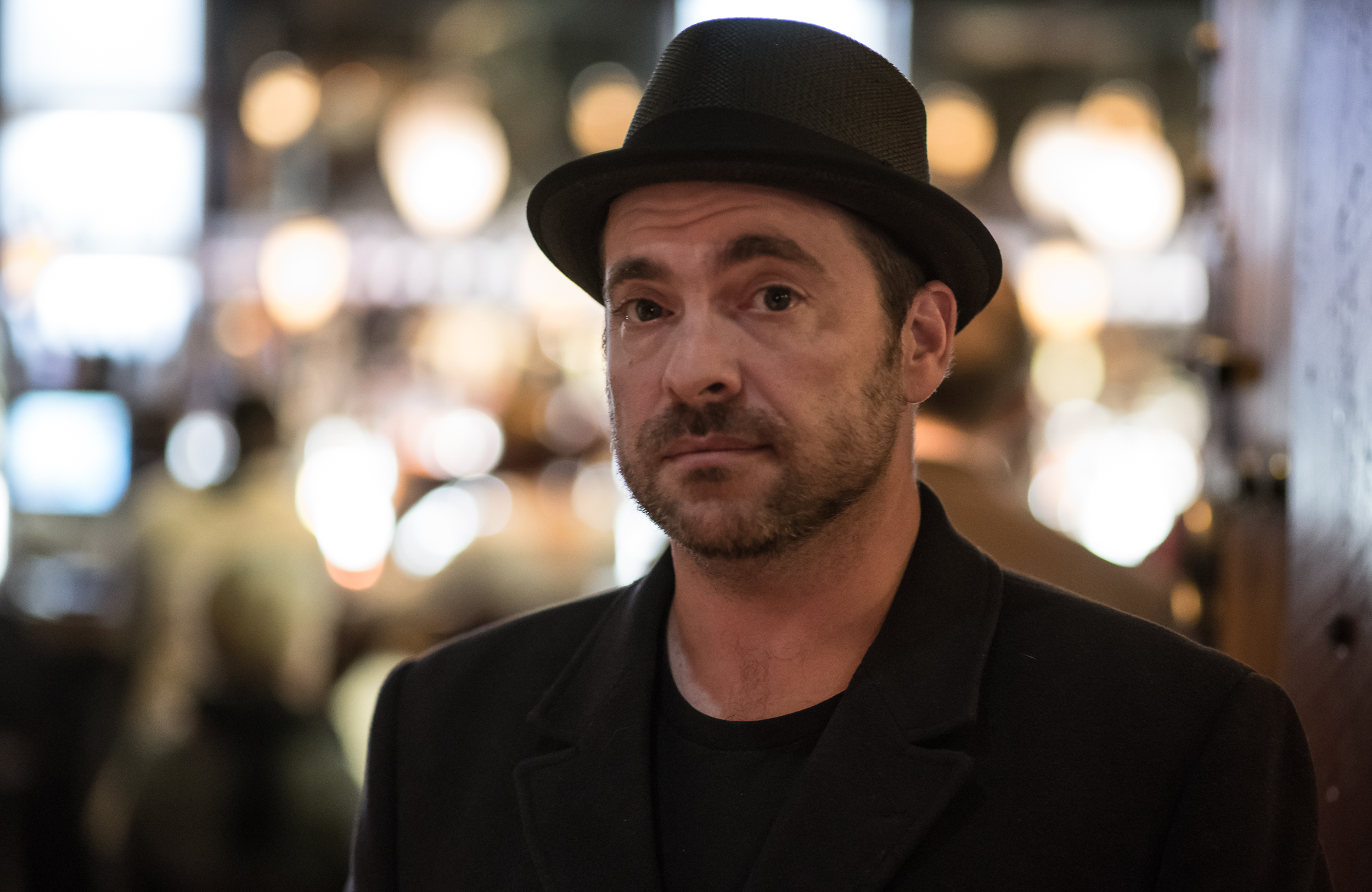
- Schwartz in 2015

Background information
- Also known as: Eric "Red" Schwartz
- Born: Eric Schwartz; New York City
- Origin: Newton, Massachusetts, U.S.
- Genres: Folk, soul, satire, comedy
- Occupation: Singer-songwriter
- Instruments: Guitar, piano, vocals
- Website: ericschwartz.com

Eric "Red" Schwartz is an American folk singer-songwriter and musical satirist known for his often humorous, sexually explicit lyrics, as in the songs "Clinton Got A Blowjob" and "Who Da Bitch Now". His video "Keep Your Jesus Off My Penis" has been downloaded over a million times. He cites Dr. Demento as an inspiration. He graduated from Tufts University with a degree in biology and worked as an actor and guitarist, before moving to Greenwich Village to begin his songwriting career. He has played several times at the Kerrville Folk Festival and was a finalist in the songwriting contest in 2001. He was a winner of the Falcon Ridge Folk Festival Emerging Artist Showcase.

Schwartz's live performances include appearances at The Bottom Line in New York, Bluebird Café in Nashville, and Club Passim in Cambridge, Massachusetts. During COVID-19 restrictions, Schwartz took part in the virtual Hard Luck Café concert series held in partnership with the Cinema Arts Centre in Huntington, New York.

He now lives in Cambridge, Massachusetts.

== Awards ==
- International Songwriting Competition Comedy/Novelty for song "Clinton Got A Blowjob" (2008)
- Just Plain Folks Comedy/Novelty CD of the Year for album Redder than Ever (2009)

== Discography ==
- That's How It's Gonna Be (1999)
- Pleading The First: Songs My Mother Hates (2000)
- Sunday Blue (2002)
- Self-Bootleg (2003)
- Redder than Ever (2006)
- "Christmastime in La La Land" (With The Seasonals) (2010)
- The Aristocrat (2013)
- The Better Man (2014)
