= Joe Crookston =

American folk singer

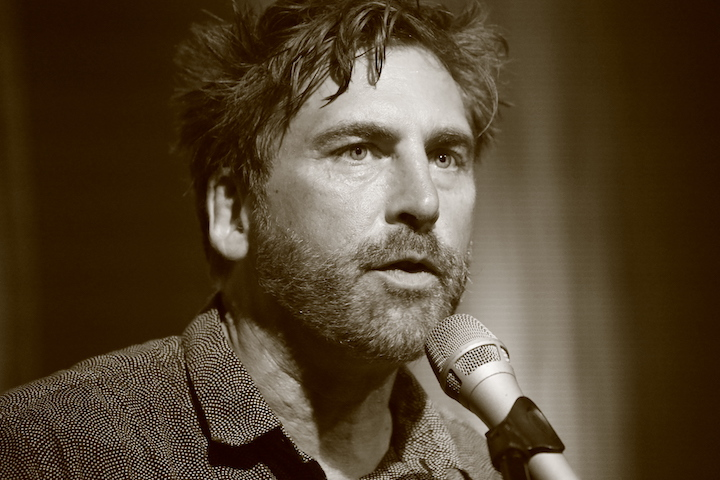

Background information
- Origin: Randolph, Ohio
- Genres: Folk, Americana
- Instruments: Vocals, guitar, violin, banjo, slide guitar
- Label: Milagrito Records
- Website: www.joecrookston.com

Joe Crookston is an American folk singer from Randolph, Ohio and based in Ithaca, New York. As of February 2025, he has released eight albums and four EPs on the Milagrito Records label including these award-winning albums: 2004's "Fall Down as the Rain," 2008's "Able Baker Charlie & Dog," 2011's "Darkling & the BlueBird Jubilee," 2014's "Georgia I'm Here," and the first four of nine EPs (chapters) in a multi-year project titled "Nine Becomes One."

== Biography ==
Crookston's family origins include Hungary, and his website reports that polkas and Eastern European food figured in his upbringing. Joe Crookston was born and raised in rural Ohio and attended Kent State University. While at college, he attended the Kent State Folk Festival and his musical interests shifted to focus on folk music, causing him to sell his classical guitar and acquire a steel stringed acoustic. Crookston lived in Seattle, Washington from 1996 until 2004. For a year during this time he worked with detained youth at the King County Correctional Facility on Jackson Street in Seattle Washington.

As of 2026 he is based in Ithaca, New York and tours extensively around the U.S., Canada and Ireland.

Crookston has shared stages with Gordon Lightfoot, Suzanne Vega, Judy Collins, Dar Williams, Mary Gauthier, Shawn Colvin, The Decemberists, and John Gorka

8 acclaimed studio albums of award-winning songs, many of which have been covered by other musicians.

Two songs, Blue Tattoo, and Brooklyn in July have been made into feature films available on Amazon Prime.

Between 2023 to 2025, Crookston released the collection NINE BECOMES ONE.

Nominated for Best of Folk Alliance by Folk Alliance International (2025).

Crookston had the #1 song on DJ/Folk Radio (October - December, 2024). "Oh Mercy, Where are You Now?"

Able Baker Charlie & Dog was awarded “Album of the Year” by Folk Alliance International (2009), indicating that it received more radio airplay than any other folk album released the year prior and received the award alongside Roger McGuinn.

Chosen as Folk Alliance International’s “Artist in Residence” (2016) and invited to collaborate and perform “The Letters of Florence Hemphill” as part of the keynote gathering featuring Judy Collins.

Invited to play high profile music festivals such as The Goderich Roots Festival, The Kerrville Folk Festival, The Falcon Ridge Folk Festival, The Philadelphia Folk Festival, 30A Songwriters Festival, Mariposa Folk Festival, Caramoor Music Fest, Fayetteville Roots Festival, The Heartwood Stage Festival

Performs in many iconic music venues such as Club Passim, The Hangar Theatre, The Irvington Theater, The Garland Theatre, The Guthrie Center, Heartwood SoundStage, The Chatfield Arts Center, Godfrey Daniels, Evanston SPACE, The Columbus Performing Arts Center, and The Deane Center for the Performing Arts

Crookston's first label album, Fall Down as the Rain, was selected by Performing Songwriter Magazine as one of 2004's top 12 self-produced independent recordings, and was featured on National Public Radio's All Songs Considered, The Midnight Special and Folkscene. Crookston was a finalist in the Mountain Stage NewSong contest.

In 2007, Crookston received a Rockefeller Foundation grant for a project called "Songs of the Finger Lakes". Emulating Woody Guthrie, he spent a year traveling in the Finger Lakes region of New York state, collecting stories to turn into songs. Four songs from this project were incorporated into his second album.

In the summer of 2007, audiences at the Falcon Ridge Folk Festival selected him as one of the artists they most wanted to have perform at the following year's festival. In Spring 2008, Crookston and the other "Most Wanted" award winners (Anthony da Costa, Randall Williams and Lindsay Mac) were sent on a 23 concert promotional tour in the northeastern U.S., with venues including the Kennedy Center and Club Passim.

In February 2009, his second CD, Able Baker Charlie & Dog was given the "Album of the Year" award by the Folk Alliance International in a ceremony in Memphis, Tennessee, indicating that it received more radio airplay than any other folk album released in 2008.

In February 2016, he was named Artist in Residence by the Folk Alliance International. He collaborated with The National WW1 Museum and Memorial in Kansas City MO to write the song, "The Letters of Florence Hemphill" about a 19 year old nurse who served in France during WWI.

January 19, 2018, he had an art installment and concert at True North Gallery in Waterdown, Ontario. His paintings are installed in the gallery alongside paintings by other musicians, including Andy Warhol, Bob Dylan, and Janis Joplin.

== Music ==
=== Earlier albums ===
Crookston released three CDs on his own independent label: Nobody Told Me, Michaelangelo Knew, and Rounding the Square.

=== Fall Down as the Rain (2004) ===
- Fall Down as the Rain
- Don't Bring Me Flowers
- The Good Stuff
- The Sylvan Song
- Satisfied (Charlie and the Chocolate Factory)
- Mostly
- If I Say Yes
- Dance and Sway
- Blue
- Little Pink
- Poor Me / (May There Always Be Sunshine)
- Mostly (the Chaco Canyon live mix)

=== Able Baker Charlie & Dog (2008) ===
- The Logical Song, a cover version of a Supertramp song
- John Jones, from the Finger Lakes Project, about an escaped slave who relocated to Elmira, New York and became part of the Underground Railroad
- Wandering Shepherd, by Dan Fogelberg
- Freddy the Falcon, based on a prison inmate Crookston worked with
- Brooklyn in July, based on the story of Frank Walker, a chauffeur in 1945; the song inspired the short film Brooklyn in July
- Red Rooster in the Mash Pile, from the Finger Lakes Project, based on the story of a family's chickens getting drunk from the wastage of an illegal still during Prohibition
- Able Baker Charlie and Dog, based on his grandfather Joe Gnap's memories of working as a Seabee to construct the runways on Tinian island that were used to launch the atomic bomb attacks on Japan.
- Mending Walls
- Hands, Metal and Wood
- Blue Tattoo, from the Finger Lakes Project, about an Auschwitz survivor explaining her tattoo to her young daughter.
- Bird by Bird
- Red Rooster in the Mash Pile (Live in Ithaca, NY)
- The Rutabaga Curl (Live in Ithaca, NY)

=== Darkling & the BlueBird Jubilee (2011) ===
- I Sing
- Caitlin at the Window, about Caitlin Thomas
- Mercy Now, by Mary Gauthier
- Good Luck John
- The Nazarene
- Darkling & the BlueBird Jubilee
- Everything Here is Good
- Wilderness Alone
- Blue, also on his 2004 album
- A Friend Like You
- To Keep You Warm
- Darkling/BlueBird (Fear & Transcend)

=== Georgia I'm Here (2014) ===
- Georgia I'm Here (The Invocation)
- Riding the Train (The Dream Mix)
- Impermanent Things, by Peter Himmelman
- Tuesday Morning (For Roko)
- Big Sky (In the Middle of Nowhere)
- Miner in the Mourning
- Black Dress (I'm in Love with a Woman)
- Riding the Train (The Meter Maid Mix)
- Pretty Saro
- Fall Down as the Rain (2014)
- Out on the Run (For Josie Rae)
- Georgia I'm Here (Amen)

=== Nine Becomes One ===
==== Chapter 9 (Start Brave) (2023) ====
- Looking for Yes
- Blue Light
- Photography
- Garlic
- Get Myself Free!

==== Chapter 8 (Child Heal) (2023) ====
- The Nazarene (The History)
- Right Beside You Now (The Inner Child)
- Golden Boy (Story & Wisdom)
- Part of Me (All the Parts)
- Dapple the Light (Transcend & Rest)

==== Chapter 7 (Time Become) (2024) ====
- We Are Turning Gold
- Look for Trouble
- We'll Be Ok
- Oh Mercy Where Are You Now?
- Rattlesnake Tail (Little Bit Lovely)

==== Chapter 6 (Water Fire) (2025) ====
- Anthony
- New Year's Eve (The Funeral)
- Famine Bones
- Wheel Wagon (The Fiddler)
- Quandary Street
