= Not by Chance =

Not by Chance may refer to:

- Not by Chance (band)
- Not by Chance (album), by Joe Martin
- Not by Chance (film) (Não por Acaso), 2007 Brazilian film by Philippe Barcinski, starring Rodrigo Santoro and Letícia Sabatella

== See also ==
- By chance
- Chance (disambiguation)
