= Red Molly =

American folk trio

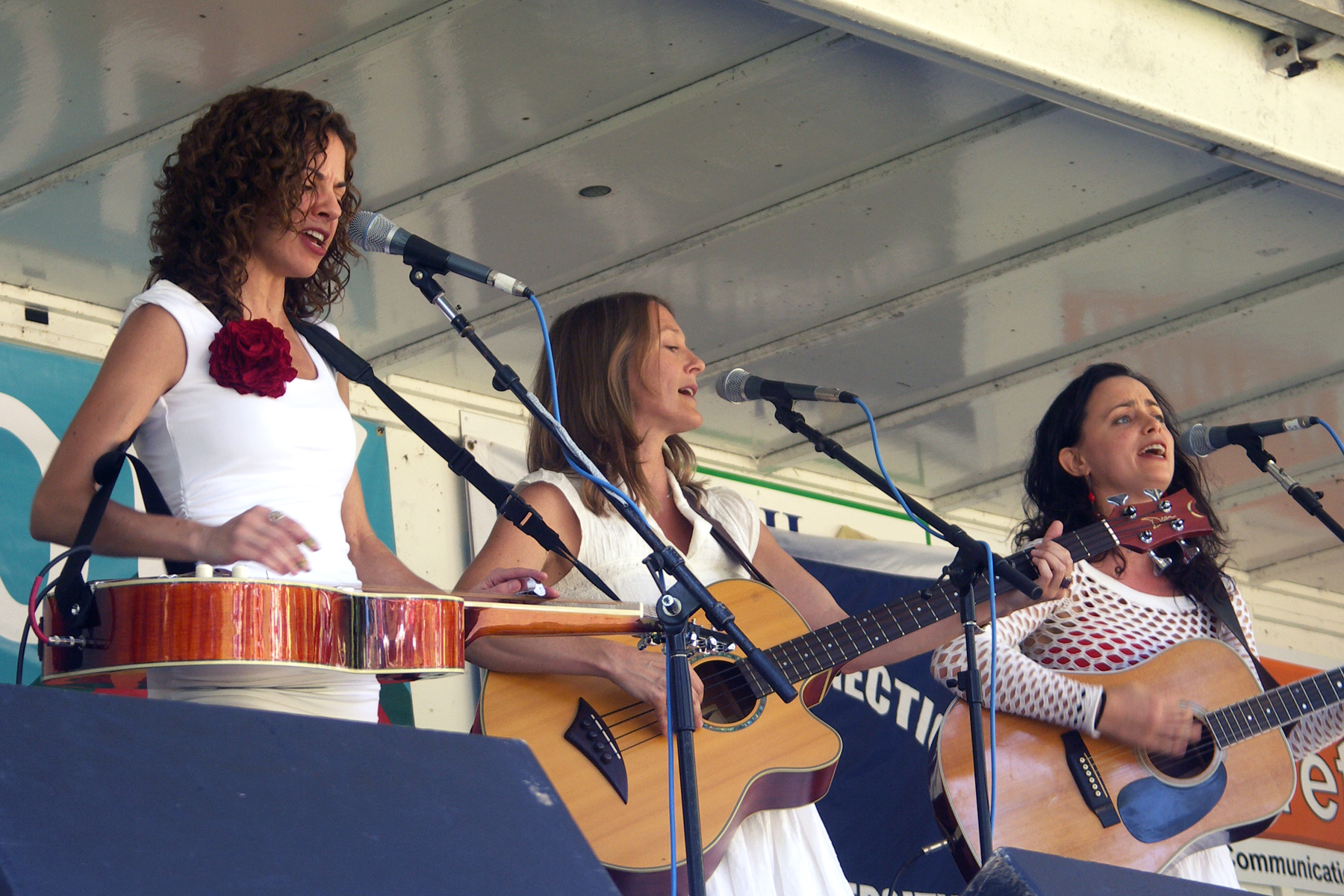
- Red Molly at the Connecticut Folk Festival in New Haven, Connecticut

Background information
- Origin: New York
- Genres: Folk, bluegrass
- Years active: 2004–present
- Members: Laurie MacAllister; Abbie Gardner; Molly Venter
- Past members: Carolann Solebello
- Website: redmolly.com

Red Molly is a folk trio consisting of Laurie MacAllister (vocals, bass), Abbie Gardner (vocals, guitar, Dobro, lap steel guitar), and Molly Venter (vocals, guitar). They perform original works composed by each of the group members as well as other songwriters, such as Hank Williams, Gillian Welch, Richard Thompson, Mark Erelli, Susan Werner, Jake Armerding, Ryan Adams and Amy Speace. Their fans are known as "Redheads".

== History ==
Red Molly was formed late one night in 2004 at the Falcon Ridge Folk Festival. MacAllister, Gardner, and Carolann Solebello, three solo singer-songwriters, were the last ones left at a song circle. They liked the way they sounded together and decided to form a band. The name Red Molly is taken from a character in the Richard Thompson song "1952 Vincent Black Lightning".

Their career started to take off in 2006. They were the top vote getters in the 2006 Falcon Ridge Folk Festival Emerging Artist Showcase. WUMB in Boston named them Top New Artist of the Year and picked their Album Never Been to Vegas as one of their Top Albums of 2006. In 2007, they toured with Pat Wictor and Ellis, the other winners of the Falcon Ridge Emerging Artist showcase, on the Falcon Ridge Preview tour and performed with them in the Most Wanted Song Swap at the Festival itself.

Their album Love and Other Tragedies reached number 15 on the Americana Charts on June 30, 2008. James reached number 4 on the same chart in May 2010. In 2010, Carolann Solebello left the group "to spend more time with family and pursue solo opportunities" and was replaced by Molly Venter. Molly Venter's debut with the trio was on August 6, 2010, at the Lunenburg Folk Festival. Light in the Sky was released in 2011.

On March 26, 2015, Red Molly announced that the band would take an extended hiatus after the conclusion of the 2015 tour. The band members have since pursued solo projects. They re-formed for a tour in 2017.

== Discography ==
=== Albums ===
Studio albums

Year	Album	Peak positions	Certification
Year	Album	DEN	Certification
2008	Love and Other Tragedies	–	
2010	James	–	
2011	Light in the Sky	–	
2011	Red Molly	40	
2014	The Red Album	–	

Live albums

- 2006: Never Been To Vegas Live Album

=== EPs ===
- 2005: Red Molly (4 song EP)
- 2018: One for All & All for One (6 song EP)
