= This Is Absolutely Real =

This Is Absolutely Real: Visions and Versions of Phil Ochs

Studio album by Pat Wictor
- Released: 2017
- Genre: Folk
- Label: RiskyDisc Records
- Producer: Pat Wictor

This Is Absolutely Real: Visions and Versions of Phil Ochs is a cover album by American blues and folk musician Pat Wictor. The songs included were all written by US singer-songwriter Phil Ochs. It was released in 2017 on Wictor's independent label, RiskyDisc Records.

In Sing Out!, Ron Olesko described This Is Absolutely Real as a "welcome collection" that "celebrates two outstanding voices—the iconic Phil Ochs as well as contemporary folk music's standard-bearer, Pat Wictor." He wrote that it would have been easy to choose a group of well-known songs by Ochs, but instead "Pat took a different—and ultimately a more relevant approach" by covering songs that are not as well known. Wictor's song selection and his recordings, Olesko wrote, "show the beautiful poetry that embodied the work of Phil Ochs. ... By choosing these deeper tracks from Phil Ochs song book, Pat reveals both the beauty and depth of Ochs' artistic achievements while adding to his own impressive accomplishments as a creative musician."

The nine songs on This Is Absolutely Real include some that were recorded professionally and released by Ochs and others, such as "First Snow" and "I'm Tired", that were recorded as demos and released after his 1976 death.

== Track listing ==
All tracks are written by Phil Ochs, unless otherwise noted

No.	Title	Length
1.	"The Scorpion Departs" (originally titled "The Scorpion Departs But Never Returns")	4:20
2.	"There but for Fortune"	4:22
3.	"Lincoln Park" (originally titled "William Butler Yeats Visits Lincoln Park and Escapes Unscathed")	4:27
4.	"Knock on the Door"	5:35
5.	"First Snow"	2:55
6.	"City Boy"	4:35
7.	"I'm Tired"	2:22
8.	"Celia"	4:02
9.	"The Trial"	2:51

== Personnel ==
- Pat Wictor – vocals, slide guitar, acoustic guitar, electric guitars

=== Additional personnel ===
- Harmony vocals: Gretchen Schultz
- Bass: Chico Huff, Ken Pendergast, Mark Murphy
- Drums/Percussion: Cheryl Prashker, Matt Scarano
- Harmonica: Bob Beach
- Vibraphone: Behn Gillece
- Marimba: Carolyn Stallard

=== Production ===
- Produced by Pat Wictor
- Mixed and mastered by Glenn Barratt, Morningstar Studios, East Norriton, Pennsylvania
- Recorded by Glenn Barratt and Dave Schonauer, Morningstar Studios
- Additional recording:
  - by Ross Bonadonna at Wombat Recording Co., Brooklyn, New York, and
  - by Todd Giudice at Roots Cellar, Newburgh, New York
