= True North Gallery =

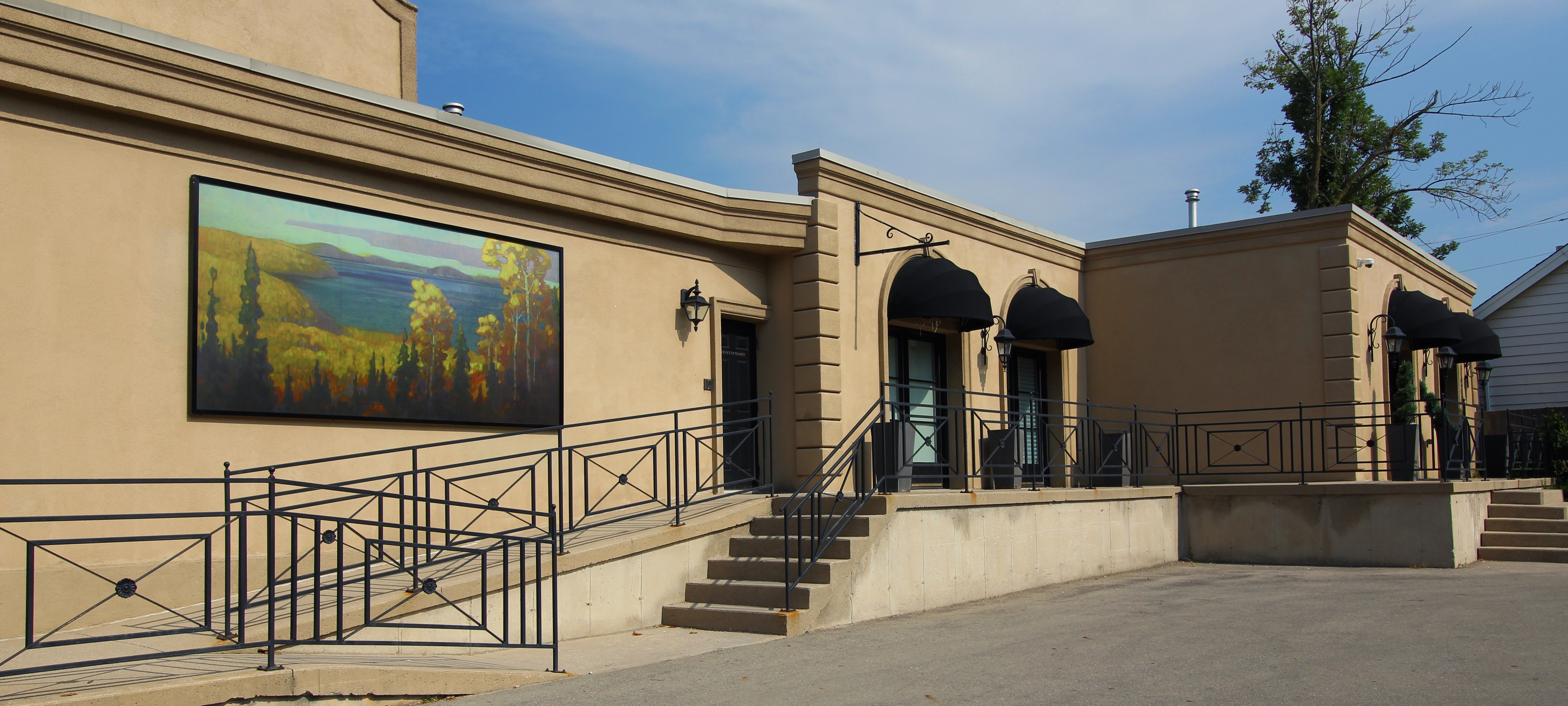
- True North Gallery in Waterdown

- Location of True North Gallery in Waterdown, Ontario
- Established: 2016
- Location: 23 Griffin Street; Waterdown, Ontario, Canada
- Coordinates: 43.333495°N 79.891177°W
- Type: Art gallery
- Presidents: Geoff & Brooke Kulawick
- Website: truenorth.gallery

True North Gallery (also known as The Music Gallery of Fine Art), founded in 2016 by Geoff and Brooke Kulawick, is an art museum and gallery in downtown Waterdown, Ontario, Canada. Dedicated to showcasing visual art by professional musicians, it claims to be the only art gallery of its kind. It is located at the head office of True North Records and Linus Entertainment. The gallery is privately owned and offers free admission.

== History ==
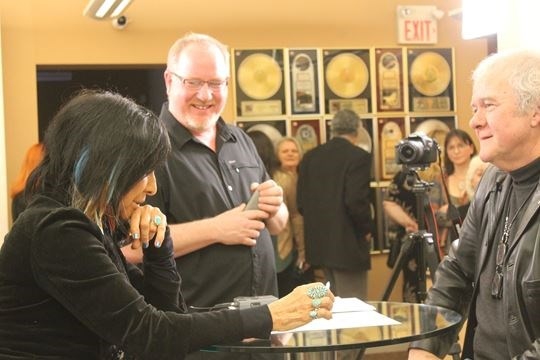
From left to right: Buffy Sainte-Marie, Geoff Kulawick, and Murray McLauchlan chat at the grand opening of True North Gallery in Waterdown, Ontario

In 2015—seven years after purchasing True North Records from its original owner, Bernie Finkelstein—Geoff Kulawick moved the label's head office from Burlington to Waterdown, Ontario. Kulawick credits his wife Mabruka (Brooke), a visual artist, with the idea to use the new space as a place to display artwork by professional musicians. Brooke noted that some True North Records signees including Buffy Sainte-Marie and Murray McLauchlan were visual artists. Of the concept, Kulawick claimed, "The more research I did, the more it sounded like something brilliant that nobody else is doing."

The gallery has hosted open house events featuring musicians/artists, including Buffy Sainte-Marie and Murray McLauchlan (at the grand opening in March 2016), Greg Smith and Jon Langford (May 2016), Louie Pérez (January 2017), and Joe Crookston (January 2018).

While pieces such as limited-edition prints by John Lennon and a charcoal self-portrait by David Bowie remain part of the Kulawicks' private collection, many originals are on consignment from the artists.

== See also ==
- Waterdown, Ontario
- True North Records
- Linus Entertainment
