= David M. Bailey =

American singer-songwriter (1966–2010)

- Genres: Folk, rock, contemporary Christian music, acoustic
- Years active: 1996–2010
- Website: www.davidmbailey.com

David M. Bailey (February 26, 1966 – October 2, 2010) was an American singer-songwriter. He released over 20 albums between 1997 and 2010, primarily playing acoustic folk.

== Biography ==
Bailey was the son of Presbyterian missionaries and was raised, primarily, in Beirut, Lebanon. He spent the last two years of his high school education in southern Germany, where he was prolific in his songwriting and performing. Upon returning to the United States, he attended Grove City College; he then married Leslie McGarvey. He was diagnosed with a Glioblastoma Multiforme IV (GBM 4) brain tumor that was to have killed him in six months. He quit his job and returned to his love of songwriting and performing. He toured and performed for a few years in the duo Not by Chance, along with guitarist, vocalist and songwriter Douglas Ebert. The duo eventually dissolved and Bailey toured solo from then on. In 2003, he was a "New Folk Finalist" at the Kerrville New Folk Competition at the Kerrville Folk Festival. In late 2008, Bailey was diagnosed with a recurrence of glioblastoma. On November 20, 2008, Bailey had surgery to remove a cyst and new tumor. His trials with the initial occurrence of glioblastoma, and the initial recurrence in 2008, were discussed in Sanjay Gupta's book Cheating Death. On October 2, 2010, Bailey died of brain cancer following a month-long surge during which he was able to visit with family and friends from across the United States.

David performed and provided workshops for Christian and cancer conferences nationally and around the world.

== Discography ==
- Watermarked
- All That Matters
- Bittersweet
- Coffee with the Angels
- Comfort
- Faith
- Hope, the Anthology
- Life
- Live
- Lost and Found
- Love the Time
- One More Day
- Peace
- Rusty Brick Road
- Silent Conversation
- Two to See
- Some Quiet Night
- Home By Another Way
- Notes
- Love – Still The Greatest

== DVD release ==
- Living
