= Nicolette Good =

American singer-songwriter

Nicolette Good is an American singer-songwriter based in San Antonio, Texas. Good was featured on Season 1 of the documentary television series Troubadour, TX. In 2012, she won the Kerrville Folk Festival Grassy Hill New Folk Competition as well as the Wildflower! Arts and Music Festival Performing Songwriter Contest. Good released Monarch, her debut full-length album, in July 2012. Her sophomore full-length, Little Boat on a Wave, was released in 2015.

== Discography ==
2015: Little Boat on a Wave
2012: Monarch — ASIN: B008S3L69A
2011: Nicolette Good (EP) — ASIN: B004P8I1UO
