= Aiden James =

American singer (born 1982)

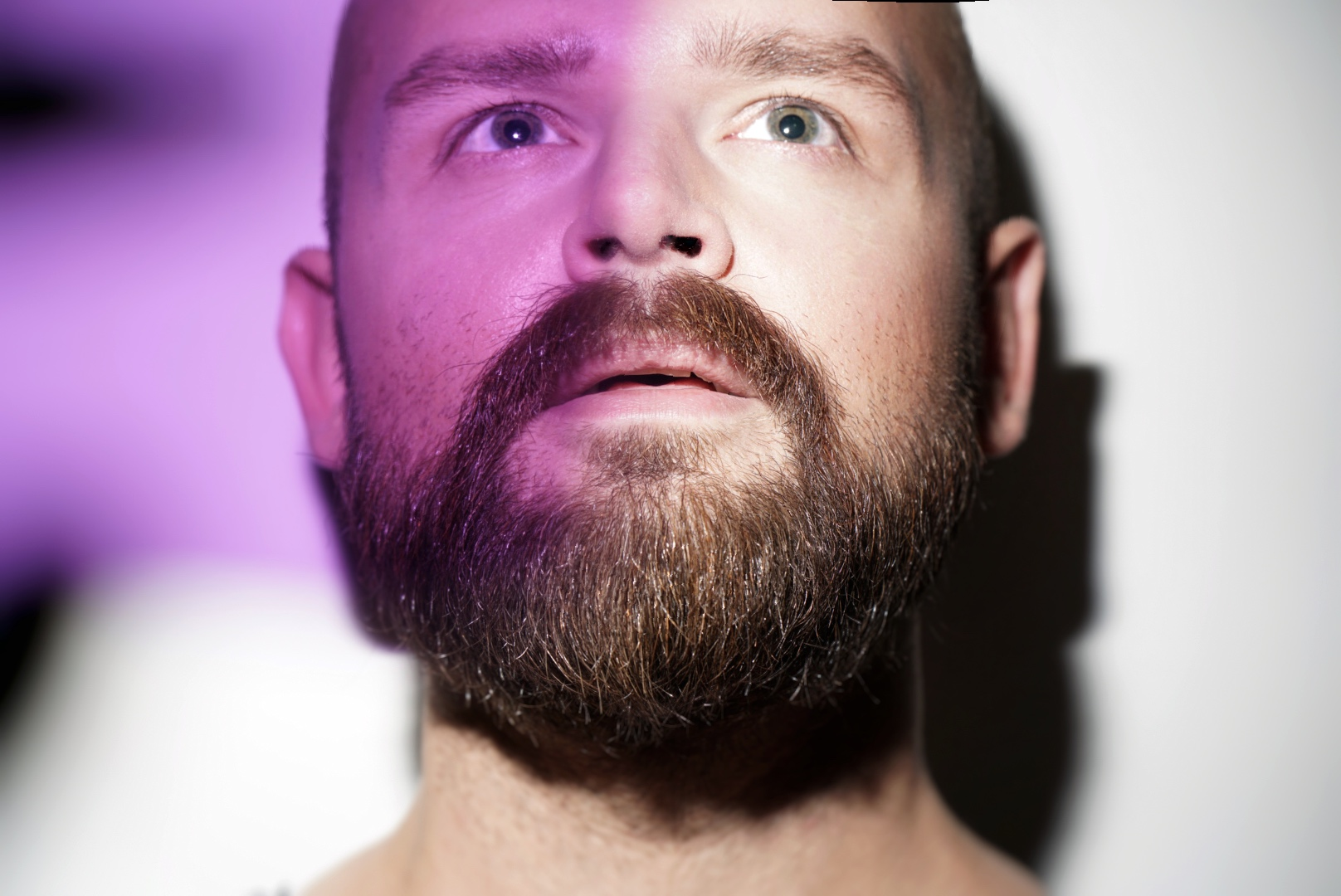

Background information
- Born: August 9, 1982 (age 44); Philadelphia, Pennsylvania
- Genre: Pop
- Occupations: singer, songwriter, producer
- Instruments: Guitar, vocals, piano, synthesizer
- Years active: 2004–present
- Label: Songster Sounds
- Website: aidenjamesmusic.com

Aiden James (born August 9, 1982) is an American pop singer, songwriter, musician, and producer. He has released two albums and seven singles to date. James has toured the United States primarily as a solo performer and as an opening act for Matt Morris, Shawn Colvin and Andy Bell.

== Early life ==
He was born on August 9, 1982, in Philadelphia, Pennsylvania. He grew up in the foster care system and does not know his mother and father. He started playing the piano at age 4, and started to sing at age 6. He started performing in children's choirs and small theatre productions. He has told the press that his first musical memory was trying to play Richard Marx's "Right Here Waiting" on a toy keyboard at the age of four or five.

== Career ==
In 2008, James released his debut album On the Run. His video for the album's title track received airplay on both MTV and Logo, expanding his audience beyond Philadelphia. Over the next few years, he supported the album by touring extensively, including an appearance at the Falcon Ridge Folk Festival in 2010, a live performance on SiriusXM, and a tour with singer-songwriter Christopher Dallman which included performances in Philadelphia, New York City, Boston, Portland, Seattle, San Francisco, Los Angeles and San Diego.

In 2011, he released the single "Best Shot" to iTunes as an advance preview of his forthcoming album Trouble with This. The album, supported largely through crowdfunding, followed in 2012, and was supported by a video for the single "Hurry Hurry". A house music remix of "Hurry Hurry" by Radboy was also released.

Later in 2012, he also released a non-album cover of Whitney Houston's song "I Wanna Dance With Somebody".

In 2013, his live performances included a show with Matt Morris in Denver, Colorado, performances at the Viva la Vida Festival in Pioneer, California, and the Folsom Street Fair in San Francisco, and a headlining spot at Pride Northwest in Portland, Oregon.

In 2014, James released the single "Last Reminder", which was cowritten with Morris, and performed at the Castro Street Fair in San Francisco.

In 2015, he was invited to be one of the last artists to play a show at The Living Room in Brooklyn before that venue's closure.

On September 18, 2017, James released the pop single "Colorblind".

== Personal life ==
James, who is vegan and openly gay, supports organizations including PAWS, a non-profit organization based in Philadelphia dedicated to saving homeless, abandoned and unwanted animals.
