= Jack Harris (singer-songwriter) =

- Born: 1986 (age 39–40); Builth Wells, Powys, Wales
- Genres: Irish folk, folk, blues, country, gospel
- Instruments: Vocals, guitar
- Years active: 2004–present
- Website: jackharrismusic.com

Jack Harris (born 20 April 1986) is a Welsh-born folk singer-songwriter, musician, and poet. He won the 2005 New Folk Songwriting Competition at Kerrville Folk Festival in Texas, the first non-American to do so. Harris has been described as "a priest of song" by singer Anaïs Mitchell.

He has released three albums. His second album, The Flame and the Pelican, featured at number six in the July 2011 EuroAmericanaChart.

He has made several appearances at the Green Man Festival, and opened for such folk musicians as Martin Simpson, Tracy Grammer, Dick Gaughan, Martin Carthy, and Dave Swarbrick.
