= Johnsmith =

American singer-songwriter

- Born: John Joseph Smith; 1951 (age 73–74)
- Occupation: Singer-songwriter
- Website: www.johnsmithmusic.com

John Joseph Smith (born 1951), known professionally as Johnsmith, is an American folk music singer-songwriter from DeWitt, Iowa.

== Awards and recognition ==
In 1990 Johnsmith won the New Folk Songwriting Contest at the Kerrville Folk Festival. In January 2011, he was nominated for the 10th Annual Independent Music Awards in the Blues category for his song "Jay Bird". Johnsmith has won the Great Lakes Songwriting Contest, entering with song "From My Window".

== Discography ==
- Hole in the Clouds (1998)
- To the Four Directions (2000)
- Traveler (2002)
- Kickin' This Stone (2004)
- The Longing Road (2014)
- Break Me Open (2006)
- Gravity of Grace (2009)
- Ginkgo (2017)
- Backroads (2022)
