= Cosy Sheridan =

American folk singer/songwriter (born 1964)

Cosy Sheridan (born December 11, 1964, in Concord, New Hampshire) is an American folk singer/songwriter. She first caught the attention of national folk audiences in 1992 when she won the songwriting contests at both the Kerrville Folk Festival and the Telluride Bluegrass Festival. Sheridan graduated from Phillips Exeter Academy and now lives in New Hampshire again, with her husband, Charlie Koch.

When she released her critically acclaimed CD Quietly Led on Waterbug Records, The Boston Globe wrote “She is now being called one of the best new singer/songwriters.”

She has been on the road ever since playing clubs, concert halls and coffeehouses from Seattle to Berkeley and across I-80 to Omaha, Chicago and then to Boston where she now makes her home. She has played houseconcerts in Iowa and to a full house at Carnegie Hall. On her new CD she writes of these years on the road in the song Woody Guthrie Watch Over Me.

Her 2014 release, Pretty Bird, was chosen as one of Sing Out Magazine's "Great CDs of 2014.” West Side Folk dubbed her “one of the era’s finest and most thoughtful songwriters.”

Her concerts are wide-ranging explorations: love songs for adults and practical philosophy for a complicated world. She has written about the stock market crash of 2008 and fall-out from uranium mining in the American southwest. She has re-written greek myths: Persephone runs away with Hades the biker. And then there are her signature parodies on aging and women. Her lyrical dexterity is backed by her distinctive percussive guitar style.

For the past 20 years she has taught classes in songwriting, performance and guitar at workshops and adult music camps across the country at such camps as the Puget Sound Guitar Workshop and The Swannanoa Gathering. In 2008 she co-founded the Moab Folk Camp in Moab Utah.

Her songs cover political topics such as AIDS, prostitution, women's body image, and environmentalism, as well as tending toward the humorous: her songs Turboyeast, about vaginal yeast infections, and The True and Terrible Trials of Waldo the Dog, about a dog's loss of its testicles, was featured on the Dr. Demento radio program.

Most Tuesday mornings, at 10:30am (Eastern Time), she and Charlie share songs on Facebook & YouTube.

== Discography ==
- Quietly Led (1990)
- Late Bloomer (1992)
- Saturn Return (1994)
- One Sure Thing - Live (1996)
- Grand Design (1999)
- Ant Hymn (2003)
- Botox Tango (2003) (a collection of Sheridan's satirical songs with new songs added)
- The Pomegranate Seed (2004)
- Live at Cedarhouse (2006)
- Eros (2008)
- The Horse King (2011)
- Pretty Bird (2014)
- Sometimes I Feel Too Much (2017)
- My Fence & My Neighbor (2018)
- A Beautiful Sound (2021)
