= Tom Prasada-Rao =

American folk singer (died 2024)

Tom Prasada-Rao (1957/1958 – June 19, 2024) was an American folk singer. He won the 1993 Kerrville Folk Festival competition. The following year, he released the album "The Way of the World". Several decades later, he wrote the song "$20 Bill", about the murder of George Floyd. Prasada-Rao died on June 19, 2024, at the age of 66.

Prasada-Rao also had several musical collaborations, including the trio "The Sherpas" in the 1990s (with Mike Lille and Tom Kimmel), and the duo "The Dreamsicles" with Cary Cooper in the early 2000s.
