= Raina Rose =

American singer-songwriter (born 1982)

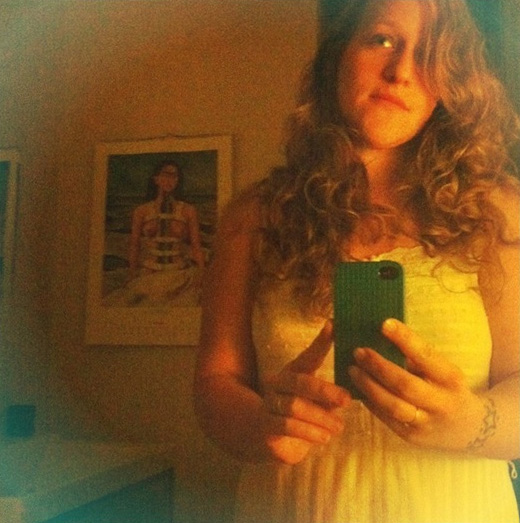
- Rose in 2013

Background information
- Born: Raina Rose Klein McClellan; February 3, 1982 (age 44); Los Angeles, CA
- Genres: Folk, Americana
- Occupations: Vocalist, guitarist, musician, singer-songwriter, harmony vocalist
- Years active: 2001–present
- Label: Constant Clip
- Website: rainarose.com

Raina Rose (born February 3, 1982) is an American folk singer-songwriter from Portland, Oregon, who now lives in Austin, Texas.

She has been on a national tour circuit since October 2005. She was a finalist in the 2007 Kerrville Folk Festival new folk competition, received honorable mention in the 2006 Telluride Bluegrass Festival Troubadour competition and has been featured at the High Sierra Music Festival 2006, 2007, and 2009.

Her debut solo album, Despite the Crushing Weight of Gravity (released in 2005), was produced by Jim Brunberg at Mississippi Studios. Her second album, The Prophet, The Panhandler and The Moon, came out in February 2007 on 1% For The Planet, Threepin Records.

Her third album, End of Endless False Starts was produced by John Elliott and was released in 2009.

Rose's fourth full-length album, called When May Came, was released in early 2010. It was largely self-produced, with assistance from bassist Andrew Pressman and engineer Stephen Orsak. It features members of the band Some Say Leland, from Austin, TX. It was recorded mostly live in a small house in South Austin over four days in September 2009. The album was released on Constant Clip Records.

Her fifth album Caldera was produced by Andrew Pressman and was released in 2012. Her song 'Secret', from this album, was chosen as song of the day by radio station KUTX in June 2013.

Her sixth studio album Vesta was produced by Jt Nero and released in February of 2020.

Rose is also the CEO of Folk Potions, an herbal infused skincare company she founded in 2016.

"Portland native Raina Rose is everything a young female folksinger should be. If occasionally a touch too naive or overreaching in her eagerness to express a surfeit of emotion, she's always so sincere, sweet and disarmingly goofy and such a heckuva singer that one instantly forgives such transgressions with a grin. From her late duo the Gypsy Moths to her latest and best-yet CD, The Prophet, the Panhandler, and the Moon, her vocal, guitar and songwriting chops continue to flourish. Next week, she heads to Texas' Kerrville Folk Festival as a finalist in their renowned New Folk contest." Jeff Rosenberg – Willamette Week, May 2007
