= Jay Mankita =

American singer-songwriter

Jay Mankita is an American singer-songwriter, guitarist, activist, and maker/educator. He is often described as a folk singer. His original songs are often humorous and can be pointed politically, as in his 2004 release "They Lied", which is critical of the George W. Bush administration with regard to the Iraq War.

Mankita has recorded several albums, including Dogs Are Watching Us and Morning Face. He has also recorded music for children such as the song "Eat Like a Rainbow" on Picnic Playground and "Junk Food Man" on the Grammy-nominated Healthy Food for Thought: Good Enough to Eat. As a live performer, he has led sing-alongs such as "The 12 Days of Recess" with John Hughes, and "The Day the School Went Wild" which he performed on tour over 500 times between 1997 and 2005.

Much of his repertoire focuses on the environment and peace-and-justice issues. As an environmental activist, he converted his diesel 2003 Volkswagen Jetta to run on biodiesel fuel and vegetable oil. Since 2015, Mankita has been active in presenting his traveling "makerspace" programs at schools, libraries, camps, and other gatherings through his company Playful Engineers.
