= Not by Chance (band) =

American acoustic band

Not By Chance
- Origin: Stafford, Virginia
- Genres: Folk, rock, Contemporary Christian Music Acoustic
- Years active: 1996–1998
- Past members: David M. Bailey; Douglas Ebert

Not By Chance were an American acoustic band, formed in Stafford, Virginia, in 1996, after David M. Bailey was diagnosed with a Glioblastoma brain tumor and given six months to live. For the next two years they would play primarily Christian music, with Bailey's experience as a cancer survivor strongly influencing their lyrics and message.

== History ==
=== David Bailey ===
Bailey (1966–2010) was raised in Beirut, Lebanon, the son of Presbyterian missionaries. He spent some of his youth in Germany where he learned to play the guitar, and attended Grove City College in the United States. Bailey married and began work in data entry. Upon being diagnosed with a Glioblastoma brain tumor in 1996, which was to have killed him in six months, Bailey quit his job to concentrate on songwriting and touring. Recording over 20 cds with performances in 21 countries and 45 U.S. states, bailey led a vigorous schedule for the 14 years after diagnosis. He performed in a wide variety of venues including churches, cancer celebration days, support groups, patient/ caregiver groups, conferences, retreats, & corporate events. In May 2003, he won the prestigious Kerrville NewFolk songwriting competition and shared the stage with many others. From Beirut to Budapest, from Pittsburgh to Portland, and on hundreds of stages in between, he inspired and entertained thousands of listeners and maintained a relentless tour schedule year round. In Nov 2008, david's tumor returned. He underwent surgeries and chemotherapy while still maintaining his tour schedule. He had more surgery in the late spring of 2010 and still made a final tour in July 2010. david died on October 2, 2010, fighting to the very end with his tenacious hope, 14 years and 3 months post diagnosis.

=== Douglas Ebert ===
Born and raised in West Virginia, Douglas Ebert (b. 1963) is a self-taught guitar player. He attended West Virginia University for two years, but dropped out to move to Fairfax, Virginia with his young wife and child. Like his partner, Ebert left the corporate sector in exchange for a guitar and a touring schedule.

In 1996, as Bailey struggled to come to terms with his terminal diagnosis, he teamed up with friend and fellow church-goer Ebert. The two performed at local churches, among other venues including a prison. In a short amount of time, their combined talents provided enough material for a first album, Second Chance.

When it became clear that Bailey's treatments were working, news of his inspirational story spread across the nation. The band's touring schedule exploded; "48 Hours" producers did a short segment on David, and in 1997 the band sang the national anthem at a Pittsburgh Pirates game, splitting the bill with fellow cancer survivor Sue Sarver. While touring in California the duo assembled material for a second album, Vista Point.

=== Breakup: 1998 ===
In 1997, Bailey released Peace, his first solo album. The decision came after creative differences began to drive Ebert and Bailey apart, with Ebert quitting in the following year to support his three growing children. Since then, Bailey, who never left the business, has recorded eighteen albums, occasionally drawing on material written during Not By Chance.

On November 20, 2008, Bailey had surgery to remove a cyst and new tumor. As he did twelve years before, he toured between treatments. He lived in Earlysville, Virginia until his death in 2010.

Ebert resides in Fredericksburg, Virginia. 2009 marked his emergence back into music, collaborating with high-school friend Kathy Fisher.

== Albums ==
- Second Chance
- Vista Point
