= Tom Kimmel =

American singer-songwriter (born 1953)

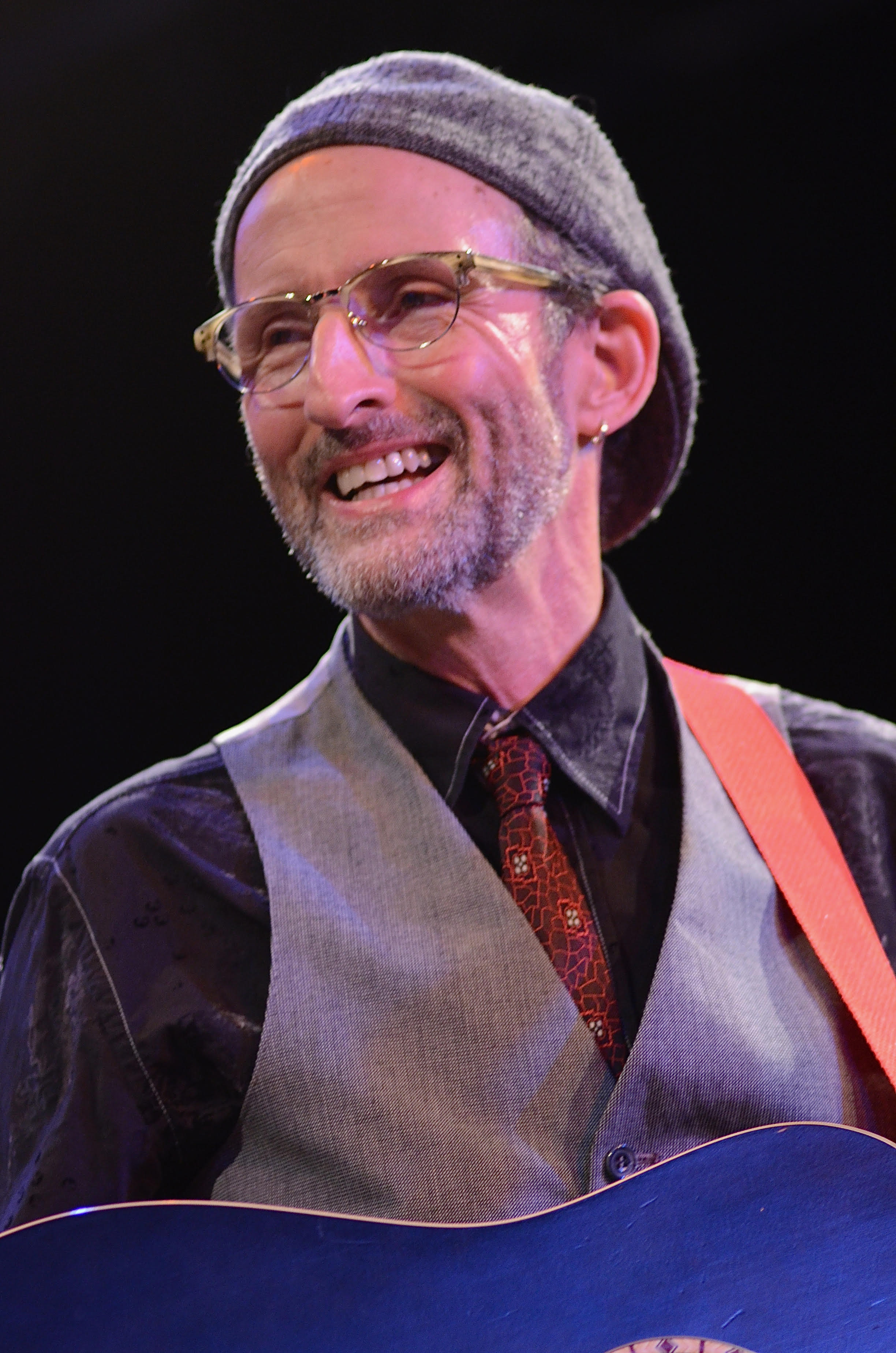
Headshot

Tom Kimmel (born Thomas Eugene Hobbs II in 1953) is an American singer-songwriter and poet.

== Biography ==
Born in Memphis, Tennessee, Kimmel grew up largely in small towns in south Alabama. He attended public schools and graduated from the University of Alabama in 1975.

Kimmel is known as a songwriter, and his compositions have been recorded by many popular artists, including Johnny Cash, Waylon Jennings, Linda Ronstadt, Joe Cocker and Randy Travis. His songs have also been featured in television series including Miami Vice, Touched by an Angel and Dawson's Creek — and in films including Twins, Runaway Bride and Serendipity.

"That's Freedom", the lead track on his 5 to 1 album, was co-written by Kimmel and reached #64 on the Billboard Hot 100 in July 1987 The song was later covered by Australian singer John Farnham, reaching #6 in the Australian charts in late 1990 and going Gold there, as well as charting well in parts of Europe.

He usually tours as a solo performer, and occasionally tours with The Sherpas, a trio he formed in 1994 with Michael Lille and Tom Prasada-Rao. A new trio, The New Agrarians, was recently formed with Pierce Pettis and Kate Campbell. He also sings sporadically with songwriters Don Henry and Sally Barris, collectively called The Waymores.

He frequently teaches songwriting and creative expression at retreats and workshops, and in 2006, he published his first book of poems. He currently resides in Memphis, Tennessee.

== Discography ==
- 1987 – 5 to 1 No. 104 US
- 1990 – Circle Back Home
- 1993 – Don’t Look Back
- 1994 – Bones
- 1999 – Short Stories
- 2002 – Shallow Water
- 2003 – Honor Among Thieves (with The Sherpas)
- 2004 – Light of Day

== Bibliography ==
- 2006 – The Sweetest and the Meanest (book)
- 2008 – The Sweetest and the Meanest
