= SongwritingWith:Soldiers =

- Formation: 2012
- Type: 501(c)(3) nonprofit organization
- Purpose: Pairing veterans and active-duty service members with professional songwriters in retreat settings
- Region served: United States
- Website: https://songwritingwithsoldiers.org/

SongwritingWith:Soldiers (SW:S) is a 501(c)(3) non-profit organization that pairs veterans and active-duty service members with professional songwriters in retreat settings to craft songs about combat and the return home.

== History ==
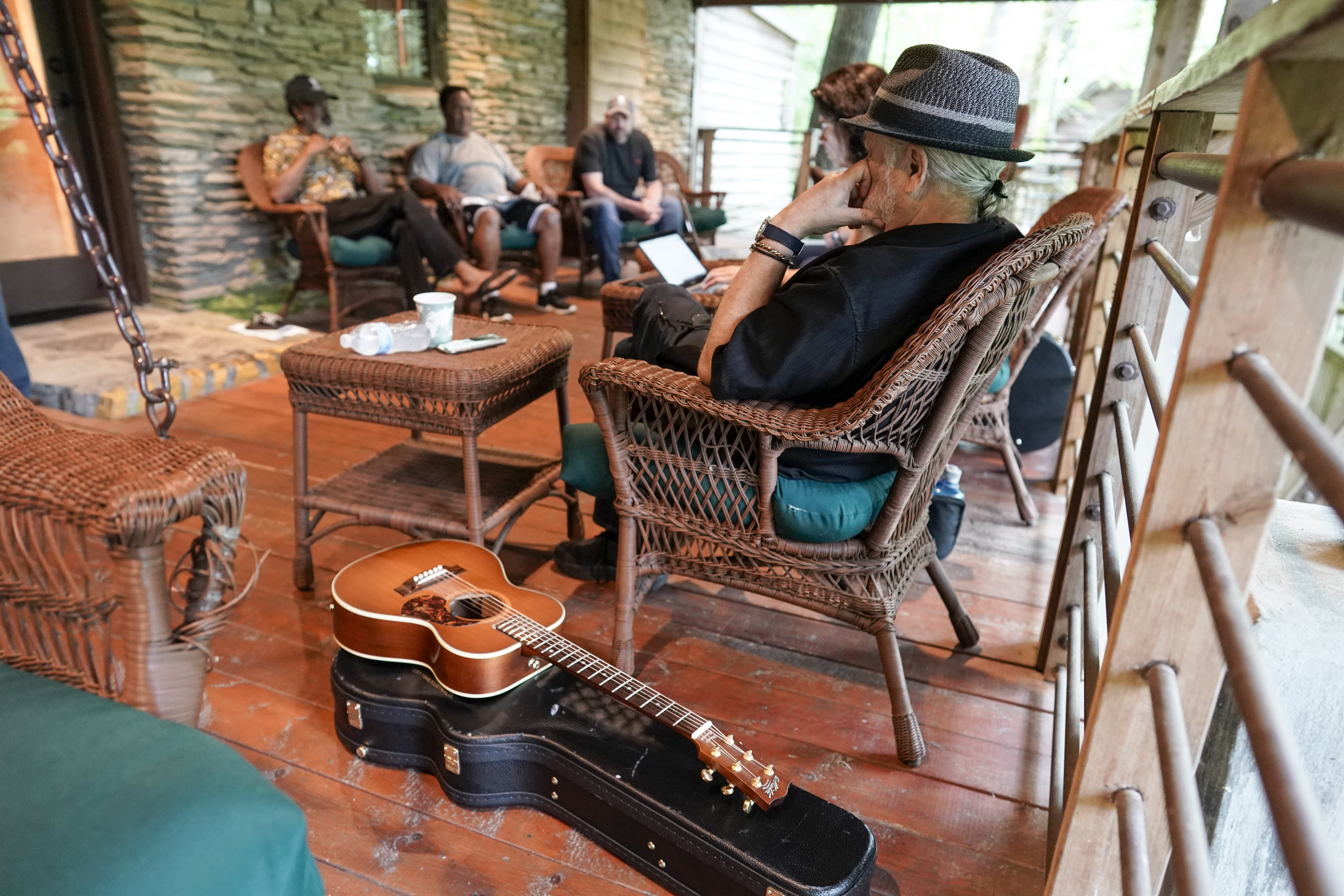
Songwriters with a group of soldiers (Photo: Ed Rode)

In 2008, Austin-based singer/songwriter Darden Smith performed at the Landstuhl Regional Medical Center in Germany for American soldiers injured in Iraq and Afghanistan. After returning home, he met with members of the Texas National Guard and learned about Angel Flights, a program in which pilots fly fallen service members home to the United States. Smith contacted a longtime friend, singer-songwriter Radney Foster, and together they wrote a song called "Angel Flight," which Foster recorded on his CD Revival (2009). Smith was invited to write with veterans for LifeQuest Transitions, a group that helped wounded veterans with their transition to civilian life. Mary Judd, a writer and developer of special programs, accompanied him on this visit with the intention of writing an article. When the two saw the impact of collaborative songwriting on the veterans, Judd began developing the full retreat programming around the songwriting sessions. SongwritingWith:Soldiers officially launched in 2012.

== Programs ==
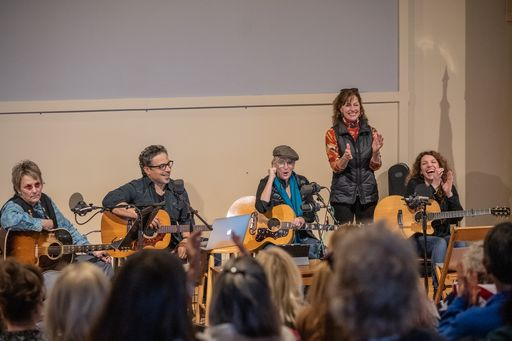
(L-R) Mary Gauthier, Jay Clementi, Terry Radigan, Mary Judd, and Georgia Middleman present the final concert of songs written over the weekend to a group of female veterans. (Photo: Bryan Lasky)

Since its founding in 2012, SW:S has held more than 50 retreats and workshops at locations across the U.S., including Arizona, Arkansas, California, Colorado, Florida, Georgia, Maine, Montana, New York, South Carolina, Texas, Virginia, and Washington - serving more than 700 attendees, expanding to 2-3 family members and subsequently to 3-5 peers, impacting thousands of community members.

At these events, veterans and service members sit down with songwriters, share stories, and write songs. The process fosters trust, creativity, and healing. "Many of the soldiers said they shared personal stories with the musicians that they had discussed only with their wife or husband - if at all."

On the final day of workshops and retreats, the new songs are performed by the musicians and professionally recorded. Songs are registered with the American Society of Composers, Authors, and Publishers (ASCAP) with veterans as co-writers of their songs and they have ownership of their creative work. SW:S has expanded to include songwriting retreats for military families, military couples, and Gold Star families.

== Partners ==
The SW:S program is supported by grants and donations. Key funding partners have included: ASCAP Foundation; Boulder Crest Foundation; Bob Woodruff Foundation; Mayerson Foundation; Mid-America Arts Alliance; NAMM Foundation; Veterans United Foundation, and the USO. Photographers Michael O'Brien, Bryan Laskey, Rick Loomis, Stacey Pearsall, and Ed Rode have taken portraits of veterans and songwriters at a series of retreats. Videographer and veteran James Monk, Mercy Lamp Productions, has filmed many of the retreats.
