= Mark Elliott (musician) =

Mark Elliott is a songwriter, author and guitarist whose career started in Washington, D.C., and later took him to Nashville. As a songwriter Elliott has penned hits which reached the Billboard Top Forty charts, notably "Every Man for Himself" for Neal McCoy (US Country No. 37, 2000). As an author, Mark is represented by Brandt & Hochman Literary Agents, Inc. New York, New York, and has released his debut coming of age memoir, entitled, "The Sons of Starmount: Memoir of a Ten-Year-Old Boy" on Valentine's Day 2019. The companion album to the book, featuring all original songs produced in the style of the 1970s (the era of the story) is also available.

== Early Career and Work as a Songwriter ==
As a teenager, Elliott immersed himself in the vibrant bluegrass and folk music scene of Washington, D.C. One of his earliest guitar teachers and mentors was Phil Rosenthal, from the famed bluegrass band, The Seldom Scene. A debut album (Common Ground, 1988) and a last minute opening act for Tom Paxton lit the fire of the young writer, leading him to Nashville and a publishing deal with Cherry Lane Music.

Elliott went on to staff writing positions with major publishing companies including, Bluewater Music Group, Maypop Music Group (owned by the super-group Alabama) as well as Sony Music Publishing. Elliott's songs have been recorded by independent and major artists, receiving airplay on radio and TV in the United States and abroad. His songs have hit the Billboard Top Forty charts, notably the hit single by Neal McCoy, Every Man for Himself which Billboard magazine called "a song with rare lyrical and musical edge and the best cut on the album." The late Rodeo and Recording star Chris LeDoux also recorded one of Mark's songs ""Making Ends Meet"" on his Capitol Records ""Whatcha Gonna Do With A Cowboy"" release.

Buoyed by wins in singer-songwriter contests at major festivals across the country Elliott began to build a reputation for standout live performances. However, it was winning the Kerrville New Folk Award in 1993 that really put him on the map and on the road. As one-half of the duo Culley & Elliott, he toured extensively in support of their acclaimed CD, Flight of Dreams (1993).

== Solo career ==
=== Common Ground ===
Mark's debut solo album, Common Ground on the West Texas East label was recorded in the Washington, DC suburbs and released in 1988. It was Common Ground that first attracted he attention of the legendary Tom Paxton and ultimately lead to Mark's move to Nashville, TN in 1990.

=== My Great Escape ===
The year 2000 brought Elliott back to a solo career and a successful new CD, My Great Escape, featuring a duet with Tom Paxton (Stars in Their Eyes). Described as an easy blend of folk and country with pop and jazz, the album was an Americana Chart's top 70 CD and its songs were played on commercial and public radio programs across the United States and abroad. The song She Rode Horses reached #2 on the independent country chart, Inside Country. Sing Out! Magazine called it a "superb album" and Music Row Magazine said "almost too good" and "I'll bet he's a killer to hear live."

=== American Road ===
In 2004, the album American Road set out to capture characters, towns and stories from Elliott's well-traveled past. American Road attracted vocal collaborations from luminaries Don Henry (Grammy Award-winning songwriter) and Jonell Mosser (renowned vocalist who has sung with the likes of Bonnie Raitt, B.B. King and Ringo Starr). Elliott's US touring through 2005 continued to include high profile clubs and festivals, including an official showcase spot at the Falcon Ridge Folk Festival.

=== Pickin' Blackberries ===
In 2006 Elliott's road led back to his Folk and Bluegrass beginnings. The new CD, Pickin' Blackberries shares 12 new songs with some of the most respected names in acoustic music. Elliott's guitar and voice, coupled with the likes of IBMA winner Jim Hurst, National finger-picking champion Pete Huttlinger and Americana divas The McCrary Sisters, make for a strong and genuine delivery of captivating stories.

=== Cordell ===
In the summer of 2008 Mark was commissioned by the TN State Parks and the Friends of Cordell Hull State Park to write the song "Cordell" and produce a CD about the life and times of the famous TN statesman, Cordell Hull. That CD continues to be used in Tennessee schools as well as United Nations educational programs.

=== Good Life ===
In the fall of 2008 Elliott released his CD Good Life including a song by the late Chicago troubadour Tom Dundee as well as Wake-Up, written for Barack Obama's 2008 US presidential campaign and used in rallies and fundraisers in the last months of that campaign.

=== The Sons of Starmount - Companion EP Vol 1 ===
Released spring 2019 – This five-song EP of original songs written from the new Mark Elliott Memoir, The Sons of Starmount was produced and recorded as if it were released in 1977 (the year the story takes place.) Vol 1 represents the 70's singer-songwriter version of the companion EP.

== Recent Work – Runaway Home ==
Mark is now the vocalist of Nashville trio Runaway Home.

Mark Elliott and Runaway Home are endorsed by Elixir Strings and Taylor Guitars. He owns and manages the Cub Creek recording studio.
