= Charlotte Kendrick =

American folk musician

- Origin: Pawling, New York, United States
- Genres: Folk; Folk rock
- Years active: 2003 – Present
- Labels: Wondermore Records
- Website: www.charlottekendrick.com

Charlotte Kendrick is an American folk musician from Pawling, New York.

== Discography ==
- North of New York 2007
- Live at the Roger Smith 2004, with Dan Rowe
- I Get Stupid 2003, Re-released 2006
