= Amy Speace =

American singer-songwriter

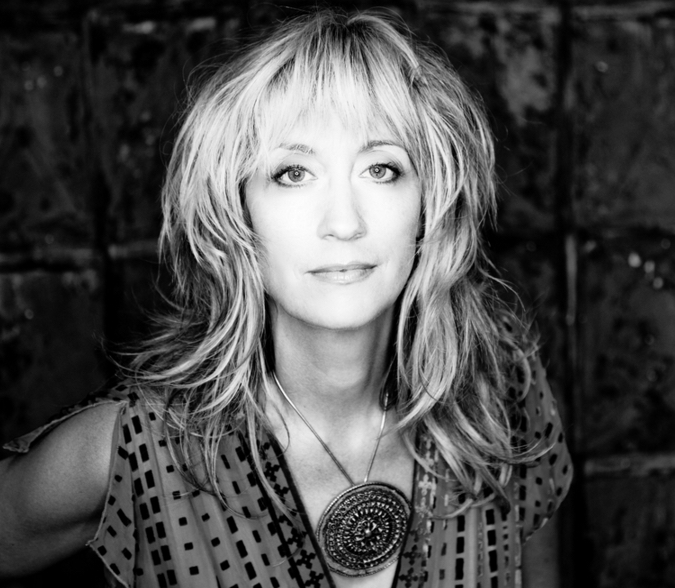
- Speace c. 2013

Background information
- Born: Amy Speace
- Origin: Baltimore, Maryland, United States
- Genres: Folk, Americana
- Occupations: Singer, songwriter
- Instruments: Vocals, Guitar
- Years active: 2006–present
- Labels: Wildflower (2006–10), Thirty Tigers (2011-13), Gearbox (Applewood Road), Proper Group
- Website: Amy Speace website

Amy Speace is a Nashville-based folk/Americana American singer-songwriter and essayist from Baltimore, Maryland.

== Career ==
National Public Radio described her voice as "velvety and achy" and compared her to Lucinda Williams. She lives in Nashville, Tennessee. A former Shakespearean actress, her music has received critical acclaim from The New York Times, NPR, The Sunday London Times, Mojo Magazine, etc. Speace's song, Weight of the World, was recorded by singer Judy Collins on her 2010 album Paradise. She has toured extensively in the US, UK and Europe and has shared the stage with Guy Clark, Judy Collins, Mary Chapin Carpenter and many others. She regularly performs at The Rocky Mountain Folks Festival and The Kerrville Folk Festival and has appeared at Glastonbury Music Festival, Cambridge Folk Festival. She has appeared on Mountain Stage Radio 4 times. Speace also works as a songwriter with the non-profit SongwritingWith:Soldiers which helps veterans process their trauma.

Speace contributed her cover of "House of Broken Dreams" in a Mark Heard tribute album entitled "Treasure Of The Broken Land: The Songs Of Mark Heard" (Storm Weathered Records) in 2017.

In 2020, Amy Speace was awarded "International Song of the Year" by the Americana Music Association for the title song on her recent album "Me and the Ghost of Charlemagne" {Proper Records}.

Speace released, "There Used To Be Horses Here" on January 29, 2021 on Proper Records, a record she coproduced with The Orphan Brigade (Ben Glover, Joshua Britt, Neilson Hubbard).

She has produced, RJ Cowdrey, Alicia Viani and Lyn Koonce with engineer Thomm Jutz. RJ Cowdrey's record, "What If This Is All There Is" spent a few weeks in the Top 10 of the Folk Radio Charts in 2019.

As an essayist, Amy Speace has been published in The New York Times, No Depression Magazine, American Songwriter Magazine and The Blue Rock Review.

== Discography ==
=== Studio albums ===
- Fable (2002)
- Songs For Bright Street (2006)
- The Killer In Me (2009)
- Land Like A Bird (2011)
- How To Sleep In A Stormy Boat (2013)
- That Kind Of Girl (2015)
- Applewood Road (2016)
- Me And The Ghost Of Charlemagne (2019)
- There Used To Be Horses Here (2021)
- Tucson (2022)
- The American Dream (2024)

=== EPs ===
- Into the New EP (2010)
- Same Old Storm EP (2014)
