= Falcon Ridge Folk Festival =

American folk music festival

Coordinates: 41.8246°N 73.2233°W

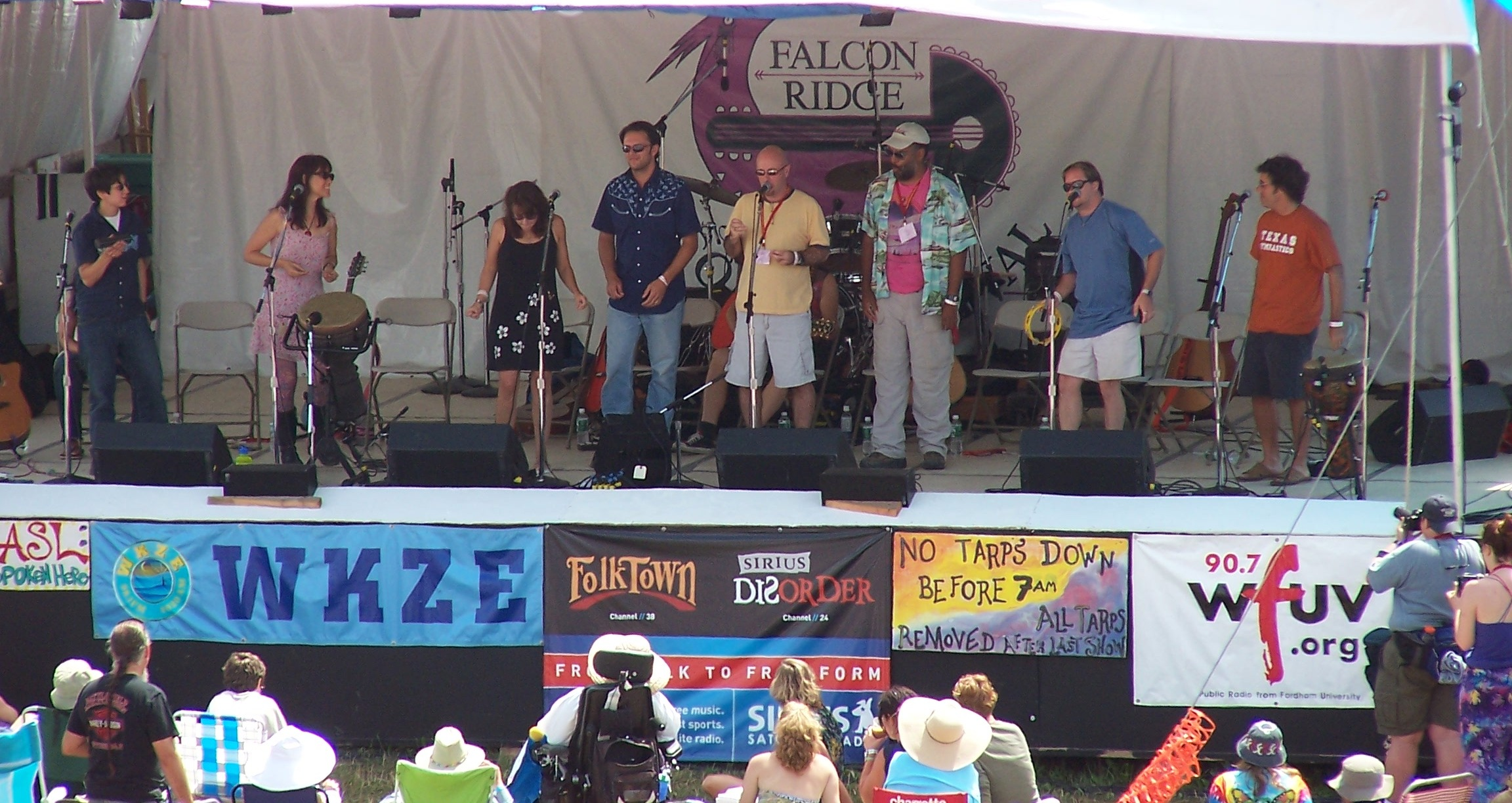
- Falcon Ridge Folk Festival Main Stage 2004
- Genre: Folk, Country, Blues, Folk rock, Americana
- Dates: First full weekend in August
- Locations: (United States) Hillsdale, New York & Goshen, Connecticut
- Years active: 1988-1990; 1992-present
- Website: falconridgefolk.com

The Falcon Ridge Folk Festival is an annual American folk-oriented music and dance festival currently held at the Fairgrounds in Goshen, Connecticut.

== History ==
The first festival was a two-day event in 1988, held at a ski slope. In 1991, the festival moved to Long Hill Farm, in Hillsdale, New York, where it was held until 2005. Falcon Ridge (as of the 2016 festival) took place at Dodds Farm, also in Hillsdale, 7 mi (11 km) from the previous location. As of 2021 Falcon Ridge moved to Goshen Fairgrounds in Connecticut.

== Current logistics ==
The festival is held during the last full weekend of July, currently from Friday to Sunday; camping is allowed on the premises with a camping ticket, and—counting both camping and non-camping patrons—festival attendance in past years has approached as much as 15,000 throughout the long weekend.

== Performers and stages ==
Though musical acts and styles generally vary in scope from older folk artists such as Arlo Guthrie, Richie Havens, and Janis Ian to up-and-coming acts from the fringes of folk and other genres from bluegrass (Crooked Still) to polka (Brave Combo), the dominant style of music at the festival is "Folk-Pop". Past festivals have included such artists as Dar Williams, Aiden James, Richard Shindell, Lucy Kaplansky, Ani DiFranco, Tom Paxton, Vance Gilbert, Tracy Grammer, Ellis Paul, John Gorka, Holly Near, Crooked Still, Eddie From Ohio, The Nields, We're About 9, Greg Brown, Richard Thompson, Gandalf Murphy and the Slambovian Circus of Dreams, Mark Elliott, Lowen and Navarro, Christine Lavin and Shawn Colvin.

Falcon Ridge Folk Festival performances take place on several stages. The Main Stage features headline acts throughout the festival, including a songwriter "swap" on Friday nights, and a yearly showcase series of between twenty and thirty new or up-and-coming artists from noon to five on Friday afternoon; it is the only outdoor stage on which music continues after dark.

Across the festival grounds, the Workshop Stage features smaller-scale, generally acoustic performances around various themes throughout the day, often with several artists or groups playing "in the round". Family-oriented musical performances and other family-friendly fare, such as puppet shows, clowning and mimes like Hoopoe, also take place on the Family Stage throughout the daylight hours of the festival.

There is also a large Dance Tent that features various group and partnered dance styles until 2:00 AM, including Contra Dancing, Swing Dancing, Square Dancing, and Zydeco Dancing. Bands that have played in the dance tent include Nightingale, The Clayfoot Strutters, The Greenfield Dance Band, Steve Riley and the Mamou Playboys, the Reckless Ramblers, Big Table, Small Tattoo, Brave Combo and many more.

Dances are often led by dance callers. Among them have been Ralph Sweet, Beth Molaro, Steve Zakon-Anderson, Lisa Greenleaf, and Kathy Anderson.

In the evenings after the official performances are over the music continues at informal "campfires" and unofficial performance tents scattered throughout the camping areas.
