= Won't Let You Down =

Won't Let You Down may refer to:

- "Won't Let You Down" (song), a 2014 song by Hilltop Hoods featuring Maverick Sabre
- Won't Let You Down (album), a 2017 album by Bridget Kearney
- "Won't Let You Down", a song by Aerosmith, from the album Just Push Play
- "Won't Let You Down", a song by Calum Scott, from the album Only Human
- "Won't Let You Down", a song by Chamillionaire featuring Kevin Cossom, from the 2007 album Ultimate Victory
- "Won't Let You Down", a B-side to "Lyla", a 2005 song by Oasis

== See also ==
- Let You Down (disambiguation)
- I Won't Let You Down (disambiguation)
