= Bad Self Portraits =

Studio album by Lake Street Dive
- Released: February 18, 2014
- Recorded: Great North Sound Society, Parsonsfield (ME) (2012)
- Genres: Pop, blue-eyed soul
- Length: 39:22
- Label: Signature Sounds
- Producer: Sam Kassirer

Lake Street Dive chronology
Fun Machine (2012)	Bad Self Portraits (2014)	Side Pony (2016)

Bad Self Portraits is the fourth studio album by Lake Street Dive. It was released through Signature Sounds Recordings on February 18, 2014. Although recorded in 2012, the album suffered a delay due to contractual issues which were resolved in October 2013. The band travelled to the Great North Sound Society, a studio situated in an 18th-century farmhouse in rural Maine to record with Sam Kassirer (Josh Ritter). Price described the recording process as 'we went into the studio with no expectations of what people wanted or what kind of album people thought we should make'.

The single of the same name received airplay on adult alternative-formatted radio stations.

== Reception ==
Professional ratings
Review scores
Source	Rating
AllMusic	3.5/5 stars
PopMatters	8/10
Paste Magazine	7.5/10
Slant Magazine	4/5 stars

=== Critical ===
The album received generally favourable reviews.

Writing for Allmusic, music critic Matt Collar wrote "the album showcases lead singer Rachael Price's resonant, old-school singing, which is still the main reason to listen to Lake Street Dive. Of course, with her band backing her at various times with harmony vocals, jazzy trumpet, crunchy tube guitar riffs, and woody jazz basslines, there's always something rootsy and unexpected happening around her on Bad Self Portraits." Zachary Houle of PopMatters wrote Bad Self Portraits "is a startling record, one that shows the group tightening up its songwriting chops and presenting a much more unified statement, front to back."

Hilary Saunders of Paste Magazine wrote "Lake Street Dive is a group effort and that its core is powerfully impressive, even if this collection of songs is wrapped up in an unnecessarily over-produced package." Annie Galvin of Slant Magazine wrote "Bigger, louder, and more eclectic works well on Bad Self Portraits, but smaller, quieter, and more precise was what made the band's earlier efforts so distinctive. Here's hoping that they find a way to keep varying their sound without detaching too dramatically from their modest but inimitable street-corner roots."

=== Commercial ===
The album debuted at No. 18 on the Billboard 200 albums chart, with around 14,000 copies sold on its first week of release in the US. It also debuted at No. 5 on the Billboard's Rock Albums chart, and No. 2 on the Independent Albums charts. The album has sold 90,000 copies in the US as of January 2016.

== Track listing ==
All tracks are written by Lake Street Dive

No.	Title	Writer(s)	Length
1.	"Bad Self Portraits"	Bridget Kearney	3:24
2.	"Stop Your Crying"	Mike Calabrese	3:34
3.	"Better Than"	Bridget Kearney	3:35
4.	"Rabid Animal"	Bridget Kearney	2:13
5.	"You Go Down Smooth"	Mike Olson	3:29
6.	"Use Me Up"	Mike Olson	3:57
7.	"Bobby Tanqueray"	Mike Calabrese	3:32
8.	"Just Ask"	Mike Olson	5:05
9.	"Seventeen"	Bridget Kearney	3:39
10.	"What About Me"	Mike Calabrese	4:17
11.	"Rental Love"	Bridget Kearney	2:37

== Personnel ==
- Rachael Price – lead vocals
- Mike "McDuck" Olson – guitar, trumpet, trombone, piano and vocals
- Bridget Kearney – bass, piano and vocals
- Mike Calabrese – drums, percussion and vocals
- Sam Kassirer – piano and organ

Technical personnel

- Sam Kassirer, assisted by Erik Hischmann – mixing and production
- Jeff Lipton, assisted by Maria Rice – mastering at Peerless Mastering, Boston
- Robert and Gudrun Cuillo – executive producers

Design

- Philip Price – graphic design
- Jarrod McCabe – photography

== Charts ==
=== Weekly charts ===
Chart (2014)	Peak position
Belgian Albums (Ultratop Flanders)	196
US Billboard 200	18
US Independent Albums (Billboard)	2
US Top Rock Albums (Billboard)	5
US Indie Store Album Sales (Billboard)	22
