= Side Pony =

Studio album by Lake Street Dive
- Released: February 19, 2016
- Recorded: 2016
- Studios: Sound Emporium (Nashville, Tennessee)
- Genres: Pop, Indie
- Length: 40:20
- Label: Nonesuch
- Producer: Dave Cobb

Lake Street Dive chronology
Bad Self Portraits (2014)	Side Pony (2016)	Free Yourself Up (2018)

Side Pony is the fifth studio album by Lake Street Dive. It was released through Nonesuch Records on February 19, 2016 both as a CD and on vinyl and various electronic formats.

== Reception ==
Professional ratings
Review scores
Source	Rating
AllMusic	3.5/5 stars

Writing for Allmusic, music critic Matt Collar wrote "they've honed their sound even further, zeroing in on a vintage-inspired, '60s soul aesthetic." The Wall Street Journal called the album "An utterly twang-free collection that includes a few shimmering dance tracks as well as 1960s-style rock, soul and R&B numbers"

The album debuted at No. 1 on three Billboard' charts – Top Rock Albums, Folk Albums and Alternative Albums charts. It also debuted at No. 29 on the Billboard 200, and No. 11 on Top Album Sales, with 16,000 copies sold in the first week.

=== Accolades ===
Publication	Accolade	Year	Rank
Paste	The 50 Best Albums of 2016	2016	38

== Track listing ==
No.	Title	Writer(s)	Length
1.	"Godawful Things"	Mike Olson	3:48
2.	"Close to Me"	Mike Calabrese	4:18
3.	"Call Off Your Dogs"	Bridget Kearney	3:26
4.	"Spectacular Failure"	Mike Olson	2:32
5.	"I Don't Care About You"	Michael Calabrese	3:36
6.	"So Long"	Bridget Kearney	2:44
7.	"How Good It Feels"	Bridget Kearney	2:14
8.	"Side Pony"	Mike Olson	3:02
9.	"Hell Yeah"	Bridget Kearney	3:24
10.	"Mistakes"	Rachael Price	4:08
11.	"Can't Stop"	Michael Calabrese, Bridget Kearney, Mike Olson, Rachael Price, Jesse Boyce, Sanchez Harley	3:24
12.	"Saving All My Sinning"	Bridget Kearney	3:44

== Personnel ==
- Rachael Price – lead vocals
- Mike "McDuck" Olson – guitar, trumpet, organ, piano and vocals
- Bridget Kearney – bass, electric bass, piano and vocals
- Mike Calabrese – drums, percussion, organ and vocals
- Dave Cobb – guitar

Technical personnel

- Dave Cobb – production
- Darrell Thorp assisted by Mike Stankiewicz and Eddie Spear – engineering and mixing
- Pete Lyman – mastering at Infrasonic Sound, Los Angeles

Design

- Jeri Heiden and Nick Steinhardt for SMOG Design – art direction and design
- Danny Clinch – photography

== Charts ==
Chart (2016)	Peak position
Belgian Albums (Ultratop Flanders)	162
US Billboard 200	29
US Top Alternative Albums (Billboard)	1
US Americana/Folk Albums (Billboard)	1
US Top Rock Albums (Billboard)	1
US Indie Store Album Sales (Billboard)	6
