= Fun Machine =

Album by Lake Street Dive

EP by Lake Street Dive
- Released: May 29, 2012
- Genre: Pop, blue-eyed soul
- Length: 22:03
- Label: Signature Sounds
- Producer: Joe Bass, Lake Street Dive

Lake Street Dive chronology
Live at the Lizard Lounge (2011)	Fun Machine (2012)	Bad Self Portraits (2014)

Fun Machine is an EP by Lake Street Dive, released in 2012. It reached number 15 on the Top Heatseekers chart.

== Reception ==
Professional ratings
Review scores
Source	Rating
AllMusic	3.5/5 stars

Writing for Allmusic, music critic Matt Collar wrote of the album "This is buoyant, fun music that combines the group's jazz, pop, and R&B influences and showcases frontwoman Rachael Price's resonant, soulful vocals."

== Track listing ==
1. "Faith" (George Michael) – 3:37
2. "Clear a Space" (Rachael Price, Tom Price) – 4:00
3. "I Want You Back" (Berry Gordy, Freddie Perren, Alphonzo Mizell, Deke Richards) – 4:19
4. "Rich Girl" (Daryl Hall) – 3:37
5. "This Magic Moment" (Doc Pomus, Mort Shuman) – 2:48
6. "Let Me Roll It" (Paul McCartney, Linda McCartney) – 3:42

== Personnel ==
- Rachael Price – lead vocals
- Mike "McDuck" Olson – guitar, trumpet, vocals
- Bridget Kearney – bass, vocals
- Mike Calabrese – drums, percussion, vocals
- Daniel Clarke – keyboards

Technical personnel

- Joe Bass – producer
- Stuart Myers – mixing
- Joe Lambert – mastering

Design

- Robin Hayashi – design
- Deidre Schoo – photography

== Charts ==
Chart (2012)	Peak position
US Billboard 200	187
US Top Catalog Albums (Billboard)	38
US Heatseekers Albums (Billboard)	15
