= Let You Down =

Let You Down may refer to:

- "Let You Down" (NF song), 2017
- "Let You Down" (Peking Duk song), 2017
- "Let You Down" (Seether song), 2017
- "Let You Down", song by Black Veil Brides from the album Wretched and Divine: The Story of the Wild Ones, 2013
- "Let You Down", song by Three Days Grace from the album Three Days Grace, 2003

== See also ==
- Won't Let You Down (disambiguation)
- I Won't Let You Down (disambiguation)
