= Rachael Price =

American singer

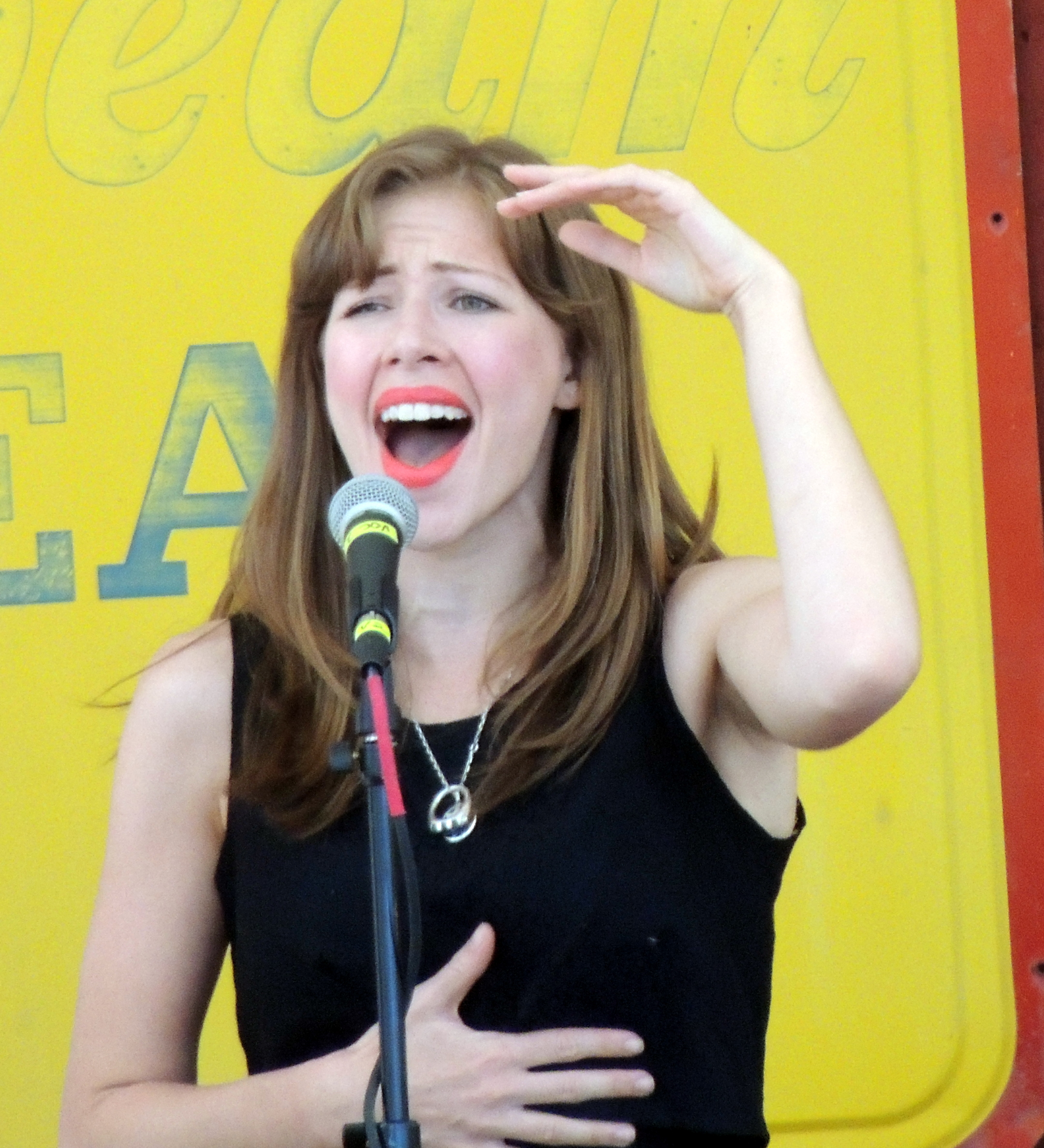
- Price in 2013

Background information
- Born: August 30, 1985 (age 41); Sydney, Australia
- Genres: Jazz, blues, alternative rock, Americana
- Occupation: Singer
- Years active: 2004–present
- Labels: Claire Vision, Signature Sounds, Nonesuch

Rachael Price (born August 30, 1985) is an Australian-American jazz and blues singer, known for her work as the lead singer for the band Lake Street Dive. She was born in Perth, Australia, and grew up in Tennessee, graduating from the New England Conservatory of Music in the class of ʼ07. She is the great-great-granddaughter of Seventh-day Adventist leader George McCready Price, the granddaughter of Hollywood actor John Shelton, and the daughter of composer and conductor Tom Price.

== Early life and career ==
Price was born in Australia and raised in Hendersonville, Tennessee. When she was nine, she performed with The Voices of Bahá, a Bahá'í choir directed by her dad, Tom Price. At twelve, she was a soloist. The choir toured in India, Europe, South America, Central America, the Caribbean, and Australia. Price has said that she had a large personality as a child and accepted every opportunity to sing.

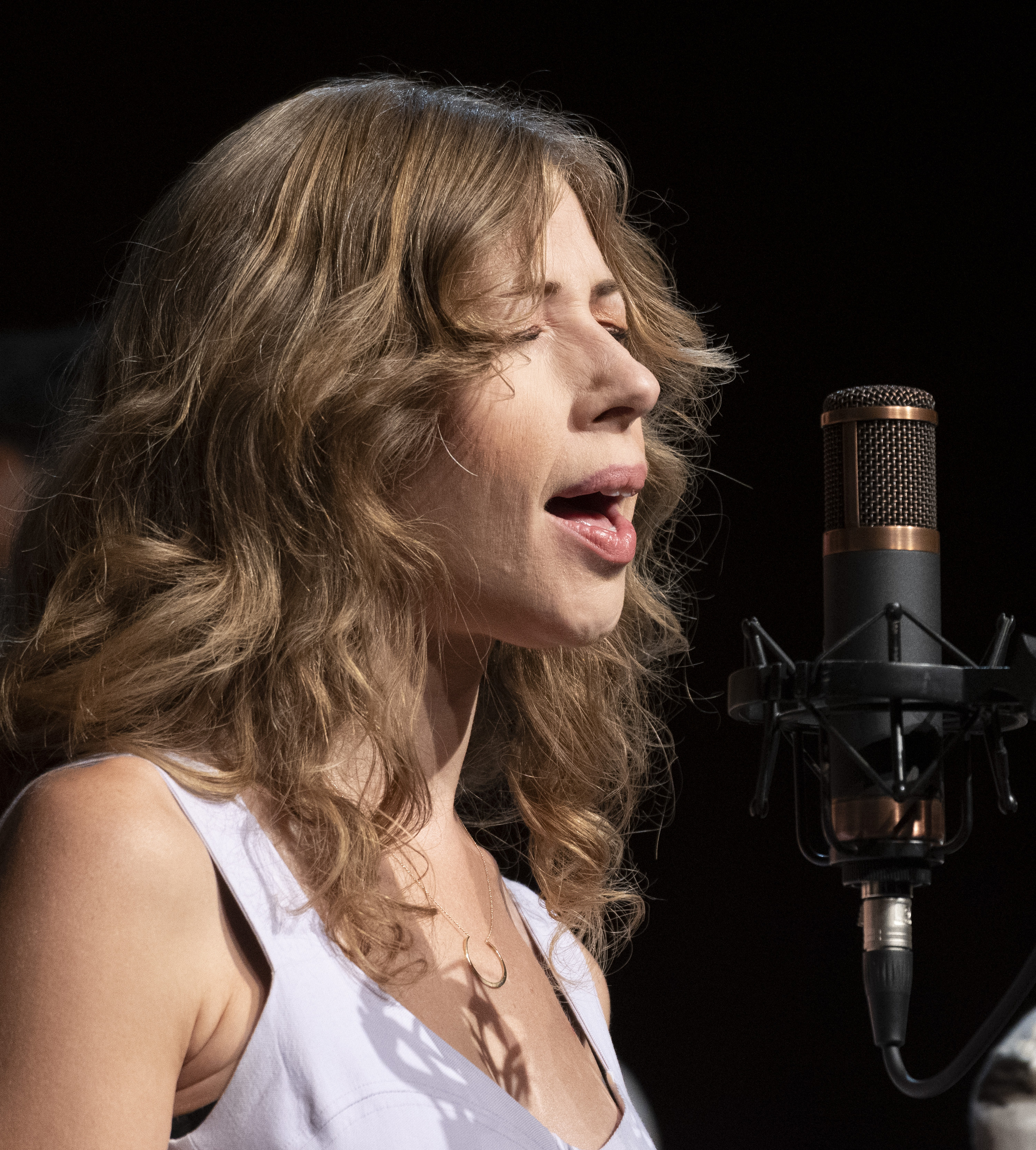
Rachael Price at the LBJ Presidential Library in 2022

Price practices the Baháʼí Faith, and explains its influence on her musical career this way:

We believe that music is praise, and that is service, and service is prayer, and so that's how I think about it. ... I think music is an extremely spiritual art form. I do it for praise and gratitude. That's what the Faith has taught me about music.

Price admires Bonnie Raitt and Nancy Wilson in part for their longevity in the music business. She was first attracted to jazz at the age of five, when she heard Ella Fitzgerald singing "The Lady is a Tramp". From age five to fifteen, Price studied Fitzgerald’s style, noting that she learned her performances “note for note”.

In 2003, Price received an honorable mention at the Montreux Jazz Festival's International Jazz Vocal Competition. In 2004, she was a semifinalist and the youngest competitor in the history of the Thelonious Monk Institute Vocal Competition. She recorded her first album, all jazz standards, Dedicated To You, when she was 17 (2003). Her sophomore album, The Good Hours, appeared just a few years later.

In August 2004, Price made her U.S. jazz festival debut at Yale's Jazz On the Green, where she opened for Joshua Redman. She won the 2006 Independent Music Award for Best Gospel Song for her recording of "My God, My Adored One" with the Boston Praise Collective. She also appeared in concert as a featured vocalist with the T. S. Monk Sextet.

Price then went on to study at the New England Conservatory of Music in Boston, Massachusetts. There she met Michael Calabrese, Bridget Kearney, and Mike “McDuck” Olson, with whom she would form the band Lake Street Dive.

== Personal life ==
Rachael Price was born in Perth, Australia, and moved to Tennessee at a young age alongside her three siblings Juliette, Joel, and Emily. Rachael grew up in a musical household; she has stated that some of her favorite childhood memories include dancing and singing with her sisters and dad.

Rachael Price married Taylor Ashton in 2019. Based in Brooklyn, they welcomed a daughter in 2023. She often speaks about how important it is to stay healthy on the road.

== Lake Street Dive ==
Price performs with Lake Street Dive, a band she started with Michael Calabrese, Bridget Kearney, and Mike (“McDuck”) Olson, who first met as students at the New England Conservatory of Music (NEC) in 2004. Olson originally asked the members individually if they would be interested in joining a band and playing some of his original songs, as opposed to the big-band and blues styles that they had all been studying at NEC, which helped create a sort of songwriting niche in the NEC jazz composition department. Price and the rest of the band were joined by Akie Bermiss in 2017, and James Cornelison after Olson left in 2021.

With help from an award from the John Lennon Songwriting Contest, Lake Street Dive recorded In this episode..., their debut album in 2006. They started touring soon afterward. Nonesuch released the album Side Pony in February 2016. Their previous album, Bad Self Portraits, was released in February 2014.

Price says that she started to really notice the popularity in 2012. After several years of playing in bars around Boston and Cambridge, they began to amass a following after releasing an EP of covers, which helped them realize the satisfaction of simpler songs with catchy melodies, as opposed to the harmony-heavy standards that they were used to playing in jazz bands.

== Rachael & Vilray ==
Rachael Price and the guitarist and singer Vilray also met as students at the New England Conservatory, in 2003. Price asked Vilray after one of his shows at a bar if she could perform with him, and they began gigging and recording Vilray’s original songs together.

While Rachael’s in-depth studies of vocalists like Ella Fitzgerald and Sarah Vaughan have informed her entire career, their influence on her work with Vilray is immeasurable. Before Price agreed to singing on Vilray’s original pieces, he told Price that he had Billie Holiday’s voice and style in mind when he was writing the first of his tunes, and her extensive jazz background gave her the technique Vilray was looking for. Rachael Price always looked up to Ella Fitzgerald and Sara Vaughan, and it is with Vilray that their influences can truly be heard.

The duo performs Vilray's original songs, which are inspired by the jazz, pop, and Tin Pan Alley music of the 1930s and 1940s. Nonesuch released their self-titled first album in 2019, with their second album, I Love A Love Song!, released in 2023.

The studio production of their work is inspired by the now-vintage engineering styles of the 1920s and 30s: little isolation, very “upfront vocal and the band far behind,” and recording the live performances after having only rehearsed once.

== Additional projects ==
In 2015, Price toured with Hot Tuna on the Jefferson Airplane 50th Anniversary tour. She sang Grace Slick’s parts.

== Discography ==
=== As leader ===
- Dedicated to You (Claire Vision, 2003)
- The Good Hours (Claire Vision, 2008)

=== With Rachael & Vilray ===
- "Songs of Rachael & Vilray" (self released, 2017)
- Rachael & Vilray (Nonesuch, 2019)
- I Love a Love Song (Nonesuch, 2023)
- West of Broadway (Concord, 2025)

With Rachael Price & The Tennessee Terraplanes

- Refreshingly Cool (, 2008)

=== With Lake Street Dive ===
- In This Episode... (FYO, 2006)
- Promises, Promises (FYO, 2008)
- Lake Street Dive (Signature Sounds, 2010)
- Fun Machine (Signature Sounds, 2012)
- Bad Self Portraits (Signature Sounds, 2014)
- Side Pony (Nonesuch, 2016)
- Free Yourself Up (Nonesuch, 2018)
- Obviously (Nonesuch, 2021)
- Fun Machine: The Sequel (Signature Sounds, 2022)
- Good Together (Fantasy Records, Distributed by Concord 2024)

== Video ==
- Live at the Lizard Lounge (2011)
- Lake Street Dive: NPR Tiny Desk Concert (2016)
- Lake Street Dive with NEC Gospel Ensemble (2017)
