= Obviously (album) =

Studio album by Lake Street Dive
- Released: March 12, 2021
- Length: 39:02
- Label: Nonesuch
- Producer: Mike Elizondo

Lake Street Dive chronology
Free Yourself Up (2018)	Obviously (2021)	Fun Machine: The Sequel (2022)

Obviously is the seventh studio album by American band Lake Street Dive. It was released on March 12, 2021, by Nonesuch Records. This was the group's first album to feature keyboard player Akie Bermiss as a full band member, as well as the last album to feature founding member and lead guitarist Mike "McDuck" Olson.

== Background ==
Obviously was recorded and completed before the COVID-19 pandemic with an intended release date in the fall of 2020 before being postponed. The album's songs address topics such as climate change, womanhood, female empowerment, and failed relationships.

== Critical reception ==
Professional ratings
Aggregate scores
Source	Rating
Metacritic	83/100
Review scores
Source	Rating
AllMusic	4.5/5 stars
American Songwriter	3.5/5 stars
The Boston Globe	3.5/5 stars
PopMatters	9/10
Rolling Stone	3.5/5 stars

Mark Kennedy of the Associated Press gave the album a positive review, praising it for its cohesive direction and for the production allowing the band to be "given a chance to shine in every song". However, Marc Hirsh of The Boston Globe was mixed in his review of the album, criticizing multiple tracks such as the "unfocused" "Making Do" and the "dull" "Know That I Know", although he called "Being a Woman" and "Hypotheticals" the album's two highlights.

== Track listing ==
Obviously track listing
No.	Title	Writer(s)	Length
1.	"Hypotheticals"	Bridget Kearney	3:50
2.	"Hush Money"	Mike Calabrese; Mike "McDuck" Olson	2:48
3.	"Same Old News"	Akie Bermiss; Olson	4:36
4.	"Being a Woman"	Kearney	2:49
5.	"Making Do"	Calabrese; Kearney	3:34
6.	"Nobody's Stopping You Now"	Kearney; Rachael Price	3:47
7.	"Know That I Know"	Bermiss; Olson	4:02
8.	"Lackluster Lover"	Bermiss; Price	3:29
9.	"Anymore"	Bermiss	4:10
10.	"Feels Like the Last Time"	Bermiss; Kearney	3:19
11.	"Sarah"	Bermiss; Calabrese	2:38
Total length:			39:02

== Personnel ==
Credits for Obviously adapted from Tidal.

=== Lake Street Dive ===
- Rachael Price - vocals, writing
- Bridget Kearney - vocals, background vocals, bass, synthesizer, writing
- Michael Calabrese - drums, writing, background vocals, percussion
- Akie Bermiss - vocals, keyboards, synthesizer, piano, background vocals, writing
- Mike "McDuck" Olson - guitar, mandolin, strings, trumpet, writing

=== Additional musicians ===
- Kristin Andreassen - background vocals
- Anthony Lamarchina - cello
- Bruce Christensen - viola
- Alan Umstead - violin
- Catherine Umstead - violin
- Jung-Min Shin - violin
- Kathryn Vanosdale - violin

=== Technical and visuals ===
- Mike Elizondo - producer
- Chris Gehringer - mastering
- Lawson White - engineering
- Zach Stokes - assistant
- Adam Hawkins - mixing
- Dewey Saunders - artwork
- Shervin Lainez - photography
- Leo Krauss - prints

== Charts ==
Chart performance for Obviously
Chart (2021)	Peak position
UK Americana Albums (Official Charts)	10
US Billboard 200	63
US Americana/Folk Albums (Billboard)	3
US Top Alternative Albums (Billboard)	6
US Top Rock Albums (Billboard)	7
US Indie Store Album Sales (Billboard)	3
US Vinyl Albums (Billboard)	8
