= Free Yourself Up =

Studio album by Lake Street Dive
- Released: May 4, 2018
- Recorded: 2018
- Studio: Goosehead Palace (Nashville)
- Genre: Pop, Indie
- Length: 43:02
- Label: Nonesuch
- Producer: Dan Knobler; Lake Street Dive

Lake Street Dive chronology
Side Pony (2016)	Free Yourself Up (2018)	Obviously (2021)

Professional ratings
Aggregate scores
Source	Rating
Metacritic	66/100
Review scores
Source	Rating
AllMusic	4/5 stars
American Songwriter	3/5 stars
MusicOMH	2.5/5 stars

Free Yourself Up is the sixth studio album by Lake Street Dive. It was released through Nonesuch Records on May 4, 2018 both as a CD and on vinyl and various electronic formats. The album was produced by Lake Street Dive and Dan Knobler.

== Critical reception ==
Free Yourself Up was met with generally favorable reviews from critics. At Metacritic, which assigns a weighted average rating out of 100 to reviews from mainstream publications, this release received an average score of 66, based on 7 reviews.

== Track listing ==
No.	Title	Writer(s)	Length
1.	"Baby, Don't Leave Me Alone with My Thoughts"	Bridget Kearney	3:34
2.	"Good Kisser"	Kearney	3:38
3.	"Shame, Shame, Shame"	Kearney	4:20
4.	"I Can Change"	Kearney; Rachael Price	3:12
5.	"Dude"	Kearney; Mike Olson	5:34
6.	"Red Light Kisses"	Michael Calabrese; Olson	4:12
7.	"Doesn't Even Matter Now"	Calabrese; Olson	4:22
8.	"You Are Free"	Calabrese; Olson	3:47
9.	"Musta Been Something"	Kearney	5:46
10.	"Hang On"	Kearney; Olson	4:43
Total length:			43:02

== Personnel ==
- Michael Calabrese – drums, percussion and vocals
- Bridget Kearney – bass and vocals
- Mike "McDuck" Olson – guitar, trumpet and maybe vocals
- Rachael Price – lead vocals
- Akie Bermiss – keyboards and vocals
- Jamie Dick – additional drums on "Dude"

Technical personnel

- Dan Knobler - engineering at Goosehead Palace, Nashville TN
- Joe Visciano – mixing at Studio II2 in Brooklyn NY
- Randy Merrill – mastering at Sterling Sound, New York NY

Design

- Ben Tousley – art direction and design
- Shervin Lainez – photography

== Charts ==
Chart (2018)	Peak position
Canadian Albums (Billboard)	64
US Billboard 200	8
US Folk Albums (Billboard)	10
US Top Alternative Albums (Billboard)	2
US Top Rock Albums (Billboard)	2
