= Live at the Lizard Lounge =

Live at Lizard Lounge

Video by Lake Street Dive
- Released: August 22, 2011
- Recorded: 2011
- Venue: Lizard Lounge, Cambridge, Massachusetts
- Genre: Pop, blue-eyed soul
- Length: 52:55
- Label: Signature Sounds
- Director: Greg Liszt

Lake Street Dive chronology
Lake Street Dive (2010)	Live at Lizard Lounge (2011)	Fun Machine (2012)

Live at the Lizard Lounge! is the first live recording by Lake Street Dive. It was released through their website on August 22, 2011.

== Reception ==
Writing for PopMatters, Zachary Houle said, "Well, Live at the Lizard Lounge, which was recorded earlier this year at a hometown show, has an amazing soundtrack but a rather underwhelming video to accompany it. So you'd be both in the right and the wrong to pick this one up. But we should focus on the positives first. The soundtrack largely culls material from Lake Street Dive, with three choice, intriguing covers thrown into the mix: the old soul and R&B standard "This Magic Moment" (first recorded by the Drifters in 1960, but then covered by unlikely acts such as Lou Reed and the Misfits), George Michael's "Faith" and Hall and Oates' "Rich Girl". While the band's recorded output leans into folk, soul and jazz territory, Live at the Lizard Lounge is a much more rocking affair, largely focusing on the guitar and trumpet finesse of Mike Olson."

== Track listing ==
Video tracks are from liner notes Audio only tracks are offered on iTunes.

2011 Video edition
No.	Title	Writer(s)	Length
1.	"You Go Down Smooth"	Mike Olson	4:32
2.	"Don't Make Me Hold Your Hand"	Mike Olson	5:49
3.	"Henriette"	Mike Olson	3:49
4.	"Be Cool"	Bridget Kearney	5:20
5.	"This Magic Moment (cover)"	Doc Pomus & Mort Shuman	3:00
6.	"Neighbor Song"	Bridget Kearney	5:04
7.	"Got Me Fooled"	Mike Calabrese	4:37
8.	"Elijah"	Mike Olson	3:17
9.	"Miss Disregard"	Mike Calabrese	5:06
10.	"Faith (cover)"	George Michael	4:22
11.	"My Heart's in Its Right Place"	Mike Olson	3:49
12.	"Rich Girl (cover)"	Daryl Hall & John Oates	4:10
Total length:			52:55

== Personnel ==
- Rachael Price – lead vocals
- Mike "McDuck" Olson – guitar, trumpet, vocals
- Bridget Kearney – bass guitar, vocals
- Mike Calabrese – drums, percussion and vocals
