= Lake Street Dive (album) =

Studio album by Lake Street Dive
- Released: November 9, 2010
- Studio: Basement 247, Allston MA
- Genre: Pop, blue-eyed soul
- Length: 55:05
- Label: Signature Sounds
- Producer: Jack Younger

Lake Street Dive chronology
Promises, Promises (2007)	Lake Street Dive (2010)	Live at the Lizard Lounge (2011)

Lake Street Dive is an album by American band Lake Street Dive, released in 2010.

== Reception ==
Professional ratings
Review scores
Source	Rating
AllMusic	3.5/5 stars

Writing for Allmusic, music critic j. poet wrote of the album "Lake Street Dive don't sound anything like a band you'd hear in a dive. They're a bright, bubbly pop-jazz quartet and write songs that would fit perfectly on an AAA, lite jazz, or adult contemporary station. "

== Track listing ==
All tracks are written by Lake Street Dive

No.	Title	Writer(s)	Length
1.	"Hello? Goodbye!"	Bridget Kearney	3:34
2.	"Don't Make Me Hold Your Hand"	Mike Olson	6:11
3.	"Henriette"	Olson	3:38
4.	"My Heart's in Its Right Place"	Olson	3:34
5.	"I Don't Really See You Anymore"	Kearney	2:41
6.	"Miss Disregard"	Mike Calabrese	3:03
7.	"Elijah"	Olson	3:11
8.	"Funny Not to Care"	Olson	3:49
9.	"Neighbor Song"	Kearney	4:31
10.	"Got Me Fooled"	Calabrese	3:22
11.	"We All Love the Same Songs"	Olson, Rachael Price, Kearney, Calabrese	3:52
12.	"Don't Make Me Hold Your Hand (Reprise)" (radio tuning noises & gospel singing)	Olson, Price, Kearney, Calabrese	0:38
13.	"My Speed"	Olson	4:50
14.	"Neighbor Song (Reprise)" (hidden track, music starts at 3:24)	Kearney	8:11

== Personnel ==
- Rachael Price – lead vocals
- Mike "McDuck" Olson – guitar, trumpet
- Bridget Kearney – acoustic bass, background vocals
- Mike Calabrese – drums, background vocals

Special Guests

- Alex Asher – trombone
- Jesse Dee – vocals
- Lyle Brewer – guitar
- Eric Lane – keyboards
- Margaret Glaspy, Kimber Ludiker, Luke Price – violins
- Alex Spiegelman – saxophone
- Liam Robinson – accordion
- Emeen Zarookian – piano on "We All Love the Same Songs"

Technical personnel

- Jack Younger assisted by Evan Ruscher, Recording Engineer
- Nick Zampiello & Rob Gonella, Mastering at New Alliance East Cambridge MA

Design

- Margaret Kearney, Art & Design
