= Joy Kills Sorrow =

US musical group

- Origin: Boston, MA
- Genres: American roots, indie pop, bluegrass, folk rock, jazz
- Years active: 2005 - 2014
- Label: Signature Sounds
- Members: Matthew Arcara; Emma Beaton; Wes Corbett; Jacob Jolliff; Zoe Guigueno
- Past members: Bridget Kearney; Joe Walsh
- Website: www.joykillssorrow.com

Joy Kills Sorrow was a Boston-based indie pop, American roots stringband formed in 2005. The band at its last concert in May 2014 consisted of founding member and award-winning flatpicking guitarist Matthew Arcara, vocalist Emma Beaton, Wes Corbett on banjo, Jacob Jolliff on mandolin and Zoe Guigueno on bass.

The band's name is a play on the call letters of WJKS, the Indiana radio station that broadcast the Monroe Brothers in the 1930s.

== History ==
In 2007, the group won first prize in the Podunk Bluegrass Festival Band Contest.

In September 2012, it was announced that bassist Bridget Kearney would be departing the group to concentrate on working with her own group, Lake Street Dive.

In February 2013, Zoe Guigueno joined the group as its new bassist.

In February 2014, Joy Kills Sorrow announced via its Facebook page that its members would soon go their separate ways after playing one last show on May 1, 2014 at Cambridge's Lizard Lounge.

== Band member backgrounds ==
Emma Beaton joined the band after just turning 18, right in the last couple months of high school. She went on to study cello at Berklee College of Music and was awarded “Young Performer of the Year” at the Canadian Folk Music Awards in 2008.

Matthew Arcara took first place in the National Flat Pick Guitar contest at the Walnut Valley Festival in 2006.

Jacob Jolliff, who was Berklee's first full-scholarship mandolin student, won first place in the National Mandolin Championship in 2012 at the Walnut Valley Festival.

Wes Corbett teaches banjo at Berklee College of Music.

Zoe Guigueno is a British Columbia native, graduated with the President's Award for the Creative and Performing Arts from Canada's prestigious Humber College in Toronto, where she studied jazz bass. She recorded and toured for years throughout Canada and Europe with acclaimed Canadian bands Fish & Bird, Crooked Brothers and Bull Kelp before joining Joy Kills Sorrow.

== Influences ==
Joy Kills Sorrow draws influence from jazz, pop and rock.

== Releases ==
- Joy Kills Sorrow (2006)
- Darkness Sure Becomes This City (2010)
- This Unknown Science (2011)
- Wide Awake (EP) (2013)
