= Won't Let You Down (album) =

Studio album by Bridget Kearney
- Released: March 24, 2017
- Recorded: 2013–2016
- Studios: Faraway Sound, Brooklyn
- Genre: Pop
- Label: Signature Sounds
- Producer: Robin MacMillan

Bridget Kearney chronology
BAWA (with Ben Lazar Davis) (2015)	Won't Let You Down (2017)	Still Flying (with Ben Lazar Davis) (2020)

Won't Let You Down is the first solo studio album by Bridget Kearney. It was released through Signature Sounds Recordings on March 24, 2017.

== Critical reception ==
The album received generally favorable reviews.

Emily Zimmerman, of Exclaim writes: "Won't Let You Down may be Bridget Kearney's debut album, but she's no newbie; she's the brilliant bassist and frequent songwriter for Boston-bred soul-pop group Lake Street Dive. For her solo debut, she's left behind the easily accessible, G-rated funk her band does best for a brainy, infectious and mature sound."

Glide Magazine writer Lee Zimmerman states: "Kearney adheres to a somewhat orthodox approach, one that emphasizes accessible melodies and an overall sound that shows a preference for a pure pop motif. Unlike the music she makes at her day job, there’s no tendency to bend the boundaries or strongly tug at the parameters. Rather, Won’t Let You Down is an album that proposes nothing more than offering a set of shimmering melodies and tunes that are decidedly gorgeous and giddy all at the same time."

Ken Williams of Little Village magazine notes: "You know Bridget Kearney isn't playing around on Won’t Let You Down; there is serious songwriting expertise deployed here, and deeply satisfying, layered production, perfect for a late night with the big headphones in the dark. Every song is nearly perfect; I could take up the whole magazine trying to describe how the ways they aren’t make them more interesting. Lake Street Dive deserve their success, and Kearney's voice and songwriting have served them well over the years. But Won’t Let You Down is something else entirely — more personal, adventurous and odd in all the right ways. Kearney is an incurable, but skeptical, romantic; under the perfect pop sheen there's something complex and disquieting lurking."

== Track listing ==
Bandcamp provided times, all other information from liner notes.

All tracks are written by Bridget Kearney

No.	Title	Length
1.	"Won't Let You Down"	2:50
2.	"What Happened Today"	5:00
3.	"Serenity"	2:59
4.	"Wash Up"	4:32
5.	"Who Are We Kidding"	2:59
6.	"Living in a Cave"	2:37
7.	"Love Doctor"	4:17
8.	"Nothing Does It"	4:21
9.	"Daniel"	3:11
10.	"So Long"	4:55

== Personnel ==
These people contributed to the album:

- Bridget Kearney – vocals, electric guitar, acoustic guitar, electric bass, keyboards, piano, organ (all tracks)
- Robin MacMillan – drums, percussion, electric guitar, acoustic guitar, keyboards (all tracks)
- Ryan Scott – electric guitar, slide guitar (tracks 6 and 9)
- Frank LoCrastoe – keyboards (tracks 1, 4 and 9)
- Alex Spiegelman – baritone sax, flute (track 1)
- Tom Ayres – electric guitar (track 3)

Technical

- Robin MacMillan – mixing and production
- Heba Kadry – mastering

Design

- Phillip Price – graphic design
- Sasha Arutyunova – photography
