= Comeback Kid (Bridget Kearney album) =

Studio album by Bridget Kearney
- Released: April 12, 2024
- Recorded: 2023
- Studios: Altamira Studios, Alhambra, CA
- Genre: Pop
- Length: 39:09
- Label: Keeled Scales
- Producer: Dan Molad

Bridget Kearney chronology
Snakes of Paradise (2023)	Comeback Kid (2024)

Comeback Kid is the third solo studio album by Bridget Kearney. It was released through Keeled Scales on April 12, 2024.

== Critical reception ==
The album has received generally favorable reviews.

In his April 2024 song-detailed, artist interview, Mitch Mosk of Atwood Magazine wrote that, "Comeback Kid, [is] an intimate, impassioned, and inspiring record of resilience and rebirth, overcoming life's challenges and rising out of our lows." With some of the songs having their genesis during the onset of the COVID-19 pandemic, "Bridget Kearney offers snapshots of our collective lockdown and subsequent return to "normalcy": Life as we once knew it, with a newfound appreciation for all that we lost and all that we previously took for granted...Kearney captured a slice of life in beautifully expressive songs yearning for connection, catharsis, and release."

Under the Radar's Caleb Campbell wrote that the album's lead single, "Comeback Kid", had a "liminal style of indie pop, joined by layers of vintage synths and atmospheric production." and that "as the song unfurls, Kearney is joined by an immersive rhythm section and dreamy backing vocals, elevating the track into a wistful and hazy reverie."

Matt Collar of AllMusic wrote that the album had "an eclectic vibe she's ... championed on her solo work, including 2017's "Won't Let You Down" and 2023's "Snakes of Paradise" albums that found her embracing a mix of melodic rock and sophisticated indie pop. With 2024's Comeback Kid, she further hones this end of her pop career, crafting memorable songs that are as likable and infectious as anything she's done with..."

== Track listing ==
Album and track listing information taken directly from album cover, liner notes, and, digital distribution medium.

All tracks are written by Bridget Kearney.

No.	Title	Length
1.	"If You're Driving"	4:42
2.	"Security Camera"	3:52
3.	"Sleep In"	3:19
4.	"A.J. (Interlude)"	0:42
5.	"Not a Game to Me"	2:43
6.	"Obsessed"	3:58
7.	"Obsessed (Interlude - CD and digital only)"	2:31
8.	"Roman Sunset"	3:39
9.	"I Feel So Bad For You"	3:50
10.	"Don't Think About the Polar Bear"	4:16
11.	"In the Morning"	3:25
12.	"Comeback Kid"	2:57

== Personnel ==
These people contributed to the album:

- Bridget Kearney: vocals, bass, keyboards, guitars
- Dan Molad: drums, percussion, keyboards, guitars
- Zach Tenorio: additional keyboards on "Roman Sunset" and "I Feel So Bad For You"
- Robin MacMillan: percussion on "Don't Think About The Polar Bear"
- Rob Shelton: keyboards on "Security Camera," "Don't Think About The Polar Bear" and "Obsessed"
- Adam Brisbin: guitar on "Obsessed"
- Peter Lalish: slide guitar on "I Feel So Bad For You"
- Jon Joseph: piano on "Not A Game To Me"
- Jeremy Udden: saxophone on "Don't Think About The Polar Bear"
- Dan Molad: keyboards on "Obsessed Interlude"
- Rob Shelton: keyboards, vibes on "Obsessed Interlude"

Technical

- Produced by Dan Molad
- Mixed by Dan Molad
- Mastered by Emily Lazar at The Lodge Mastering
- Engineered by Rob Shelton at Altamira Sound, Alhambra, CA (2, 3, 4, 6, 8 and 9) and by Jon Joseph at Squid Rag Dry Fly in San Pedro, CA (1, 5, 7, 10 and 11)

Note: tracks 8–12 on the digital edition are 7–11 on the album

Design

- Photography by Jeremy Herron with direction by Phineas Alexander
- Album Art by Anna Watson
