= Lake Street Dive =

American band founded in 2004 in Boston, Massachusetts

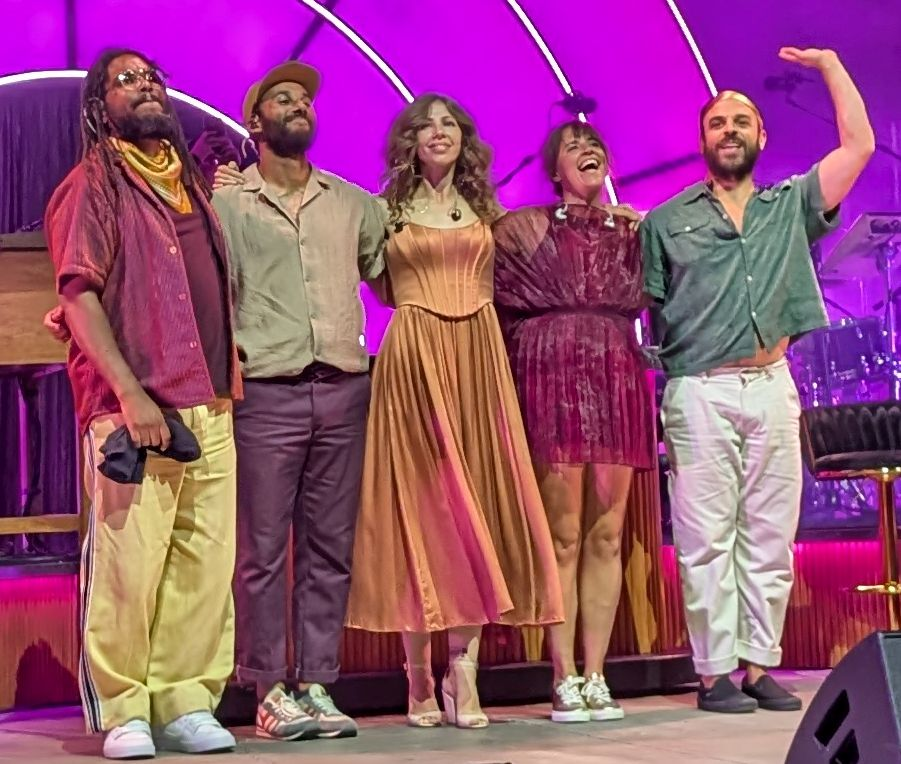
- Lake Street Dive L–R: Akie Bermiss, James Cornelison, Rachael Price, Bridget Kearney, Mike Calabrese, San Diego July 26, 2024.

Background information
- Origin: Boston, Massachusetts
- Genres: Pop-soul; indie pop; folk rock; alt-jazz
- Years active: 2004–present
- Labels: Signature Sounds: Nonesuch; Fantasy
- Members: Rachael Price; Bridget Kearney; Mike Calabrese; Akie Bermiss; James Cornelison
- Past members: Mike "McDuck" Olson
- Website: Official site

Lake Street Dive is an American multi-genre band that was formed in 2004 at the New England Conservatory of Music in Boston. The band's founding members are Rachael Price, Mike "McDuck" Olson, Bridget Kearney, and Mike Calabrese. Keyboardist Akie Bermiss joined the band on tour in 2017 and was first credited on their 2018 album Free Yourself Up; guitarist James Cornelison joined in 2021 after Olson left the band. The band is based in Brooklyn and frequently tours in North America, Australia, and Europe.

== Early history ==
The group was formed in 2004 as a "free country band"; they intended to play country music in an improvised, avant-garde style. This concept was abandoned in favor of something that "actually sounded good", according to Mike Olson. The band's name was inspired by the Bryant Lake Bowl, a frequent hang out in the band's early years, located on Lake Street in Minneapolis.

In 2005, band member Bridget Kearney won the Jazz Category of the John Lennon Songwriting Contest with the band's performance of her song "Sometimes When I'm Drunk and You're Wearing My Favorite Shirt." Using their prize ($1,000 cash and 1,000 CDs produced by Disc Makers) Lake Street Dive released their debut album In This Episode... in 2006. The band released their next album Promises, Promises in 2008. The full-length concert film and live album Live at the Lizard Lounge was recorded in 2010 and released in 2011. Initially, the band caught visibility by posting a funked-up viral video cover of The Jackson 5's I Want You Back.

In the early years, Lake Street Dive juggled their tours with other commitments. Between their first brief performance in a Des Moines, Iowa rock club in 2007 and their May 2011 appearance at The Berkeley Cafe in Raleigh, North Carolina, they performed around 100 times in 24 states. In September and October 2011 they traveled to 13 states and played in 22 venues.

== Label eras ==
=== Signature Sounds ===
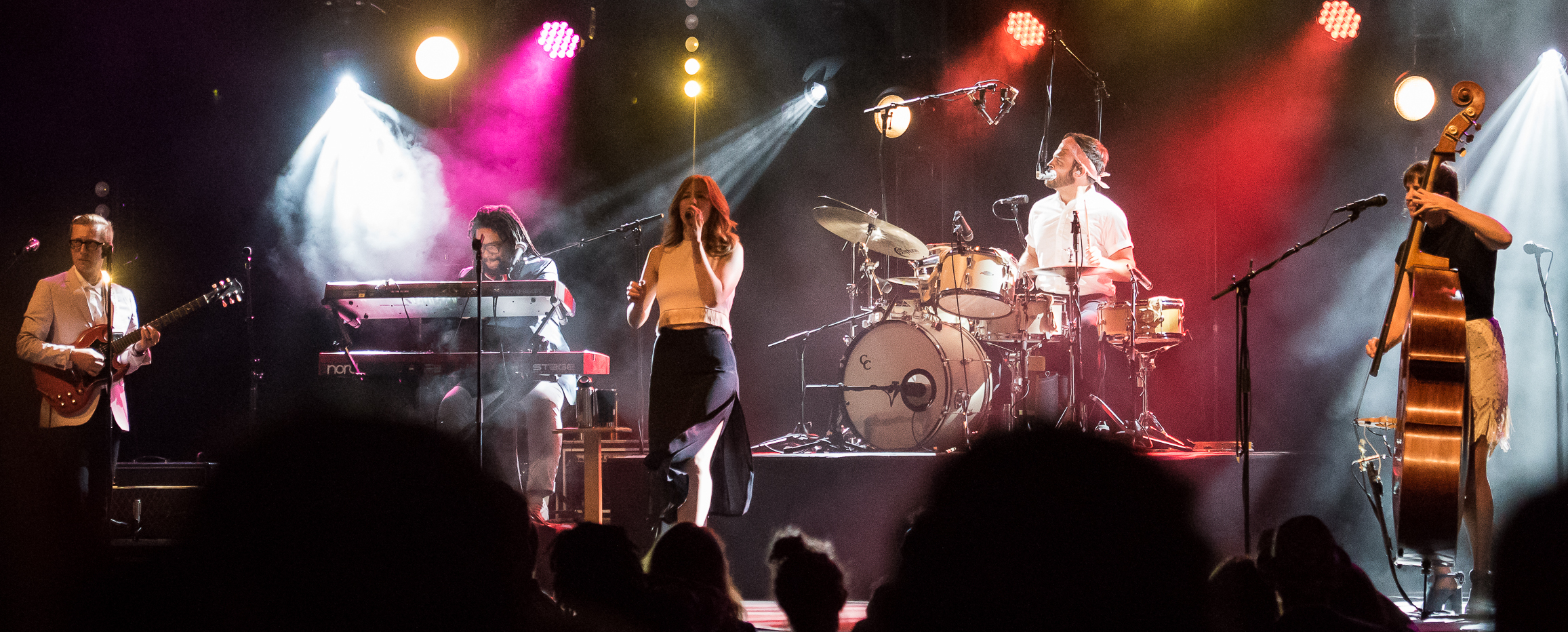
Lake Street Dive L-R: Mike "McDuck" Olson, Akie Bermiss, Rachael Price, Mike Calabrese, and Bridget Kearney at BRIC Celebrate Brooklyn! Festival, Brooklyn NY 2017.

Lake Street Dive released their first Signature Sounds Recordings album, Lake Street Dive, in November 2010. They credit Jim Olsen, president of Signature Sound, as being the band's dad "because of all the support he gave us when we were so infantile."

By 2012, the four-piece band decided to make a firm commitment as a group and to tour. Bridget Kearney left her other band, Joy Kills Sorrow, to concentrate on Lake Street Dive. Mike Calabrese also left his other band, Girls, Guns, and Glory (now known as Ward Hayden and The Outliers), to focus on Lake Street Dive. They went into the studio to record the album Fun Machine and some singles in November 2012.

Lead singer Rachael Price was still under contract with another label, Claire Vision. This prevented them from releasing the album recorded in the fall of 2012 featuring Price. In late 2013, an agreement was reached, and Lake Street Dive announced the release of their album Bad Self Portraits in February 2014.

In 2013 and 2014, they played over 300 gigs in over 175 different cities, spread between 43 states and eight countries. Their Bad Self Portraits tour sold out in 40 venues at the start of 2014.

On YouTube, their Jackson 5 cover of "I Want You Back" on a street corner has received more than 6 million views. Its viral success helped promote the band's visibility and popularity. Their performance at the 2013 FreshGrass Festival was filmed and directed by noted Brooklyn audio/visual collective Mason Jar Music. In December 2013, T Bone Burnett asked them to perform on the Another Day, Another Time show at The Town Hall featuring music from and inspired by the Coen brothers film Inside Llewyn Davis. Lake Street Dive has appeared on many television shows: The Colbert Report, The Late Show with David Letterman, Conan, and The Ellen DeGeneres Show. They are also frequent guests on the public radio variety show Live From Here.

The band has uploaded numerous videos, including their annual, humorous Halloween covers.

The band made some significant changes in their operations in 2015. In the winter of that year, they started work with Dave Cobb on a new record/CD in Nashville, signed with Nonesuch Records in November, and prepared for the release of the new album. In 2015, they performed at only 98 venues. However, they toured Australia and New Zealand in March, then picked up their usual pace until December. Their traditional Halloween video was Queen's "Bohemian Rhapsody".

=== Nonesuch Records ===
Lake Street Dive signed with Nonesuch Records in 2015 and released Side Pony in February 2016 with their new label. The album's name refers to a hairstyle adopted by Kearney and is slang for "unexpectedly diverting the mind's attention." The band made 183 appearances in 2017 and 2018, including tours through North America, Europe, Japan, New Zealand, and Australia. Members claimed that creating this song was "out of their comfort zone." They consistently mix genres within their music, and with Side Pony they added another element to the mix- disco. When they decided to implement disco into their repertoire, they decided to shy away from the stereotypical dance floor and disco ball thing. Instead, they blended different elements of disco music to their songs and mixed it with their go-to genres.

The band released their second album with Nonesuch, Free Yourself Up in May 2018. Kearney says, "This album is based in the realities in our time which have inevitably become part of everyone's daily life. It's something you think about and obsess over—and write songs about. Free Yourself Up is about empowering yourself, emboldening yourself, no matter what's going wrong." In November 2018, they released Freak Yourself Out, a five-song EP of songs written but not recorded for Free Yourself Up.

The band wrote the theme song for Somebody Feed Phil with the show's creator Philip Rosenthal and recorded the song. The song was nominated for an Emmy award for original main title theme music.

On May 10, 2021, trumpeter and guitarist Mike "McDuck" Olson announced he would be leaving Lake Street Dive after 16 years of performing with the band.

The band participated at the Newport Folk Festival in July 2021.

=== Fantasy Records ===
In September 2022, the band released "Fun Machine: The Sequel" through Fantasy Records. Collectively, the band described the EP in this way, "Imagine you walk into your favorite local dive bar and Lake Street Dive is on stage, doing our regular weekly gig for $5 a head. These are the songs we’d be covering there and how we’d be playing them. Some deep cuts, some sentimental favorites, and some (hopefully) epic crowd pleasers.".

"Good Together" was released in June 2024. The album was nominated for the 2025 Grammy Award for Best Traditional Pop Vocal Album.

== Influences ==
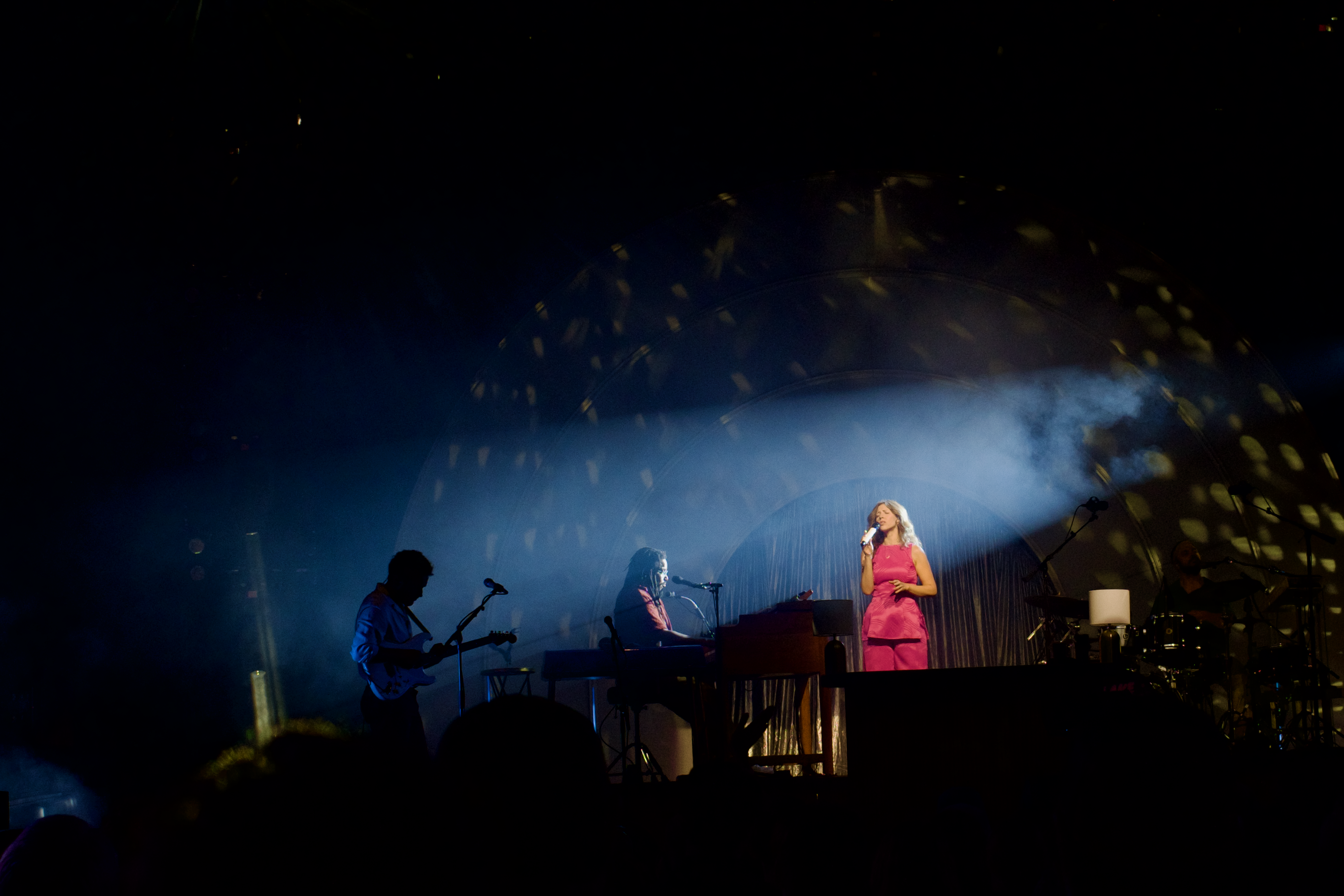
Lake Street Dive, July 2024

All the band members were singing and/or playing musical instruments by the time they were in third grade. Most had some classical music training growing up, and their parents were musicians. Each had migrated to jazz by the time they met. However, the band says they were influenced by the music their parents were playing at home. This ranged from classic jazz to '60s soul to rock and roll.

The band members profess to love the entire Beatles discography. Kearney wrote "Hello? Goodbye!" and the band plays "Don't Make Me Hold Your Hand," both referencing Beatles tunes. Olson says he was inspired by Paul McCartney's love/vice lyrical concept in "Got to Get You into My Life" when he wrote "You Go Down Smooth."

The band's traditional Halloween specials and covers on the EP release Fun Machine give an idea of the genres that influence them. These range from songs by the Mamas and the Papas, ABBA, the Drifters, Fleetwood Mac, Hall & Oates, Queen, Jackson 5 and Paul McCartney.

The band has been influenced by classic pop and swing-era jazz. "We want it to sound like the Beatles and Motown had a party together," says drummer Mike Calabrese. Critics describe their music as "Sounds Like: Llewyn Davis's favorite pop group; Motown meets the Brill Building in jazzy, soulful, woulda-been Sixties chart toppers."

Price has said that the band's performances are influenced by the audience in front of them. "We are translating [crowd energy] on stage, trying to figure out what kind of energy to put out to the crowds. For the first time, we feel we can mold the energy of a room."

== Members ==
Current

- Rachael Price – lead vocals, ukulele, guitar (2004–present)
- Bridget Kearney – acoustic bass, electric bass, piano, vocals (2004–present)
- Mike Calabrese – drums, organ, vocals (2004–present)
- Akie Bermiss – keyboards, organ, vocals (2017–present)
- James Cornelison – guitar, vocals (2021–present)

Former members

- Mike "McDuck" Olson – trumpet, guitar, piano, organ, vocals (2004–2021)

== Discography ==
=== Albums ===
==== Studio albums ====
List of studio albums, with selected chart positions
Title	Album details	Peak chart positions									
Title	Album details	US	US Alt.	US Folk	US Indie	US Rock	BEL	CAN	UK Sales	UK Amer.	UK Indie Brkr.
In This Episode...	Released: January 5, 2007; Label: FYO Records	—	—	—	—	—	—	—	—	—	—
Promises, Promises	Released: October 10, 2008; Label: FYO Records	—	—	—	—	—	—	—	—	—	—
Lake Street Dive	Released: November 9, 2010; Label: Signature Sounds	—	—	—	—	—	—	—	—	—	—
Bad Self Portraits	Released: February 18, 2014; Label: Signature Sounds	18	—	—	2	5	196	—	—	—	—
Side Pony	Released: February 19, 2016; Label: Nonesuch	29	1	1	—	1	162	—	—	4	—
Free Yourself Up	Released: May 4, 2018; Label: Nonesuch	8	2	10	—	2	—	64	—	11	—
Obviously	Released: March 12, 2021; Label: Nonesuch	63	6	3	—	7	—	—	— (Note: Obviously did not enter the UK Albums chart, but peaked at number 59 on the UK Album Downloadschart.)	10	—
Good Together	Released: June 21, 2024; Label: Fantasy Records	— (Note: Good Together did not enter the US Billboard 200, but peaked at number 15 on the US Top Album Sales Chart.)	—	16	39	—	—	—	86	18	20
"—" denotes a recording that did not chart or was not released in that territory.

==== Live albums ====
List of live albums
Title	Album details
Live at the Lizard Lounge	Released: August 22, 2011; Label: Signature Sounds

=== EPs ===
List of EPs, with selected chart positions
Title	Album details	Peak chart positions
Title	Album details	US
Fun Machine	Released: May 29, 2012; Label: Signature Sounds	187
Freak Yourself Out	Released: November 23, 2018; Label: Signature Sounds	—
Fun Machine: The Sequel	Released: September 9, 2022; Label: Fantasy Records	— (Note: Fun Machine: The Sequel did not enter the US Billboard 200, but peaked at number 75 on the US Top Album Sales Chart.)
"—" denotes a recording that did not chart or was not released in that territory.

=== Singles ===
List of singles, with selected chart positions, showing year released and album name
Title	Year	Peak chart positions				Album
Title	Year	US AAA	US Alt. DL	US Rock	BEL Tip	Album
"Bad Self Portraits"	2014	—	—	—	48	Bad Self Portraits
"What I'm Doing Here" / "Wedding Band"	2014	—	—	—	—	Non-album single
"Call Off Your Dogs"	2016	24	—	—	—	Side Pony
"I Don't Care About You"	2016	29	—	—	— (Note: "I Don't Care About You" did not enter the Ultratop Top 50, but spent 4 weeks as an extra tip on the Ultratop Bubbling Under chart.)	Side Pony
"Good Kisser"	2018	12	—	—	— (Note: "Good Kisser" did not enter the Ultratop Top 50, but spent 4 weeks as an extra tip on the Ultratop Bubbling Under chart.)	Free Yourself Up
"I Can Change"	2018	—	—	—	—	Free Yourself Up
"Shame Shame Shame"	2018	24	—	—	—	Free Yourself Up
"I Can Change (wiidope Remix)"	2019	—	—	—	—	Non-album single
"Making Do"	2020	28	—	—	—	Obviously
"Hypotheticals"	2021	2	15	44	—	Obviously
"Nobody's Stopping You Now"	2021	—	—	—	—	Obviously
"Know That I Know"	2021	33	—	—	—	Obviously
"Good Together"	2024	9	—	— (Note: "Good Together" did not chart on the Hot Rock & Alternative Songs chart but did peak at number 46 on the Rock & Alternative Airplay chart.)	—	Good Together
"Dance with a Stranger"	2024	36	—	—	—	Good Together
"You're Never Around"	2026	16	—	—	—	TBA
"—" denotes a recording that did not chart or was not released in that territory.
