= I Won't Let You Down =

I Won't Let You Down may refer to:

- "I Won't Let You Down" (Christopher song), 2016 Danish singer Christopher song featuring Bekuh BOOM
- "I Won't Let You Down" (Meghan Trainor song), 2016 song by Meghan Trainor from her album Thank You
- "I Won't Let You Down" (OK Go song), 2014 song
- "I Won't Let You Down" (Ph.D. song), 1982 song
- "I Won't Let You Down" (Jimmy Barnes song), 2019 single by Jimmy Barnes from My Criminal Record
- "I Won't Let You Down" (Westlife song), 2003 song by Westlife from Turnaround (Westlife album)

== See also ==
- I Will Never Let You Down, a 2014 song by Rita Ora which has a similar title
