= Bridget Kearney =

American musician and songwriter

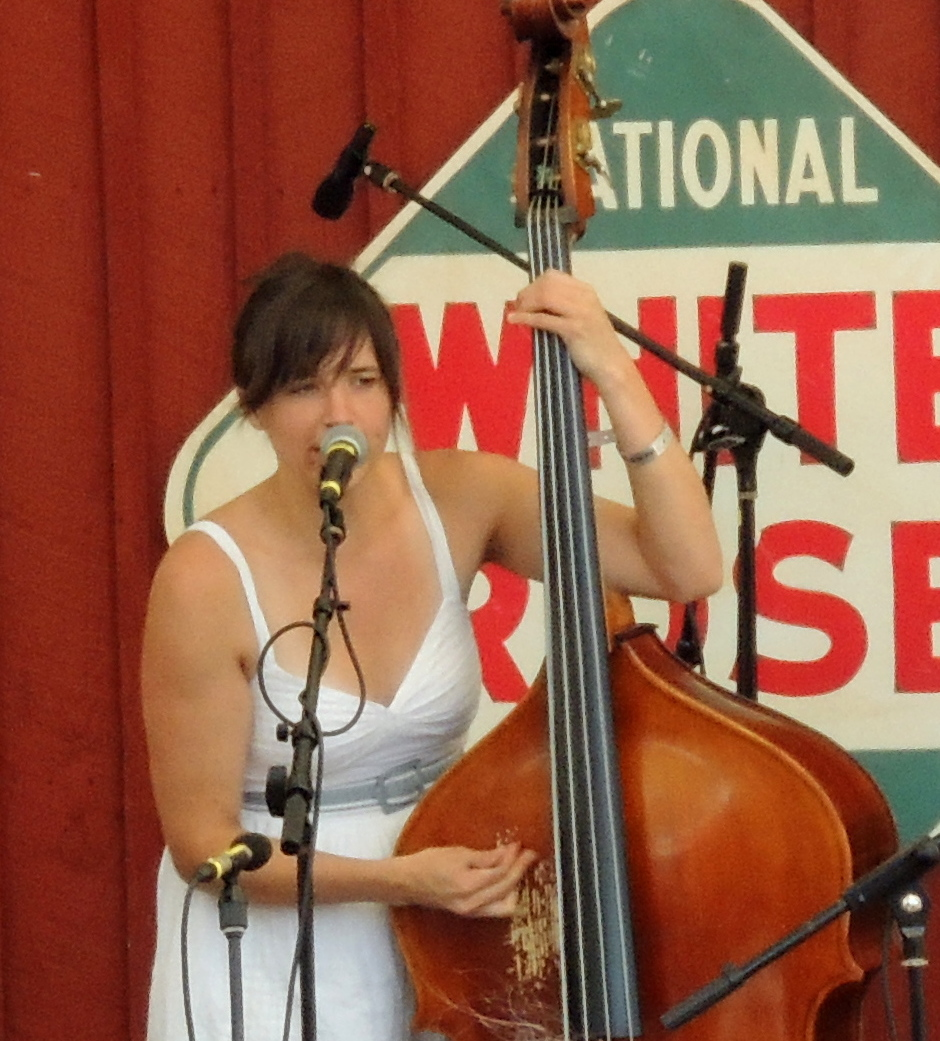
- 2012 Spring Skunk Music Festival

Background information
- Born: Bridget Ellen Kearney; June 10, 1985 (age 41); Iowa City, Iowa
- Genres: R&B; pop; indie; bluegrass
- Occupations: Musician; songwriter; vocalist; teacher; recording artist
- Instruments: Double bass; electric bass; vocals; guitar; keyboards; Moog; gyil
- Years active: 2005–present
- Labels: Signature Sounds, Nonesuch, self-released
- Member of: Lake Street Dive, Bridget Kearney and Benjamin Lazar Davis, The Bridget Kearney Band, BB Wisely
- Formerly of: Joy Kills Sorrow, Cuddle Magic
- Website: bridgetkearney.com

Bridget Kearney (kə́ːnɪj, car'-nee) is an American musician and songwriter. She is a founding member of the band Lake Street Dive and winner of the 2005 John Lennon Songwriting Contest in the Jazz category.

Kearney's solo recording work began with her debut solo album, Won't Let You Down, which recordings took place over three years, largely encouraged and supported by drummer/engineer/producer Robin MacMillan in his Brooklyn Studio, and released by Signature Sounds Recordings in 2017. A number of singles followed, some of which found their way onto Kearney's second solo album, Snakes of Paradise self-released in 2023. Similarly, singles from her third album,Comeback Kid were also released in advance of the April 12, 2024 release by Keeled Scales for that album on an expanding number of streaming platforms and social media sites such as Apple Music, Spotify, YouTube and Instagram as well as physical media outlet channels such as Bandcamp.

== Early life, influences and education ==
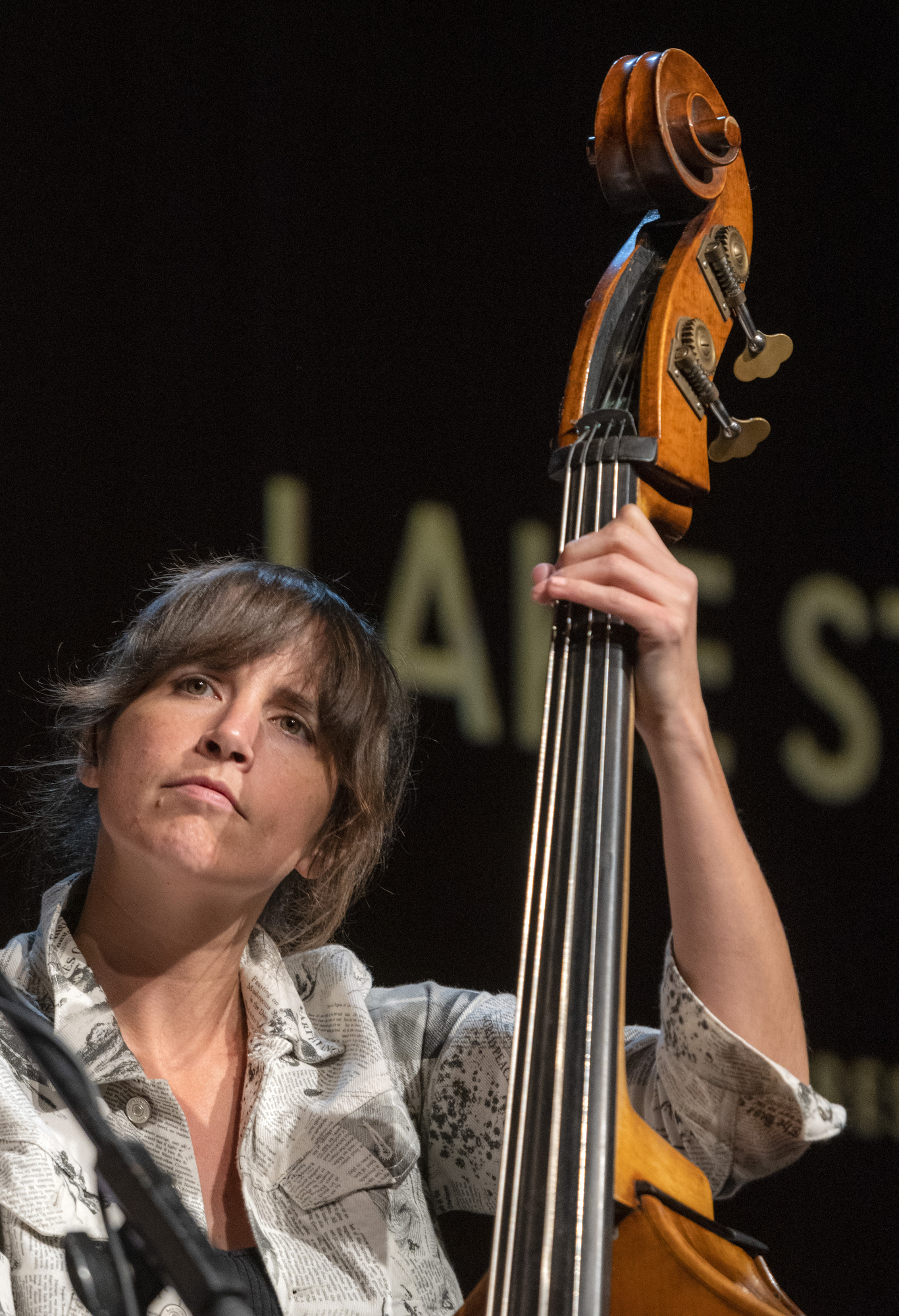
Bridget Kearney at the LBJ Presidential Library in 2022

Kearney was born and grew up in Iowa City, Iowa. Her mother played flute. Her father played bass with "Langston Hughes Memorial Eclectic Improvisational Jazz Exposition". Her grandmothers, Ellen and Vickey, were both musicians; Ellen Kearney, to whom she credits her preternatural love of low tones, played the upright bass, while Vickey, a vocalist, was a touring musician with the "Tangen Sisters". Bridget started her journey with music in the Lutheran Church's Cherub choir. Kearney took piano lessons at the age of 5 and began playing bass in the 4th grade. She listened to her parents' rock and roll records from the 1960s and gained an appreciation of the Beatles' music. In high school, she played in the school orchestras and jazz bands and was in a number of extracurricular rock and roll bands. At age 13, Kearney and her band, Metro Pilot, won a songwriting contest for a song called "Live" (verb) about the dangers of tobacco, where the prize was to perform the song in front of a live audience including keynote speaker and former United States Surgeon General C. Everett Koop. Bridget fronted the band playing electric bass and singing lead vocals.

Recalling playing bass in the fourth grade, Kearney said, "I just thought I would go with the bass that year and switch instruments the next year, but after I started playing bass and got to know it, I decided to stay with it. The cool thing is that if you’re a bass player, there’s always demand. There were points at which I was in 12 different bands." In interviews she recalls how her jazz band director in high school, Rich Medd, always made class fun saying, "I was always excited to go to jazz band rehearsal and that is one of the reasons I’m still playing music." Lake Street Dive's early 2023 "Gather Round Sounds" concert tour found Kearney returning to Iowa City for a sold-out show at the University of Iowa Hancher Auditorium on January 24, 2023, with Mr. Medd and other local music educators joining as the horn section.

Already an accomplished and devoted bass player at a young age, Kearney played electric bass through junior high school, after which her interest in jazz music and the sounds she wanted to create guided her toward playing more upright or double bass until about age 35 when Kearney began to acquire a number of electric bass guitars and other gear to expand her sound and versatility.

Kearney's knowledge, skills and innate capacity for creativity took her to a much higher musical level while studying with Mark Urness, a versatile bassist, composer, and educator in Iowa City at the time who later moved to teaching at Lawrence University in Wisconsin. Her very earliest bass influences were three bass instructors, all women, all of whom played double bass. Kearney has credited Paul Chambers, Charles Mingus and Charlie Haden as some of her main influences from her jazz study period.

In college Kearney double-majored. She earned a Bachelors of Music from the New England Conservatory of Music in Jazz Studies (bass) and a Bachelors of Arts from Tufts University in English. As a sophomore, she was a member of two bands she helped found: Joy Kills Sorrow and Lake Street Dive.

== Personal life ==
Kearney likes to travel, play tennis, and run to stay fit and raise money for her favorite charities. She often seeks adventure on the road, like surfing in Mexico and bungee jumping in New Zealand, and is a master of chipology. Her first job, during college, was selling souvenirs at Fenway Park. She once held the one-game record for selling the most (104) foam fingers during a Boston Red Sox game and humorously refers to this early career as her "fall-back, in case the music thing doesn't work out."

== Songwriting ==
As a songwriter/composer she has registered over 85 songs as a member of Broadcast Music, Inc. Of those, at least 25 are held solely by her, and the rest with different songwriters/composers and artists including Lake Street Dive, Cuddle Magic, Joy Kills Sorrow, Benjamin Lazar Davis and Margaret Glaspy. Gaining recognition as a songwriter included penning a number of songs with and for other artists, some in conjunction with Lake Street Dive which led to a Grammy nomination for Best Traditional Pop Vocal Album for their 2024 album Good Together. She credits some of her song writing acumen to authors such as Ernest Hemingway, having once been quoted as saying "A lot of my ideals as a songwriter come from novelists and poets, like Hemingway's idea that to start writing a story, all you have to do is write one true sentence. A song works that way too. You just need to find one seed, the rest will grow from there."

== Teaching ==
Kearney has taught private lessons online for charity and also taught songwriting to larger classes online with "School of Song", a community-concept based songwriting school with rotating instructors where she was also a student. She has co-taught a songwriting class with Paul Muldoon at Princeton University.

== Music production ==
Kearney's musical career spans the period from when most listeners purchased phonograph records, cassette tapes, and CDs through the birth of music streaming services, an important part of the digital revolution. Concomitant technologies which developed in parallel gave music creators, such as Kearney and others, new opportunities to create and deliver new sounds and music to larger and varied audiences on a global basis. Since the beginning of the 21st century, Kearney has been part of the revolution as a follower, participant, contributor, and leader, increasingly relying on her musical prowess to deliver contributions in popular, world, independent, and, experimental music. Kearney parlayed most advances in music production and distribution technology, including social media, to expand her craft, for her personal enjoyment, and to help others in production of their own music by contributing production elements. On April 19, 2024, the first album she produced was released; “The January Album” by the band The Brother Brothers”, their fifth album.

== Bands ==
=== Lake Street Dive ===
Kearney is a founding member of Lake Street Dive, which was founded in 2004 and started touring in 2007. She has appeared with Lake Street Dive on many national shows: The Colbert Report, The Late Show with David Letterman, Conan, The Ellen DeGeneres Show, National Public Radio, Prairie Home Companion with Garrison Keillor and on Live From Here hosted by Chris Thile. The band has uploaded numerous videos, including their annual, humorous Halloween covers, and T Bone Burnett asked them to perform on the Another Day, Another Time: Celebrating the Music of "Inside Llewyn Davis" show and album. The band has traveled and performed in almost every state in America and over a dozen foreign countries. Originally with Signature Sounds Recordings, in 2016 the band signed with Nonesuch Records and subsequently released their "Fun Machine: The Sequel EP" on Fantasy Records in September 2022.

=== Solo and backing bands ===
Kearney has appeared as a solo performer and also worked with a varying array of other musicians, producers and performers to create her own recordings, videos, and, tours, at times solely performing her own music under her own name. Other performances and tours were designed as collaborations with varying musicians each taking the lead role in arranging and performing their own songs with the other members backing and exchanging instruments. These appearances were sometimes referred to under the name of each, or all, performers.

=== Bridget Kearney and Benjamin Lazar Davis ===
Bridget Kearney and Benjamin Lazar Davis began making music together performing as "BbGun" from the time they were students together at the New England Conservatory of Music. In 2015 the two alumni teamed up to create original works which are in part a fusion of music from the west African country of Ghana and Kearney and Davis' music. Various artists, including Stevo Atambire and Aaron Bebe Sukura as well as musical instruments and cultural elements from Ghana were used by the artists from Ghana, Kearney and Davis in the making of these recordings. The results of these creative efforts are contained in two recorded music releases: "Bawa" in 2015 and "Still Flying" in 2020.

=== BB Wisely ===
Kearney launched the band BB Wisely with Benjamin Lazar Davis and Will Graefe in August 2022. The trio had been writing songs, recording and touring as a trio and alternating duo pairs for a few years prior to deciding on BB Wisely as the name of the band. The band name is a fusion of Bridget, Ben, and "Chime Wisely", a band created by Davis and guitarist Will Graefe.

=== Joy Kills Sorrow ===
Kearney was also a major songwriter and stand up bass player for Joy Kills Sorrow from 2005 to 2012. Joy Kills Sorrow was a Boston-based, indie pop, American roots, string band formed in 2005. This band released three albums before Kearney left the band to join Lake Street Dive full-time.

=== Cuddle Magic ===
Cuddle Magic is a chamber pop collective that varies in membership. Kearney has written songs for and played with Cuddle Magic.

=== The Fundies ===
The Fundies was another part-time band collaboration featuring Margaret Glaspy, Rachael Price, Brittany Haas and Kearney. Their first performance was in 2010, and they self-released an EP called The Fundies in 2012. It has been mentioned that, in retrospect, the Fundies was an all-female Super Group. Each member has gone on to launch their own, successful musical career. Each of the Fundies has played with at least one other Fundie since they parted, while some continue to do so on a regular basis. Glaspy and Haas played a Fundies reunion gig in 2015. There have been rumors of a reunion show with all of the original members.

=== Other groups and musicians ===
Kearney has played live, written for, and recorded with, a host of acts as a collaborator and backing musician, including Rodney Crowell, Ed Sheeran, Aoife O’Donovan, Margaret Glaspy, Bella White, Charlotte Cornfield and Brazilian singer Tiago Iorc.

== Discography ==
=== Albums ===
- Won't Let You Down (2017)
- Snakes of Paradise (April 21, 2023)
- Comeback Kid (April 12, 2024)

=== Singles ===
- I Bet UR (Nov 2021)
- So Badly (Dec 2021)
- Diary Fire (Feb 2022)
- All This Time (Mar 2022)
- Don't Think About the Polar Bear (Dec 2023)

=== With Lake Street Dive ===
- In This Episode (2006)
- Promises, Promises (2007)
- Live at the Lizard Lounge (Video) (2011)
- Lake Street Dive (S/T) (2011)
- Fun Machine (2012)
- Bad Self Portraits (2014)
- Side Pony (2016)
- Free Yourself Up (Early 2018)
- Freak Yourself Out (Late 2018)
- Obviously (2021)
- Fun Machine: The Sequel (EP) (Sep 2022)
- Good Together (June 21, 2024)

=== With BB Wisely ===
- Right Time (Dec 2020)
- Sam (Dec 2022)
- Coal Canary (Aug 2022)
- Vegas Nerve (Mar 2023)
- Voice of Reason (Jul 2023)
- How To Get Better (Aug 2023)
- Teddy Bear (Nov 2023)
- People Pleaser (Aug 26, 2024)
- Eaton Canyon Fire Song (Jan 7, 2026)

=== With Benjamin Lazar Davis ===
- BAWA (2015)
- Still Flying (2020)

=== With Joy Kills Sorrow ===
- Joy Kills Sorrow (2006)
- Darkness Sure Becomes This City (2010)
- This Unknown Science (2011)

=== With The Fundies ===
- The Fundies EP (2012)
