= Good Together (Lake Street Dive album) =

2024 album by Lake Street Dive

Studio album by Lake Street Dive
- Released: June 21, 2024
- Label: Fantasy; Concord Music Group

Lake Street Dive chronology
Fun Machine: The Sequel (2022)	Good Together (2024)

Good Together is a studio album by Lake Street Dive, released in 2024. The album was nominated for the 2025 Grammy Award for Best Traditional Pop Vocal Album.

== Track listing ==
Good Together track listing
No.	Title	Writer(s)	Length
1.	"Good Together"	Akie Bermiss, Mike Calabrese, Bridget Kearney, Rachael Price	3:21
2.	"Dance with a Stranger"	Bridget Kearney	3:35
3.	"Far Gone"	Akie Bermiss, Mike Calabrese, Bridget Kearney, Rachael Price	2:03
4.	"Get Around"	Akie Bermiss, Mike Calabrese, Bridget Kearney, Rachael Price	2:51
5.	"Help Is on the Way"	Akie Bermiss, Mike Calabrese, Bridget Kearney, Rachael Price	3:03
6.	"Walking Uphill"	Akie Bermiss, Mike Calabrese, Bridget Kearney,	3:16
7.	"Better Not Tell You"	Akie Bermiss	3:12
8.	"Seats at the Bar"	Mike Calabrese	3:55
9.	"Twenty-Five"	Bridget Kearney	3:02
10.	"Party on the Roof"	Bridget Kearney	3:41
11.	"Set Sail (Prometheus & Eros)"	Akie Bermiss, Bridget Kearney	4:27

== Personnel ==
- Rachael Price – primary lead vocals
- Akie Bermisss – keyboards, vocals
- Bridget Kearney – bass guitar, bass viol, vocals
- James Cornelison – guitars, backing vocals
- Mike Calabrese – drums, percussion, backing vocals
- Jon Lampley – trumpet
- Dan White – saxophones
- Chris Ott – trombone
- Rob Moose – strings, string arranger
- Abe Rounds – drums, percussion
- Mike Elizondo – producer, keyboards, drum programing
- Justin Francis – recording enggineer, mixer
- Erica Block, Alex Wilder – assistant engineers
- Chris Gehringer – mastering engineer
