= Americana Music Honors & Awards =

Marquee event for the Americana Music Association

Americana Honors & Awards
- Current: 2026 Americana Music Honors & Awards
- Awarded for: Outstanding achievements in the music industry
- Country: United States
- Presented by: Americana Music Association
- Hosted by: Jim Lauderdale (2002–2017); Milk Carton Kids (2018-19, 2023-24, 2026); John C. Reilly (2025)
- First award: 2002
- Website: americanamusic.org

Television/radio coverage
- Network: PBS (2011–present); AXS TV (2012–present)

The Americana Music Honors & Awards is the marquee event for the Americana Music Association. Beginning in 2002, the Americana Music Association honors distinguished members of the music community. Six member-voted awards and several Lifetime Achievement Awards are handed out while over 2000 artists, music-loving fans and entertainment industry executives look on.

The Honors & Awards have featured a variety of musical events, including Johnny Cash and June Carter Cash's last live performance together. Artists such as The Carolina Chocolate Drops, Robert Plant & His Band of Joy, Steve Earle & Allison Moorer, Rosanne Cash and John Fogerty have also performed for the event, and special appearances by artists like Kris Kristofferson (2003), Loretta Lynn (2004/2014), Billy Bob Thornton (2005), Bonnie Raitt (2012/2016), Dwight Yoakam (2016) and George Strait (2016) demonstrate the prestige of the genre and awards show.

The Honors & Awards show was first broadcast on national television in 2005. Also in 2005, SiriusXM, BBC2, and Voice of America began broadcasting the show on radio. PBS began airing an abbreviated version during Austin City Limits in 2011.

The Americana Honors & Awards Show returned to the historic Ryman Auditorium on September 12, 2012. It was once again hosted by Jim Lauderdale, while the All Star Band was led by Buddy Miller. The 2012 Honors & Awards show was aired live on AXS TV and later aired on Austin City Limits on PBS and replayed on AXS TV. Lauderdale stepped down from hosting duties after the 2017 ceremony and the 2018–19 Honors & Awards were hosted by The Milk Carton Kids. The show did not include a host in 2021.

== Nomination process ==
The eligibility period for the Americana Music Association's “Of The Year” categories typically runs from April 1 through March 31 of the following year. Only active members of the Americana Music Association may participate in the nomination and election process. The winners are announced at the annual Americana Music Honors & Awards show.

Below are the Criteria for each of the following categories:

- Album of the Year – Americana albums released during the eligibility period.
- Song of the Year – Americana songs released from Albums released during the eligibility period.
- Artist of the Year – An Artist who has had an exemplary year based on overall recognition and activity whether through album, song, radio airplay, publicity, touring, or other criteria within the eligibility period.
- Emerging Act of the Year – Solo artist, duo, or group having an exemplary year and first blush of national public awareness through overall recognition and activity, whether through album, song, radio airplay, sales, publicity, touring, or other criteria during eligibility period who has not previously been nominated in any category.
- Duo/Group of the Year – Duo/Group – have had an exemplary year based on overall recognition and activity, whether through album, song, radio airplay, publicity, touring, or other criteria within the eligibility period.
- Instrumentalist of the Year : An award given to a collaborative musician having an exemplary year within the eligibility period based on overall recognition and activity, whether through work on an album, song, touring, or other criteria.

== Competitive awards ==
All awards history information is also available on the Americana Music Association's website.

=== Album of the Year ===
Year	Recipient	Work	Nominees	Ref.
2025	Nathaniel Rateliff & The Night Sweats; produced by Brad Cook	South of Here	Lonesome Drifter - Charley Crockett; Foxes in the Snow - Jason Isbell; Manning Fireworks - MJ Lenderman; Woodland - David Rawlings and Gillian Welch	
2024	Sierra Ferrell; produced by Eddie Spear & Gary Paczosa	Trail of Flowers	Brandy Clark - Brandy Clark; The Past Is Still Alive - Hurray for the Riff Raff; Rustin' in the Rain - Tyler Childers; Weathervanes - Jason Isbell and the 400 Unit	
2023	Tyler Childers	Can I Take My Hounds to Heaven?	Big Time - Angel Olsen; El Bueno y el Malo - Hermanos Gutiérrez; The Man from Waco - Charley Crockett; Strays - Margo Price	
2022	Allison Russell, produced by Dan Knobler	Outside Child	Brandi Carlile - In These Silent Days; Robert Plant & Alison Krauss - Raise The Roof; Adia Victoria - A Southern Gothic; Yola - Stand for Myself	
2021	Sturgill Simpson, Produced by David Ferguson & Sturgill Simpson	Cuttin’ Grass - Vol. 1 (Butcher Shoppe Sessions)	Steve Earle & the Dukes - J.T; Valerie June - The Moon and Stars: Prescriptions for Dreamers; Jason Isbell and the 400 Unit - Reunions; Sarah Jarosz - World on the Ground	
2020	The Highwomen, Produced by Dave Cobb	The Highwomen	Nathaniel Rateliff - And It's Still Alright; Tyler Childers - Country Squire; Brittany Howard - Jaime; Tanya Tucker - While I'm Livin'	
2019	John Prine, Produced by Dave Cobb	The Tree of Forgiveness	Amanda Shires - To the Sunset; Lori McKenna - The Tree; Yola - Walk Through Fire	
2018	Jason Isbell and the 400 Unit, Produced by Dave Cobb	The Nashville Sound	Margo Price - All-American Made; Brandi Carlile - By the Way, I Forgive You; Mary Gauthier - Rifles & Rosary Beads	
2017	Sturgill Simpson, Produced by Sturgill Simpson	A Sailor's Guide To Earth	Drive-By Truckers - American Band; Rodney Crowell - Close Ties; Rhiannon Giddens - Freedom Highway; Hurray For The Riff Raff - The Navigator	
2016	Jason Isbell, Produced by Dave Cobb	Something More Than Free	Lucinda Williams - The Ghosts of Highway 20; Parker Millsap - The Very Last Day; Chris Stapleton - Traveller	
2015	Lucinda Williams, Produced by Lucinda Williams, Tom Overby, and Greg Leisz	Down Where The Spirit Meets The Bone	Shakey Graves - And The War Came; Sturgill Simpson - Metamodern Sounds in Country Music; Lee Ann Womack - The Way I'm Livin'; Rhiannon Giddens - Tomorrow Is My Turn	
2014	Jason Isbell, Produced by Dave Cobb	Southeastern	Robert Ellis - The Lights From The Chemical Plant; Rosanne Cash - The River And The Thread; Sarah Jarosz - Build Me Up From Bones	
2013	Emmylou Harris & Rodney Crowell, Produced by Brian Ahern	Old Yellow Moon	Buddy Miller & Jim Lauderdale - Buddy & Jim; Kelly Willis & Bruce Robison - Cheaters Game; John Fullbright - From The Ground Up; Shovels & Rope - O’ Be Joyful	
2012	Various Artists, Produced by Tamara Saviano	This One's For Him: A Tribute to Guy Clark	Jason Isbell & The 400 Unit - Here We Rest; Steve Earle - I'll Never Get Out of this World Alive; Gillian Welch - The Harrow & The Harvest	
2011	Robert Plant, Produced by Robert Plant and Buddy Miller	Band of Joy	Elizabeth Cook - Welder; Justin Townes Earle - Harlem River Blues; Lucinda Williams - Blessed	
2010	Rosanne Cash, Produced by John Leventhal	The List	Dave Rawlings Machine - A Friend of a Friend; Patty Griffin - Downtown Church; Ray Wylie Hubbard - A. Enlightenment B. Endarkenment (Hint: There Is No C)	
2009	Buddy & Julie Miller, Produced by Buddy & Julie Miller	Written In Chalk	Alejandro Escovedo - Real Animal; Jason Isbell & The 400 Unit - Jason Isbell & The 400 Unit; Justin Townes Earle - Midnight At The Movies	
2008	Alison Krauss & Robert Plant, Produced by T Bone Burnett	Raising Sand	Hayes Carll - Trouble In Mind; James McMurtry - Just Us Kids; Levon Helm - Dirt Farmer	
2007	Patty Griffin, Produced by Griffin McCarthy and Mike McCarthy	Children Running Through	Avett Brothers - Emotionalism; Bob Dylan - Modern Times; Lucinda Williams - West	
2006	James McMurtry, Produced by James McMurtry	Childish Things	Delbert McClinton - Cost of Living; Marty Stuart & His Fabulous Superlatives - Soul's Chapel; Rodney Crowell - The Outsider	
2005	Buddy Miller, Produced by Buddy Miller	Universal United House of Prayer	Steve Earle - The Revolution Starts… Now; Mary Gauthier - Mercy Now; Tift Merritt - Tambourine	
2004	Loretta Lynn, Produced by Jack White	Van Lear Rose	Mindy Smith - One Moment More; Rodney Crowell - Fate's Right Hand; Slaid Cleaves - Wishbones	
2003	Johnny Cash, Produced by Rick Rubin	American IV: The Man Comes Around	Kathleen Edwards - Failer; The Jayhawks - Rainy Day Music; Buddy Miller - Midnight & Lonesome	
2002	Buddy & Julie Miller, Produced by Buddy & Julie Miller	Buddy & Julie Miller	Gillian Welch - Time (The Revelator); The Flatlanders - Now Again; Various Artists - Caught In The Webb: Tribute to Webb Pierce	

=== Song of the Year ===
Year	Recipients	Work	Nominees	Ref
2022	Brandi Carlile, written by Brandi Carlile, Dave Cobb, Phil Hanseroth and Tim Hanseroth	"Right on Time"	“Canola Fields” - James McMurty, written by James McMurtry; “Diamond Studded Shoes” - Yola, written by Dan Auerbach, Natalie Hemby, Aaron Lee Tasjan and Yola; “Juanita” - Sturgill Simpson feat. Willie Nelson, written by Sturgill Simpson; “Persephone” - Allison Russell, written by JT Nero and Allison Russell	
2021	John Prine, written by Pat McLaughlin and John Prine	"I Remember Everything"	“Black Myself” - Amythyst Kiah, written by Amythyst Kiah; “Call Me a Fool” - Valarie June ft. Carla Thomas, written by Valarie June; "Dreamsicle" - Jason Isbell and the 400 Unit, written by Jason Isbell; "Long Violent History" - Tyler Childers, written by Tyler Childers	
2020	The Highwomen, written by Brandi Carlile, Natalie Hemby, and Lori McKenna	"Crowded Table"	“And It's Still Alright” - Nathaniel Rateliff, written by Nathaniel Rateliff; “Bring My Flowers Now” - Tanya Tucker, written by Brandi Carlile, Phil Hanseroth, Tim Hanseroth and Tanya Tucker; “My Love Will Not Change” - Aubrie Sellers feat. Steve Earle, written by Billy Burnette and Shawn Camp; “Stay High” - Brittany Howard, written by Brittany Howard; “Thoughts and Prayers” - Drive-By Truckers, written by Patterson Hood	
2019	John Prine, written by Pat McLaughlin and John Prine	"Summer's End"	“By Degrees” - Mark Erelli, Rosanne Cash, Sheryl Crow, Lori McKenna, Anais Mitchell and Josh Ritter, written by Mark Erelli; “Mockingbird” - Ruston Kelly, written by Ruston Kelly; “People Get Old” - Lori McKenna, written by Lori McKenna	
2018	Jason Isbell, written by Jason Isbell	"If We Were Vampires"	“A Little Pain” - Margo Price, written by Margo Price; “All the Trouble” - Lee Ann Womack, written by Waylon Payne, Lee Ann Womack and Adam Wright; “The Joke” - Brandi Carlile, written by Brandi Carlile, Dave Cobb, Phil Hanseroth and Tim Hanseroth	
2017	Rodney Crowell, written by Rodney Crowell	"It Ain't Over Yet"	“All Around You” - Sturgill Simpson, written by Sturgill Simpson; “To Be Without You” - Ryan Adams, written by Ryan Adams; “Wreck You” - Lori McKenna, written by Lori McKenna & Felix McTeigue	
2016	Jason Isbell, written by Jason Isbell	"24 Frames"	“Dime Store Cowgirl” - Kacey Musgraves, written by Kacey Musgraves, Luke Laird, Shane McAnally; “Hands Of Time” - Margo Price, written by Margo Price; “S.O.B.” - Nathaniel Rateliff & The Nightsweats, written by Nathaniel Rateliff	
2015	Sturgill Simpson, written by Sturgill Simpson	"Turtles All The Way Down"	“Dearly Departed” - Shakey Graves, written by Alejandro Rose-Garcia and Esme Patterson; “East Side Of Town” - Lucinda Williams, written by Lucinda Williams; “Terms Of My Surrender” - John Hiatt, written by John Hiatt; “You're The Best Lover That I Ever Had” - Steve Earle & the Dukes, written by Steve Earle	
2014	Jason Isbell, written by Jason Isbell	"Cover Me Up"	“The Lights From The Chemical Plant” - Robert Ellis, written by Robert Ellis; “The River And The Thread” - Rosanne Cash, written by Rosanne Cash & John Leventhal; “Build Me Up From Bones” - Sarah Jarosz, written by Sarah Jarosz	
2013	Shovels & Rope, written by Shovels & Rope	"Birmingham"	“Good Things Happen to Bad People” - Richard Thompson, written by Richard Thompson; “Ho Hey” - The Lumineers, written by Jeremy Fraites & Wesley Keith Schultz; “North Side Gal” - JD McPherson, written by JD McPherson	
2012	Jason Isbell, written by Jason Isbell	“Alabama Pines”	“Come Around” - Sarah Jarosz, written by Sarah Jarosz; “I Love” - Patty Griffin, written by Tom T. Hall; “Waitin’ On The Sky” - Steve Earle, written by Steve Earle	
2011	Justin Townes Earle, written by Justin Townes Earle	“Harlem River Blues”	“Down By The Water” - The Decemberists, written by Colin Meloy; “El Camino” - Elizabeth Cook, written by Elizabeth Cook; “KMAG YOYO” - Hayes Carll, written by Hayes Carll, Scott Davis & John Evans	
2010	Ryan Bingham, written by Ryan Bingham and T-Bone Burnett	"The Weary Kind"	“Drunken Poet's Dream” - Ray Wylie Hubbard, written by Hayes Carll & Ray Wylie Hubbard; “Ruby” - Dave Rawlings Machine, written by Dave Rawlings & Gillian Welch; “I and Love and You” - Avett Brothers, written by Avett Brothers	
2009	Julie Miller, written by Julie Miller	"Chalk"	“Country Love” - Gourds, written by Kevin Russell; “Homeland Refugee” - Flatlanders, written by Joe Ely, Jimmie Dale Gilmore & Butch Hancock; “Rattlin’ Bones” - Kasey Chambers & Shane Nicholson, written by Kasey Chambers & Shane Nicholson; “Sex & Gasoline” - Rodney Crowell, written by Rodney Crowell	
2008	Hayes Carll, written by Brian Keane and Hayes Carll	"She Left Me for Jesus"	“Broken” - Tift Merritt, written by Tift Merritt; “Cheney's Toy” - James McMurtry, written by James McMurtry; “Gone Gone Gone” - Alison Krauss & Robert Plant, written by Phil & Don Everly; “Poor Old Dirt Farmer” - Levon Helm, written by Tracy Schwarz	
2007	Darrell Scott, written by Darrell Scott	"Hank Williams' Ghost"	“It Takes Balls To Be A Woman” - Elizabeth Cook, written by Elizabeth Cook & Melinda Schneider; “Are You Alright?” - Lucinda Williams, written by Lucinda Williams; “Heavenly Day” - Patty Griffin, written by Patty Griffin	
2006	James McMurtry, written by James McMurtry	"We Can't Make It Here"	“Black Cadillac” - Rosanne Cash, written by Rosanne Cash; “Don't Get Me Started” - Rodney Crowell, written by Rodney Crowell; “Not Ready To Make Nice” - Dixie Chicks, written by Martie Maguire, Natalie Maines, Emily Robison & Dan Wilson	
2005	Mark Heard, written by Mark Heard	"Worry Too Much"	“Good Hearted Man” - Tift Merritt, written by Tift Merritt; “Mercy Now” - Mary Gauthier, written by Mary Gauthier; “The Revolution Starts… Now” - Steve Earle, written by Steve Earle	
2004	Rodney Crowell, written by Rodney Crowell	"Fate's Right Hand"	“Portland, Oregon” - Loretta Lynn, written by Loretta Lynn; “Come To Jesus” - Mindy Smith, written by Mindy Smith; “Wishbones” - Slaid Cleaves, written by Slaid Cleaves & Ray Wylie Hubbard	
2003	Johnny Cash, written by Trent Reznor	"Hurt"	“Truth #2” - Dixie Chicks, written by Patty Griffin; “You Can't Take It With You When You Go” - Rhonda Vincent, written by T.J. Knight & Curtis Wright; “Righteously” - Lucinda Williams, written by Lucinda Williams	
2002	Jim Lauderdale, written by Jim Lauderdale	"She's Looking At Me"	“She's Looking At Me” - Jim Lauderdale, Ralph Stanley & The Clinch Mountain Boys; “Heather's All Bummed Out” - Lonesome Bob; “I Want To Sing That Rock And Roll” - Gillian Welch & Dave Rawlings; “My Wildest Dreams” - The Flatlanders	

=== Artist of the Year ===
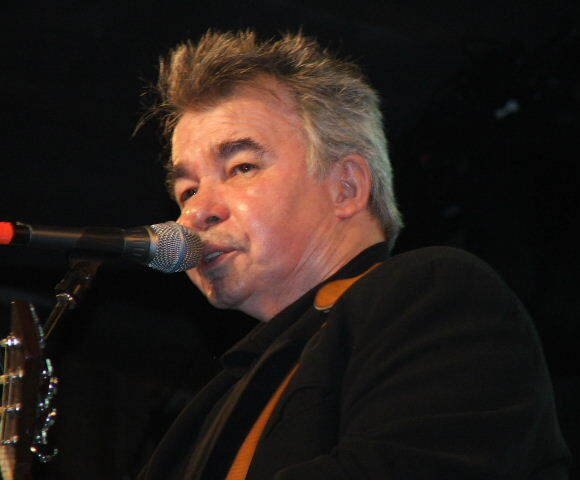
John Prine has been named artist of the year in 2005, 2017 and 2018

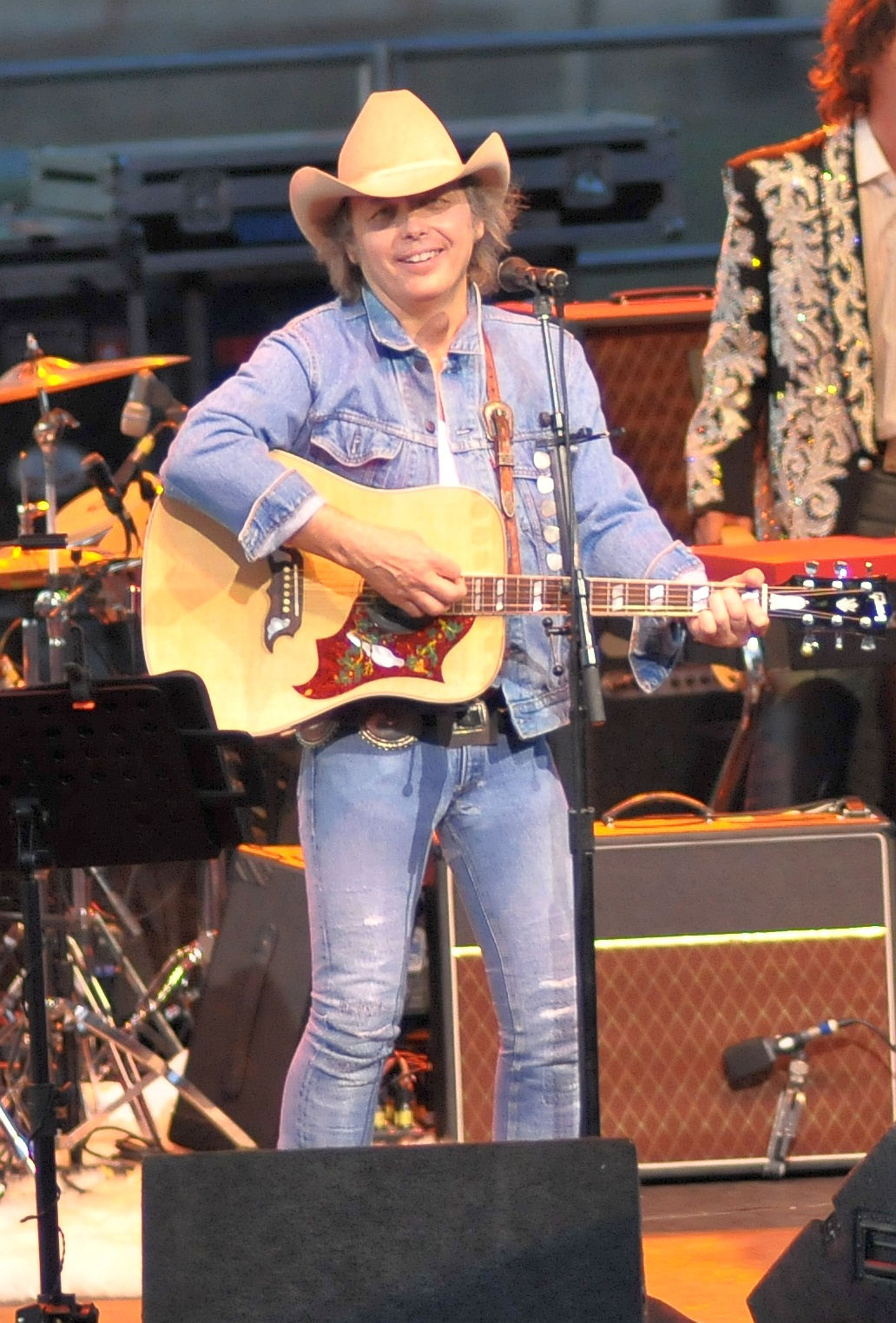
2013 recipient Dwight Yoakam

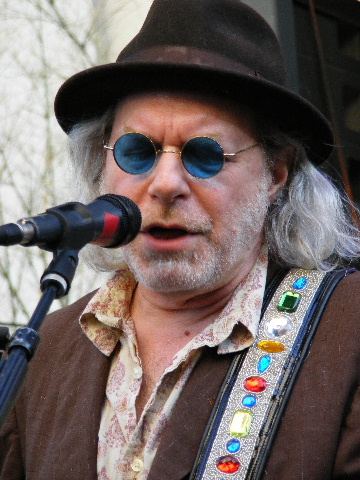
Buddy Miller is the first person to win artist of the year twice

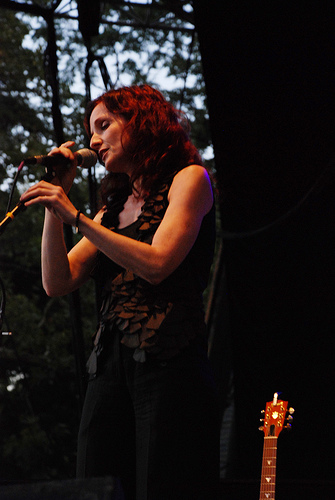
2007 winner Patty Griffin

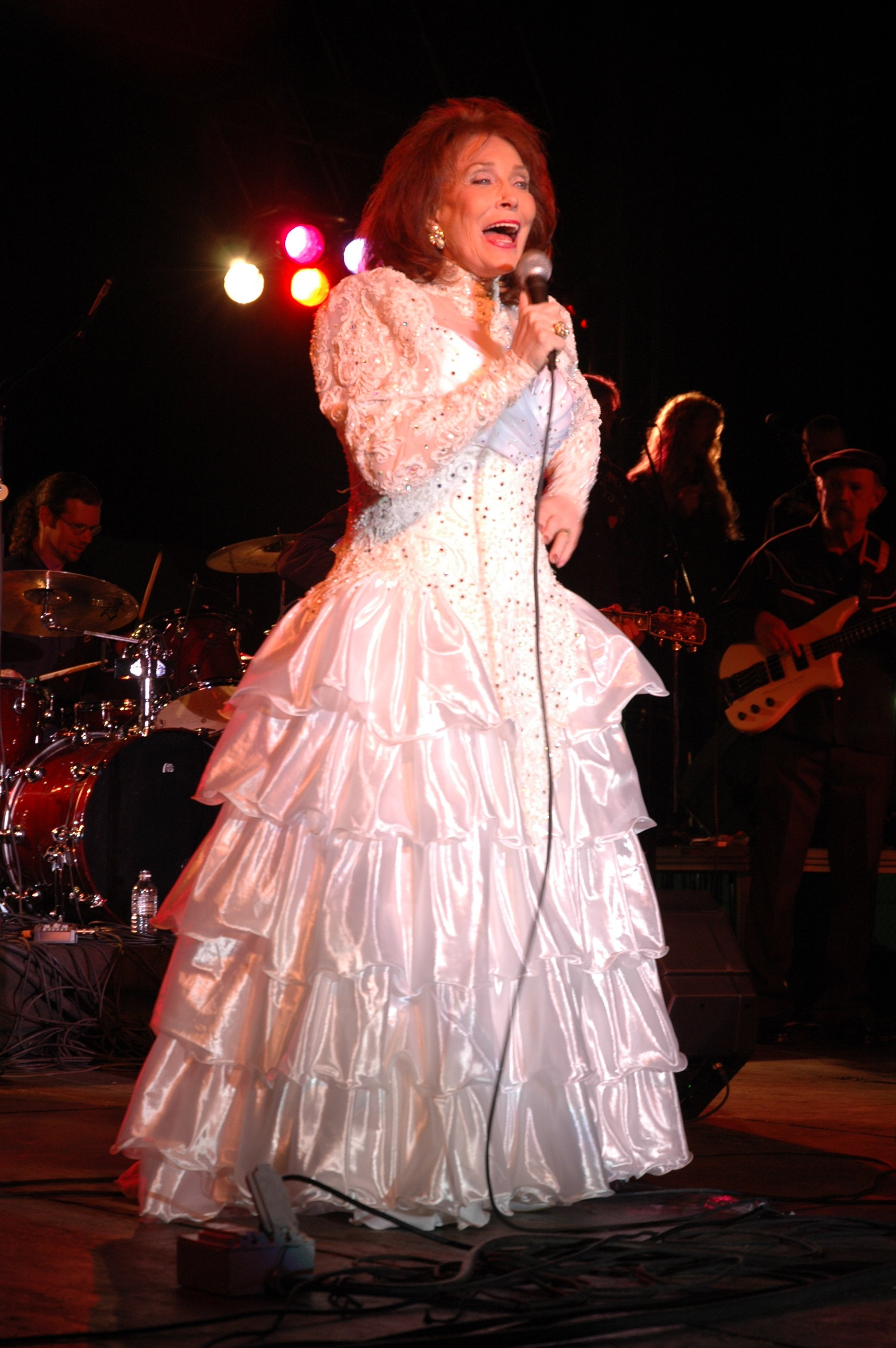
Pioneering country singer Loretta Lynn was named artist of the year in 2004

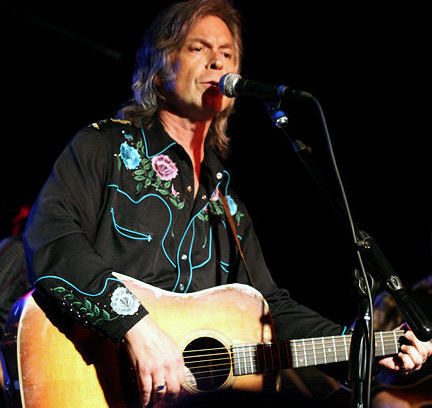
Inaugural winner Jim Lauderdale has hosted the awards since its inception

Year	Recipient	Nominees	Ref.
2025	Sierra Ferrell	Charley Crockett; Joy Oladokun; Billy Strings; Waxahatchee	
2024	Sierra Ferrell	Tyler Childers; Charley Crockett; Noah Kahan; Allison Russell	
2023	Billy Strings	Charley Crockett; Sierra Ferrell; Margo Price; Allison Russell	
2022	Billy Strings	Brandi Carlile; Allison Russell; Jason Isbell; Yola	
2021	Brandi Carlile	Kathleen Edwards; Jason Isbell; Margo Price; Billy Strings	
2020	John Prine	Brandi Carlile; Brittany Howard; Tanya Tucker; Yola	
2019	Brandi Carlile	Rhiannon Giddens; Kacey Musgraves; Mavis Staples	
2018	John Prine	Brandi Carlile; Jason Isbell; Margo Price	
2017	John Prine	Jason Isbell; Lori McKenna; Margo Price; Sturgill Simpson	
2016	Chris Stapleton	Jason Isbell; Bonnie Raitt; Lucinda Williams	
2015	Sturgill Simpson	Rhiannon Giddens; Jason Isbell; Lucinda Williams; Lee Ann Womack	
2014	Jason Isbell	Rosanne Cash; Rodney Crowell; Robert Ellis	
2013	Dwight Yoakam	Emmylou Harris; Buddy Miller; Richard Thompson	
2012	Gillian Welch	Hayes Carll; Justin Townes Earle; Jason Isbell	
2011	Buddy Miller	Hayes Carll; Elizabeth Cook; Robert Plant	
2010	Ryan Bingham	Steve Earle; Patty Griffin; Levon Helm; Ray Wylie Hubbard	
2009	Buddy Miller	Justin Townes Earle; Alejandro Escovedo; Raul Malo	
2008	Levon Helm	Steve Earle; Jim Lauderdale; James McMurtry	
2007	Patty Griffin	Joe Ely; Todd Snider; Lucinda Williams	
2006	Neil Young	Rosanne Cash; James McMurtry; Marty Stuart	
2005	John Prine	Steve Earle; Tift Merritt; Buddy Miller	
2004	Loretta Lynn	Patty Griffin; Jim Lauderdale; Allison Moorer	
2003	Johnny Cash	Kathleen Edwards; Alison Krauss; Lucinda Williams	
2002	Jim Lauderdale	The Flatlanders; Buddy & Julie Miller; Gillian Welch & David Rawlings	

=== Duo/Group of the Year ===
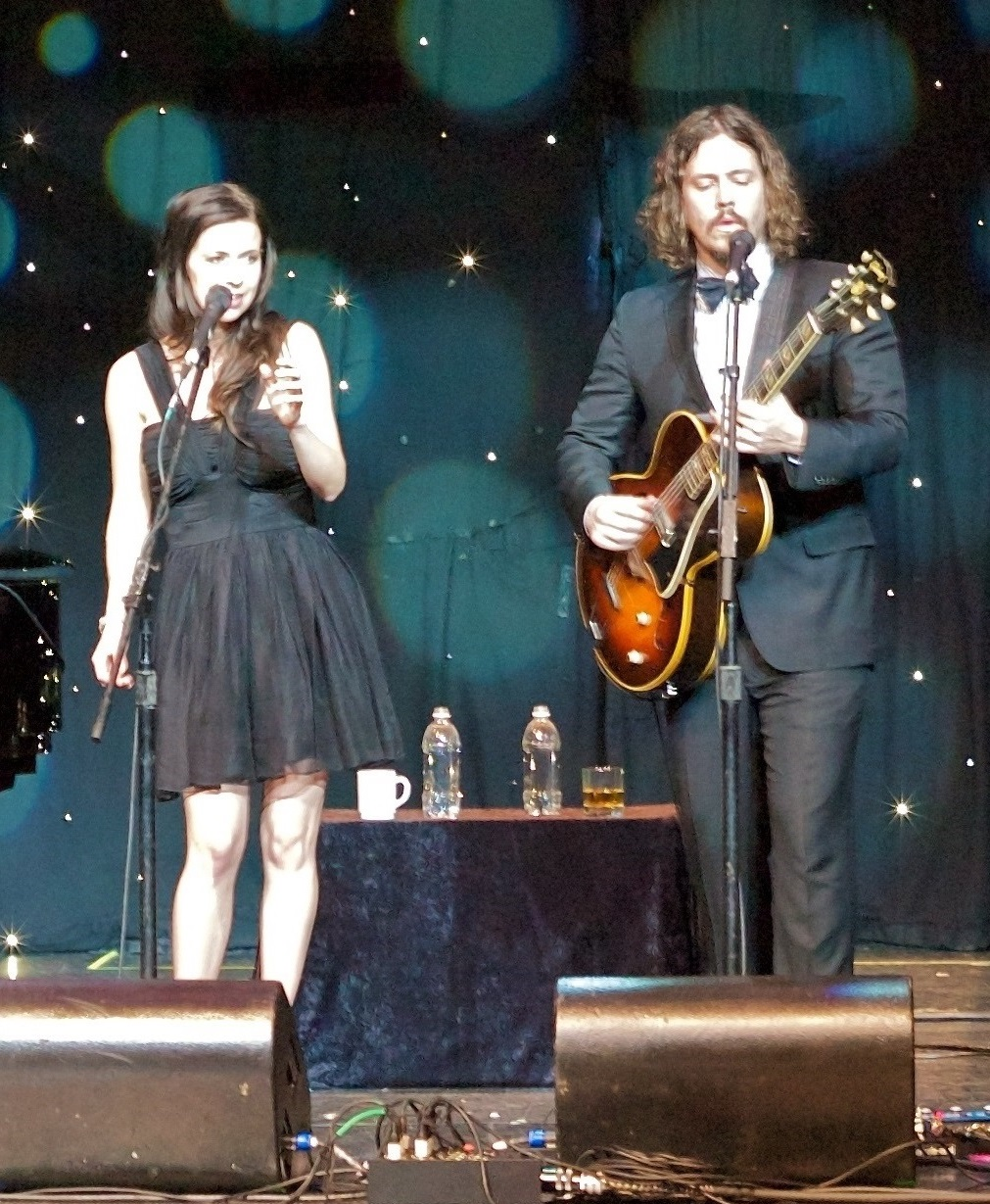
2012 winners The Civil Wars

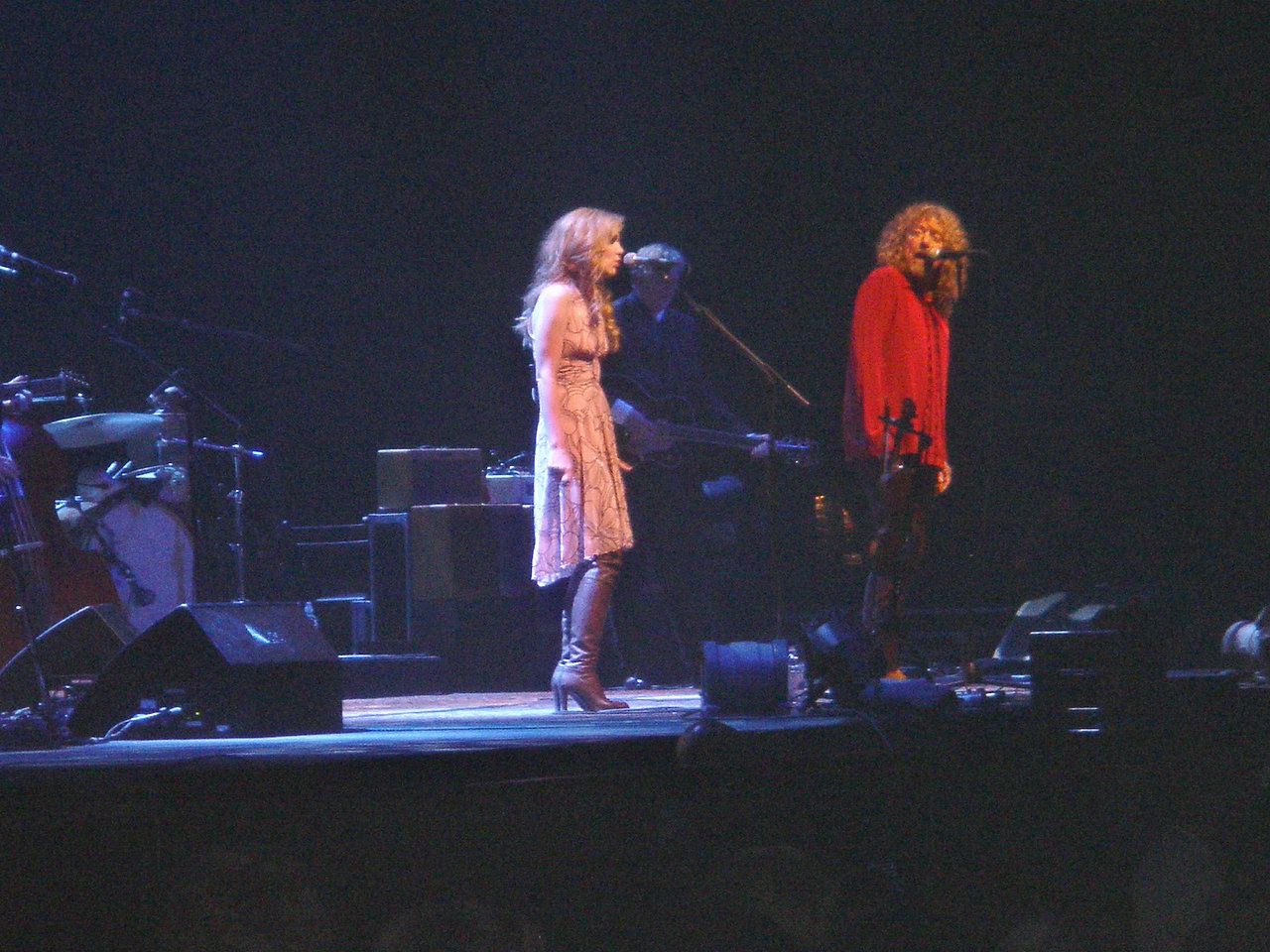
Bluegrass singer Alison Krauss and rocker Robert Plant won in 2008

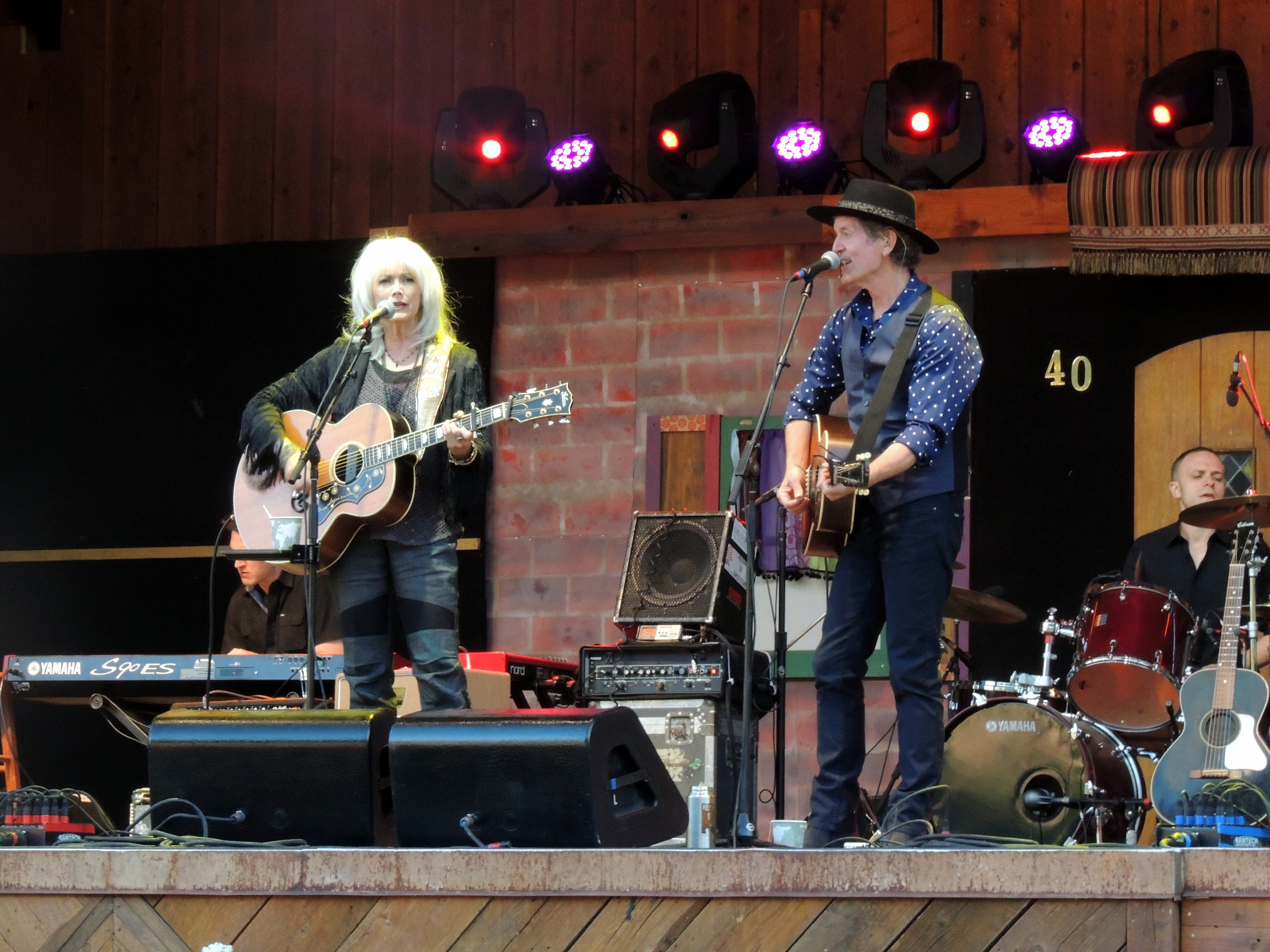
Two-time winners Emmylou Harris and Rodney Crowell

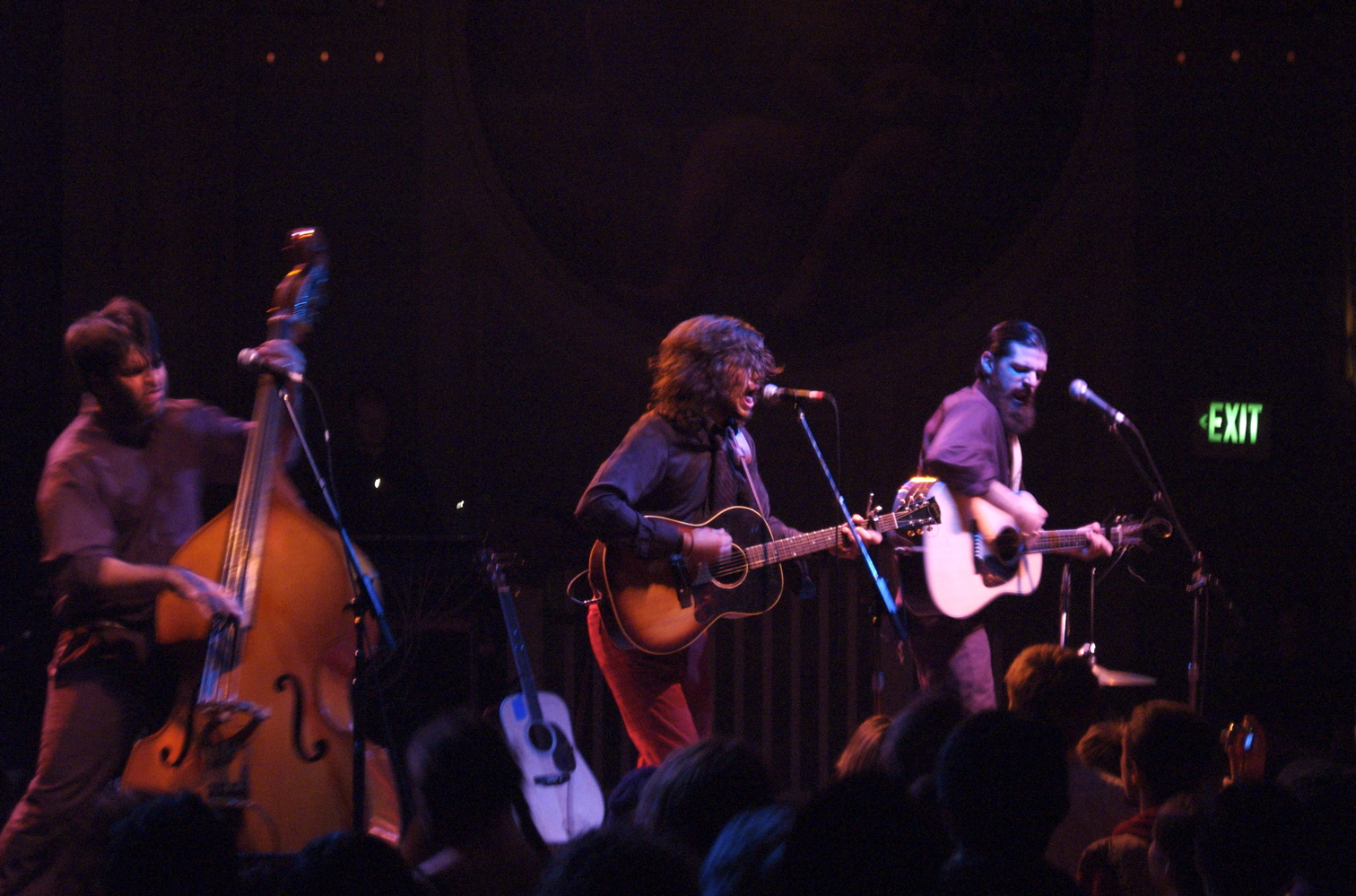
The Avett Brothers are the most awarded with three wins

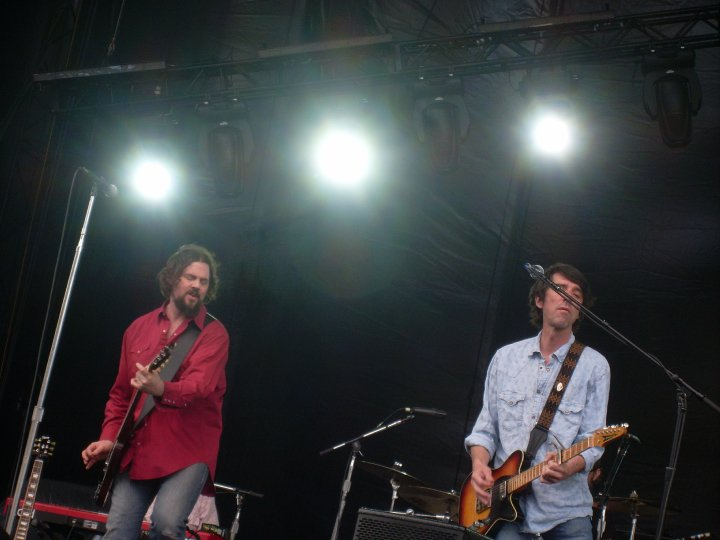
Inaugural recipients Drive-By Truckers

Year	Duo/Group	Ref.
2022	The War and Treaty	
2021	Black Pumas	
2020	The Highwomen	
2019	I'm with Her	
2018	Jason Isbell and the 400 Unit	
2017	Marty Stuart and his Fabulous Superlatives	
2016	Emmylou Harris and Rodney Crowell	
2015	The Mavericks	
2014	The Milk Carton Kids	
2013	Emmylou Harris and Rodney Crowell	
2012	The Civil Wars	
2011	The Avett Brothers	
2010	The Avett Brothers	
2009	Buddy & Julie Miller	
2008	Alison Krauss & Robert Plant	
2007	The Avett Brothers	
2006	Drive-By Truckers (first year)	

=== Instrumentalist of the Year ===
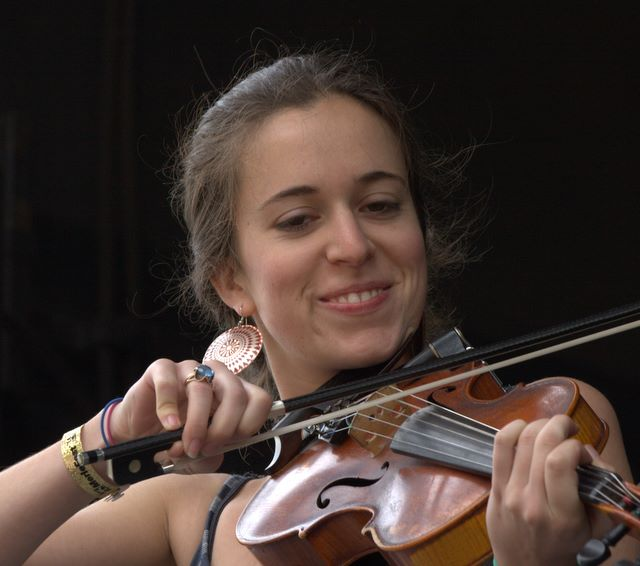
2020 recipient Brittany Haas is the second fiddle player to win

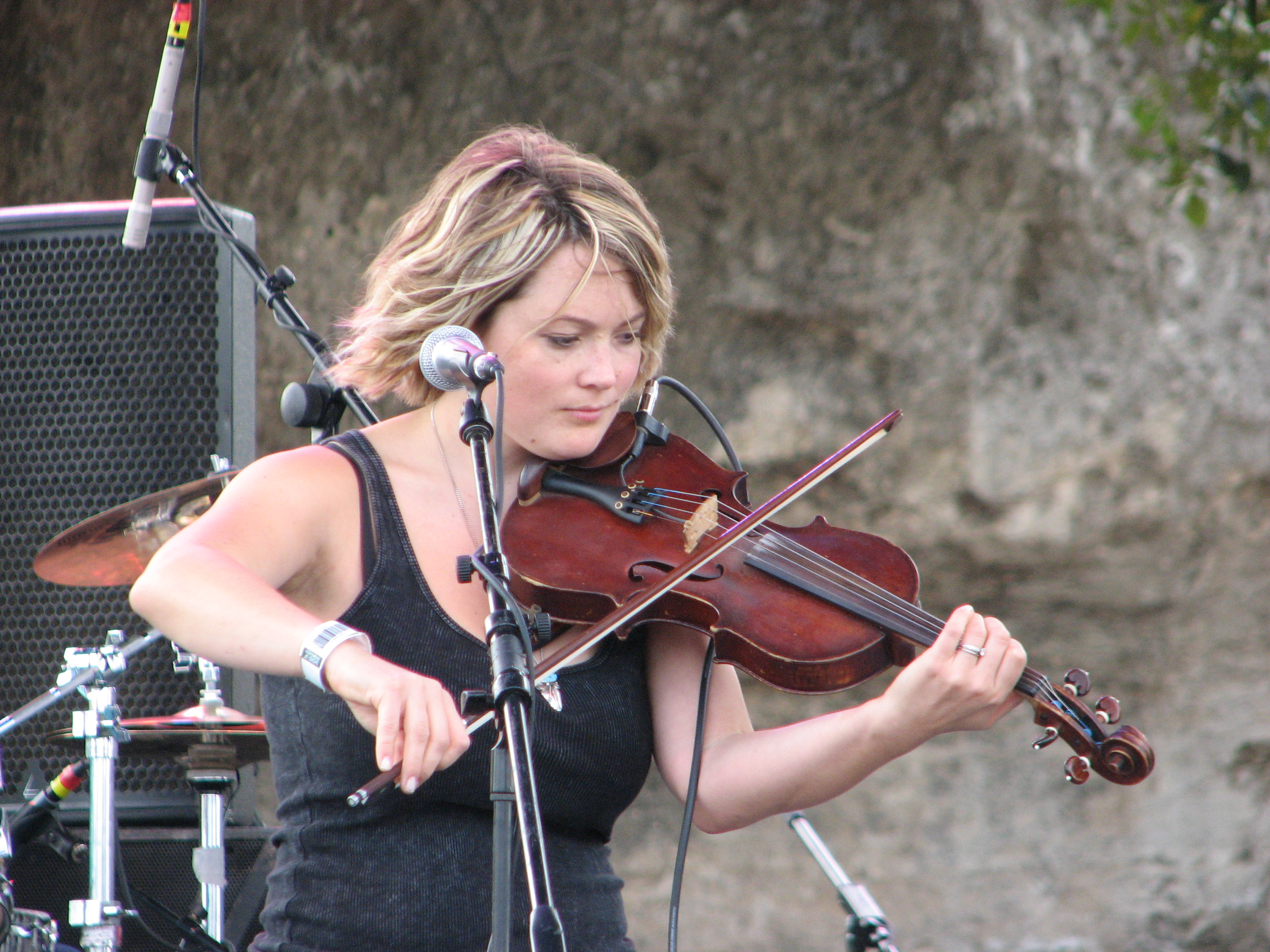
2016 winner Sara Watkins is the first female instrumentalist of the year

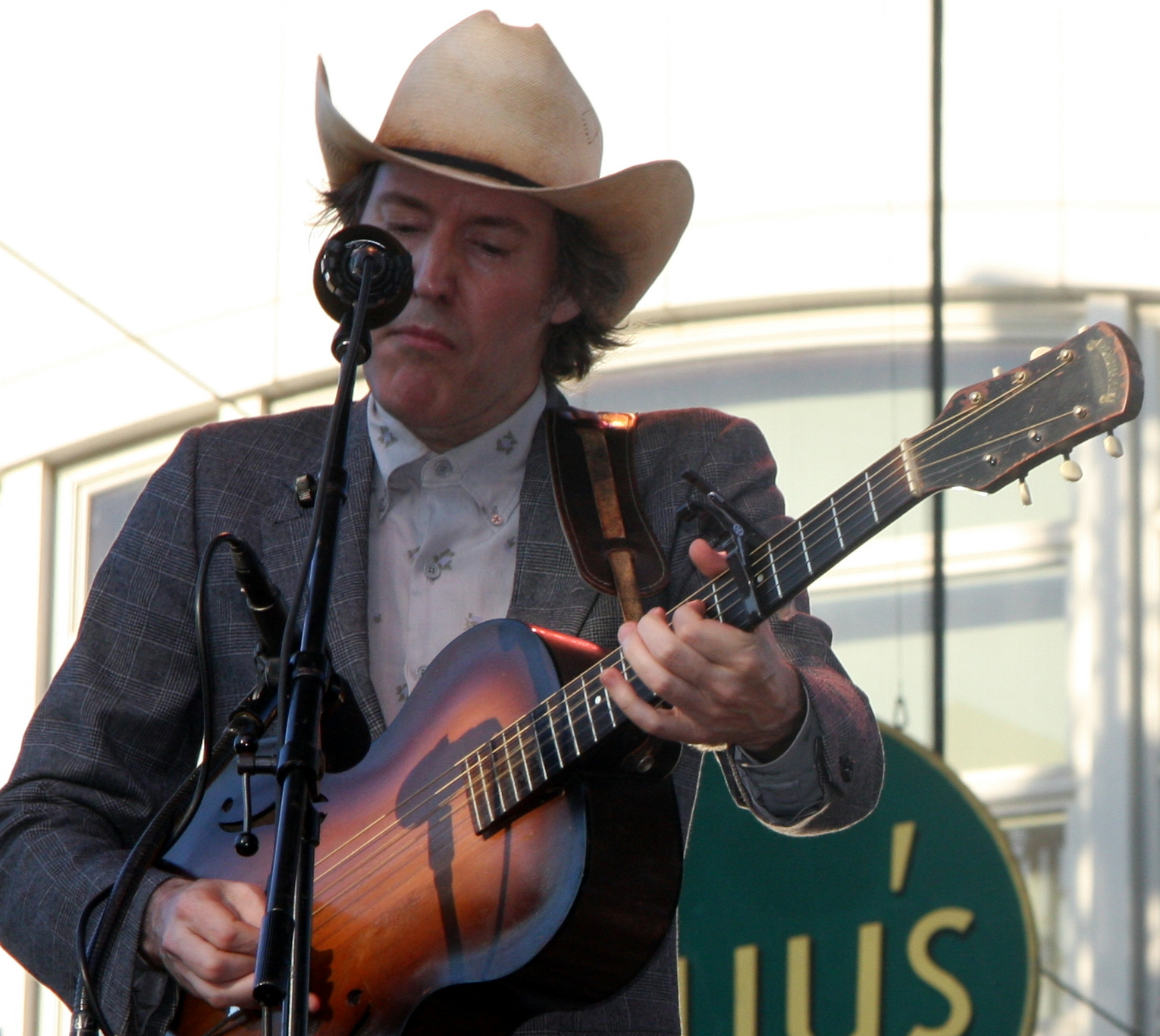
2012 recipient David Rawlings is famous for his work with Gillian Welch

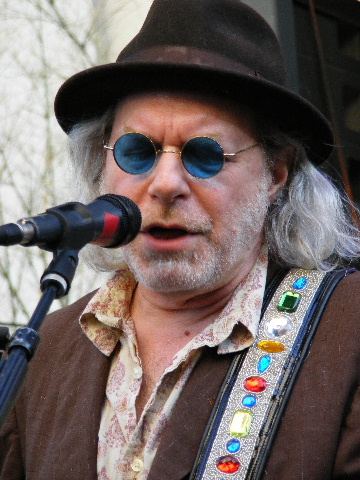
Buddy Miller is the most awarded musician with five wins

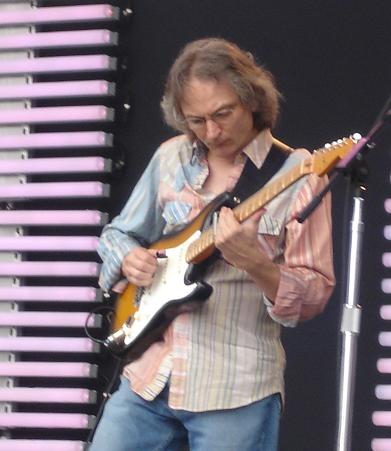
Slide guitarist Sonny Landreth received the award in 2005

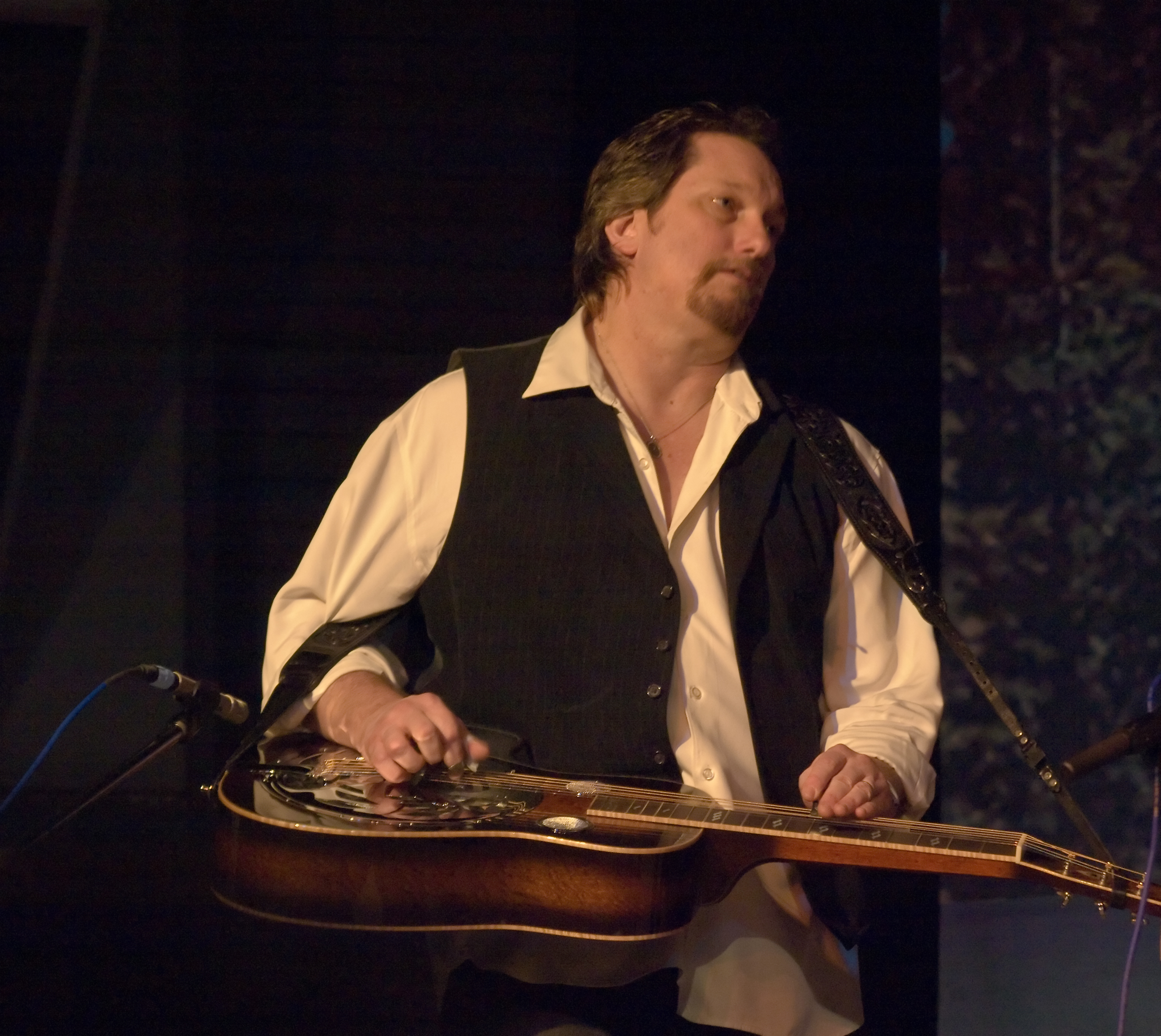
Inaugural winner Jerry Douglas

Year	Recipient	Nominees	Ref.
2025	Alex Hargreaves (fiddle)	Fred Eltringham (drums); Megan Jane (drums); Kaitlyn Raitz (cello); Seth Taylor (guitar)	
2024	Grace Bowers (guitar)	Maddie Denton (fiddle); Jamie Dick (drums); Megan McCormick (multiple instruments); Joshua Rilko (mandolin)	
2023	SistaStrings - Chauntee (violin) and Monique Ross (cello)	Isa Burke (multiple instruments); Allison De Groot (banjo); Jeff Picker (bass); Kyle Tuttle (banjo)	
2022	Larissa Maestro (cello)	Ethan Ballinger (multiple instruments); B.E. Farrow (multiple instruments); Shelby Means (bass); Justin Moses (multiple instruments)	
2021	Kristin Weber (fiddle)	Megan Coleman (drums); Robbie Crowell (multiple instruments); Ray Jacildo (keyboards); Philip Towns (keyboards)	
2020	Brittany Haas (fiddle)	Ellen Angelico (multiple instruments); Annie Clements (bass); Zachariah Hickman (bass); Rich Hinman (pedal steel)	
2019	Chris Eldridge (guitar)	Eamon McLoughlin (fiddle); Chris Powell (drums); Michael Rinne (bass)	
2018	Molly Tuttle (guitar)	Daniel Donato (guitar); Brittany Haas (fiddle); Jerry Pentecost (drums)	
2017	Charlie Sexton (guitar)	Spencer Cullum Jr. (pedal steel); Jen Gunderman (keyboards); Courtney Hartman (guitar)	
2016	Sara Watkins (fiddle)	Cindy Cashdollar (multiple instruments); Stuart Duncan (multiple instruments); Greg Leisz (multiple instruments)	
2015	John Leventhal (guitar)	Hubby Jenkins (multiple instruments); Laur Joamets (guitar); Greg Leisz (multiple instruments); Stuart Mathis (guitar)	
2014	Buddy Miller (guitar)	Larry Campbell (guitar); Fats Kaplin (multiple instruments); Bryan Sutton (multiple instruments)	
2013	Larry Campbell (guitar)	Jay Bellerose (drums); Mike Bub (bass); Doug Lancio (guitar); Greg Leisz (multiple instruments)	
2012	Dave Rawlings (multiple instruments)	Buddy Miller (guitar); Darrell Scott (multiple instruments); Chris Thile (mandolin)	
2011	Buddy Miller (guitar)	Sarah Jarosz (multiple instruments); Will Kimbrough (multiple instruments); Gurf Morlix (multiple instruments); Kenny Vaughan (guitar)	
2010	Buddy Miller (guitar)	Ryan Bingham (multiple instruments); Sarah Jarosz (multiple instruments); Corb Lund (guitar); Joe Pug (guitar)	
2009	Gurf Morlix (multiple instruments)	Sam Bush (multiple instruments); Jerry Douglas (dobro); Buddy Miller (guitar)	
2008	Buddy Miller (guitar)	Sam Bush (multiple instruments); Gurf Morlix (multiple instruments); Chris Thile (mandolin)	
2007	Buddy Miller (guitar)	Sam Bush (multiple instruments); Will Kimbrough (multiple instruments); Gurf Morlix (multiple instruments)	
2006	Kenny Vaughan (guitar)	Jerry Douglas (dobro); Tim O'Brien (multiple instruments); Bryan Sutton (multiple instruments)	
2005	Sonny Landreth (slide guitar)	Alison Brown (multiple instruments); Jerry Douglas (dobro); Gurf Morlix (multiple instruments)	
2004	Will Kimbrough (guitar)	Sam Bush (multiple instruments); Jerry Douglas (dobro); Kenny Vaughan (guitar)	
2003	Jerry Douglas (dobro)	Alison Krauss (fiddle); Buddy Miller (guitar); Gurf Morlix (multiple instruments)	
2002	Jerry Douglas (dobro)	Dave Rawlings (multiple instruments); Chris Thile (mandolin); Kenny Vaughan (guitar)	

=== Emerging Act of the Year ===
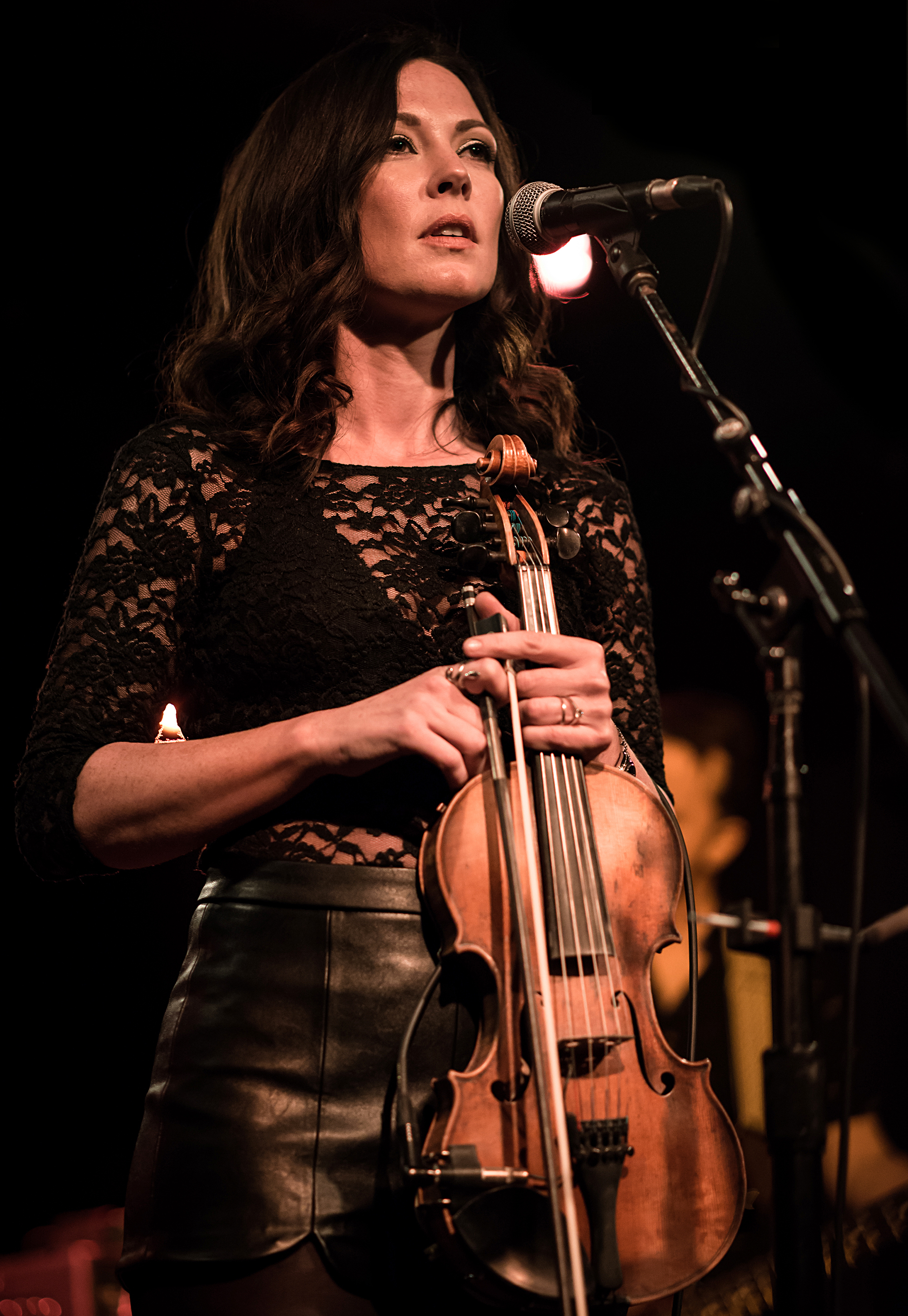
Amanda Shires had released five albums before her 2017 win

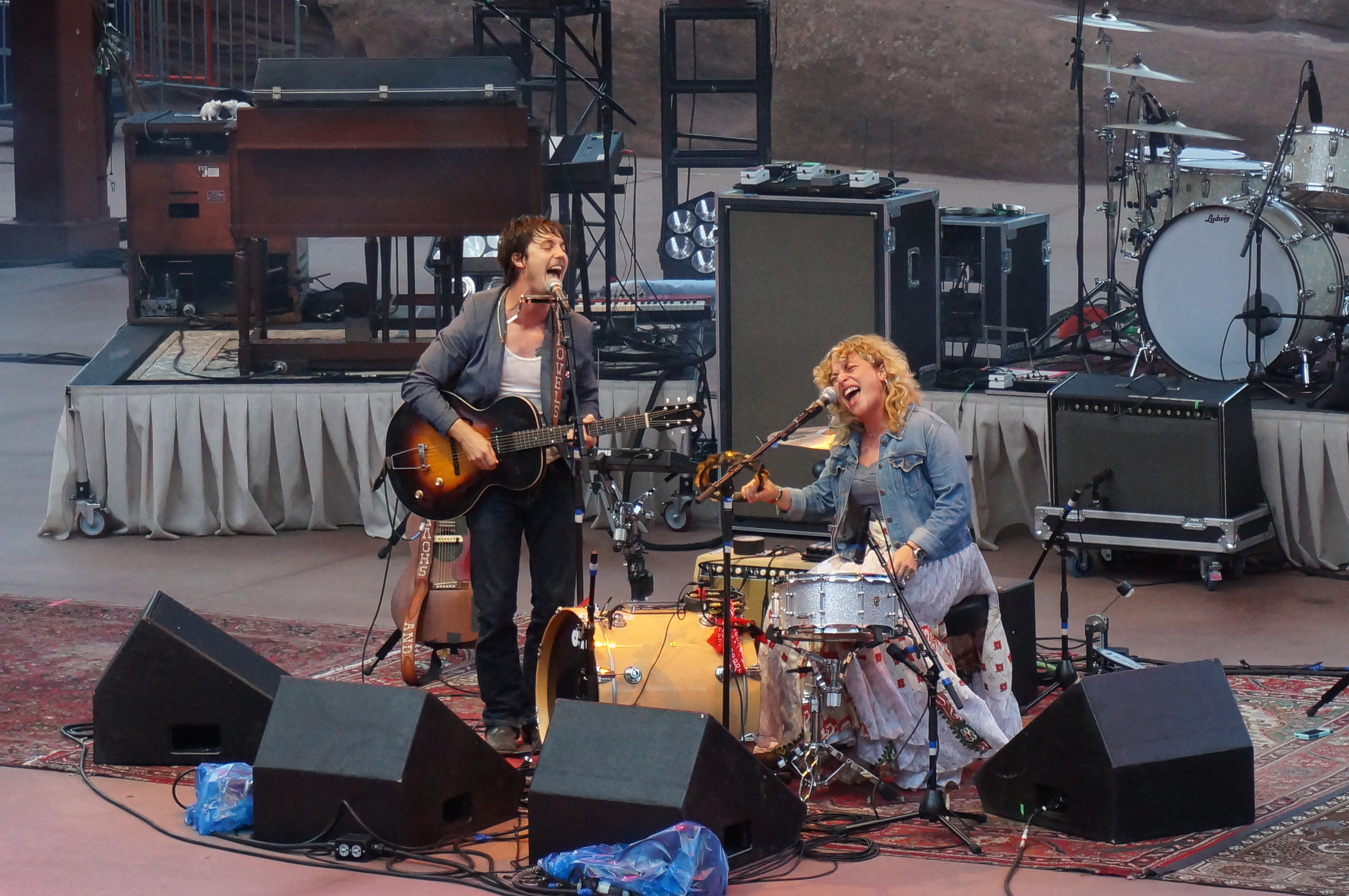
Shovels & Rope won in 2013

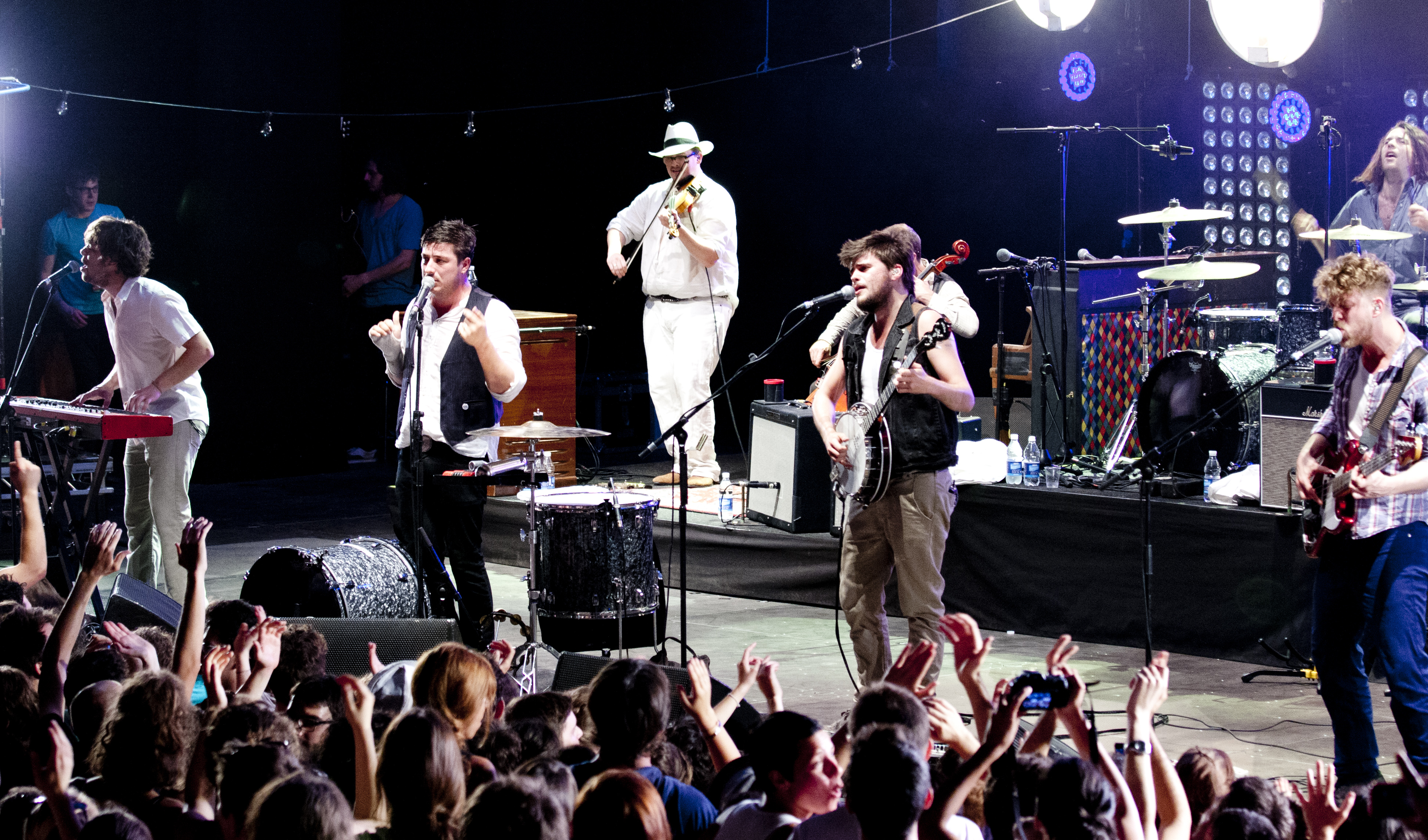
British band Mumford & Sons are the first non-Americans to win

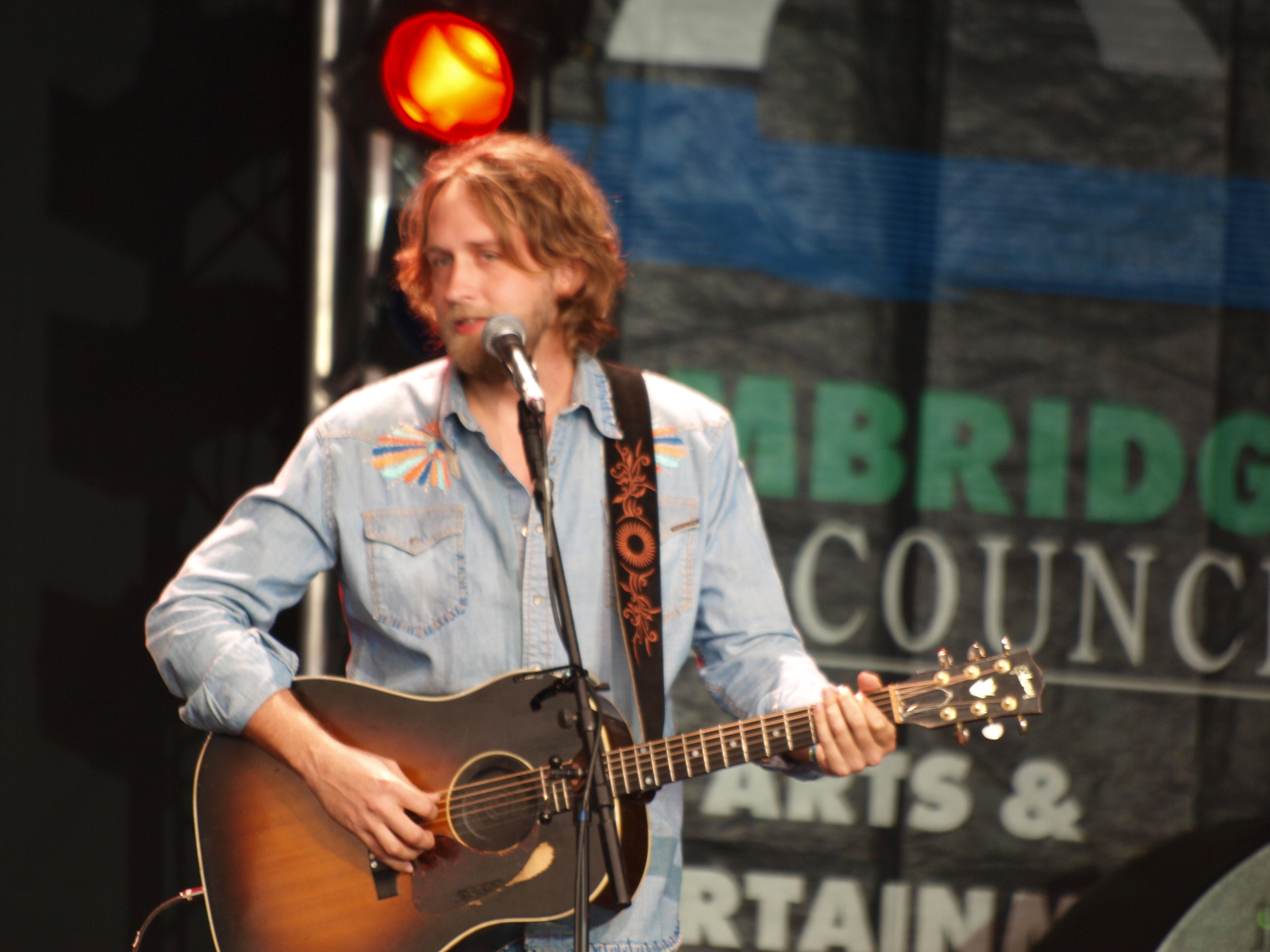
Hayes Carll received the award in 2010

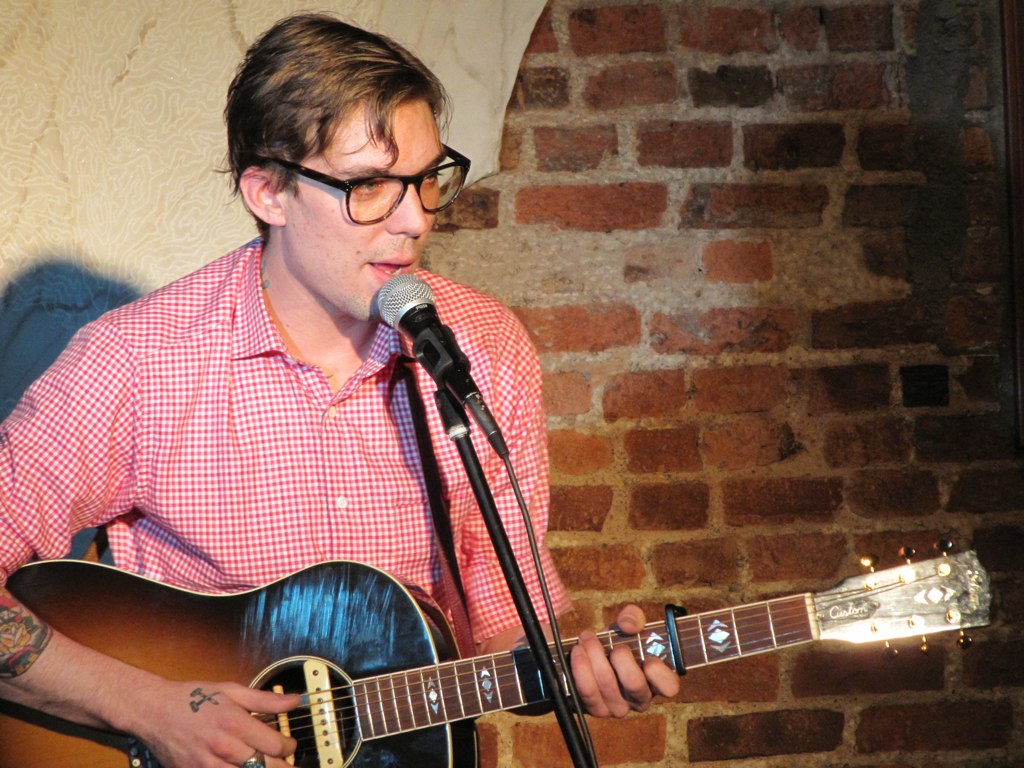
2009 recipient Justin Townes Earle

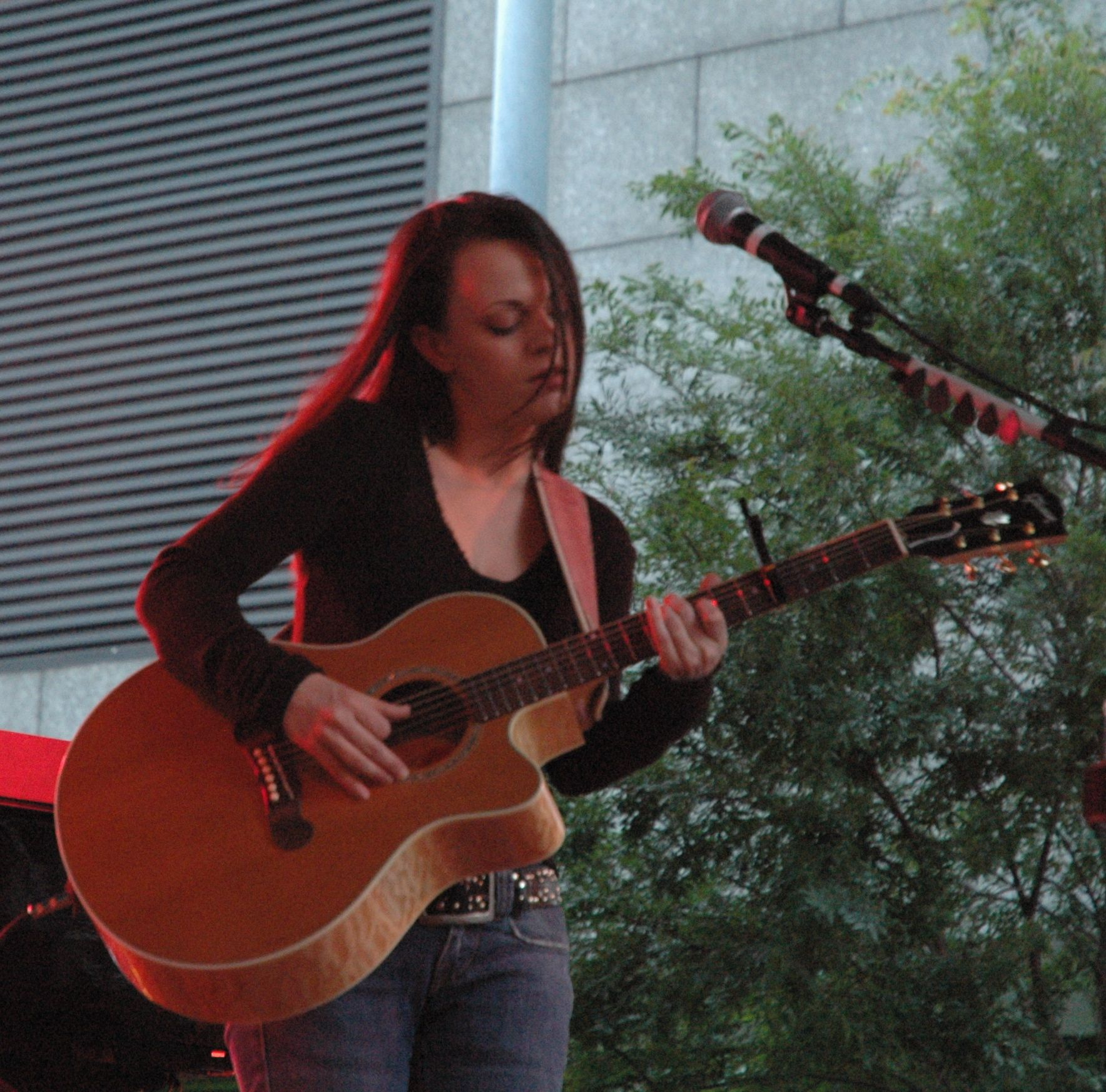
Inaugural winner Mindy Smith

Year	Recipient	Ref.
2023	S.G. Goodman	
2022	Sierra Ferrell	
2021	Charley Crockett	
2020	Black Pumas	
2019	The War and Treaty	
2018	Tyler Childers	
2017	Amanda Shires	
2016	Margo Price	
2015	Shakey Graves	
2014	Sturgill Simpson	
2013	Shovels & Rope	
2012	Alabama Shakes	
2011	Mumford & Sons	
2010	Hayes Carll	
2009	Justin Townes Earle	
2008	Mike Farris	
2007	The Avett Brothers	
2006	The Greencards	
2005	Mary Gauthier	
2004	Mindy Smith (first year)	

== Lifetime Achievement Awards ==
=== Americana Trailblazer Award ===
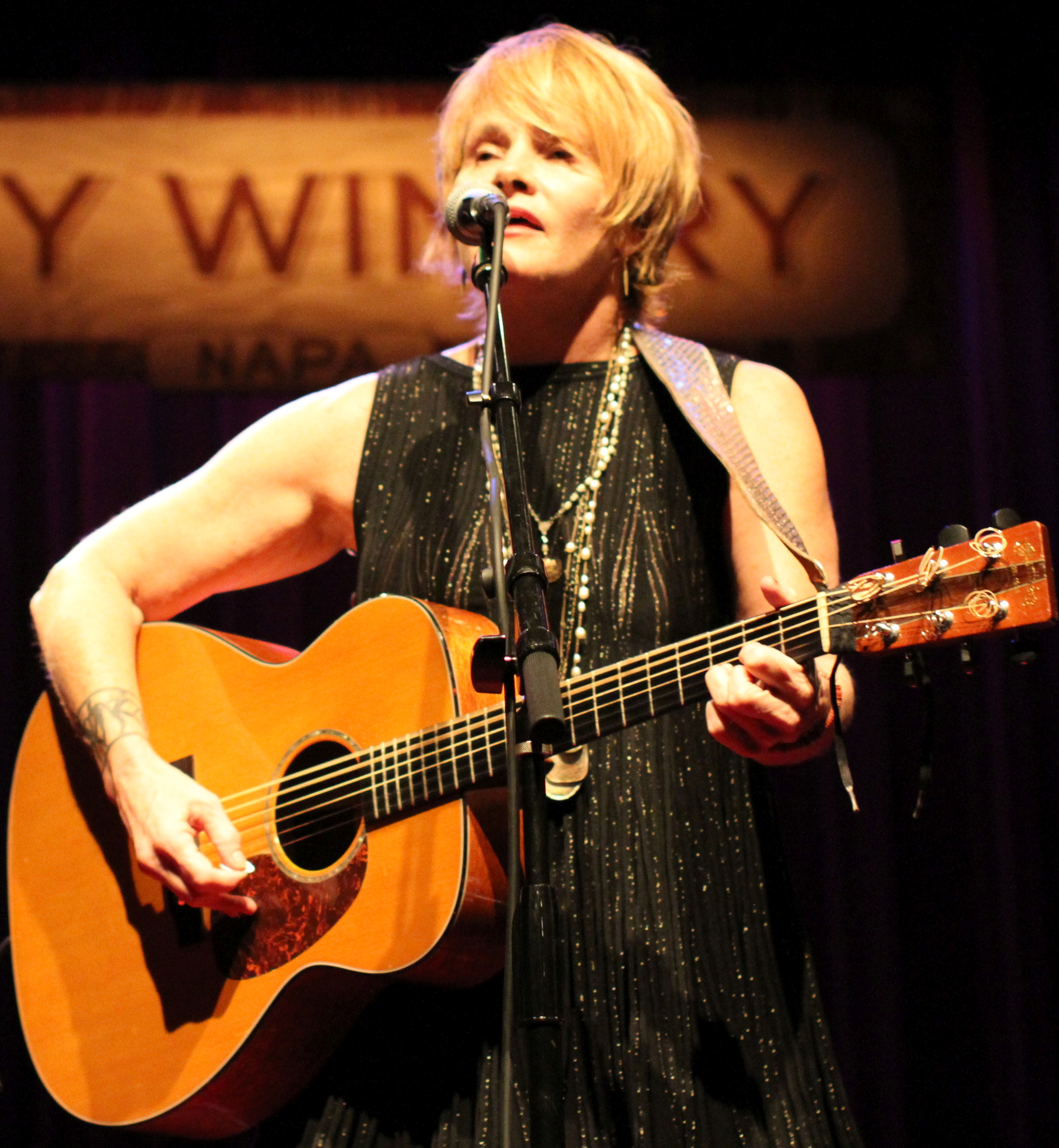
Shawn Colvin received the award in 2016

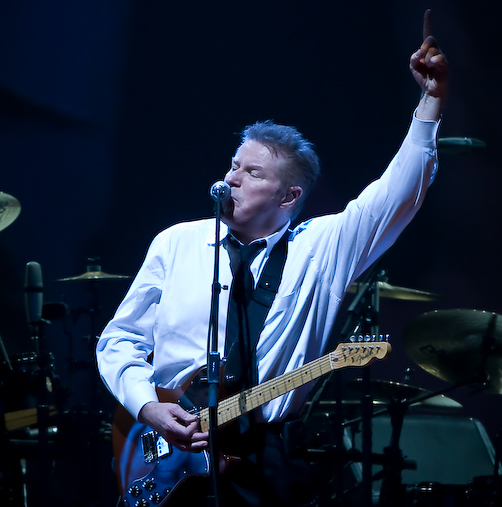
Don Henley, founding member of the Eagles, was honoured in 2015

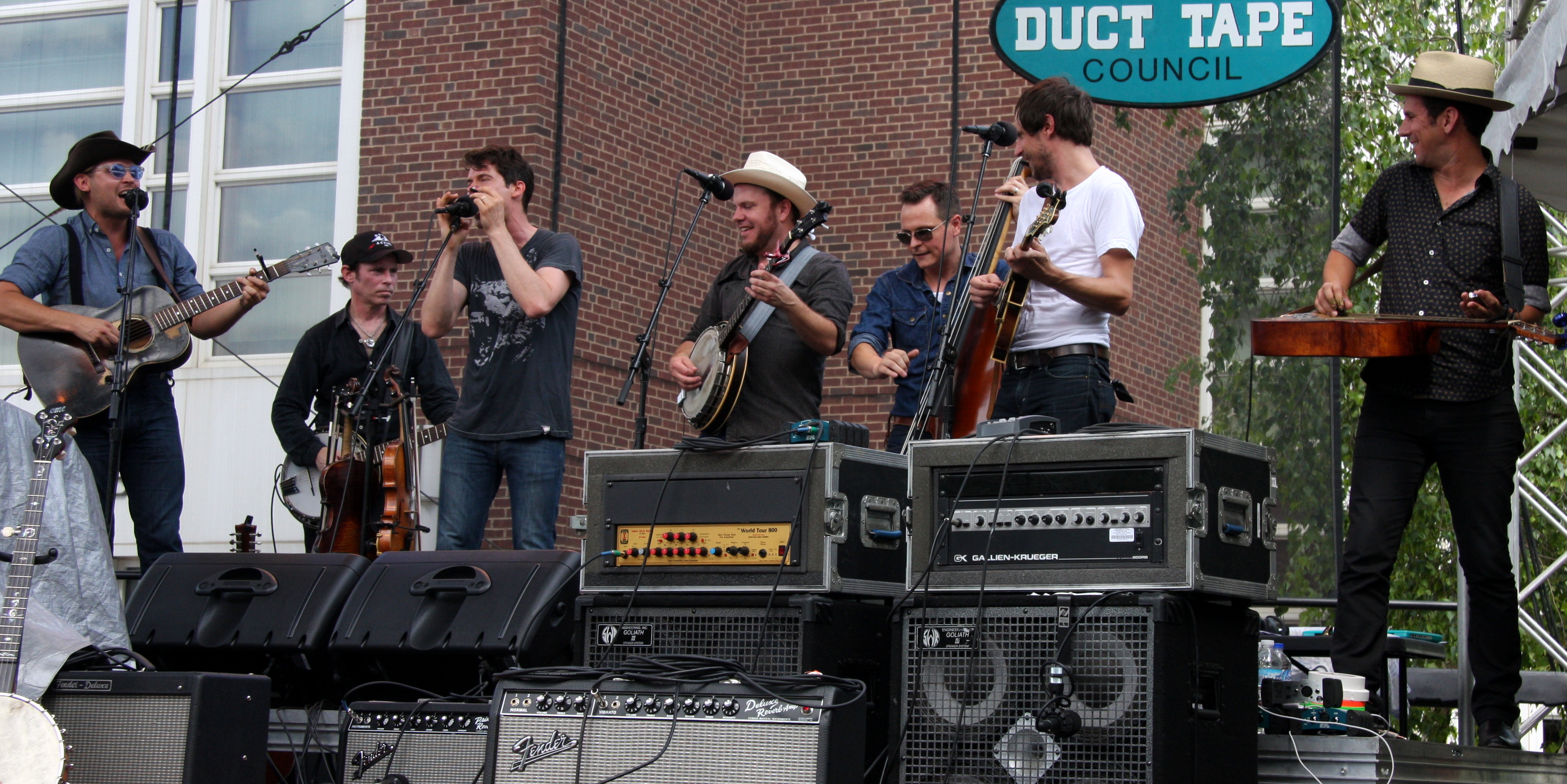
Old-time music band Old Crow Medicine Show were chosen in 2013

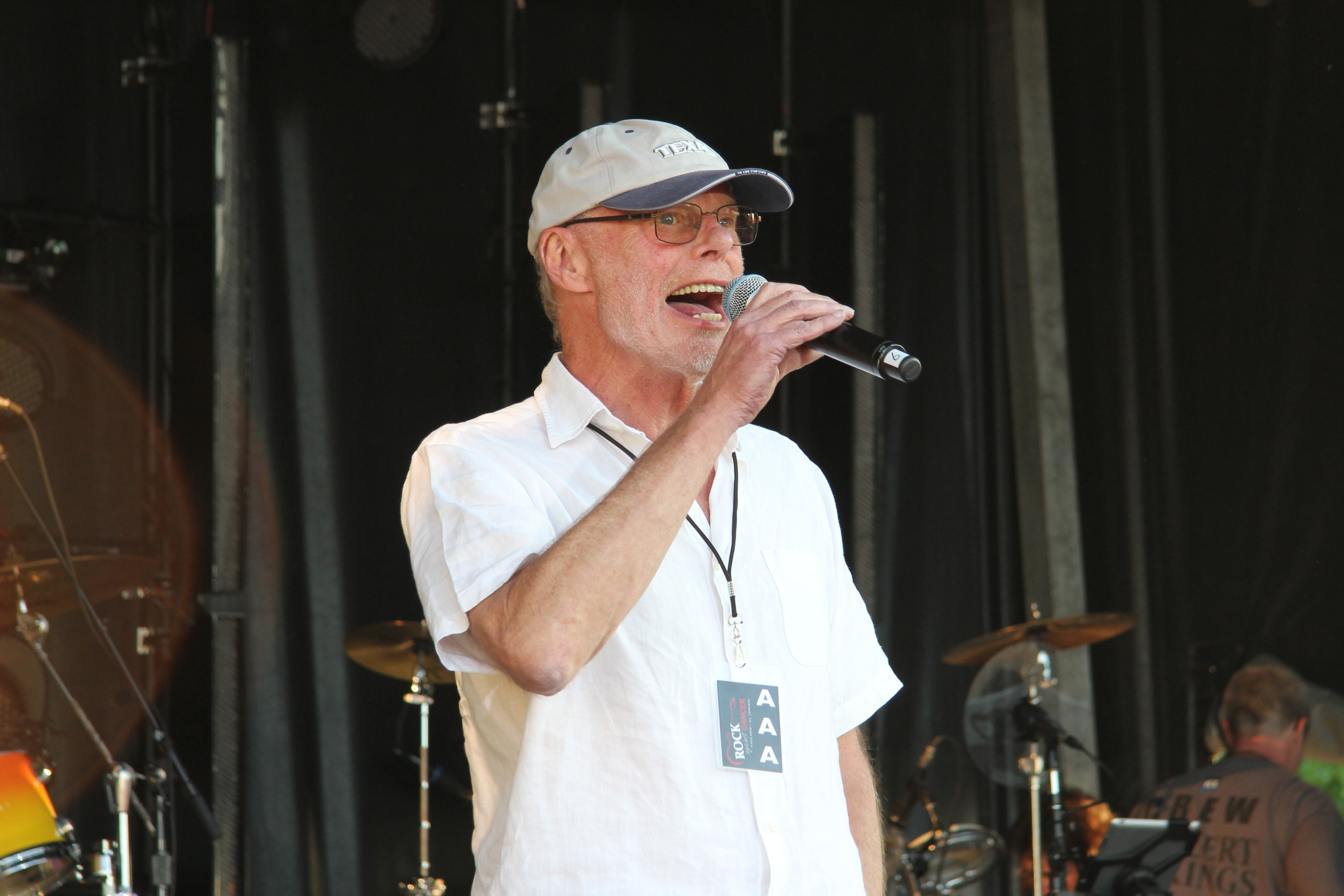
British radio host Bob Harris is the first non-performer to be honored

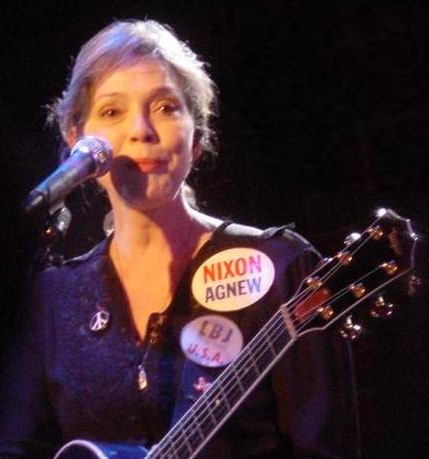
Folk singer Nanci Griffith was honoured in 2008

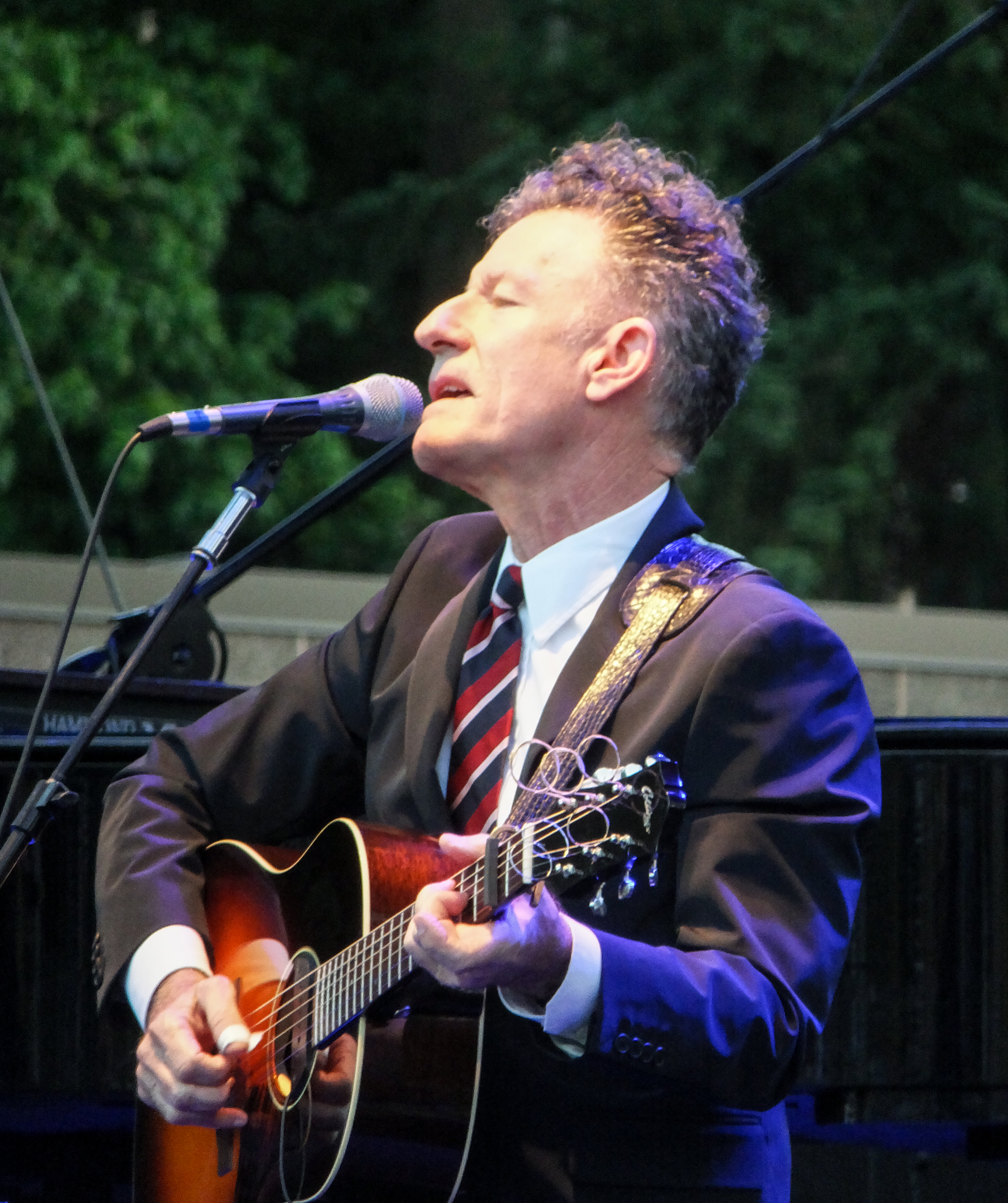
Lyle Lovett received the inaugural trailblazer award

Year	Recipient	Ref.
2021	The Mavericks	
2019	Maria Muldaur	
2018	K.d. lang	
2017	Iris DeMent	
2016	Shawn Colvin	
2015	Don Henley	
2013	Old Crow Medicine Show	
2011	Bob Harris	
2008	Nanci Griffith	
2007	Lyle Lovett (first year)	

=== First Amendment Center and Americana Music Association "Spirit of Americana" Free Speech Award/Inspiration Award ===
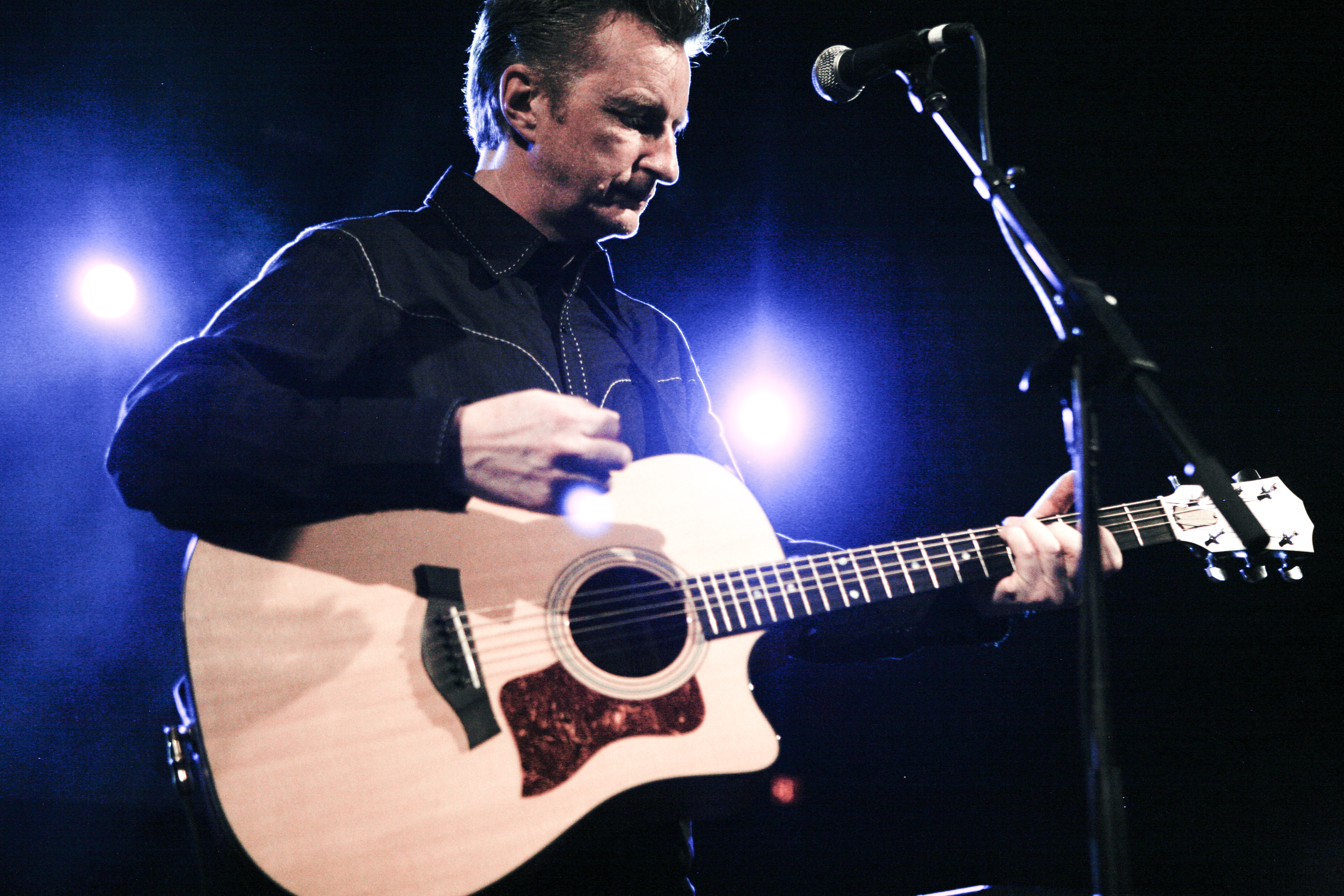
British folk singer Billy Bragg was the first European recipient

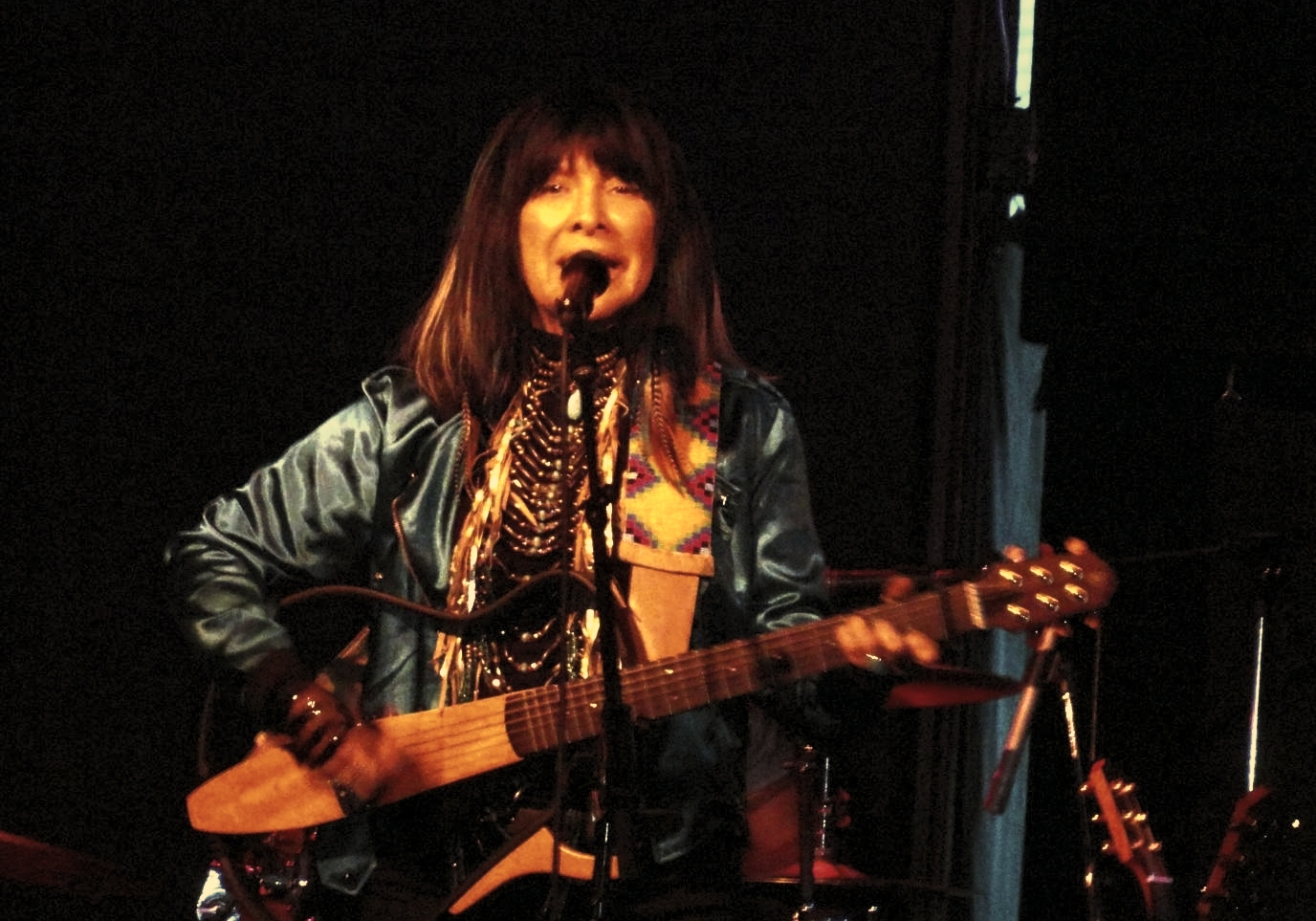
2015 honoree Buffy Sainte-Marie was the first non-American winner

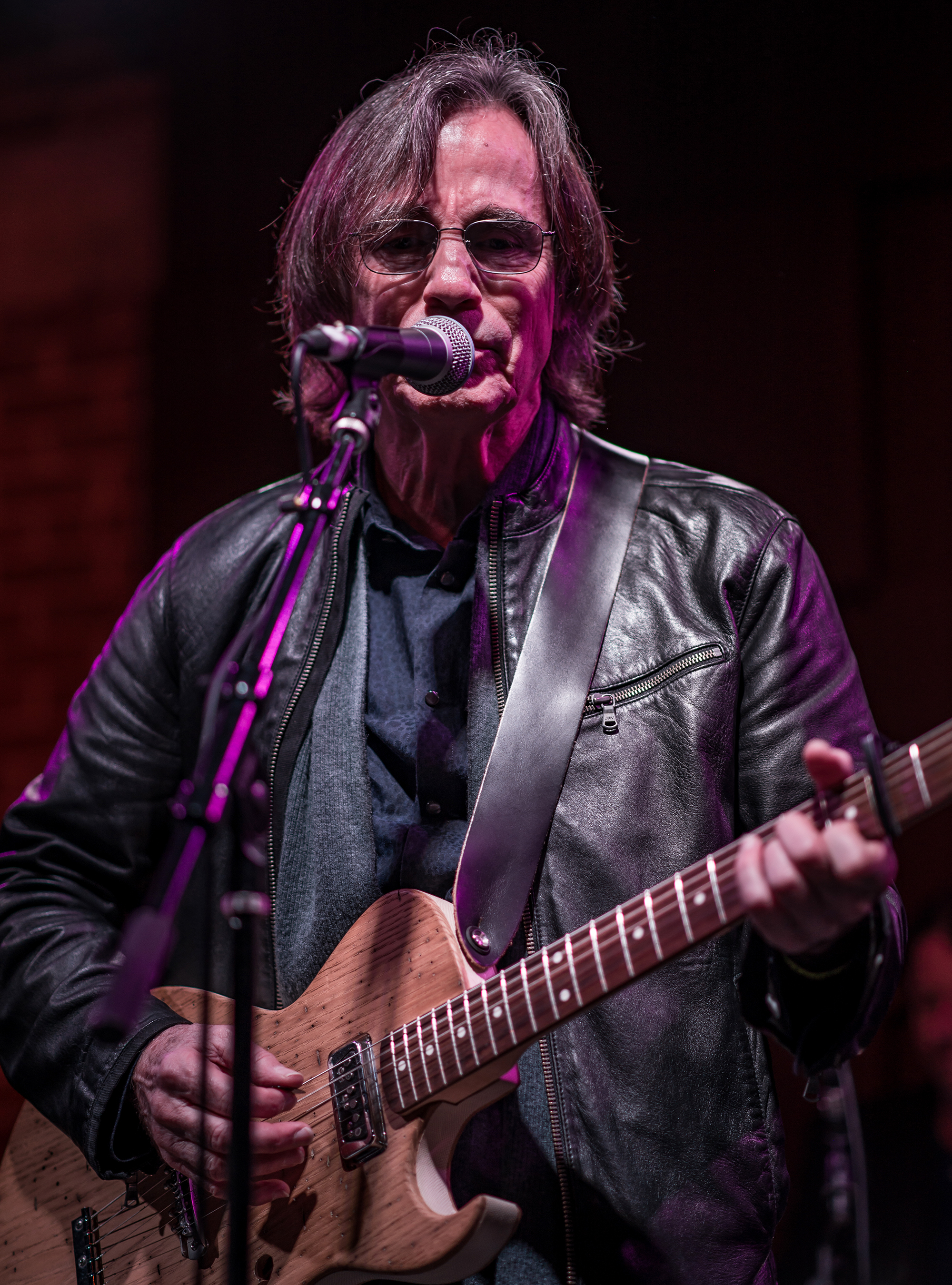
Jackson Browne received the award in 2014

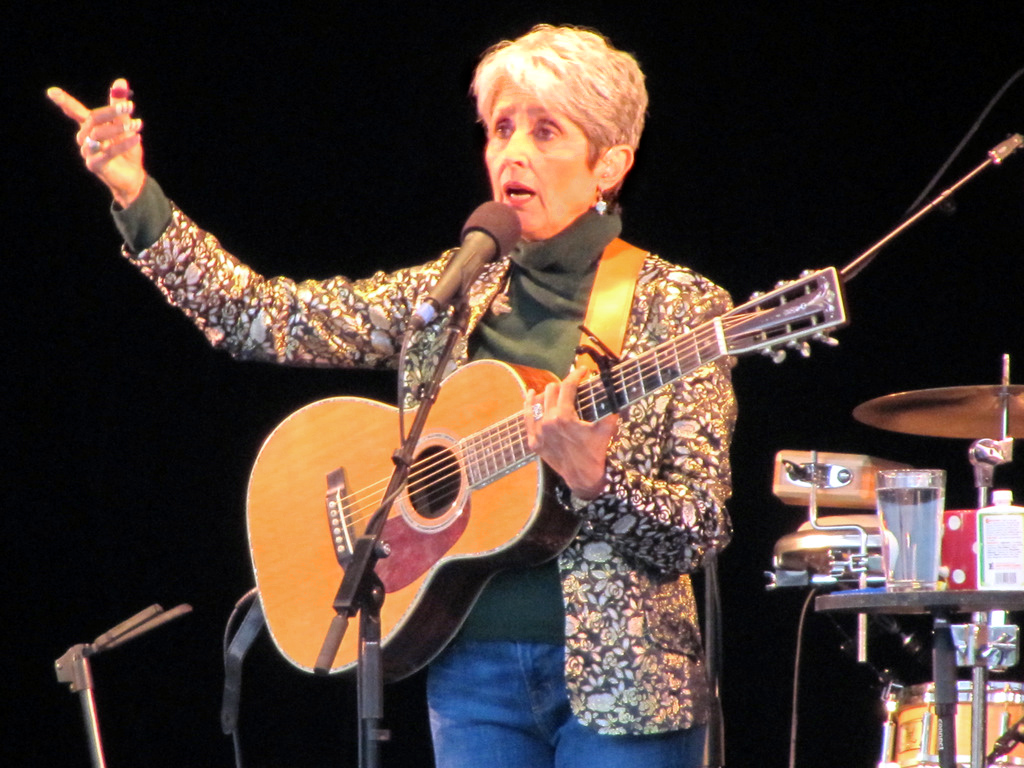
Renowned activist and folk singer Joan Baez won in 2008

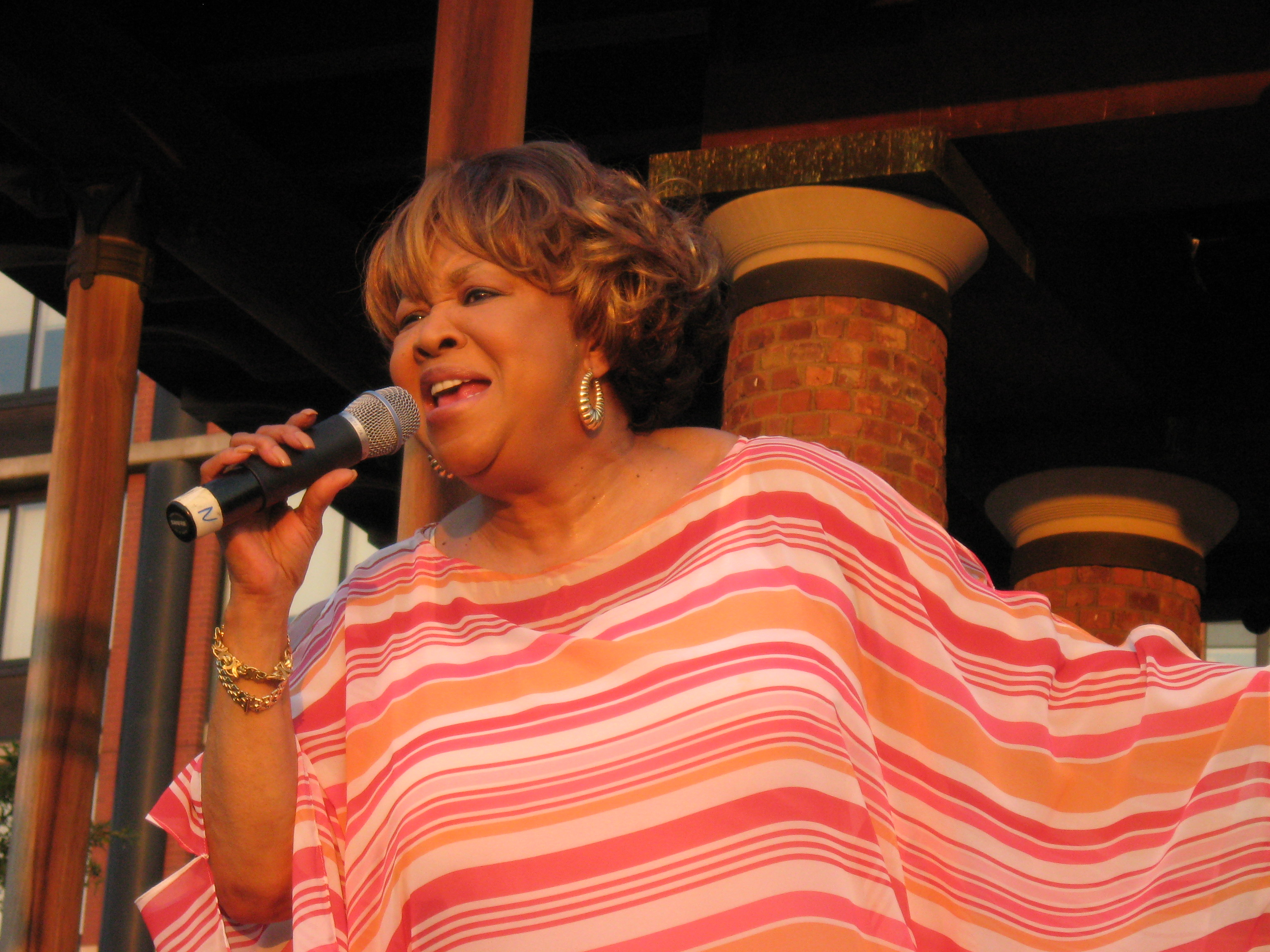
Mavis Staples was honoured in 2007 and collected her award in 2019

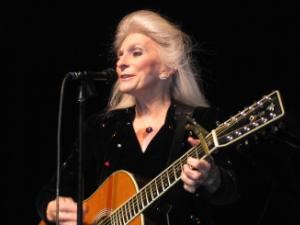
Activist folk singer Judy Collins received the award in 2005

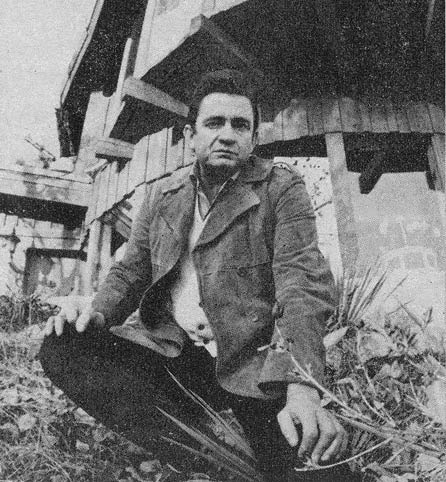
Inaugural Free Speech winner Johnny Cash

Year	Recipient	Ref.
2022	Indigo Girls	
2021	Carla Thomas	
2019	Mavis Staples	
2018	Rosanne Cash	
2017	Graham Nash	
2016	Billy Bragg	
2015	Buffy Sainte-Marie	
2014	Jackson Browne	
2013	Stephen Stills	
2010	Mary Chapin Carpenter	
2008	Joan Baez	
2007	Mavis Staples	
2006	Charlie Daniels	
2005	Judy Collins	
2004	Steve Earle	
2003	Kris Kristofferson	
2002	Johnny Cash	

=== Jack Emerson Lifetime Achievement Award for Executive ===
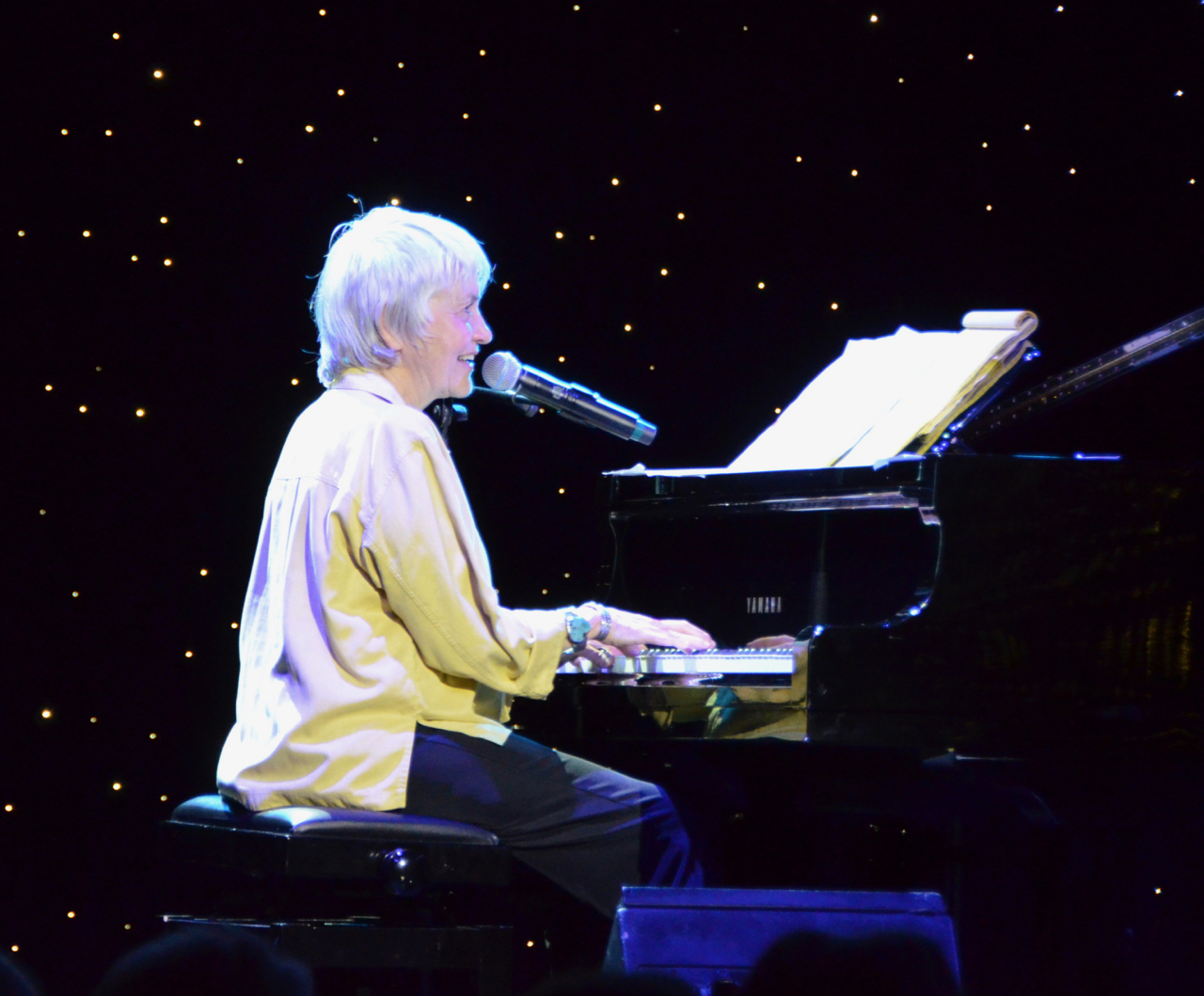
Cris Williamson received the award in 2018

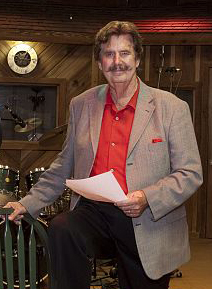
Rick Hall was honoured in 2011

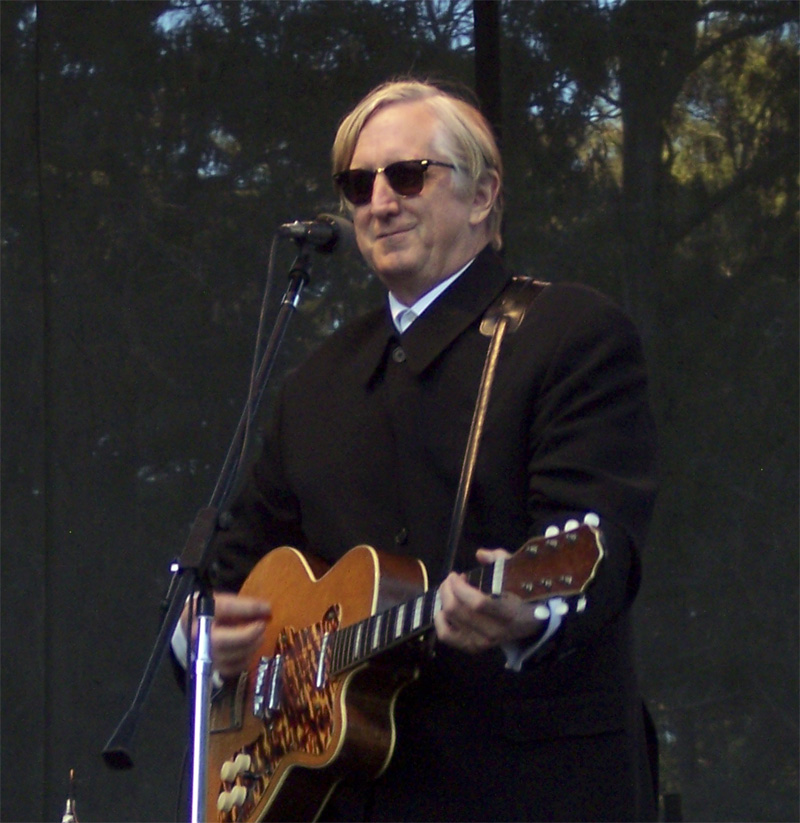
Renowned producer T-Bone Burnett was the inaugural recipient

Year	Recipient	Ref.
2022	Al Bell	
2018	The Olivia Records Founders: Judy Dlugacz and Cris Williamson	
2017	The HighTone Founders: Larry Sloven and Bruce Bromberg	
2013	Chris Strachwitz	
2012	Dennis Lord	
2011	Rick Hall	
2010	Luke Lewis	
2009	Ken Levitan	
2008	Terry Lickona	
2007	Mary Martin	
2006	Barry Poss	
2005	The Rounder Founders: Ken Irwin, Marian Leighton, Bill Nowlin	
2004	Jack Emerson	
2003	Sam Phillips	
2002	T-Bone Burnett	

=== Lifetime Achievement Award for Instrumentalist ===
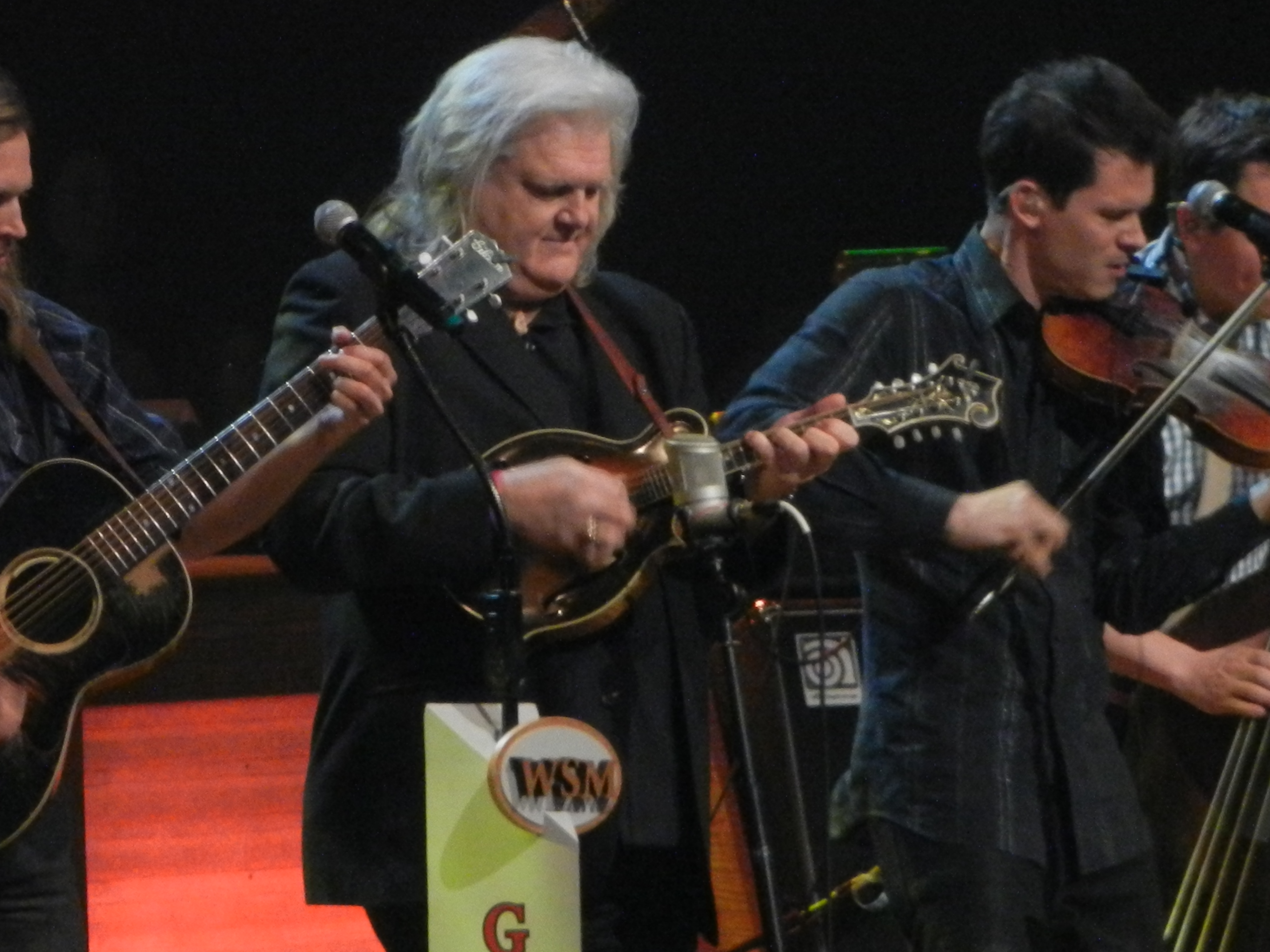
Ricky Skaggs received the honor in 2015

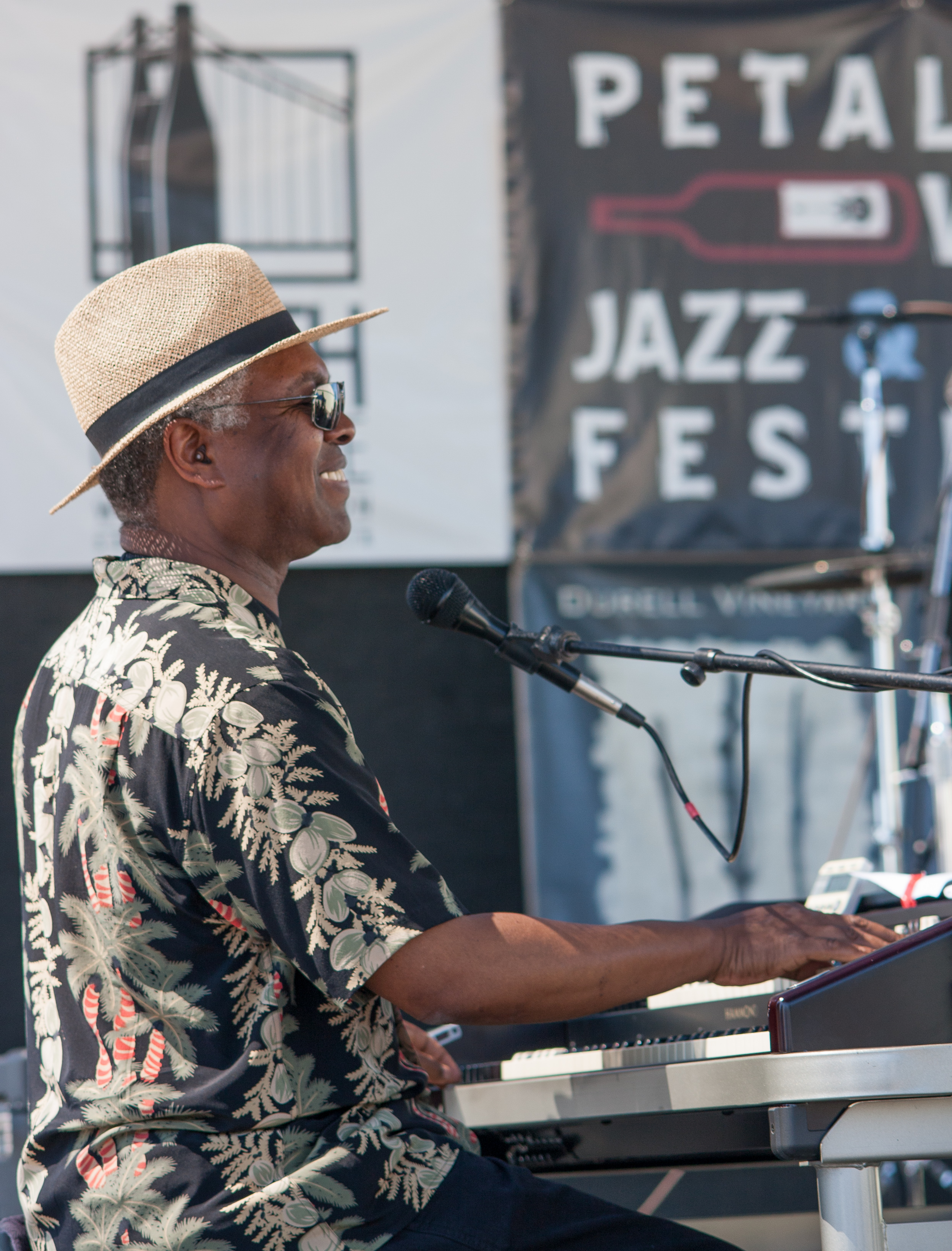
R&B pianist Booker T. Jones was given the award in 2012

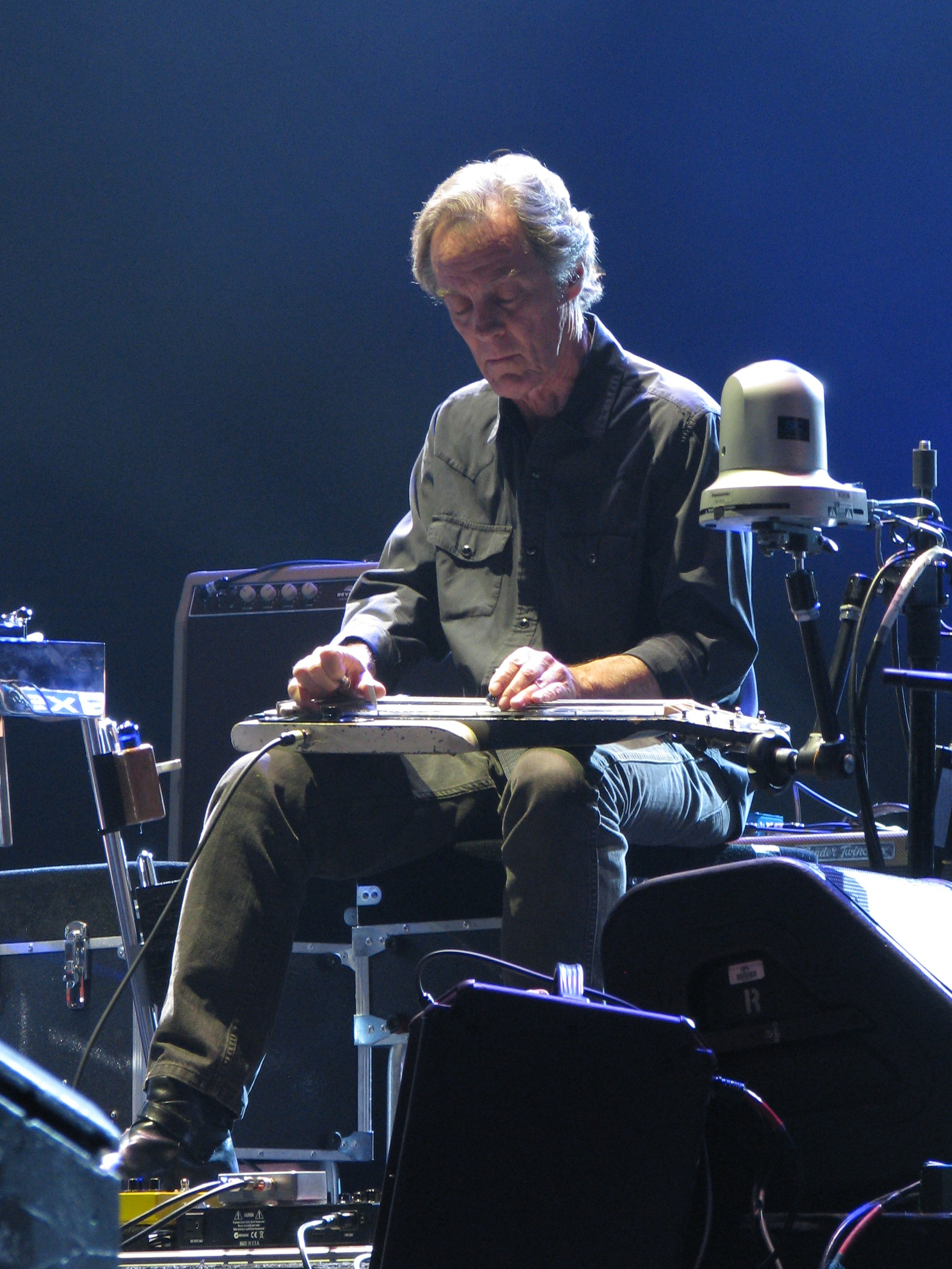
2010 recipient Greg Leisz has played with hundreds of Americana artists

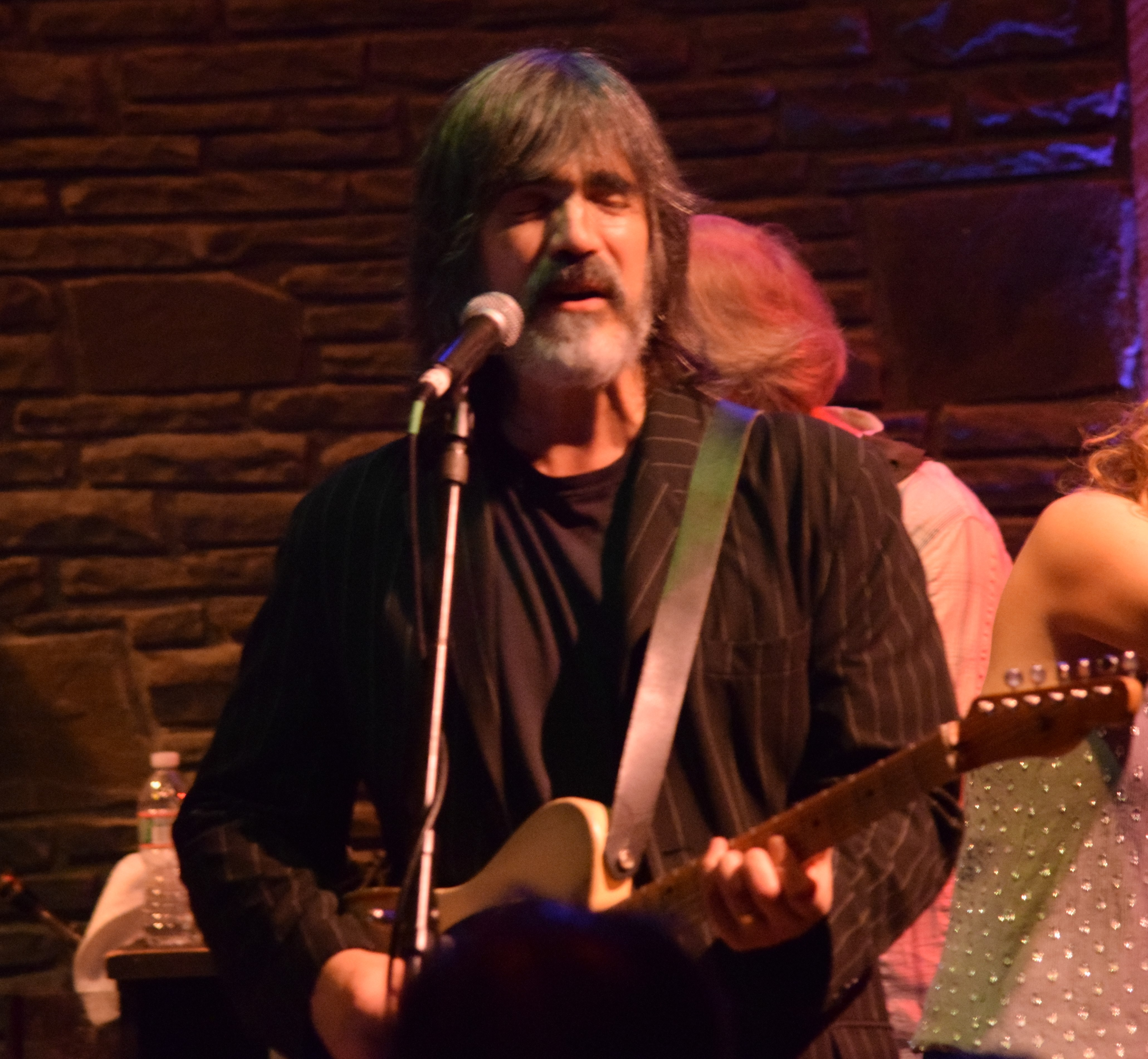
Larry Campbell plays guitar, mandolin, bass, violin and bouzouki

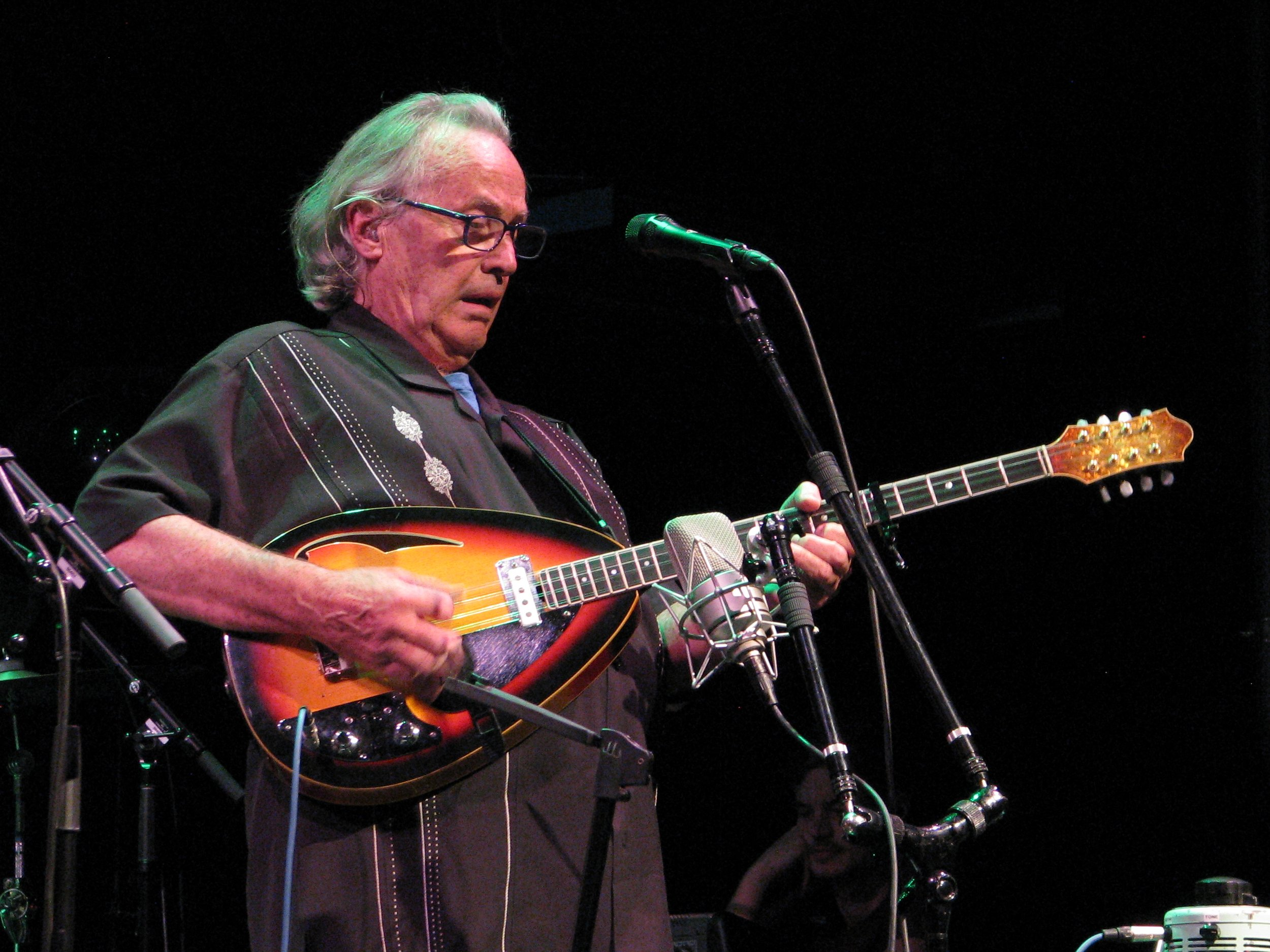
Guitarist Ry Cooder was honoured in 2007

Year	Recipient	Ref.
2018	Buddy Guy (guitar)	
2017	Hi Rhythm (band)	
2015	Ricky Skaggs (mandolin)	
2014	Flaco Jimenez (accordion)	
2013	Duane Eddy (guitar)	
2012	Booker T. Jones (piano)	
2011	Jerry Douglas (dobro)	
2010	Greg Leisz (multiple instruments)	
2009	Sam Bush (mandolin)	
2008	Larry Campbell (multiple string instruments)	
2007	Ry Cooder (slide guitar)	
2006	Kenny Vaughan (guitar)	

=== Lifetime Achievement Award for Performance ===
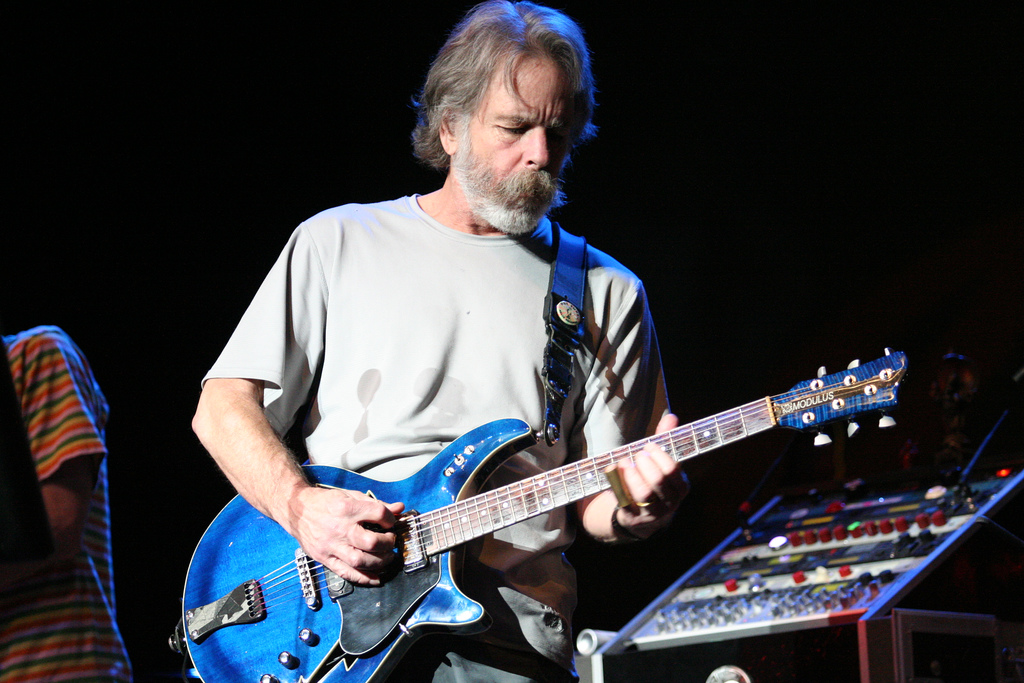
Bob Weir received the Performance Award in 2016

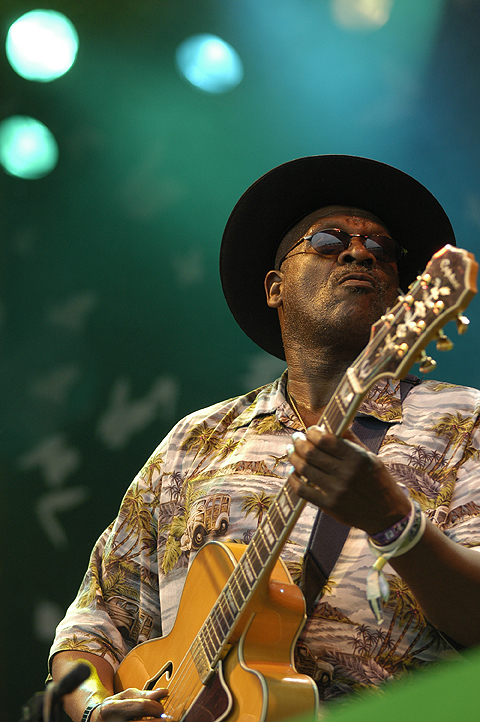
2014 winner Taj Mahal

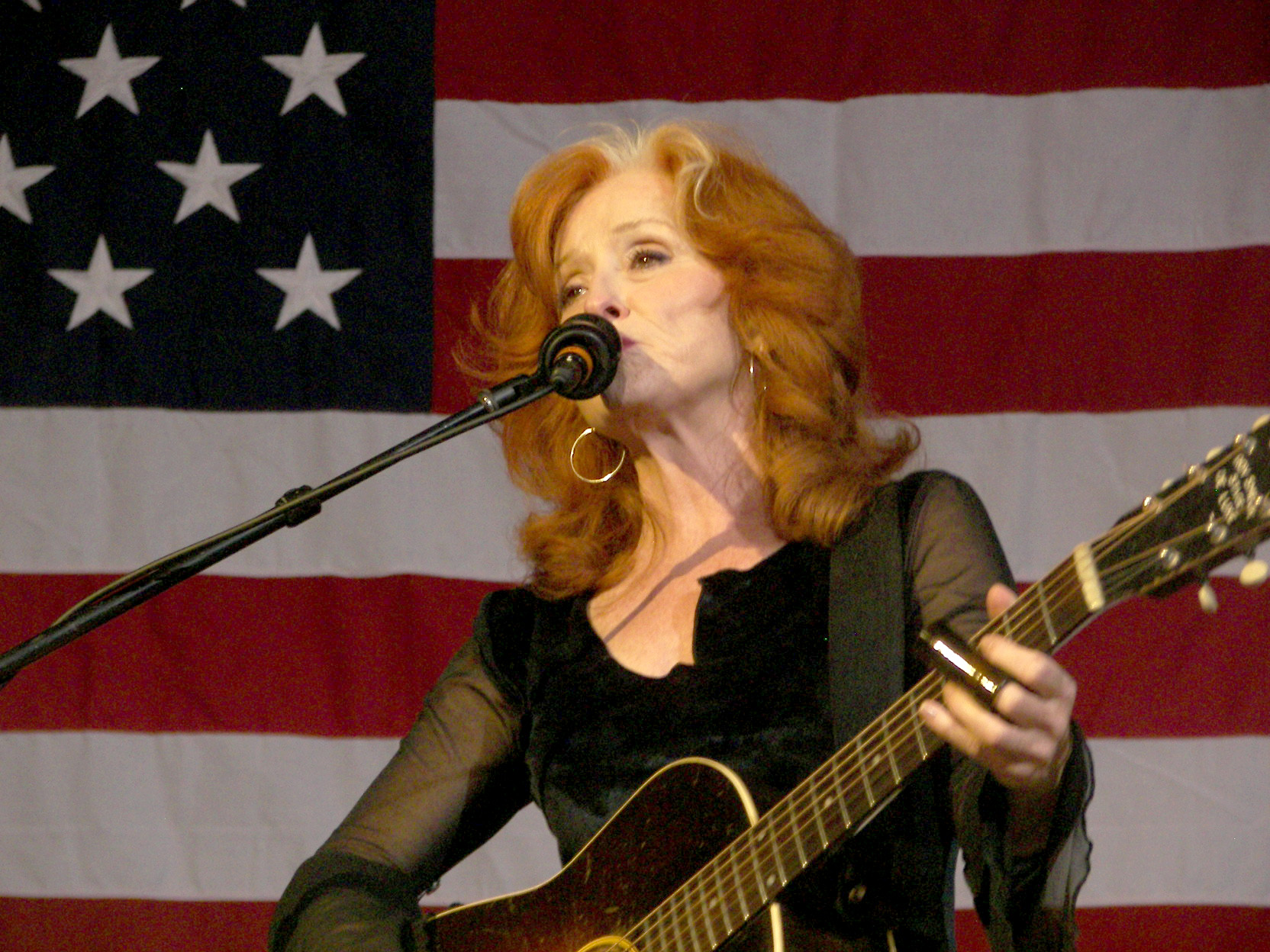
2012 recipient Bonnie Raitt

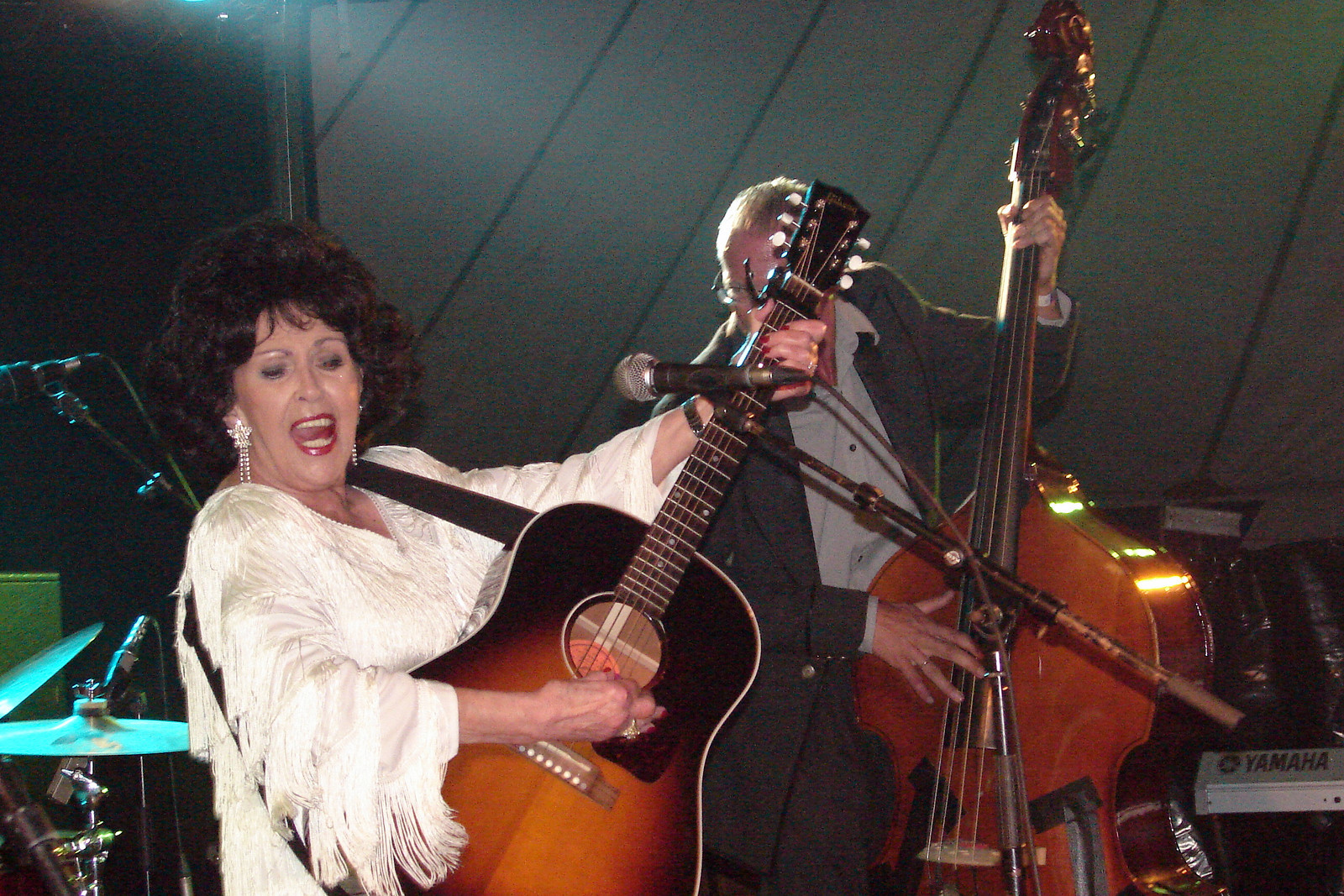
Rockabilly queen Wanda Jackson was honoured in 2010

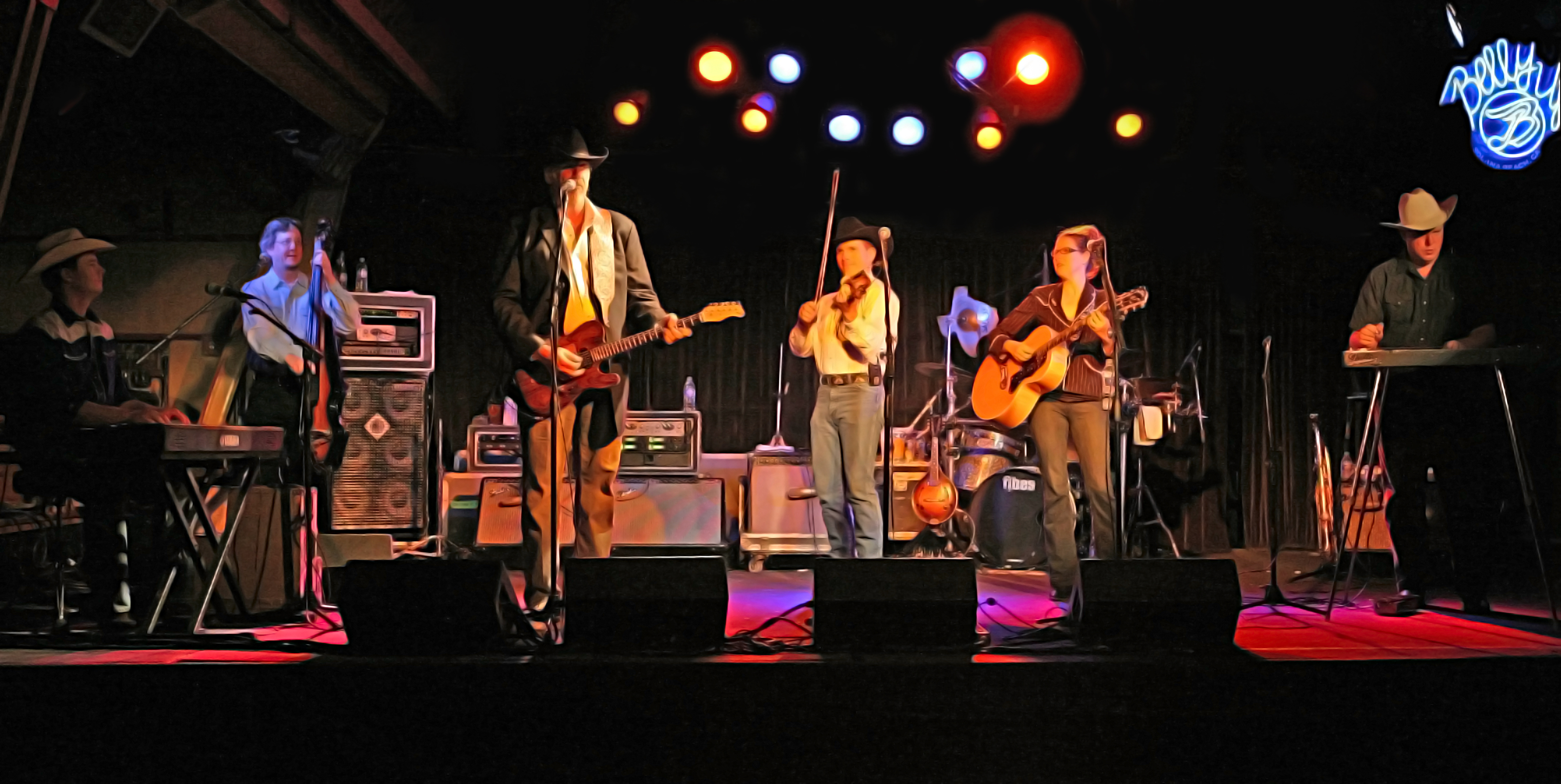
Western swing band Asleep at the Wheel won in 2009

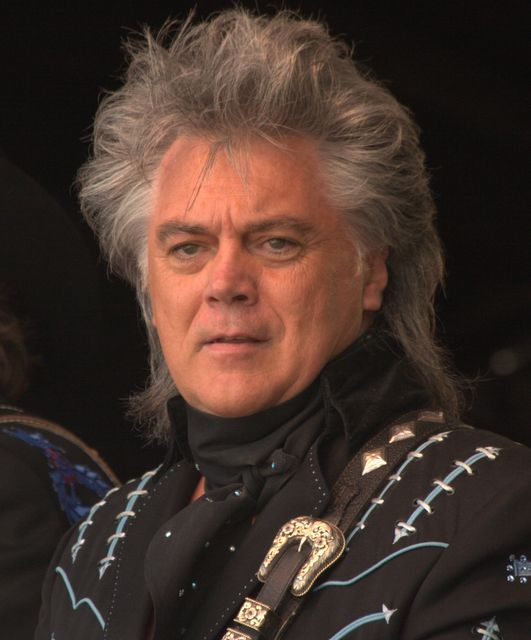
2005 honoree Marty Stuart

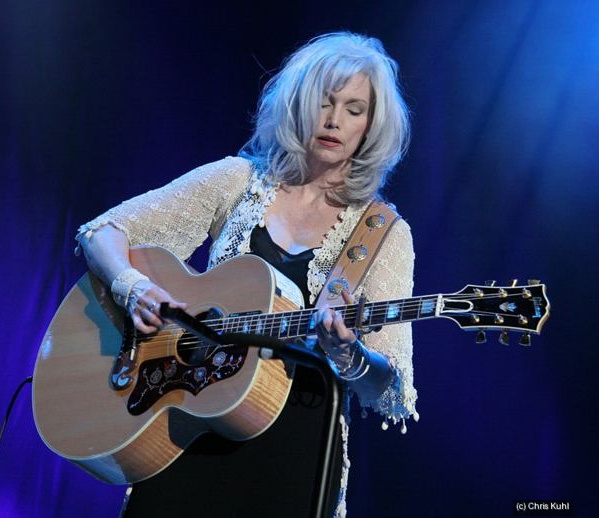
Inaugural winner, folk/country singer Emmylou Harris

Year	Recipient	Ref.
2022	Chris Isaak	
2021	Keb' Mo'	
2019	Delbert McClinton	
2018	Irma Thomas	
2017	Robert Cray	
2016	Bob Weir	
2015	Los Lobos	
2014	Taj Mahal	
2013	Dr. John	
2012	Bonnie Raitt	
2011	Gregg Allman	
2010	Wanda Jackson	
2009	Asleep at the Wheel	
2008	Jason & the Scorchers	
2007	Joe Ely	
2006	Alejandro Escovedo	
2005	Marty Stuart	
2004	Chris Hillman	
2003	Levon Helm	
2002	Emmylou Harris	

=== Lifetime Achievement Award for Producer/Engineer ===
Year	Recipient	Ref.
2021	Trina Shoemaker	
2010	Brian Ahern	
2009	Jim Rooney	
2008	Tony Brown	
2007	Jim Dickinson	
2006	Allen Toussaint (first year)	

=== Lifetime Achievement Award for Songwriting ===
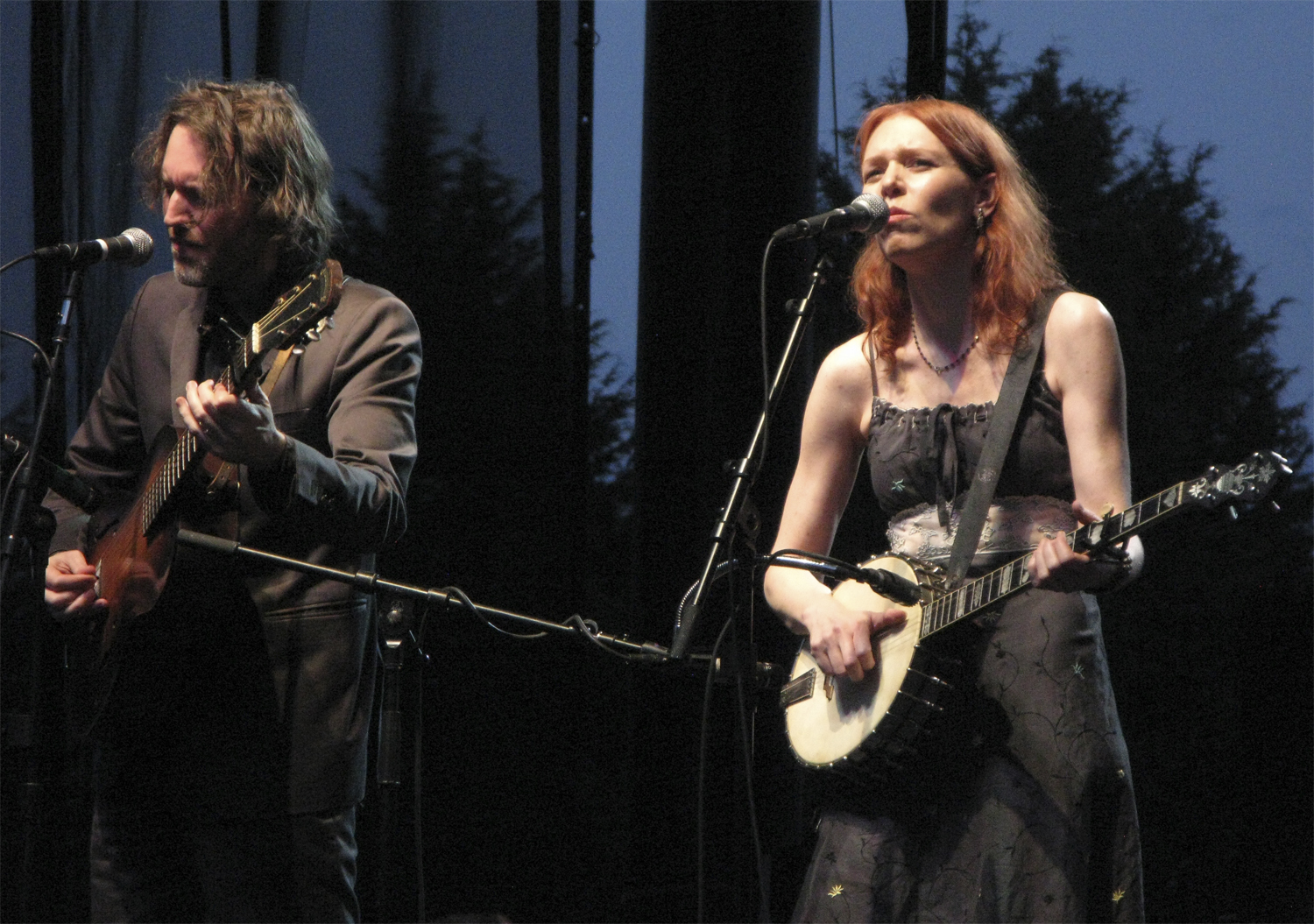
2015 recipients Gillian Welch and David Rawlings

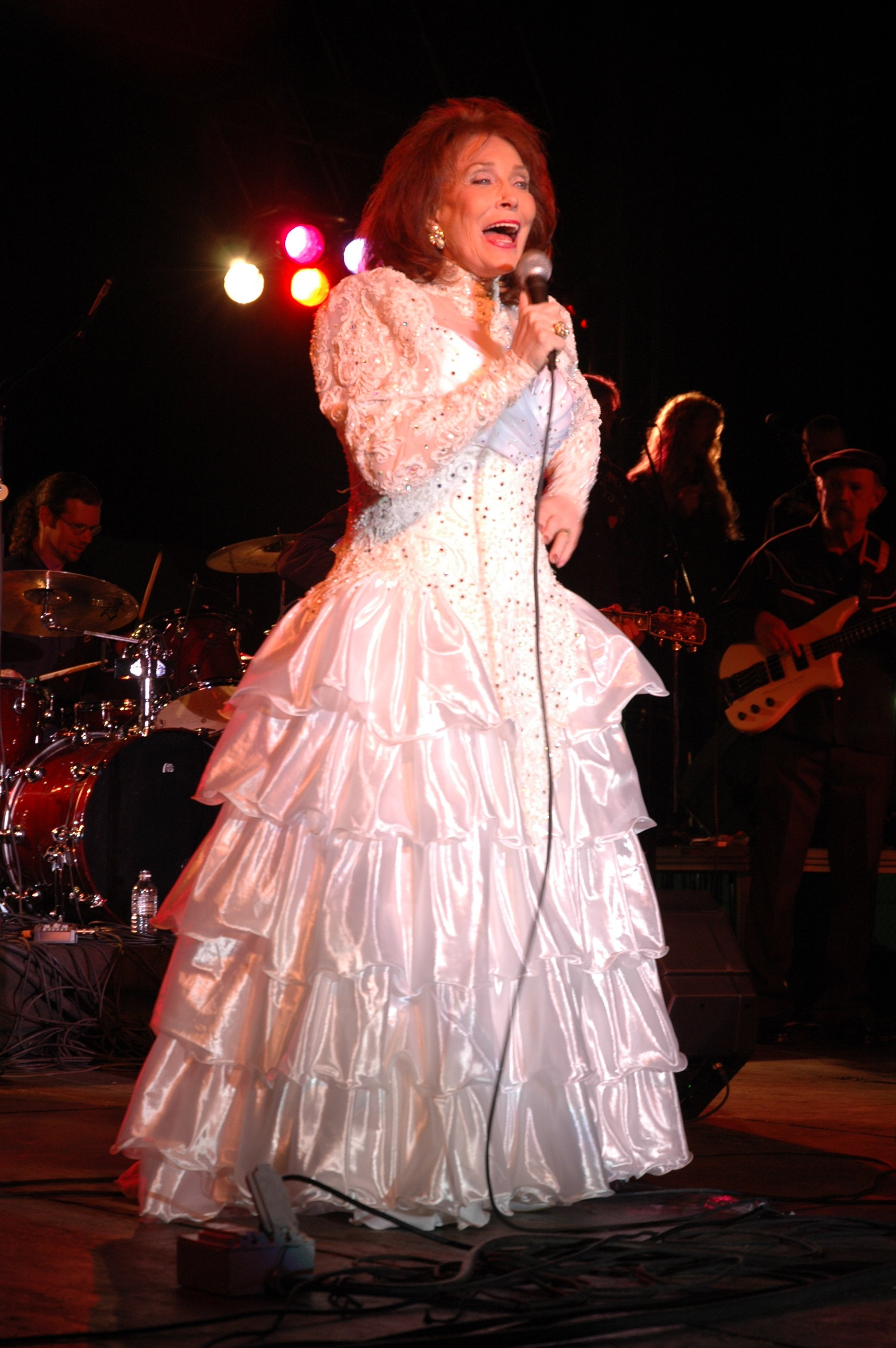
2014 honoree Loretta Lynn

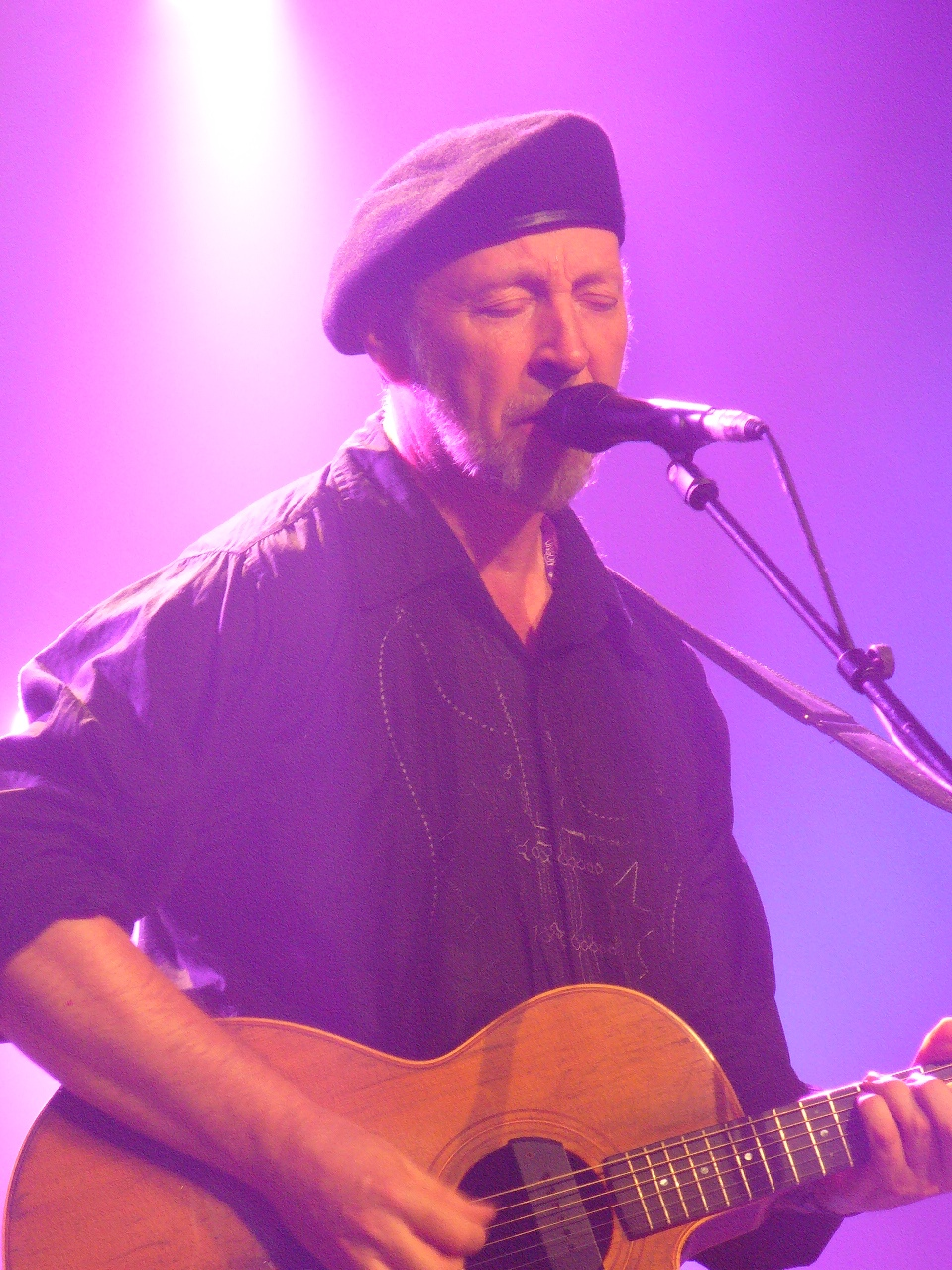
Richard Thompson is the first non-American winner

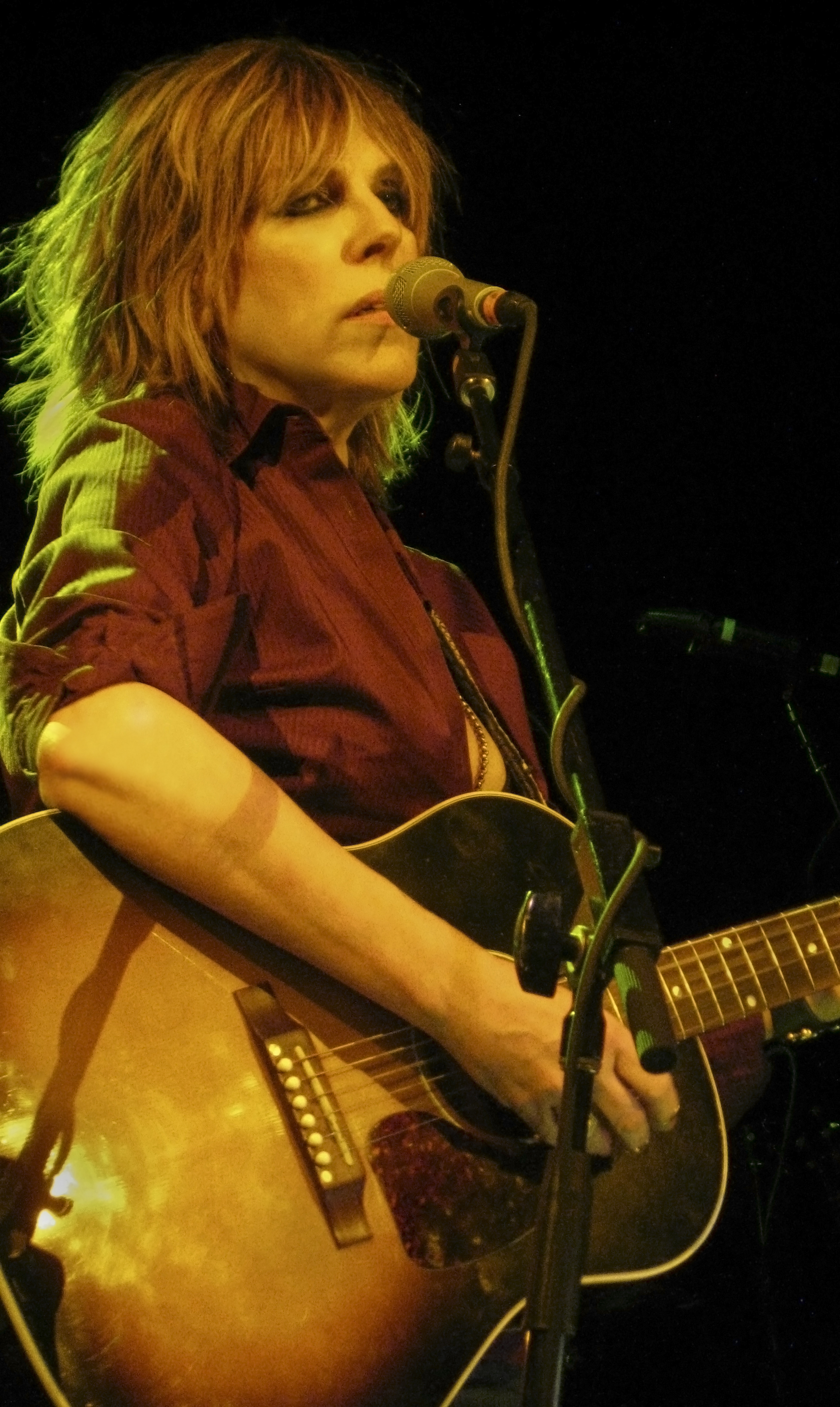
Lucinda Williams is the first female recipient

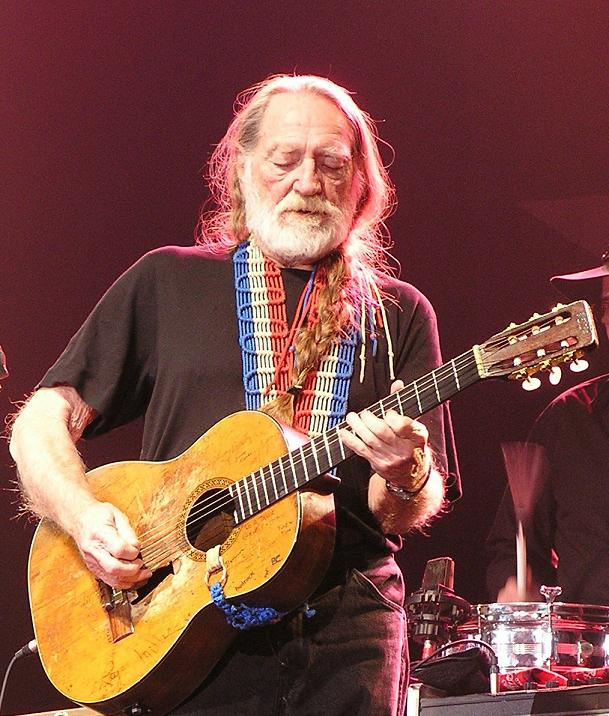
Prolific country singer Willie Nelson was honoured in 2007

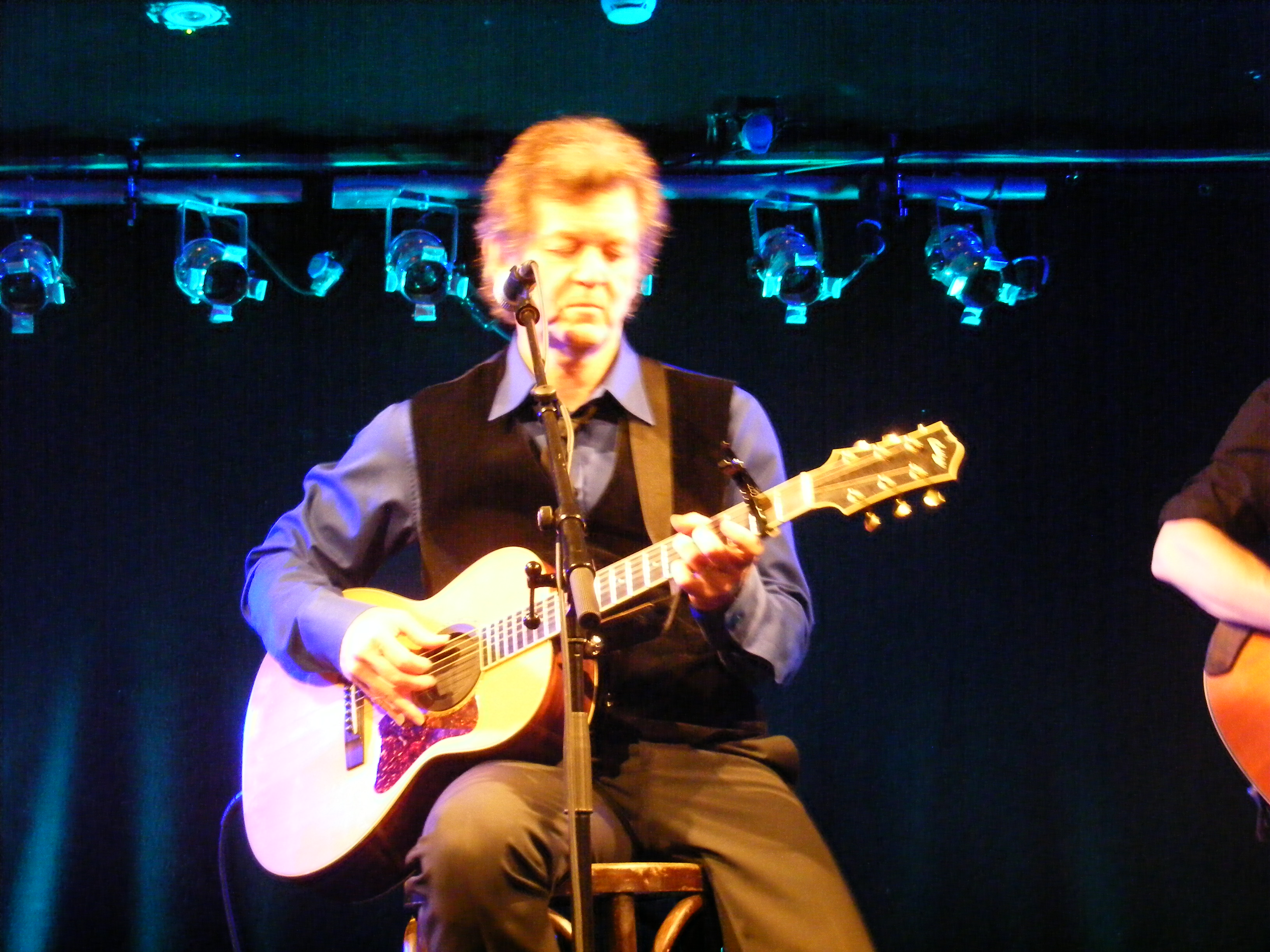
2006 recipient Rodney Crowell

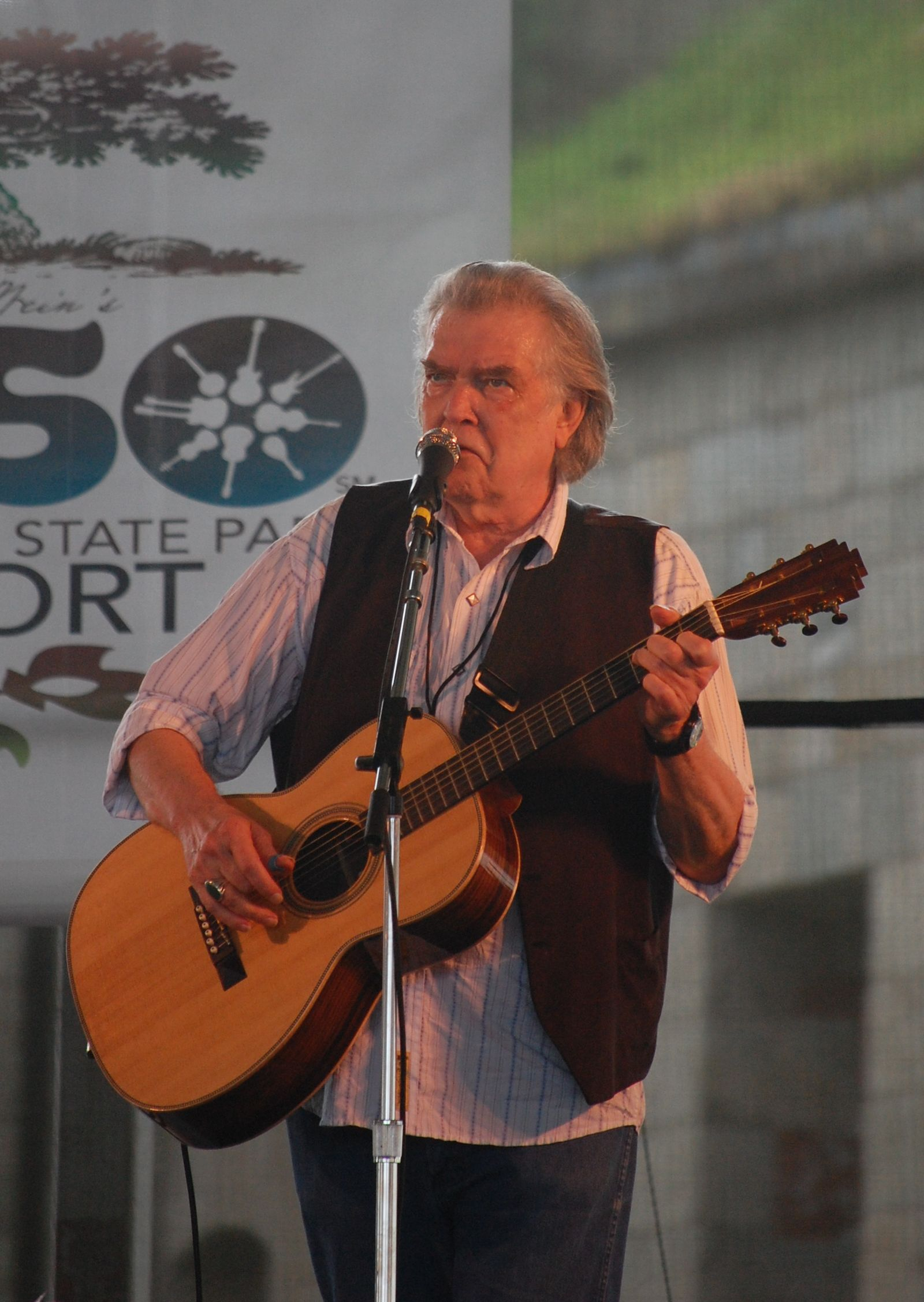
Guy Clark received the Award in 2005

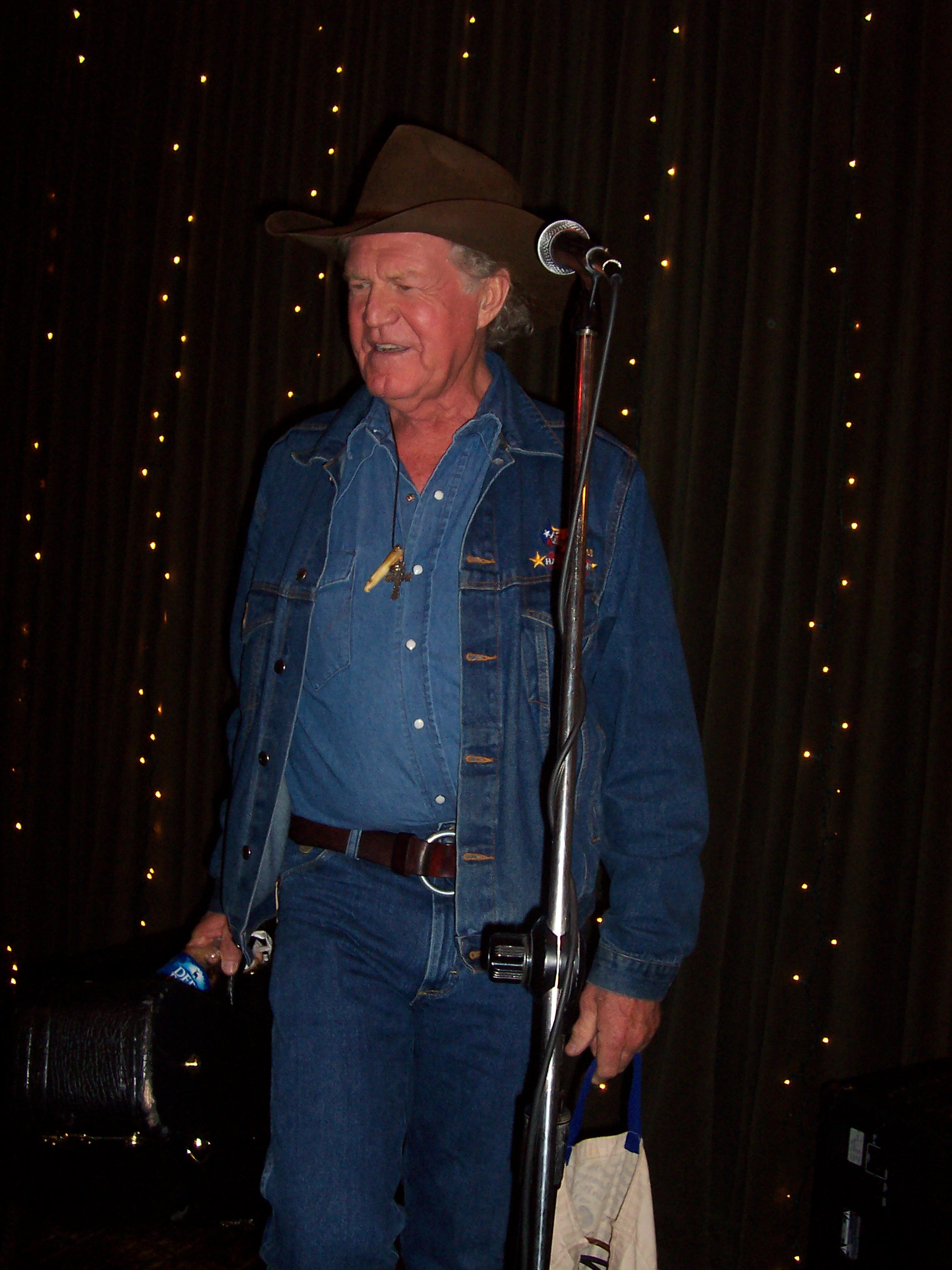
Inaugural winner Billy Joe Shaver

Year	Recipient	Ref.
2019	Elvis Costello	
2017	Van Morrison	
2016	William Bell	
2015	Gillian Welch and David Rawlings	
2014	Loretta Lynn	
2013	Robert Hunter	
2012	Richard Thompson	
2011	Lucinda Williams	
2010	John Mellencamp	
2009	John Fogerty	
2008	John Hiatt	
2007	Willie Nelson	
2006	Rodney Crowell	
2005	Guy Clark	
2004	Cowboy Jack Clement	
2003	John Prine	
2002	Billy Joe Shaver	

=== National Museum of African American Music/Americana Music Association Legacy of Americana Award ===
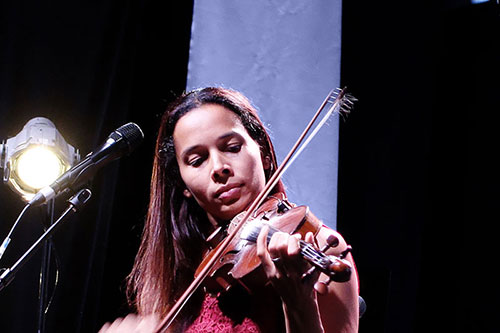
Rhiannon Giddens is the inaugural living winner

Year	Recipient	Ref.
2022	The Fairfield Four	
2021	Fisk Jubilee Singers	
2019	Rhiannon Giddens	
2019	Frank Johnson	

=== President's Award ===
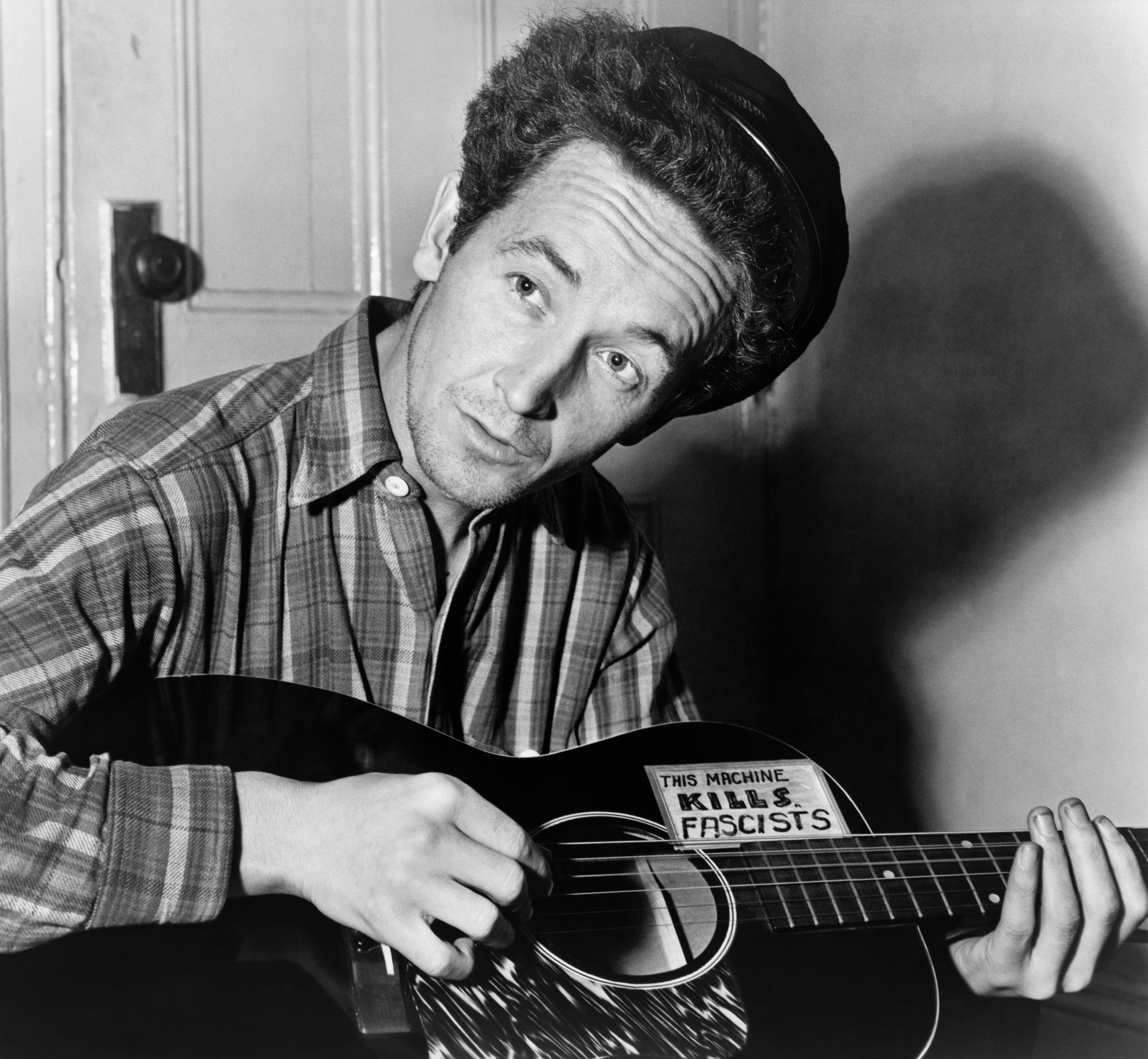
Folk artist Woody Guthrie was honoured posthumously in 2016

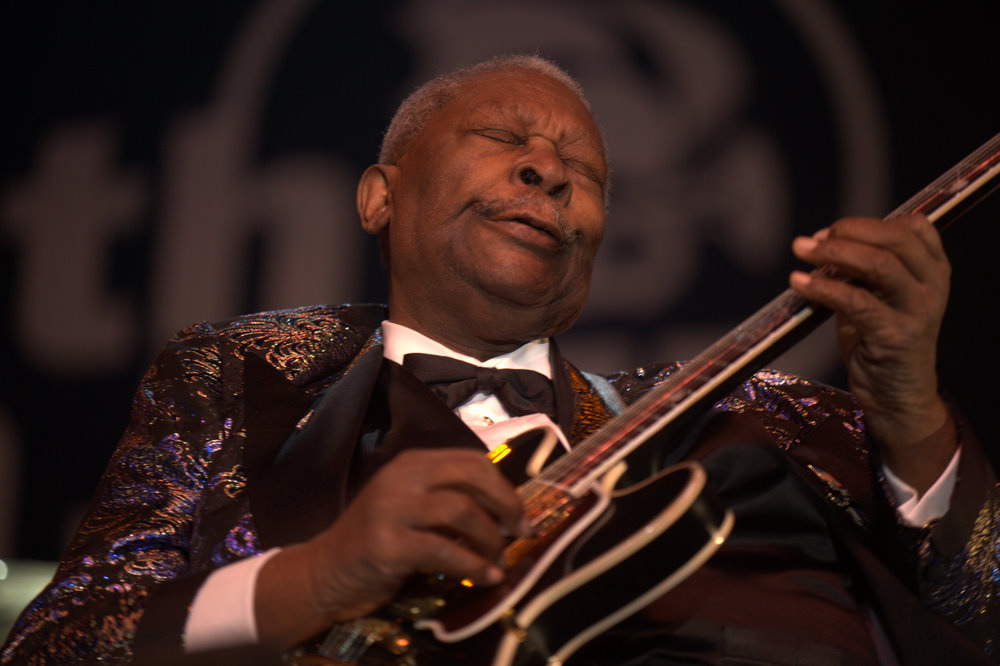
Blues performer B. B. King received the President's Award in 2015

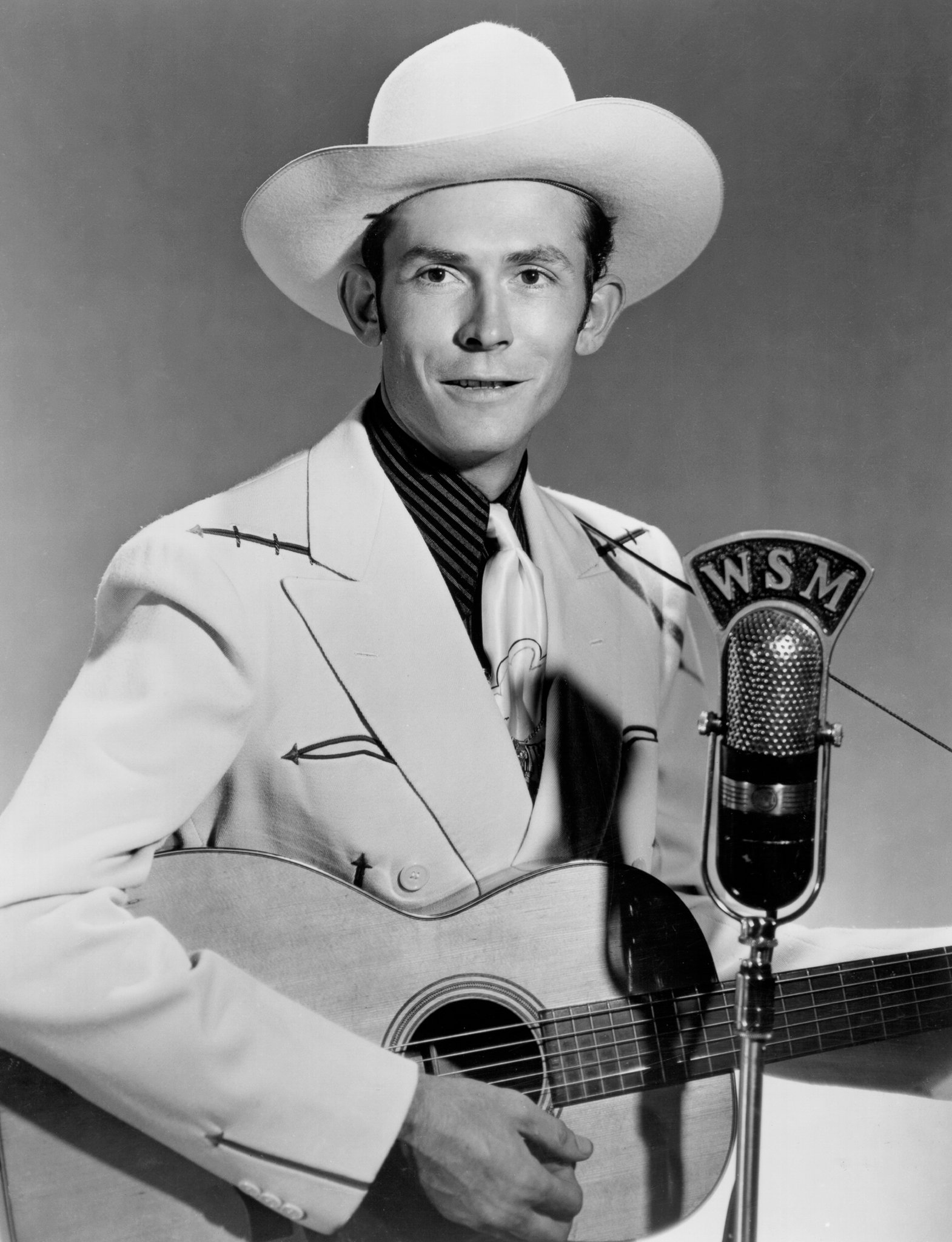
Iconic country singer Hank Williams was the 2013 recipient

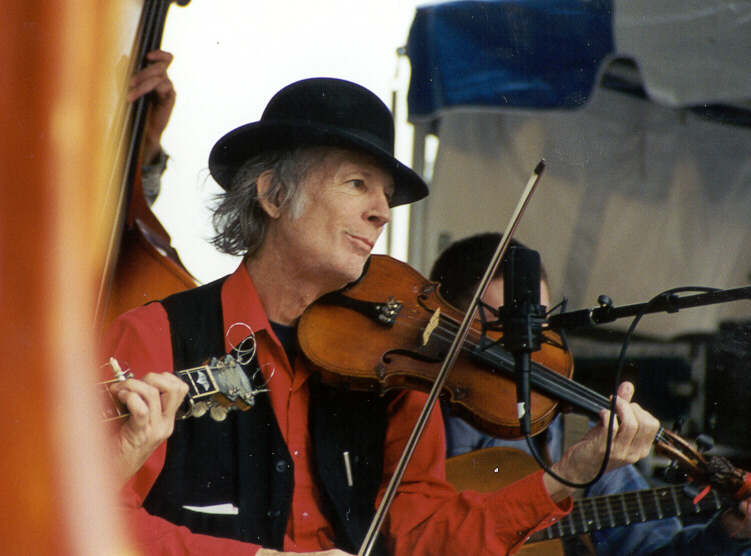
Bluegrass musician John Hartford was honoured in 2005

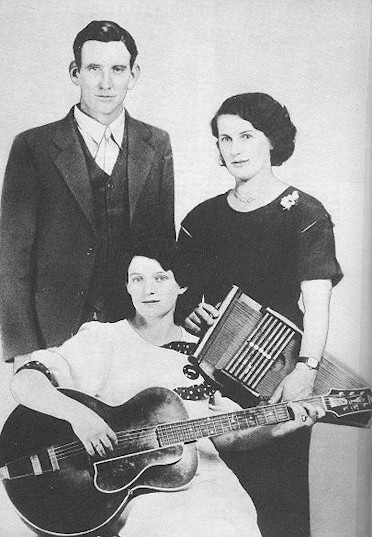
2004 honorees The Carter Family are often called the "first family" of country

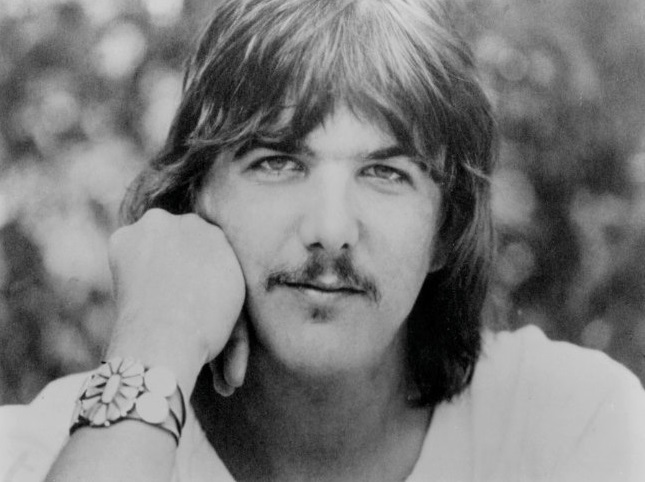
2003 honoree the late Gram Parsons called the "father of country rock"

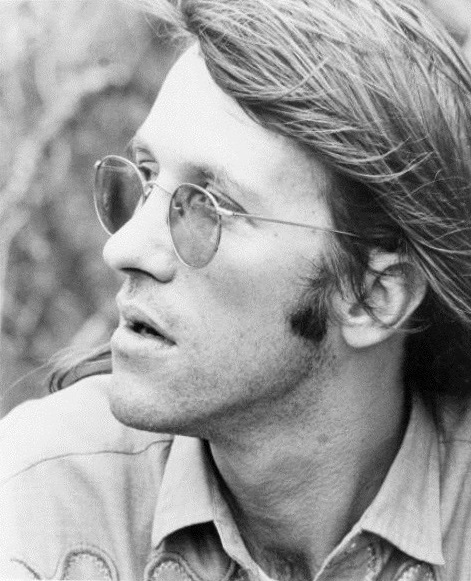
2002 Inaugural recipient, roots rocker Doug Sahm

Year	Recipient	Ref.
2022	Don Williams	
2019	Felice and Boudleaux Bryant	
2016	Woody Guthrie	
2015	B.B. King	
2014	Jimmie Rodgers	
2013	Hank Williams	
2009	Lowell George	
2008	Jerry Garcia	
2007	Townes Van Zandt	
2006	Mickey Newbury	
2005	John Hartford	
2004	Carter Family	
2003	Gram Parsons	
2002	Doug Sahm	

=== WagonMaster/Lifetime Achievement Award ===
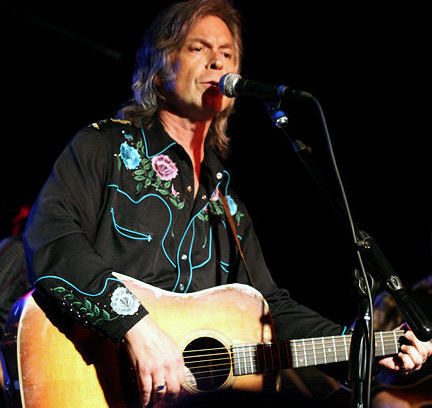
Jim Lauderdale was honoured in 2016

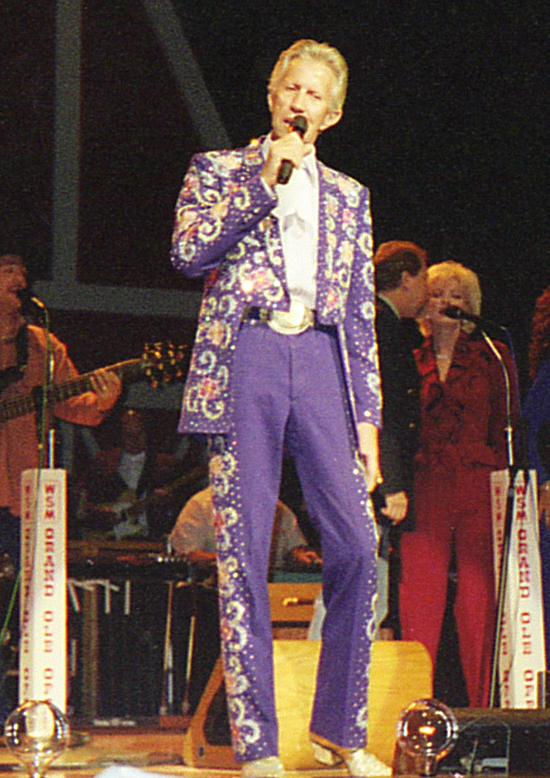
Country singer Porter Wagoner is the namesake of the award

Year	Recipient	Ref.
2022	Buddy Miller	
2016	Jim Lauderdale	
2007	Porter Wagoner	

== UK Americana Music Association Awards ==
The inaugural UK AMA awards were presented by the UK Americana Music Association were held at St John at Hackney in London on 3 February 2016 and was hosted by Bob Harris and Ethan Johns. The second annual UK Americana awards were held on 2 February 2017 and the third awards were held on 1 February 2018. The fifth awards were held on 30 January 2020. The 2021 ceremony was held virtually on 29 January due to the COVID-19 pandemic. The 2022 ceremony was held at the Hackney Empire and was hosted by Harris and Baylen Leonard on 26 January 2023.

=== UK Album of the Year ===
- 2023 – Superhuman by Ferris & Sylvester
- 2022 – Stand for Myself by Yola (produced by Dan Auerbach)
- 2021 – In This Town You're Owned by Robert Vincent
- 2020 – Walk Through Fire by Yola (produced by Dan Auerbach)
- 2019 – Shorebound by Ben Glover
- 2018 – I'll Make The Most of My Sins by Robert Vincent
- 2017 – Ghost by Lewis & Leigh (produced by Matt Ingram)
- 2016 – What Kind of Love by Danny and the Champions of the World (produced by Chris Clarke and Danny George Wilson)

=== International Album of the Year ===
- 2023 – Raise the Roof by Robert Plant and Alison Krauss (produced by T Bone Burnett)
- 2022 – Outside Child by Allison Russell (produced by Dan Knobler)
- 2021 – Old Flowers by Courtney Marie Andrews (produced by Andrew Sarlo)
- 2020 – The Highwomen by The Highwomen (produced by Dave Cobb)
- 2019 – May Your Kindness Remain by Courtney Marie Andrews
- 2018 – The Nashville Sound by Jason Isbell and the 400 Unit (produced by Dave Cobb)
- 2017 – Angeleno by Sam Outlaw (produced by Ry Cooder and Joachim Cooder)
- 2016 – Blackbirds by Gretchen Peters (produced by Doug Lancio, Barry Walsh and Gretchen Peters)

=== UK Artist of the Year ===
- 2023 – Elles Bailey
- 2022 – Yola
- 2021 – Robert Vincent
- 2020 – Yola
- 2019 – Bennett Wilson Poole
- 2018 – Emily Barker
- 2017 – Yola
- 2016 – Danny and the Champions of the World

=== International Artist of the Year ===
- 2023 – Allison Russell
- 2022 – Allison Russell
- 2021 – Courtney Marie Andrews
- 2020 – Brandi Carlile
- 2019 – Mary Gauthier
- 2018 – Courtney Marie Andrews
- 2017 – Sturgill Simpson
- 2016 – Jason Isbell

=== UK Song of the Year ===
- 2023 - “Car Crash” by Hannah White
- 2022 – "Willing" by Lady Nade
- 2021 – "I Don't Wanna Lie" by Yola, Dan Auerbach and Bobby Wood
- 2020 – "Little Piece of Heaven" by Elles Bailey, Bobby Wood and Dan Auerbach
- 2019 – "Southern Wind" by Dean Owens
- 2018 – "Home" by Yola Carter
- 2017 – "The 4:19" by Al Lewis and Alva Leigh (Lewis & Leigh)
- 2016 – "Clear Water" by Danny George Wilson and Paul Lush (Danny and the Champions of the World)

=== International Song of the Year ===
- 2023 – "You Are Not Alone" by Allison Russell featuring Brandi Carlile
- 2022 – "Right on Time" by Brandi Carlile
- 2021 – Hand Over My Heart by The Secret Sisters
- 2020 – "Me and the Ghost of Charlemagne" by Amy Speace
- 2019 – "The Joke" by Brandi Carlile
- 2018 – "Tenderheart" by Sam Outlaw
- 2017 – "Hands of Time" by Margo Price
- 2016 – "Blackbirds" by Gretchen Peters and Ben Glover (Gretchen Peters)

=== Bob Harris Emerging Artist of the Year ===
- 2023 – The Hanging Stars
- 2022 – Lauren Housley
- 2021 – Robbie Cavanaugh and Demi Marriner
- 2020 – Ferris & Sylvester
- 2019 – Curse of Lono
- 2018 – The Wandering Hearts
- 2017 – Wildwood Kin
- 2016 – Robert Vincent

=== UK Instrumentalist of the Year ===
- 2023 – Holly Carter (steel guitar)
- 2022 – Michelle Stodart (guitar)
- 2021 – Anna Corcoran (piano)
- 2020 – Siân Monaghan (drums)
- 2019 – CJ Hillman (multiple instruments)
- 2018 – Thomas Collison (multiple instruments)
- 2017 – CJ Hillman (multiple instruments)
- 2016 – B. J. Cole (steel guitar)

=== AMA Trailblazer ===
- 2023 – Nickel Creek
- 2022 – Beth Orton and The Long Ryders
- 2021 – Christine McVie and Steve Earle
- 2020 – Nick Lowe
- 2018 – Mumford & Sons
- 2017 – Albert Lee
- 2016 – Billy Bragg

=== AMA Lifetime Achievement Award ===
- 2024 - Dan Penn
- 2023 – Mike Scott and Judy Collins
- 2022 – Lucinda Williams
- 2021 – Elvis Costello and Mavis Staples
- 2020 – Joan Armatrading
- 2019 – Graham Nash
- 2018 – Robert Plant
- 2017 – Richard Thompson

=== Songwriters Legacy Award ===
- 2023 – Loretta Lynn
- 2021 – John Prine

=== Best Selling Americana Album ===
- 2023 – FTHC by Holly Carter
- 2022 – Greenfields by Barry Gibb
- 2021 – Song for Our Daughter by Laura Marling
- 2020 – Jade Bird by Jade Bird
- 2019 – Be More Kind by Frank Turner
- 2018 – Carry Fire by Robert Plant
- 2017 – Roll with the Punches by Van Morrison
- 2016 – Stay Gold by First Aid Kit

== Australian Americana Music Association Honours ==
The inaugural annual Australian American Music Honours Night, a celebration of Australian roots music, was held on October 2, 2017. The ceremony, which was televised on the Country Music Channel in early 2018, featured performances from many of Australia's top roots performers alongside Valerie June and Old Crow Medicine Show who acted as "US Americana Ambassadors". The inaugural ceremony also featured the presentation of two honours. The second event was held on October 11, 2018, and featured Margo Price and Joshua Hedley as Americana Ambassadors.

=== Vanguard Award ===
- 2017: Kasey Chambers
- 2017: Brian Taranto
- 2018: Shane Howard
- 2018: Brian Wise

== See also ==
- Americana (music)
- Americana Music Association
- Americana Music Festival & Conference
