= Lucinda Williams discography =

Singer, songwriter, and musician

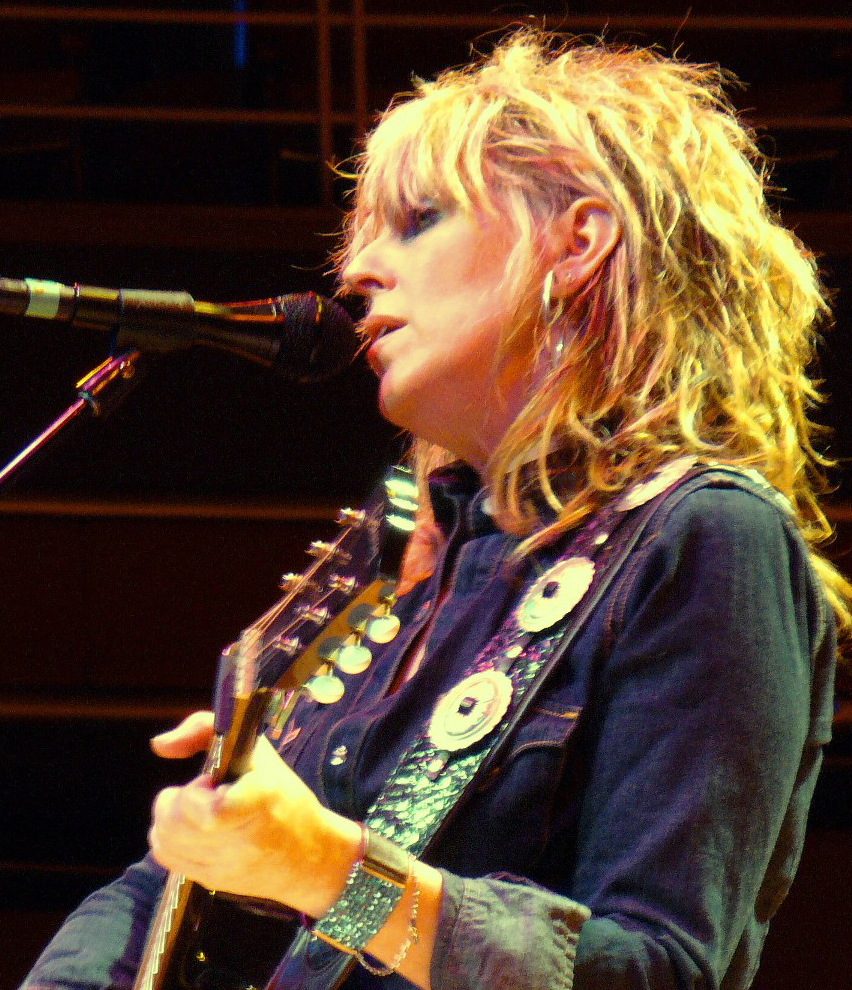
- Williams performing in 2006
- Studio albums: 16
- Live albums: 1
- Singles: 25
- Video albums: 2

The discography of Lucinda Williams, an American singer, songwriter, and musician, consists of 16 studio albums, one live album, two video albums, and 25 singles, on Folkways Records, Smithsonian Folkways, Rough Trade Records, Chameleon, Mercury Records, Lost Highway Records, New West Records, Highway 20 Records, and Thirty Tigers.

Williams released her first albums, Ramblin' on My Mind (1979) and Happy Woman Blues (1980), on Folkways Records and Smithsonian Folkways. In 1988, she signed with Rough Trade Records and released her self-titled third album, Lucinda Williams, to critical raves. Her fourth album, Sweet Old World, appeared four years later on Chameleon Records, to further critical acclaim. In 1998, Car Wheels on a Gravel Road was released by Mercury Records, to critical and commercial success. The album was certified Gold by the RIAA the following year, and remains her best-selling album to date.

After signing with Lost Highway records, Williams released the albums Essence (2001), World Without Tears (2003), West (2007), Little Honey (2008), and Blessed (2011), all to further critical and commercial success. Additionally, the live album Live @ The Fillmore was released in 2005. The double albums Down Where the Spirit Meets the Bone (2014) and The Ghosts of Highway 20 (2016) appeared on Williams' own Highway 20 Records label. In 2017, This Sweet Old World was released on Highway 20 Records in conjunction with Nashville, Tennessee based distribution company Thirty Tigers, followed by the critically acclaimed Good Souls Better Angels in 2020. Later that year, Williams began "Lu's Jukebox", a six-episode series of themed live performances. Williams's 15th studio album, Stories from a Rock n Roll Heart, was released in 2023.

A collaborative album with Charles Lloyd and the Marvels, titled Vanished Gardens, appeared in 2018 on the Blue Note Records label.

== Albums ==
=== Studio albums ===
Year	Title	Peak chart positions										Certifications (sales threshold)
Year	Title	US	US Rock	AUS	CAN	IRE	GER	NL	NZ	SWE	UK	Certifications (sales threshold)
1979	Ramblin' on My Mind: Released: 1979; Label: Folkways; Formats: CD, LP, cassette	—	—	—	—	—	—	—	—	—	—	
1980	Happy Woman Blues: Released: 1980; Label: Smithsonian Folkways; Formats: CD, LP, cassette	—	—	149	—	—	—	—	—	—	—	
1988	Lucinda Williams: Released: 1988; Label: Rough Trade; Formats: CD, LP, cassette	39^{[A]}	—	117	—	—	—	—	49	—	—	
1992	Sweet Old World: Released: August 25, 1992; Label: Chameleon; Formats: CD, cassette	—^{[B]}	—	134	—	—	—	—	—	—	—	
1998	Car Wheels on a Gravel Road: Released: June 30, 1998; Label: Mercury; Formats: CD, LP, cassette	65	—	69	—^{[C]}	—	—	—	—	60	—	RIAA: Gold; BPI: Silver
2001	Essence: Released: June 5, 2001; Label: Lost Highway; Formats: CD, LP	28	—	59	—	—	—	—	47	47	63	
2003	World Without Tears: Released: April 8, 2003; Label: Lost Highway; Formats: CD, LP	18	—	80	—	41	93	81	40	24	48	
2007	West: Released: February 13, 2007; Label: Lost Highway; Formats: CD, LP	14	5	53	—	60	95	29	33	10	30	
2008	Little Honey: Released: October 14, 2008; Label: Lost Highway; Formats: CD, LP	9	5	68	18	66	—	57	25	25	51	
2011	Blessed: Released: March 1, 2011; Label: Lost Highway; Formats: CD, LP	15	4	63	23	69	—	40	18	15	55	
2014	Down Where the Spirit Meets the Bone: Released: September 30, 2014; Label: Highway 20 Records; Formats: CD, LP	13	2	32	—	31	77	31	23	58	23	
2016	The Ghosts of Highway 20: Released: February 5, 2016; Label: Highway 20 Records; Formats: CD, LP	36	3	20	53	49	29	21	17	28	33	
2017	This Sweet Old World: Released: September 29, 2017; Label: Highway 20 Records, Thirty Tigers; Formats: CD, LP	—	17	—	—	—	—	101	—	—	—	
2020	Good Souls Better Angels: Released: April 24, 2020; Label: Highway 20 Records, Thirty Tigers; Formats: CD, LP	144	21	59	—	—	33	24	—	—	30	
2023	Stories from a Rock n Roll Heart: Released: June 30, 2023; Label: Highway 20 Records, Thirty Tigers; Formats: CD, LP	159	—	—	—	—	36	26	—	—	65	
2026	World's Gone Wrong: Released: January 23, 2026; Label: Highway 20 Records, Thirty Tigers; Formats: CD, LP	—	—	94	—	—	37	77	—	—	—	
Dash denotes releases that did not chart.

Notes

- ^{A} Did not chart when first released in 1988. When reissued in 2014 it reached No. 39.
- ^{B} Reached No. 25 on the Billboard Top Heatseekers chart.
- ^{C} Reached No. 14 on the Canadian RPM Country Albums chart.

=== Live albums ===
Year	Title	Peak chart positions				
Year	Title	US	AUS	AUS Country	NL	SWE
2005	Live @ The Fillmore: Released: May 10, 2005; Label: Lost Highway; Formats: CD, LP	66	110	4	69	43

=== Lu's Jukebox ===
Year	Title	Peak chart positions				
Year	Title	US Folk	US Blues	US Taste	GER	NL
2021	Lu's Jukebox Vol. 1 – Runnin' Down a Dream: A Tribute to Tom Petty: Released: April 16, 2021; Label: Highway 20 Records, Thirty Tigers; Formats: CD, LP, digital	12	—	10	32	—
2021	Lu's Jukebox Vol. 2 – Southern Soul: From Memphis to Muscle Shoals: Released: July 9, 2021; Label: Highway 20 Records, Thirty Tigers; Formats: CD, LP, digital	—	1	13	—	—
2021	Lu's Jukebox Vol. 3 – Bob's Back Pages: A Night of Bob Dylan Songs: Released: October 15, 2021; Label: Highway 20 Records, Thirty Tigers; Formats: CD, LP, digital	—	—	—	—	85
2021	Lu's Jukebox Vol. 4 – Funny How Time Slips Away: A Night of 60's Country Classics: Released: October 15, 2021; Label: Highway 20 Records, Thirty Tigers; Formats: CD, LP, digital	—	—	—	—	—
2021	Lu's Jukebox Vol. 5 – Have Yourself a Rockin' Little Christmas with Lucinda: Released: November 19, 2021; Label: Highway 20 Records, Thirty Tigers; Formats: CD, LP, digital	—	—	—	—	—
2022	Lu's Jukebox Vol. 6 – You Are Cordially Invited...A Tribute to the Rolling Stones: Released: January 28, 2022; Label: Highway 20 Records, Thirty Tigers; Formats: CD, LP, digital	23	—	19	58	60
2024	Lu's Jukebox Vol. 7 – Lucinda Williams sings the Beatles from Abbey Road: Released: December 6, 2024; Label: Highway 20 Records, Thirty Tigers; Formats: CD, LP, digital	—	—	23	—	—
Dash denotes releases that did not chart.

=== Other albums ===
Year	Title	Peak chart positions			
Year	Title	US Jazz	US T/Jazz	US Taste	NL
2018	Vanished Gardens: Released: June 29, 2018; Label: Blue Note Records; Formats: CD, LP	3	2	18	161

== Singles ==
Year	Song	US Adult	US Rock	US Triple A	AUS	Album
1981	"Happy Woman Blues/I Lost It"	—	—	—	—	Happy Woman Blues
1989	"Changed the Locks"	—	16	—	—	Lucinda Williams
1989	"The Night's Too Long"	—	—	—	—	Lucinda Williams
1989	"I Just Wanted to See You So Bad"	—	—	—	122	Lucinda Williams
1989	"Passionate Kisses"	—	—	—	169	Lucinda Williams
1992	"Six Blocks Away"	—	—	—	170	Sweet Old World
1992	"Hot Blood"	—	—	—	—	Sweet Old World
1993	"Lines Around Your Eyes"	—	—	—	146	Sweet Old World
1993	"Something About What Happens When We Talk"	—	—	—	—	Sweet Old World
1998	"Right in Time"	—	—	—	—	Car Wheels on a Gravel Road
1998	"Can't Let Go"	—	—	14	—	Car Wheels on a Gravel Road
2001	"Essence"	—	—	9	—	Essence
2001	"Get Right With God"	—	—	—	—	Essence
2003	"Righteously"	36	—	8	—	World Without Tears
2003	"Real Live Bleeding Fingers And Broken Guitar Strings"	—	—	—	—	World Without Tears
2007	"Are You Alright?"	—	—	24	—	West
2007	"Words"	—	—	—	—	West
2007	"Come On"	—	—	—	—	West
2007	"West"	—	—	—	—	West
2008	"Real Love"	—	—	22	297	Little Honey
2011	"Buttercup"	—	—	26	777	Blessed
2014	"Burning Bridges"	—	—	—	—	Down Where the Spirit Meets the Bone
2016	"Just a Little More Faith and Grace"	—	—	—	—	The Ghosts of Highway 20
2017	"Six Blocks Away"	—	—	—	—	This Sweet Old World
2020	"Lost Girl"	—	—	—	—	non-album single
2020	"Man Without a Soul"	—	—	—	—	Good Souls Better Angels
2020	"You Can't Rule Me"	—	—	38	—	Good Souls Better Angels
2023	"New York Comeback"	—	—	36	—	Stories from a Rock n Roll Heart
2023	"Stolen Moments"	—	—	—	—	Stories from a Rock n Roll Heart
2023	"Where the Song Will Find Me"	—	—	—	—	Stories from a Rock n Roll Heart
Dash denotes releases that did not chart.

== Video albums ==
Title	Album details
Lucinda Williams – Live from Austin, TX	Released: May 13, 2005; Label: New West Records; Formats: DVD
Lucinda Williams – Live From Austin TX '89	Released: November 7, 2008; Label: New West Records; Formats: DVD

== Guest and compilation appearances ==
Credits adapted from AllMusic.

- 1982 – Various Artists - "One Night Stand" on Kerrville Folk Festival 1980
- 1988 – Various Artists – "Dark Side of Life" on A Town South of Bakersfield, Vols. 1 & 2
- 1990 – Various Artists – "Which Will" (first version) on True Voices
- 1990 – The Band of Blacky Ranchette – "Burning Desire" on Sage Advice
- 1991 – Various Artists - "I Asked for Water (He Gave Me Gasoline)" on KUT-90.5 FM LiveSet: On Air Volume 2
- 1992 – David Rodriguez – "Deportee (Plane Wreck at Los Gatos)" on The True Cross
- 1993 – Various Artists – "Pancakes" on Born to Choose
- 1993 – Various Artists – "Main Road" on Sweet Relief: A Benefit for Victoria Williams
- 1993 – Jimmie Dale Gilmore – "Reunion" on Spinning Around the Sun
- 1993 – Michael Fracasso – "Door No. 1" on Love & Trust
- 1994 – Various Artists – "You Don't Have Very Far to Go" on Tulare Dust: A Songwriter's Tribute to Merle Haggard
- 1994 – Various Artists – "Positively 4th Street" on In Their Own Words, Vol. 1 – Live Performances from the Bottom Line, New York City
- 1994 – Julian Dawson – "How Can I Sleep Without You" on How Human Hearts Behave
- 1994 – Lisa Mednick – "A Different Sky" on Artifacts of Love
- 1994 - Various Artists – "Which Will" on Rare On Air (Live Performances Vol. One)
- 1995 – Terry Allen – "Room to Room", "Black to Black" and "Flatland Boogie" on Human Remains
- 1995 – Kieran Kane – "This Dirty Little Town" on Dead Rekoning
- 1995 – Chris Gaffney – "Cowboys to Girls" on Loser's Paradise
- 1995 – Buddy Miller - "You Wrecked Up My Heart" on Your Love and Other Lies
- 1996 – Various Artists – "The Night's Too Long" on Lone Star: Original Soundtrack from the Film
- 1996 – Steve Earle – "You're Still Standing There" on I Feel Alright
- 1997 – RB Morris – "Glory Dreams" on Take That Ride
- 1997 – Ray Wylie Hubbard – "The Ballad of the Crimson Kings" on Dangerous Spirits
- 1997 – Donnie Fritts – "Breakfast in Bed" on Everybody's Got a Song
- 1997 – Bo Ramsey – "Desert Flower" on In the Weeds
- 1998 – Hayseed – "Precious Memories" and "Credo" on Melic
- 1998 – Robbie Fulks – "Pretty Little Poison" on Let's Kill Saturday Night
- 1998 – Various Artists – "Here in California" on Treasures Left Behind: Remembering Kate Wolf
- 1998 – Nanci Griffith – "Wings of a Dove" and "Deportee (Plane Wreck at Los Gatos)" on Other Voices, Too (A Trip Back to Bountiful)
- 1998 – Various Artists – "Come to Me Baby" on Wolf Tracks: A Tribute to Howlin' Wolf
- 1998 – Various Artists - "Still I Long for Your Kiss" on The Horse Whisperer (Songs From and Inspired by the Motion Picture)
- 1999 – Bonepony – "Sweet Bye and Bye" on Traveler's Companion
- 1999 – Bruce Cockburn – "When You Give It Away", "Isn't That What Friends Are For?", "Look How Far" and "Use Me While You Can" on Breakfast in New Orleans, Dinner in Timbuktu
- 1999 – Julian Dawson – "How Can I Sleep Without You" on Spark
- 1999 – Leftover Salmon – "Lines Around Your Eyes" on The Nashville Sessions
- 1999 – Various Artists – "Return of the Grievous Angel" with David Crosby on Return of the Grievous Angel: Tribute to Gram Parsons
- 1999 – John Prine – "Wedding Bells"/"Let's Turn Back The Years" on In Spite of Ourselves
- 1999 – Little Milton – "Love Hurts" on Welcome to Little Milton
- 1999 – Evie Sands – "Cool Blues Story" on Women in Prison
- 1999 – Chip Taylor – "Through Their Mother's Eyes" and "If I Don't Know Love" on Seven Days in May...a love story
- 1999 – Various Artists - "Can't Let Go" on KBCO Studio C Volume 11
- 1999 – Various Artists - "Little Angel, Little Brother" on The Folkscene Collection - Volume Two
- 2000 – Sue Foley – "Empty Cup" on Love Comin' Down
- 2000 – Kevin Gordon – "Down to the Well" on Down to the Well
- 2000 – Chip Taylor – "Head First", "Annie on Your Mind" and "The Ghost of Phil Sinclair" on The London Sessions Bootleg
- 2001 – Kasey Chambers – "On a Bad Day" on Barricades & Brickwalls
- 2001 – Matthew Ryan – "Devastation" on Concussion
- 2001 – Various Artists – "Cold, Cold Heart" on Timeless: Hank Williams Tribute
- 2001 – Ralph Stanley and Friends – "Farther Along" on Clinch Mountain Sweethearts
- 2001 – Various Artists – "Nothin'" on A Tribute to Townes Van Zandt
- 2001 – Chip Taylor – "Could I Live with This" and "The Ship" on Black and Blue America
- 2001 – Various Artists – "Angels Laid Him Away" on Avalon Blues: A Tribute to the Music of Mississippi John Hurt
- 2002 – Various Artists – "Lately" on Going Driftless: An Artist's Tribute to Greg Brown
- 2003 – Various Artists – "Hang Down Your Head" on Crossing Jordan – Original Soundtrack
- 2003 – Terri Binion – "GayleAnne" on Fool
- 2003 – Various Artists – "Hard Times Killing Floor Blues" on Martin Scorsese Presents the Blues: The Soul of a Man
- 2003 – Colin Linden – "Don't Tell Me" on Big Mouth
- 2003 – Various Artists - "Buick Blues (Version One)" on Lost Highway Lost & Found Vol. 1
- 2003 – Various Artists - "Can't Let Go" on ONXRT: Live from the Archives Vol. 6
- 2004 – Graham Parker – "Cruel Lips" on Your Country
- 2004 – Flogging Molly – "Factory Girls" on Within a Mile of Home
- 2004 – Elvis Costello – "There's a Story in Your Voice" on The Delivery Man
- 2004 – Willie Nelson – "Overtime" on It Always Will Be
- 2004 – Willie Nelson – "Overtime" (live) on Outlaws and Angels
- 2004 – Various Artists – "Pyramid of Tears" on Por Vida – A Tribute to the Songs of Alejandro Escovedo
- 2004 – Various Artists – "Down to the Well" with Kevin Gordon on No Depression: What It Sounds Like, Vol. 1
- 2004 – Tony Joe White – "Closing In on the Fire" on The Heroines
- 2004 – Susan Cowsill – "Nanny's Song" on Just Believe It
- 2005 – North Mississippi Allstars – "Hurry Up Sunrise" on Electric Blue Watermelon
- 2006 – Tim Easton – "Back to the Pain" on Ammunition
- 2006 – Ramblin' Jack Elliott – "Careless Darling" on I Stand Alone
- 2006 – P.F. Sloan – "Sins of a Family" on Sailover
- 2006 – John Brannen – "A Cut So Deep" on Twilight Tattoo
- 2006 – Anne McCue – "Hellfire Raiser" on Koala Motel
- 2006 – Various Artists – "Bonnie Portmore" on Rogue's Gallery: Pirate Ballads, Sea Songs, and Chanteys
- 2006 – Doug Pettibone – "Two of Us" and "She Belongs to Me" on The West Gate
- 2007 – Various Artists – "Honey Chile" on Goin' Home: A Tribute to Fats Domino
- 2007 – John Platania – "In Memory of Zapata" on Blues, Waltzes & Badland Borders
- 2008 – Various Artists – "Mamas Don't Let Your Babies Grow Up to Be Cowboys" on The Imus Ranch Record
- 2008 – Carrie Rodriguez – Mask of Moses on "She Ain't Me"
- 2009 – Susan Marshall – "Don't Let Me Down" on Little Red
- 2009 – Various Artists – "Positively 4th Street" (studio version) on The Village: A Celebration of the Music of Greenwich Village
- 2009 – M. Ward – "Oh Lonesome Me" on Hold Time
- 2009 – Susan Cowsill – "Nanny's Song" on Just Believe It (Americana Remix)
- 2010 – Various Artists – "Kiss Like Your Kiss" (with Elvis Costello) on True Blood – Music from the HBO Original Series Volume 2 [Soundtrack]
- 2010 – Various Artists – "The Ballad of Lucy Jordan" on Twistable, Turnable Man: A Musical Tribute to the Songs of Shel Silverstein
- 2010 – Ray Davies – "Long Way from Home" on See My Friends
- 2010 – Jimmy Webb – "Galveston" on Just Across The River
- 2010 – Various Artists – "Somebody Somewhere (Don't Know What He's Missin' Tonight)" on Coal Miner's Daughter: A Tribute to Loretta Lynn
- 2011 – Over the Rhine – "Undamned" on The Long Surrender
- 2011 – Michael Monroe – "Gone, Baby Gone" on Sensory Overdrive
- 2011 – Amos Lee – "Clear Blue Eyes" on Mission Bell
- 2011 – Blackie & The Rodeo Kings – "If I Can't Have You" on Kings & Queens
- 2011 – Steve Cropper – "Dedicated to the One I Love" and "When I Get Like This" on Dedicated: A Salute to the 5 Royales
- 2011 – Son of the Velvet Rat – "Moment of Fame" and "White Patch of Canvas" on Red Chamber Music
- 2011 – Tom Russell – "A Hard Rain's A-Gonna Fall" on Mesabi
- 2011 – Various Artists – "I'm So Happy I Found You" on The Lost Notebooks of Hank Williams
- 2011 – Various Artists - "Get Right With God" on Live at the World Café: 20th Anniversary Edition
- 2012 – Marvin Etzioni – "Lay It on the Table" on Marvin Country!
- 2012 – Lil' Band o' Gold – "I'm Ready" on Lil' Band o' Gold Plays Fats
- 2012 – Walter Rose – "Driving South" on Cast Your Stone
- 2012 – Various Artists – "Tryin' to Get to Heaven" on Chimes of Freedom: The Songs of Bob Dylan Honoring 50 Years of Amnesty International
- 2012 – Various Artists – "God I'm Missing You" on KIN: Songs by Mary Karr & Rodney Crowell
- 2012 – Various Artists – "Hurt" on We Walk the Line: A Celebration of the Music of Johnny Cash
- 2012 – Various Artists – "That Time Of Night" on Oh Michael, Look What You've Done: Friends Play Michael Chapman
- 2012 – Various Artists – "The Farm" on The Inner Flame: A Rainer Ptacek Tribute
- 2012 – Various Artists – "Mississippi You're On My Mind" on Quiet About It: A Tribute To Jesse Winchester
- 2012 – Various Artists – "Whispering Pines" on Love for Levon
- 2012 – Various Artists – "House of Earth" on Woody Guthrie at 100: Live at the Kennedy Center
- 2012 – Various Artists - "Ain't It Odd/Listen to the Animals" on The Squidbillies Present Music for Americans Only Made by Americans in China for Americans Only God Bless America, U.S.A.
- 2013 – Various Artists – "Everything But the Truth" (first version) on The Lone Ranger: Wanted
- 2013 – Various Artists – "This Old Guitar" on The Music Is You: A Tribute to John Denver
- 2013 – Various Artists – "Partners in Crime" on Songs for Slim: Rockin' Here Tonight—A Benefit Compilation for Slim Dunlap
- 2013 – Mark Seymour & The Undertow - "Come On" on The Seventh Heaven Club
- 2013 – Various Artists - "Passionate Kisses" on KUTX Live Vol. 2
- 2014 – Chip Taylor – "Sleep with Open Windows" and "I'll Only Be Me Once" on The Little Prayers Trilogy
- 2014 – Various Artists – "The Pretender" on Looking into You: A Tribute To Jackson Browne
- 2014 – Matt Blake - "Whichever Way the Wind Blows" on All the Dirt in Town
- 2015 – Buick 6 – "So Much Trouble in the World" on Plays Well with Others
- 2015 – G. Love and Special Sauce – "New York City" on Love Saves the Day
- 2015 – Don Henley – "Train in the Distance" on Cass County
- 2015 – Boz Scaggs – "Whispering Pines" (duet version) on A Fool to Care
- 2015 – Various Artists – "Met an Old Friend" on Remembering Mountains: Unheard Songs by Karen Dalton
- 2016 – Buddy Miller – "Hickory Wind" (duet version) on Cayamo Sessions at Sea
- 2016 – Various Artists – "It's Nobody's Fault But Mine" and "God Don't Never Change" on God Don't Never Change: The Songs of Blind Willie Johnson
- 2016 – Various Artists – "Hickory Wind" on The Life & Songs of Emmylou Harris
- 2016 – Various Artists - "Going Down the Road Feelin' Bad" on Day of the Dead
- 2016 – Various Artists - "I'm Crying" on Free State of Jones (Original Motion Picture Soundtrack)
- 2016 – Various Artists - "East Side of Town" on KCSN CD Sampler - Collector's Edition Volume X
- 2017 – Charles Lloyd & The Marvels – "Masters of War" (single)
- 2017 – Ray Wylie Hubbard - "Tell the Devil I'm Gettin' There As Fast As I Can" on Tell the Devil… …I'm Gettin' There As Fast As I Can
- 2018 – Pedro Abrunhosa - "Se Tens De Partir Não Me Contes/Hold Me" on Espiritual
- 2018 – Charles Lloyd & The Marvels – "Dust", "Ventura", "We've Come Too Far to Turn Around", "Unsuffer Me" and "Angel" on Vanished Gardens
- 2019 – Jesse Malin - "Room 13", "Shane", "Dead On" on Sunset Kids (album co-produced by Williams)
- 2019 – Various Artists - "Christmas in Prison" (with Hiss Golden Messenger) on You Wish: A Merge Records Holiday Album
- 2019 – Mercury Rev - "Ode to Billie Joe on Bobbie Gentry's The Delta Sweete Revisited
- 2020 – Various Artists - "Life's a Gas" on Angelheaded Hipster: The Songs of Marc Bolan & T. Rex
- 2020 – Various Artists - "You Can't Rule Me" on Mojo Festival 2020
- 2020 – Various Artists - "Going Where the Lonely Go" on Sing Me Back Home: The Music of Merle Haggard
- 2021 – Sharon Van Etten – "Save Yourself" on Epic Ten
- 2021 - Robert Plant & Alison Krauss - "Somebody Was Watching Over Me" on Raise the Roof
- 2021 – Various Artists - "When the Way Gets Dark" on Songs From Quarantine Vol. 1
- 2021 – Lawrence Rothman - "Decent Man" on Good Morning, America
- 2021 – Various Artists - "You're Gonna Miss Me" on May the Circle Remain Unbroken: A Tribute to Roky Erickson
- 2022 – Various Artists – "Factory" on Ladies Sing the Boss: The Songs of Bruce Springsteen
- 2022 – Various Artists - "Live Forever" (with Willie Nelson) on Live Forever: A Tribute to Billy Joe Shaver
- 2023 – Various Artists – "Deeper Well" on Can't Steal My Fire: The Songs of David Olney
- 2024 – Ian Hunter – "What Would I Do Without You" on Defiance, Pt. 2: Fiction
- 2024 – Various Artists – "Room 13" (with Elvis Costello) on Silver Patron Saints: The Songs of Jesse Malin
- 2024 – Mike Campbell & The Dirty Knobs - "Hell or High Waters" on Vagabonds, Virgins & Misfits
- 2024 – Colin James - "Protection" on Chasing the Sun
- 2024 – Various Artists - "Legendary Hearts" on The Power of the Heart: A Tribute to Lou Reed
- 2024 – Loose Cattle - "Joanne" on Someone's Monster
- 2024 – Alicia Blue - "Tennessee" on In Love With My Enemy (Women's Clinic Off Lake Ave) EP
- 2024 – Various Artists - "Joy" on Live on Mountain Stage 40th Anniversary: Outlaws and Outliers
- 2024 – Various Artists - "Born in the U.S.A." on Bruce Springsteen's Nebraska: A Celebration in Words and Music
- 2025 – Chrissie Hynde - "Sway" on Duets Special
- 2025 – Various Artists - "Somebody Loan Me a Dime" on Sweet Relief: We Can Help
- 2025 – Various Artists - "Release Me" (with Tommy McLain and Keith Frank) on A Tribute to the King of Zydeco
