= I Just Wanted to See You So Bad =

1989 single by Lucinda Williams

Single by Lucinda Williams

from the album Lucinda Williams
- B-side: "Something About What Happens When We Talk"
- Released: 1989
- Recorded: June 1988
- Studio: Mad Dog (Venice, Los Angeles)
- Genre: Blues, Folk, World, Country
- Length: 2:25
- Label: Rough Trade
- Songwriter: Lucinda Williams
- Producers: Williams; Dusty Wakeman; Gurf Morlix

Lucinda Williams singles chronology
"The Night's Too Long" (1989)	"I Just Wanted to See You So Bad" (1989)	"Passionate Kisses" (1989)

"I Just Wanted to See You So Bad" is a song written and performed by American singer-songwriter Lucinda Williams. It was released in 1989 as the third single from her self-titled third album (1988).

The song appeared in the fourth episode of the Amazon series One Mississippi, which aired on September 9, 2016. Emmylou Harris and Rodney Crowell covered the song on their duet album The Traveling Kind (2015).

== Critical reception ==
Country music website The Boot ranked the song No. 5 on their list of the best Lucinda Williams songs, describing it as a "upbeat, organ-swirled song", writing "After starting off rather innocuously (I drove my car in the middle of the night/I just wanted to see you so bad), the brisk, twangy song evolves into something more like obsession: 'We'd always talked on the telephone/But I'd never been with you all alone,' Williams casually sings, before letting it slip that the visit is perhaps a surprise. 'I got off on the seventh floor, I just wanted to see you so bad'."

A retrospective review of Lucinda Williams by The Austin Chronicle stated the song "still jumps from the speakers as if we're hearing it for the first time", calling it a "glittering example of what exemplary roots rock can be."

== Track listing ==
7" single

- "I Just Wanted To See You So Bad" – 2:25
- "Something About What Happens When We Talk" – 3:17

CD single

- "I Just Wanted To See You So Bad" – 2:25
- "Something About What Happens When We Talk" – 3:17
- "Sundays" – 3:29
- "Changed The Locks" – 3:47
- "Like A Rose" – 2:37

== Chart performance ==
Chart (1989)	Peak position
Australia (ARIA)	122
