= Six Blocks Away =

1992 single by Lucinda Williams

Single by Lucinda Williams

from the album Sweet Old World
- B-side: "Which Will"
- Released: 1992
- Genre: Alternative country, Americana, Blues, roots rock
- Length: 2:52 (Album version)
- Label: Chameleon
- Songwriter(s): Lucinda Williams
- Producer(s): Williams; Dusty Wakeman; Gurf Morlix

Lucinda Williams singles chronology
"Passionate Kisses" (1989)	"Six Blocks Away" (1992)	"Something About What Happens When We Talk" (1992)

"Six Blocks Away" is a song written and performed by American singer-songwriter Lucinda Williams. It was released in 1992 as the first single from her fourth album, Sweet Old World (1992).

Williams re-recorded Sweet Old World for its 25th anniversary in 2017, and released it under the new title This Sweet Old World. "Six Blocks Away" was again released as the lead single, and Rolling Stone described the re-recorded version as "reinvigorated with a chiming, jangly Rickenbacker guitar line that evokes everyone from Tom Petty to the Byrds to R.E.M."

== Critical reception ==
LA Weekly ranked "Six Blocks Away" at No. 9 on their list of Williams' best 11 songs, calling it "one of her best jangle pop/country songs" while observing "the song's lyrics offer none of the music's bright optimism. Perhaps that is why the track works so well." Rolling Stone described it as a "near-pop single", writing "Duane Jarvis's and Gurf Morlix's guitars jangle through the mix, though Williams's singing colors with a rural Louisiana rawness."

== Track listing ==
US CD single

- "Six Blocks Away" (Radio Edit) – 2:48

Australia CD single

- "Six Blocks Away" – 2:52
- "Which Will" – 3:49

== Chart performance ==
Chart (1989)	Peak position
Australia (ARIA)	170
