= Changed the Locks =

1988 single by Lucinda Williams

Single by Lucinda Williams

from the album Lucinda Williams
- B-side: "Goin' Back Home"
- Released: 1989
- Recorded: June 1988
- Studio: Mad Dog (Venice, Los Angeles)
- Genre: Blues; folk; world; country
- Length: 3:39
- Label: Rough Trade
- Songwriter: Lucinda Williams
- Producers: Williams; Dusty Wakeman; Gurf Morlix

Lucinda Williams singles chronology
"Happy Woman Blues/I Lost It" (1981)	"Changed the Locks" (1989)	"The Night's Too Long" (1989)

"Changed the Locks" is a song written and performed by American singer-songwriter Lucinda Williams. It was released in 1989 as the lead single from her eponymous third album (1988).

Tom Petty and the Heartbreakers covered the song for the soundtrack album to the 1996 film She's The One, and it reached No. 20 on the Mainstream Rock chart.

== Critical reception ==
Country music website Holler listed "Changed the Locks" as No. 3 of the best Lucinda Williams songs; "Over the course of this slow burner from her self-titled release, Lucinda rises from the depths of debilitation of abuse to finally face her offender. With surmounting strength, the artist reclaims her power with every boot-stomping verse. Contagious rock tones spur solidarity for listeners who have struggled to take the steps detailed throughout the anthem." LA Weekly ranked it at No. 11 on their list of Williams' best 11 songs, calling it "one of her most hard hitting numbers", writing "Her sneering vocal performance fits the song's ill-tempered mood." NPR described it as a "barn burner", while music website Return of Rock ranked it No. 1 on their list of Williams' 12 songs.

== Track listing ==
7" single

- "Changed The Locks" – 3:39
- "Goin' Back Home" – 3:22

== Charts ==
Chart (2015)	Peak position
US Billboard Hard Rock Digital Song Sales	16

== Tom Petty and the Heartbreakers version ==
"Change the Locks"

Promotional single by Tom Petty and the Heartbreakers

from the album Songs and Music from "She's the One"
- Released: 1996
- Genre: Rock
- Length: 4:56
- Label: Warner Bros.
- Songwriter: Lucinda Williams
- Producers: Rick Rubin; Tom Petty; Mike Campbell

Tom Petty and the Heartbreakers singles chronology
"Walls (Circus)" (1996)	"Change the Locks" (1996)	"Free Girl Now" (1999)

Tom Petty and the Heartbreakers released their cover of the song as a promotional single from the soundtrack album Songs and Music from "She's the One" (1996). AllMusic's Stephen Thomas Erlewine called it an "excellent cover, performed with affection and vigor."

=== Track listing ===
Promotional CD single

- "Change The Locks" – 4:56

=== Charts ===
Chart (1996)	Peak position
US Billboard Mainstream Rock	20
