= The Night's Too Long =

1989 single by Lucinda Williams

Single by Lucinda Williams

from the album Lucinda Williams
- B-side: "Price To Pay"
- Released: 1989
- Recorded: June 1988
- Studio: Mad Dog (Venice, Los Angeles)
- Genre: Heartland rock
- Length: 3:10
- Label: Rough Trade
- Songwriter: Lucinda Williams
- Producers: Gurf Morlix; Dusty Wakeman; Lucinda Williams

Lucinda Williams singles chronology
"Changed the Locks" (1989)	"The Night's Too Long" (1989)	"I Just Wanted to See You So Bad" (1989)

"The Night's Too Long" is a song written and performed by American singer-songwriter Lucinda Williams. It was released in 1989 as the second single from her self-titled third album (1988).

The song was recorded by American country music artist Patty Loveless. It was released in 1990 as the second single from her fourth studio album On Down the Line.

== Content ==
The song is about a restless young woman who decides to move from her small town to the big city, where she can take in the nightlife and meet the man of her dreams. The first part of the song has her sacrificing to set up her move, which takes place in the second half of the song. Her new office job (in the song's third verse) takes a back seat to her going out to the bars, where she dances and eventually consummates a relationship with the man she had been looking for.

== Critical reception ==
Robin Denselow, writing in The Guardian, called the song an "epic narrative", stating that it "echoes Springsteen at his best."

== Track listing ==
7" single

- "The Night's Too Long" – 4:15
- "Price to Pay" – 2:46

== Patty Loveless version ==
"The Night's Too Long"

Single by Patty Loveless

from the album On Down the Line
- B-side: "Overtime"
- Released: September 23, 1990
- Genre: Country
- Length: 3:10
- Label: MCA Nashville
- Songwriter: Lucinda Williams
- Producer: Tony Brown

Patty Loveless singles chronology
"On Down The Line" (1989)	"The Night's Too Long" (1990)	"I'm That Kind of Girl" (1991)

=== Critical reception ===
Lisa Smith and Cyndi Hoelzle described the song favorably in Gavin Report, where they wrote that "Patty plaintively sings the story of a woman trying to break out of her small-town life."

=== Track listing ===
7" single

- "The Night's Too Long" – 3:56
- "Overtime " – 2:48

=== Charts ===
The song charted for 19 weeks on the Billboard Hot Country Singles & Tracks chart, reaching No. 20 during the week of December 8, 1990.

Chart (1990)	Peak position
Canada Country Singles (RPM)	6
US Hot Country Songs (Billboard)	20
