= Blaze Foley's 113th Wet Dream =

Studio album by Gurf Morlix
- Released: March 28, 2011
- Genre: Americana
- Length: 55:33
- Label: Self-released
- Producer: Gurf Morlix

Gurf Morlix chronology
Last Exit to Happyland (2008)	Blaze Foley's 113th Wet Dream (2011)	Finds the Present Tense (2013)

Blaze Foley's 113th Wet Dream is a tribute album to Blaze Foley by Americana musician Gurf Morlix. The album, which consists of Morlix's covers of 15 of Foley's songs, was self-released on March 28, 2011.

== Critical reception ==
Professional ratings
Review scores
Source	Rating
AllMusic	3.5/5 stars
Country Standard Time	(favorable)
Creative Loafing	4/5 stars
No Depression	(favorable)
PopMatters	8/10 stars
Robert Christgau	(A−)
Sing Out!	(favorable)

Creative Loafing's James Kelly gave the album 4 out of 5 stars and called it "a very fitting and long-overdue tribute." Robert Christgau gave it an A− and wrote that on the album, Morlix and his drummer "sink into a slough of despond that starts feeling right comfy before the record rises up with 'Small Town Hero,' in which the duct tape abuser gets the last word on the high school sports star."

== Track listing ==
1. "Baby Can I Crawl Back to You"
2. "Big Cheeseburgers and Good French Fries"
3. "Clay Pigeons"
4. "If I Could Only Fly"
5. "No Goodwill Stores in Waikiki"
6. "For Anything Less"
7. "Oh Darlin'"
8. "Picture Cards"
9. "Down Here Where I Am"
10. "Oooh Love"
11. "Small Town Hero"
12. "Rainbows and Ridges"
13. "Blaze Foley's 113th Wet Dream"
14. "In the Misty Garden / I Shoulda Been Home with You"
15. "Cold Cold World"
