= Lucinda Williams (album) =

Studio album by Lucinda Williams
- Released: 1988
- Recorded: June 1988
- Studio: Mad Dog Studios in Venice, California
- Genres: Country rock; blues rock; heartland rock
- Length: 38:35
- Label: Rough Trade
- Producers: Gurf Morlix, Dusty Wakeman, Lucinda Williams

Lucinda Williams chronology
Happy Woman Blues (1980)	Lucinda Williams (1988)	Sweet Old World (1992)

Lucinda Williams is the third studio album by American singer-songwriter Lucinda Williams, released in 1988, by Rough Trade Records.

An alternative country and roots rock record about the complexities of romantic relationships, Lucinda Williams was met with widespread critical acclaim upon release and has since been viewed as a leading work in the development of the Americana movement. The album was produced by Williams, with Dusty Wakeman and Gurf Morlix, and features the first appearance of "Passionate Kisses", a song later recorded by Mary Chapin Carpenter for her album Come On Come On (1992), which garnered Williams her first Grammy Award for Best Country Song in 1994.

== Music and lyrics ==
Before Williams was signed by Rough Trade Records, she had struggled shopping her demo of the album: "The L.A. people said, 'It's too country for rock.' The Nashville people said, 'It's too rock for country.'" Rough Trade founder Geoff Travis said of signing Williams in 1987, "We were big fans of the Southern literary tradition. We recognized that Lucinda was writing serious songs, but with the wit and humor of real rock'n'roll."

According to Spin magazine's Keith Harris, Lucinda Williams has since been classified as alternative country, while WFUV's Claudia Marshall called it a roots rock record that fuses country, blues, folk, and rock music. With its synthesis of folk, rock, country blues, and Cajun music, Nigel Williamson of Uncut said it may be seen as one of the earliest records in the alternative country scene. Robert Christgau, writing in The Village Voice, called it a blues record and remarked that Williams plays "joyously uncountrypolitan blues". Greg Kot wrote in the Chicago Tribune, "like the music, which drifts between the lonesome worlds of country and blues, the lyrics can't be pinned down: They speak of the ambivalence that shades love and loss."

== Release and reception ==
Retrospective professional ratings
Aggregate scores
Source	Rating
Metacritic	97/100
Review scores
Source	Rating
AllMusic	4.5/5 stars
American Songwriter	5/5 stars
The Austin Chronicle	5/5 stars
Christgau's Record Guide	A
The Guardian	4/5 stars
Mojo	5/5 stars
Rolling Stone	4/5 stars
The Rolling Stone Album Guide	4.5/5 stars
Spin Alternative Record Guide	10/10
Uncut	9/10

Lucinda Williams was released by Rough Trade in 1988 to rave reviews from critics. It was voted the 16th best album of the year in The Village Voice's annual Pazz & Jop critics poll. In a review for the newspaper, Christgau, giving the album an "A−" grade, called Williams a passionate but grounded songwriter and wrote that, apart from the great "I Just Wanted to See You So Bad" and "Passionate Kisses", the rest of the album is good and relies on "a big not enormous, handsome not beautiful voice that's every bit as strong as the will of this singer-by-nature and writer-by-nurture". He ranked the album sixth-best in his list for the poll. Rolling Stone magazine's Steve Pond gave Lucinda Williams three-and-a-half out of five stars in a contemporary review and felt the unadorned musical approach occasionally exposes some unpleasant lyrics and hesitant singing, but it also makes Williams sound like an honest narrator to listeners as she avoids clichés and evasive language in her songwriting. Rating the album seven out of ten in NME, Stuart Bailie deemed it an "encouraging" work whose "bluesy and countrified" material shows that Williams is skilled at interpreting traditional musical styles with "a bright, often contemporary swing". After the mainstream success of Williams' fifth album Car Wheels on a Gravel Road, Lucinda Williams was reissued with bonus tracks in 1998, and by January 2000, it had sold 100,000 copies in the United States.

According to AllMusic's Vik Iyengar, Lucinda Williams has been "recognized as a classic" since it was first released. Iyengar saw Williams as a meticulous composer whose voice and tough perspective work well with her music's mix of country, blues, folk, and rock styles on the album: "In addition to writing strong melodies, Williams is an amazing songwriter with a knack for writing a lyric that acknowledges the complicated nature of relationships while cutting right to the heart of the matter." In The Rolling Stone Album Guide (2004), David McGee and Milo Miles said she had progressed astonishingly over her previous work, transitioned confidently into rock music, and made her songs more interesting with darker lyrics: "There's not a false step, and the depth of feeling is powerful." In 2005, Spin ranked Lucinda Williams at No. 39 on its list of the 100 greatest albums from 1985 to 2005. Upon the album's 25th anniversary rerelease in 2014, Will Hermes of Rolling Stone credited it for being at the forefront of the Americana movement, and Robin Denselow called it "an Americana classic" in The Guardian, while Stephen M. Deusner wrote for CMT that it is "a roots-rock landmark, ground zero for today's burgeoning Americana movement". Lucinda Williams was ranked No. 426 in Rolling Stone's 2020 edition of its "500 Greatest Albums of All Time" list.

== Track listing ==
All tracks written by Lucinda Williams, except where noted.

No.	Title	Writer(s)	Length
1.	"I Just Wanted to See You So Bad"		2:25
2.	"The Night's Too Long"		4:15
3.	"Abandoned"		3:45
4.	"Big Red Sun Blues"		3:27
5.	"Like a Rose"		2:37
6.	"Changed the Locks"		3:39
7.	"Passionate Kisses"		2:35
8.	"Am I Too Blue"		2:55
9.	"Crescent City"		3:01
10.	"Side of the Road"		3:27
11.	"Price to Pay"		2:46
12.	"I Asked for Water (He Gave Me Gasoline)"	Chester Burnett	3:43
Total length:			38:35

Additional live bonus tracks on 1998 reissue
No.	Title	Writer(s)	Length
13.	"Nothing in Rambling (Live at KPFK)"	Memphis Minnie	3:14
14.	"Disgusted (Live at KPFK)"	Lil' Son Jackson	3:09
15.	"Side of the Road (Live at KPFK)"		3:54
16.	"Goin’ Back Home (Live at NOISE)"	Traditional	3:22
17.	"Something About What Happens When We Talk (Live at KCRW)"		3:21
18.	"Sundays (Live at KCRW)"		3:23
Total length:			58:58

=== 25th anniversary re-issue ===
On January 14, 2014, the album was re-issued on Lucinda Williams' own label. It includes the original 12-track album, and a bonus disc featuring a live concert from the Netherlands, recorded on May 19, 1989, and six additional live tracks that also appeared on the 1998 reissue. All songs written by Lucinda Williams, unless noted otherwise.

Live at Effenaar, Eindhoven, Netherlands, May 19, 1989

No.	Title	Writer(s)	Length
1.	"I Just Wanted to See You So Bad"		2:33
2.	"Big Red Sun Blues"		3:31
3.	"Am I Too Blue"		3:16
4.	"Crescent City"		3:36
5.	"The Night's Too Long"		4:38
6.	"Something About What Happens When We Talk"		4:14
7.	"Factory Blues"		2:59
8.	"Happy Woman Blues"		3:46
9.	"Abandoned"		4:11
10.	"Wild and Blue"	John Scott Sherrill	3:21
11.	"Passionate Kisses"		2:32
12.	"Changed the Locks"		4:28
13.	"Nothing in Rambling"	Kansas Joe McCoy	4:45
14.	"Sundays"		3:34

Additional live bonus tracks (originally appeared on 1998 reissue)
No.	Title	Writer(s)	Length
15.	"Nothing in Rambling (Live at KPFK)"	Memphis Minnie	3:14
16.	"Disgusted (Live at KPFK)"	Lil' Son Jackson	3:09
17.	"Side of the Road (Live at KPFK)"		3:54
18.	"Goin’ Back Home (Live at NOISE)"	Traditional	3:22
19.	"Something About What Happens When We Talk (Live at KCRW)"		3:21
20.	"Sundays (Live at KCRW)"		3:23

== Personnel ==
- Lucinda Williams – lead vocals, acoustic guitar
- Gurf Morlix – vocals, electric 6- and 12-string guitars, acoustic guitar, mandolin, Dobro, pedal steel, lap steel, 6-string bass
- Dr. Johnny Ciambotti – Fender three-string bass, stand-up bass, Kramer-Ferrington bass
- Donald Lindley – drums

Additional musicians

- Skip Edwards – keyboards
- John "Juke" Logan – harmonica
- Doug Atwell – fiddle
- Steve Mugalian – washboard
- Chris Gaffney – accordion
- Jim Lauderdale – backing vocals
- Pat Quinn – backing vocals

Technical

- Joanna Spock Dean - executive producer
- Joanna Spock Dean, Lucinda Williams - artwork concept
- Greg Allen - photography

== Charts ==
Chart performance for Lucinda Williams
Chart (1989)	Peak position
Australian Albums (ARIA)	117
New Zealand Albums (RMNZ)	49
Chart (2014)^{A}	Peak position
US Billboard 200	39
US Catalog Albums (Billboard)	1
US Tastemakers (Billboard)	4

- ^{A} Did not chart in US when first released in 1988. Chart performance when reissued in 2014.
