= Sweet Old World =

Studio album by Lucinda Williams
- Released: August 25, 1992
- Genre: Roots rock
- Length: 45:27
- Label: Chameleon
- Producer: Gurf Morlix, Dusty Wakeman, Lucinda Williams

Lucinda Williams chronology
Lucinda Williams (1988)	Sweet Old World (1992)	Car Wheels on a Gravel Road (1998)

Sweet Old World is the fourth studio album by American singer-songwriter Lucinda Williams, released on August 25, 1992, by Chameleon Records.

A roots rock album, Sweet Old World was met with widespread critical acclaim upon release, and remains one of Williams' best reviewed works. She produced the album with Dusty Wakeman and Gurf Morlix, the three of them having previously produced its predecessor, her self-titled effort (1988). Emmylou Harris covered the title track on her album Wrecking Ball (1995).

On April 28, 2017, Williams performed the album in its entirety at Minneapolis' First Avenue nightclub; the live recording was released to commemorate Sweet Old World's 25th anniversary in August. She re-recorded the album more to her liking and released it later that year as This Sweet Old World, which earned further critical acclaim.

== Critical reception ==
Professional ratings
Review scores
Source	Rating
AllMusic	4.5/5 stars
Christgau's Consumer Guide	A
Entertainment Weekly	B+
Q	4/5 stars
Rolling Stone	3.5/5 stars
The Rolling Stone Album Guide	4/5 stars
Spin Alternative Record Guide	8/10

Sweet Old World was voted the 11th best album of 1992 in The Village Voice's Pazz & Jop, an annual poll of prominent music critics. Robert Christgau, the poll's creator, ranked it 6th on his own year-end list, later writing that the album was "gorgeous, flawless, brilliant [with] short-story details ('chess pieces,' 'dresses that zip up the side') packing a textural thrill akin to local color". In a contemporary review, Audio magazine said Sweet Old World proves Williams is "a riveting writer and performer whose apparent simplicity is merely the entranceway to a rewarding artist of depth", while Stereo Review wrote "She delivers her searing lines without artificial sentiment or extraneous embellishment, just a wrenching directness that nourishes the spirit and knows no detour to the heart."

In a retrospective review for The Rolling Stone Album Guide (2004), David McGee and Milo Miles later wrote Williams was a "damned determined artist" on Sweet Old World, in which the perspectives of her previous work--"adult, Southern, female, sensual but neurotic"—were stronger and more focused. AllMusic's Steve Huey said it was just as good as her 1988 self-titled album, calling it "a gorgeous, elegiac record that not only consolidates but expands Williams' ample talents." Like her self-titled album, Bill Friskics-Warren wrote in The Washington Post, Sweet Old World showcased Williams' "sharply drawn odes to desire and loss", sung with a "grainy drawl" and backed against a "lean, bluesy roots-rock" sound.

== Track listing ==
All tracks written by Lucinda Williams, except where noted.

No.	Title	Writer(s)	Length
1.	"Six Blocks Away"		2:52
2.	"Something About What Happens When We Talk"		3:50
3.	"He Never Got Enough Love"	Lucinda Williams; Betty Elders	3:52
4.	"Sweet Old World"		4:03
5.	"Little Angel, Little Brother"		4:25
6.	"Pineola"		4:10
7.	"Lines Around Your Eyes"		2:29
8.	"Prove My Love"		2:48
9.	"Sidewalks of the City"		3:46
10.	"Memphis Pearl"	Williams; Lorne Rall	3:48
11.	"Hot Blood"		5:27
12.	"Which Will"	Nick Drake	3:49
Total length:			45:27

== Personnel ==
- Lucinda Williams – lead vocals, acoustic guitar
- Gurf Morlix – electric and acoustic guitar, pedal steel, dobro, mandolin, lap steel, beer bottle and background vocals
- Duane Jarvis – electric guitar
- John Ciambotti – electric and upright bass
- Donald Lindley – drums and percussion
- Doug Atwell – fiddle
- Byron Berline – fiddle & mandolin
- Skip Edwards – Hammond B-3 organ
- Benmont Tench – Hammond B-3 organ
- William "Smitty" Smith – Hammond B-3 organ
- Gia Ciambotti, Jim Lauderdale, Dusty Wakeman – background vocals

== Charts ==
Chart performance for Sweet Old World
Chart (1992)	Peak position
Australian Albums (ARIA)	134
US Heatseekers (Billboard)	25
