= Blessed (Lucinda Williams album) =

Studio album by Lucinda Williams
- Released: March 1, 2011
- Studio: Capitol (Hollywood, California)
- Genre: Americana, folk rock, alternative country, heartland rock
- Length: 59:05
- Label: Lost Highway
- Producer: Don Was, Eric Liljestrand, Tom Overby

Lucinda Williams chronology
Little Honey (2008)	Blessed (2011)	Down Where the Spirit Meets the Bone (2014)

Blessed is the 10th studio album by American singer-songwriter Lucinda Williams, released on March 1, 2011, by Lost Highway Records. The album debuted at No. 15 on the Billboard 200.

A critical and commercial success, the album earned Williams a nomination for the Grammy Award for Best Americana Album in 2012. The track "Kiss Like Your Kiss" was written for the HBO series True Blood, and originally appeared on its soundtrack album released in 2010. The song earned Williams a nomination for the Grammy Award for Best Song Written for a Motion Picture, Television or Other Visual Media in 2011.

== Music and lyrics ==
The album features guest appearances by Elvis Costello and Matthew Sweet. "Buttercup" was released to radio and digital outlets as the first single.

== Critical reception ==
Professional ratings
Aggregate scores
Source	Rating
AnyDecentMusic?	7.4/10
Metacritic	79/100
Review scores
Source	Rating
AllMusic	4/5 stars
Los Angeles Times	4/4 stars
Robert Christgau	B+
Spin	7/10 stars

Blessed was met with widespread critical acclaim. At Metacritic, which assigns a weighted average rating out of 100 to reviews from mainstream publications, the album received an average score of 79, based on 24 reviews. AllMusic rated the album 4 out of 5 stars, writing "Blessed is Williams' most focused recording since World Without Tears; it stands with it and her 1988 self-titled Rough Trade as one of her finest recordings to date. Its shift in lyric focus is amplified by the care and detail in the album's production and crackling energy. By deliberately shifting to a harder-edged roots rock sonic palette, Blessed moves Williams music down the road from the dead-end Americana ghetto without compromising her qualities as a songwriter or performer". An enthusiast review from the Los Angeles Times called it "one of the best albums she’s ever released", stating "the dozen songs on the album tackle complicated emotions with a deft touch to create profoundly moving moments. Williams' writing on Blessed is seamless. The songwriter mixes it up with electric guitar songs, personalized protest songs, and touching, gorgeous ballads. Combined, the result is a dynamic, human album, one that’s easy to fall in love with."

The Village Voice critic Robert Christgau rated the album B+, writing "Williams has always worked her drawl, but here the extended vowels and slurred consonants tempt one to suspect she's afraid 'We were blessed by the watchmaker/Who gave up his time' won't stand up straight next to 'We were blessed by the wounded man/Who felt no pain.' Unfortunately, it won't, and similar shortfalls cripple 'Soldier Song' just before. What makes me half believe I'll want to hear this album again is the drawn-out religious rumination 'Awakening', where vagueness signifies, and every solo Val McCallum gets. Atmospheric. Play loud anyway, so it won't be."

== Awards ==
Award nominations for Blessed
Year	Award	Category	Nominated work	Result	Ref.
2012	Grammy Awards	Best Americana Album	Blessed	Nominated	

== Track listing ==
All tracks written by Lucinda Williams.

No.	Title	Length
1.	"Buttercup"	3:50
2.	"I Don't Know How You're Livin'"	5:00
3.	"Copenhagen"	4:30
4.	"Born to Be Loved"	4:38
5.	"Seeing Black"	5:14
6.	"Soldier's Song"	6:09
7.	"Blessed"	5:48
8.	"Sweet Love"	3:33
9.	"Ugly Truth"	4:22
10.	"Convince Me"	5:45
11.	"Awakening"	6:25
12.	"Kiss Like Your Kiss"	3:51
Total length:		59:05

=== Blessed deluxe edition ===
Disc 2: The Kitchen Tapes
No.	Title	Length
1.	"Buttercup"	4:01
2.	"I Don't Know How You're Livin'"	5:12
3.	"Copenhagen"	3:27
4.	"Born To Be Loved"	3:06
5.	"Seeing Black"	3:44
6.	"Soldier's Song"	5:37
7.	"Blessed"	3:23
8.	"Sweet Love"	2:30
9.	"Ugly Truth"	4:07
10.	"Convince Me"	3:49
11.	"Awakening"	3:40
12.	"Kiss Like Your Kiss"	2:32
Total length:		45:08

== Personnel ==
- Lucinda Williams – acoustic guitar, lead vocals, background vocals
- Nathan Barr – cello
- Elvis Costello – electric guitar
- Rami Jaffee – accordion, Hammond organ, piano
- Greg Leisz – 12-string guitar, electric guitar, pedal steel guitar
- Val McCallum – electric guitar, national steel guitar, slide guitar
- Butch Norton – drums, percussion
- David Sutton – bass guitar, upright bass
- Matthew Sweet – background vocals

== Charts ==
Chart performance for Blessed
Chart (2011)	Peak position
Australian Albums (ARIA)	63
Dutch Albums (Album Top 100)	40
Irish Albums (IRMA)	69
New Zealand Albums (RMNZ)	18
Norwegian Albums (VG-lista)	20
Spanish Albums (Promusicae)	75
Swedish Albums (Sverigetopplistan)	15
UK Albums (OCC)	55
US Billboard 200	15
US Rock Albums (Billboard)	4
