= This Sweet Old World =

Studio album by Lucinda Williams
- Released: September 29, 2017
- Recorded: 2017
- Studio: Dave's Room, North Hollywood, California, United States
- Genre: Country; folk
- Length: 70:59
- Language: English
- Label: Highway 20; Thirty Tigers
- Producer: Tom Overby; Lucinda Williams

Lucinda Williams chronology
The Ghosts of Highway 20 (2016)	This Sweet Old World (2017)	Vanished Gardens (2018)

This Sweet Old World is the 13th studio album by American singer-songwriter Lucinda Williams, released on September 29, 2017, by Highway 20 Records and Thirty Tigers. A re-recording of her 1992 album Sweet Old World, Williams was motivated to revisit the older material by her husband and manager Tom Overby, who co-produced the album with her. The album has received critical acclaim.

== Critical reception ==
Professional ratings
Aggregate scores
Source	Rating
Metacritic	86/100
Review scores
Source	Rating
AllMusic	3.5/5 stars
The Independent	5/5
PopMatters	9/10 stars

According to the review aggregator Metacritic, This Sweet Old World received "universal acclaim" based on a weighted average score of 86 out of 100 from five critic scores. Mark Deming of AllMusic Guide gave the album a positive assessment, with the editorial staff ranking it 3.5 out of five stars. Deming calls this release "a genuine improvement" over the famously fraught 1992 album, with his only complaint being the wearing on Williams' voice due to age. Writing for Exclaim!, Mark Dunn gave the album seven out of 10, agreeing that Williams' voice has changed dramatically in the ensuing 25 years but noting that she uses it as an instrument masterfully, pairing it with stripped-down country arrangements, compared to the more pop feel of the 1992 release. George de Stefano of PopMatters gave the release nine out of 10, calling it a "surprising and bold move" and writes that both the re-recordings and the new tracks are "gems". In The San Francisco Chronicle, Joshua Zucker calls the album a document of Williams' musical evolution, with a mix of live energy, emotional lyrics, and rocking sound. In The Independent, Andy Gill recommended several tracks for download and gave the album five out of five stars, summing up: Her voice, meanwhile, has grown into these songs splendidly: it’s amazing how much brazen sensuality she can bring to an image like “Saw you in the laundromat, washing your clothes/Getting all the dirt out”.

== Chart performance ==
On October 21, 2017, This Sweet Old World reached No. 21 on Billboard's Internet Albums chart, No. 57 on the Top Current Albums, No. 6 on Americana/Folk Albums Sales, No. 17 on Rock Album Sales, No. 14 on Independent Albums, and No. 22 on Tastemakers. For the comprehensive Total Album Sales, it topped out at No. 65. The album peaked for one week at No. 101 in the Netherlands.

== Track listing ==
All tracks written by Lucinda Williams, except where noted.

No.	Title	Writer(s)	Length
1.	"Six Blocks Away"		4:13
2.	"Prove My Love"		4:53
3.	"Something About What Happens When We Talk"		4:44
4.	"Memphis Pearl"	Lucinda Williams; Lorne Rall	4:19
5.	"Sidewalks of the City"		5:23
6.	"Sweet Old World"		4:45
7.	"Little Angel, Little Brother"		4:42
8.	"Pineola"		4:18
9.	"Lines Around Your Eyes"		2:45
10.	"Drivin' Down a Dead End Street"	Williams; Betty Elders	6:06
11.	"Hot Blood"		6:19
12.	"Which Will"	Nick Drake	4:31
13.	"Factory Blues"	Traditional	3:36
14.	"What You Don't Know"	James Lauderdale; John Leventhal	3:52
15.	"Wild and Blue"	John Scott Sherrill	3:31
16.	"Dark Side of Life"		3:02
Total length:			70:59

== Personnel ==
- Lucinda Williams – vocals, guitar, production

Additional musicians

- David Bianco – organ, recording, engineering, mixing
- Greg Leisz – guitar, lap steel guitar
- Stuart Mathis – guitar
- Butch Norton – drums, percussion, backing vocals
- David Sutton – bass guitar, backing vocals

Technical personnel

- Fetzer Design – design
- Brian Lucey – mastering
- David McClister – photography
- Tom Overby – production
- David Spreng – engineering

== Charts ==
Chart performance for This Sweet Old World
Chart (2017)	Peak position
Dutch Albums (Album Top 100)	101
US Folk Albums (Billboard)	6
US Independent Albums (Billboard)	14
US Rock Albums (Billboard)	17
US Tastemakers (Billboard)	22
