= West (Lucinda Williams album) =

Studio album by Lucinda Williams
- Released: February 13, 2007
- Recorded: The Village
- Length: 68:40
- Label: Lost Highway
- Producers: Hal Willner, Lucinda Williams

Lucinda Williams chronology
Live @ The Fillmore (2005)	West (2007)	Little Honey (2008)

West is the eighth studio album by American singer-songwriter Lucinda Williams, released on February 13, 2007, by Lost Highway Records. The album debuted at No. 14 on the Billboard 200, selling about 57,000 copies that week. According to Nielsen SoundScan, the album had sold 250,000 copies in the United States by October 2008.

The track "Are You Alright?" was featured during the closing scenes of an episode of House ("Fetal Position"), which first aired April 3, 2007. It also appeared in the fourth episode of the HBO series True Detective, which first aired February 9, 2014. The track "Rescue" was featured on a season one episode of Brothers and Sisters (episode 18, first aired April 8, 2007).

The track "Come On" earned Williams two Grammy Award nominations in 2008: Best Solo Rock Vocal Performance and Best Rock Song. Both awards went to Bruce Springsteen for "Radio Nowhere".

The track "Unsuffer Me" was featured during the closing credits of the 2022 film All the Beauty and the Bloodshed.

== Critical reception ==
Professional ratings
Aggregate scores
Source	Rating
Metacritic	69/100
Review scores
Source	Rating
AllMusic	4/5 stars
Being There Magazine	4.5/5 stars
Music Box	4/5 stars
Okayplayer	4/5 stars
Pitchfork	3.5/10
Q	4/5 stars
Robert Christgau	A
Rolling Stone	4/5 stars
Twisted Ear	3.5/5 stars

West was met with positive reception. At Metacritic, which assigns a weighted average rating out of 100 to reviews from mainstream publications, the album received an average score of 69, based on 28 reviews. AllMusic remarked "Williams is nothing if not a purely confessional songwriter. She continually walks in the shadowlands to bring out what is both most personal yet universal in her work, to communicate to listeners directly and without compromise", and concluded that the album "will no doubt attract more than a few new fans, and will give old ones, if they are open enough, a recording to relish".

The Village Voice critic Robert Christgau said Williams "affects authenticity as shamelessly as her role model, Bob Dylan, but with respect to all the other noble old pros deploying blues and country readymades, the craftiness of Williams' vocals, meaning their unnaturalness, secures their vitality. She doesn't fake spontaneity--she honors it as one of the constellation of life virtues she hopes her songs evoke and subsume." Rolling Stone ranked the album at No. 18 on their list of the Top 50 Albums of 2007, while the track "Are You Alright?" was ranked at No. 34 on their list of the 100 Best Songs of 2007.

== Awards ==
Award nominations for West
Year	Award	Category	Nominated work	Result	Ref.
2008	Grammy Awards	Best Solo Rock Vocal Performance	"Come On"	Nominated	
2008	Grammy Awards	Best Rock Song	"Come On"	Nominated	

== Track listing ==
All songs written by Lucinda Williams.

No.	Title	Length
1.	"Are You Alright?"	5:18
2.	"Mama You Sweet"	4:45
3.	"Learning How to Live"	5:12
4.	"Fancy Funeral"	4:15
5.	"Unsuffer Me"	5:40
6.	"Everything Has Changed"	3:38
7.	"Come On"	4:53
8.	"Where Is My Love?"	5:23
9.	"Rescue"	5:35
10.	"What If"	5:41
11.	"Wrap My Head Around That"	9:07
12.	"Words"	3:33
13.	"West"	5:40
Total length:		68:40

Bonus tracks

- "Words" (alternate version) – 3:57 (iTunes United States)
- "Where Is My Love?" (demo version) – 5:28 (Best Buy)
- "Rescue" (demo version) – 5:37 (Best Buy)
- "Unsuffer Me" (demo version) – 6:27 (indie retailer's bonus disc)
- "Everything Has Changed" (demo version) – 3:49 (indie retailer's bonus disc)
- "Learning How to Live" (demo version) (Japanese edition)
- "What If" (demo version) (Japanese edition)

== Personnel ==
- Lucinda Williams – lead vocals, acoustic guitar
- Rob Burger – piano, organ, accordion
- Doug Pettibone – acoustic, electric, baritone guitar
- Bill Frisell – acoustic, electric guitar
- Tony Garnier – electric bass, double bass
- Jim Keltner – drums, percussion
- Jenny Scheinman – violins
- Rob Brophy – viola
- Tim Loo – cello
- Hal Willner – turntable, samples
- Gary Louris, Gia Ciambotti – background vocals

== Charts ==
Chart performance for West
Chart (2007)	Peak position
Australian Albums (ARIA)	53
Belgian Albums (Ultratop Flanders)	60
Dutch Albums (Album Top 100)	29
German Albums (Offizielle Top 100)	95
Irish Albums (IRMA)	60
Italian Albums (FIMI)	52
New Zealand Albums (RMNZ)	33
Swedish Albums (Sverigetopplistan)	10
UK Albums (OCC)	30
US Billboard 200	14
US Rock Albums (Billboard)	5
