= The Ghosts of Highway 20 =

Studio album by Lucinda Williams
- Released: February 5, 2016
- Recorded: 2015
- Genre: Country
- Length: 86:09
- Label: Highway 20 Records
- Producers: Greg Leisz, Tom Overby, Lucinda Williams

Lucinda Williams chronology
Down Where the Spirit Meets the Bone (2014)	The Ghosts of Highway 20 (2016)	This Sweet Old World (2017)

The Ghosts of Highway 20 is the 12th studio album by American singer-songwriter Lucinda Williams. The double album was released on February 5, 2016, by Highway 20 Records. It was nominated for the Americana Music Award for Album of the Year.

"Bitter Memory" was performed by Connie Britton (as her character Rayna Jaymes) and Brad Paisley on the TV series Nashville. Britton's solo version appears on The Music of Nashville: Season 1, Volume 2.

== Critical reception ==
Professional ratings
Aggregate scores
Source	Rating
AnyDecentMusic?	8.0/10
Metacritic	83/100
Review scores
Source	Rating
AllMusic	4/5 stars
Consequence of Sound	B
Drowned In Sound	7/10
The Guardian	4/5 stars
Paste	9.3/10
PopMatters	9/10 stars
Pitchfork	8.0/10
Rolling Stone	4/5 stars
Slant Magazine	4.5/5 stars
Spin	8/10

The album received acclaim from music critics. At Metacritic, which assigns a normalized rating out of 100 to reviews from mainstream critics, the album received an average score of 83 based on 19 reviews, which indicates "universal acclaim". AllMusic wrote "after releasing one of the best and boldest albums of her career with Down Where the Spirit Meets the Bone, Williams goes from strength to strength with The Ghosts of Highway 20, and it seems like a welcome surprise that she's moving into one of the most fruitful periods of her recording career as she approaches her fourth decade as a musician. Will Hermes writing in Rolling Stone commends the album's "languorous tempos". Hermes notes the recent passing of the singer's father, poet Miller Williams, as casting "mortality's shadow" across several songs on the album.

== Chart performance ==
The album debuted on the Billboard 200 at No. 36 on its release. It also debuted at No. 1 on the Folk Albums and Independent Albums charts, and No. 3 on the Top Rock Albums chart.

== Track listing ==
All songs written by Lucinda Williams, except where noted.

Disc one
No.	Title	Writer(s)	Length
1.	"Dust"	Miller Williams, music and additional words by Lucinda Williams	6:19
2.	"House of Earth"	Woody Guthrie	5:28
3.	"I Know All About It"		5:46
4.	"Place in My Heart"		5:13
5.	"Death Came"		6:14
6.	"Doors of Heaven"		5:33
7.	"Louisiana Story"		9:05
Total length:			43:41

Disc two
No.	Title	Writer(s)	Length
1.	"Ghosts of Highway 20"		7:20
2.	"Bitter Memory"		4:07
3.	"Factory"	Bruce Springsteen	4:01
4.	"Can't Close the Door on Love"		5:36
5.	"If My Love Could Kill"		5:09
6.	"If There's a Heaven"		3:34
7.	"Faith & Grace"	Traditional	12:44
Total length:			42:32

== Personnel ==
- Carlton "Santa" Davis - drums
- Bill Frisell - electric guitar
- Greg Leisz - acoustic guitar, electric guitar
- Val McCallum - electric guitar
- Butch Norton - drums, percussion, background vocals
- Ras Michael - hand drums, background vocals
- David Sutton - bass guitar, background vocals
- Lucinda Williams - acoustic guitar, electric guitar, lead vocals, background vocals

== Charts ==
Chart performance for The Ghosts of Highway 20
Chart (2016)	Peak position
Australian Albums (ARIA)	20
Austrian Albums (Ö3 Austria)	40
Belgian Albums (Ultratop Flanders)	25
Belgian Albums (Ultratop Wallonia)	104
Canadian Albums (Billboard)	53
Dutch Albums (Album Top 100)	21
German Albums (Offizielle Top 100)	29
Irish Albums (IRMA)	49
Italian Albums (FIMI)	88
New Zealand Albums (RMNZ)	17
Scottish Albums (Official Charts)	21
Spanish Albums (Promusicae)	83
Swedish Albums (Sverigetopplistan)	28
Swiss Albums (Schweizer Hitparade)	43
UK Albums (Official Charts)	33
UK Americana Albums (Official Charts)	2
UK Country Albums (Official Charts)	1
UK Independent Albums (Official Charts)	5
US Billboard 200	36
US Americana/Folk Albums (Billboard)	1
US Independent Albums (Billboard)	1
US Top Rock Albums (Billboard)	3
