= Ramblin' on My Mind (Lucinda Williams album) =

Studio album by Lucinda Williams
- Released: 1979
- Studio: Malaco Studios, Jackson, Mississippi
- Genre: Country; blues
- Length: 43:17
- Label: Folkways
- Producer: Tom Royals

Lucinda Williams chronology
| Ramblin' on My Mind (1979) | Happy Woman Blues (1980) |

Alternative cover
- 1991 reissue album cover

Ramblin' on My Mind is the debut studio album by American singer-songwriter Lucinda Williams, released in 1979, by Folkways Records.

Produced by Tom Royals, and recorded in Mississippi in September 1978, the album features a collection of traditional folk and country standards arranged and performed by Williams, with accompaniment by John Grimaudo on his six-string guitar. When the album was re-issued on CD in 1991 by Smithsonian Folkways, the title was shortened to Ramblin' and featured an alternate album cover.

== Background and reception ==
Professional ratings
Review scores
| Source | Rating |
|---|---|
| AllMusic | 2/5 stars |
| The Rolling Stone Album Guide | 2/5 stars |

Smithsonian Folkways says her "Southern blues roots are unmistakable on her debut record [...] showcasing the artistry that would make her an icon."

Trouser Press called it "a warm, lively album of covers" that "shows off Williams’ affecting vocals and her roots — from the bayou to the church choir to the Opry".

== Track listing ==
Credits adapted from the album's liner notes.

Side one
| No. | Title | Writer(s) | Length |
|---|---|---|---|
| 1. | "Ramblin' on My Mind" | Robert Johnson | 2:30 |
| 2. | "Me and My Chauffeur" | Clifton Chenier; Memphis Minnie | 3:12 |
| 3. | "Motherless Children" | Traditional | 3:31 |
| 4. | "Malted Milk Blues" | Robert Johnson | 2:29 |
| 5. | "Disgusted" | Melvin Jackson | 2:28 |
| 6. | "Jug Band Music" | Memphis Jug Band | 2:22 |
| 7. | "Stop Breakin' Down" | Robert Johnson | 3:20 |

Side two
| No. | Title | Writer(s) | Length |
|---|---|---|---|
| 1. | "Drop Down Daddy" | Sleepy John Estes; Hammie Nixon (originally "Drop Down Mama") | 3:23 |
| 2. | "Little Darling Pal of Mine" | A.P. Carter | 2:59 |
| 3. | "Make Me Down a Pallet on Your Floor" | Traditional | 3:50 |
| 4. | "Jambalaya (On the Bayou)" | Hank Williams | 3:05 |
| 5. | "Great Speckled Bird" | Roy Acuff; A.P. Carter; Reverend Guy Smith; Traditional | 2:55 |
| 6. | "You're Gonna Need That Pure Religion" | Traditional | 2:55 |
| 7. | "Satisfied Mind" | Joe Hayes; Jack Rhodes | 4:06 |
| Total length: | | | 43:17 |

== Personnel ==
- Lucinda Williams – vocals, 12-string guitar
- John Grimaudo – 6-string acoustic guitar

Technical

- Gerald "Wolf" Stephenson - engineer
- Carol Hardy – cover
