= Right in Time =

1998 single by Lucinda Williams

- promotional CD single artwork

Single by Lucinda Williams

from the album Car Wheels on a Gravel Road
- Released: 1998
- Genre: Country rock; alternative country; power pop
- Length: 4:35
- Label: Mercury
- Songwriter(s): Lucinda Williams
- Producer(s): Steve Earle, Ray Kennedy, Lucinda Williams

Lucinda Williams singles chronology
"Something About What Happens When We Talk" (1993)	"Right in Time" (1998)	"Can't Let Go" (1998)

"Right in Time" is a song written and performed by American singer-songwriter Lucinda Williams. It was released in 1998 as the first single from her fifth album, Car Wheels on a Gravel Road (1998).

The song was featured on the season one soundtrack album to the Showtime series The L Word. Sarah McLachlan selected the track for inclusion on her Artist's Choice compilation album in 2004.

== Content ==
A review of the song from AllMusic stated: "Few artists could conjure a sense of yearning for an absent lover the way Lucinda Williams does in 'Right in Time', making physical the painful nature of unsatisfied and overwhelming longing, [the song] moves to a feeling of immediacy as the chorus enters, shifting the tone from longing, twangy guitars propelling the chorus--'The way you move, it's right in time/It's right in time with me.' The song then segues into the more intimate setting of Lucinda's private world, where time slows down to a stagger, 'I take off my watch and my earrings/My bracelets and everything/Lie on my back and moan at the ceiling...Think about you and that long ride/I bite my nails, I get weak inside/Reach over and turn off the light/Oh my baby' drawn out in such a low, aching moan that the return of the guitars and closing chorus is a palpable release.

== Reception ==
LA Weekly ranked "Right in Time" at No. 8 on their list of Williams' best 11 songs, while music website Return of Rock ranked it No. 3 on their list. Pitchfork wrote that the song includes some of her "most irreducible, eloquent poetry—'Not a day goes by I don’t think about you/You left your mark on me, it’s permanent, a tattoo'—before becoming a moaned narrative of a woman alone in bed, pleasuring herself. It is unbelievably sensual, a daydream." NME observed that the song is "rich in meaning, pulsing with the thrill of love remembered, and hurting with the chill of absence."

In a five-star-out-of-five review of Car Wheels on a Gravel Road for Rolling Stone, Robert Christgau observed "from the album's very first lines-in which the flat 'Not a day goes by I don't think about you' sets up the ambush of 'You left your mark on me, it's permanent [pause, we need a rhyme fast] a tattoo [gotcha!]', which is instantly trumped by 'Pierce the skin, the blood runs through' and then swoons into a forlorn, unutterably simple 'Oh my baby'-Williams's every picked-over word and effect has something to say.

== Track listing ==
CD single - US

- Album Version - 4:35

CD single - UK

- Album Version - 4:35

CD single - Europe

- Album Version - 4:35
