= Good Souls Better Angels =

Studio album by Lucinda Williams
- Released: April 24, 2020
- Recorded: September–November 2019
- Studios: Room and Board Studio, Nashville, Tennessee
- Genres: Americana, heartland rock
- Length: 59:49
- Language: English
- Labels: Highway 20; Thirty Tigers
- Producers: Ray Kennedy; Tom Overby; Lucinda Williams

Lucinda Williams chronology
Vanished Gardens (2018)	Good Souls Better Angels (2020)	Stories from a Rock n Roll Heart (2023)

Good Souls Better Angels is the 14th studio album by American singer-songwriter Lucinda Williams, released on April 24, 2020, by Highway 20 Records and Thirty Tigers.

Announced in February 2020, the album was preceded by the track "Man Without a Soul", a critique of Donald Trump, which earned Williams a Grammy Award nomination for Best American Roots Song. The album received widespread critical acclaim, and was nominated for the Grammy Award for Best Americana Album.

== Critical reception ==
Professional ratings
Aggregate scores
Source	Rating
AnyDecentMusic?	8.1/10
Metacritic	84/100
Review scores
Source	Rating
AllMusic	3/5 stars
American Songwriter	4.5/5 stars
Exclaim!	8/10
The Irish Times	5/5 stars
Mojo	4/5 stars
Pitchfork	8.0/10
Q	5/5 stars
Uncut	4/5 stars
Rolling Stone	4/5 stars
Tom Hull	A−

According to the review aggregator Metacritic, Good Souls Better Angels received "universal acclaim" based on a weighted average score of 84 out of 100 from 17 critic scores. AnyDecentMusic? sums up critical consensus as an 8.1 out of 10, with 19 reviews. Joe Breen of The Irish Times gave the release five out of five stars, writing that it "punch[es] with a dark, almost biblical vengeance but also, importantly, balance vitriol with solace, hellfire with a hand in need" and praising its timely lyrics. In American Songwriter, Hal Horowitz gave the release 4.5 out of five stars, writing that it is arguably her most intense album, ending his review: "By the end of the hour, you'll be wiped out. This is a devastatingly in your face, take no prisoners presentation from Williams and her band that will leave most serious listeners shattered and perhaps shaking. Few albums connect with this much pure emotional fury, let alone those from artists well into their 60s." Dan Nailen of Inlander writes that this album has Williams' most direct lyrics but suffers from several songs having the same tempo.

Accolades for Good Souls Better Angels
Publication	Accolade	Rank	Ref.
Mojo	Top 75 Albums of 2020	38	
Paste	Paste's 25 Best Albums of 2020 – Mid-Year	14	
Pitchfork	The 35 Best Rock Albums of 2020	*	
Rolling Stone	Best Albums of 2020	47	
Star Tribune	Bream's 10 Best Albums	7	

Award nominations for Good Souls Better Angels
Year	Award	Nominated work	Category	Result	Ref.
2021	Grammy Awards	Good Souls Better Angels	Best Americana Album	Nominated	
2021	Grammy Awards	"Man Without a Soul"	Best American Roots Song	Nominated	

== Track listing ==
All songs written by Tom Overby and Lucinda Williams, except where noted.

No.	Title	Writer(s)	Length
1.	"You Can't Rule Me"	Memphis Minnie (adaptation from the original composition)	4:02
2.	"Bad News Blues"		4:37
3.	"Man Without a Soul"		5:31
4.	"Big Black Train"		5:28
5.	"Wakin' Up"	Williams	4:44
6.	"Pray the Devil Back to Hell"		5:38
7.	"Shadows & Doubts"		6:01
8.	"When the Way Gets Dark"		3:27
9.	"Bone of Contention"	Williams	4:05
10.	"Down Past the Bottom"	Greg Garing	3:21
11.	"Big Rotator"		5:20
12.	"Good Souls"		7:35
Total length:			59:49

== Personnel ==
- Lucinda Williams – acoustic and electric guitar, vocals, production
- Mark T. Jordan – organ on "Big Black Train" and "Shadows & Doubts"
- Ray Kennedy – mixing, production
- Brian Lucey – mastering
- Stuart Mathis – guitar, violin
- Butch Norton – drums, percussion
- Tom Overby – production
- David Sutton – bass guitar

== Charts ==
Chart performance for Good Souls Better Angels
Chart (2020)	Peak
Australian Albums (ARIA)	59
Dutch Albums (Album Top 100)	24
French Albums (SNEP)	197
German Albums (Offizielle Top 100)	33
Scottish Albums (Official Charts)	3
Swiss Albums (Schweizer Hitparade)	21
UK Albums (Official Charts)	30
UK Americana Albums (Official Charts)	1
UK Jazz & Blues Albums (Official Charts)	1
US Billboard 200	144
US Americana/Folk Albums (Billboard)	3
US Independent Albums (Billboard)	20
US Top Rock Albums (Billboard)	21

== See also ==
- List of 2020 albums
