= Something About What Happens When We Talk =

1993 single by Lucinda Williams

Single by Lucinda Williams

from the album Sweet Old World
- Released: 1993
- Genre: Alternative country, Americana, Blues, roots rock
- Length: 3:50 (Album version)
- Label: Chameleon
- Songwriter(s): Lucinda Williams
- Producer(s): Williams; Dusty Wakeman; Gurf Morlix

Lucinda Williams singles chronology
"Six Blocks Away" (1992)	"Something About What Happens When We Talk" (1993)	"Right in Time" (1998)

"Something About What Happens When We Talk" is a song written and performed by American singer-songwriter Lucinda Williams. It was released in 1993 as the fourth single from her fourth album, Sweet Old World (1992).

The song was featured in the 1996 drama film Unhook the Stars, and the 2014 Cheryl Strayed biographical adventure film Wild. It was also featured in the 2005 HBO miniseries Empire Falls.

== Critical reception ==
Country music website Holler listed "Something About What Happens When We Talk" as No. 7 of the best Lucinda Williams songs; “This comfortingly country ballad is Lucinda’s best attempt to describe the tantalizing effects of exchanging words with a particular person. She is unapologetic in her sexually charged search for meaningful conversation. Lush vocals convey her regrets over spare arrangements, kicking herself for never having crossed the line from making conversation to making love.” Music website Return of Rock ranked it at No. 9 on their list of Williams' 12 songs.

NPR also named it one of Williams' best songs, writing " The originality of Williams's mind shines on this vulnerable ballad about the aphrodisiacal charge of meaningful conversation." In their review of Sweet Old World, Rolling Stone wrote "Morlix’s delicate lead and slide fills decorate the tune sparingly", while the song is "a paean to a platonic relationship — that is, until the end, when she sings, 'Well, I can’t stay around ’cause I’m going back South/But all I regret now is I never kissed your mouth'."

== Track listing ==
CD single

- "Asked For Water ( He Gave Me Gasoline)" – 3:43
- "Something About What Happens When We Talk" – 2:25
- "I Just Wanted To See You So Bad" – 2:25
- "Passionate Kisses" – 2:35
- "Lies Around Your Eyes" – 2:25
