= Happy Woman Blues =

Studio album by Lucinda Williams
- Released: 1980
- Recorded: April–June 1980
- Studio: SugarHill (Houston, Texas)
- Genre: Blues; folk; country
- Length: 35:13
- Label: Smithsonian Folkways
- Producer: Mickey White, Lucinda Williams

Lucinda Williams chronology
Ramblin' on My Mind (1979)	Happy Woman Blues (1980)	Lucinda Williams (1988)

Alternative cover
- 1990 reissue album cover

Happy Woman Blues is the second studio album by American singer-songwriter Lucinda Williams, released in 1980 by Smithsonian Folkways.

While her debut album, Ramblin' on My Mind (1979), consisted entirely of cover recordings, all of Happy Woman Blues was written solely by Williams. She also produced the album, alongside Mickey White. Supported by a six-member band, the songs are a mix of traditional and alternative country, folk, and blues that reflect her Louisiana roots.

== Critical reception ==
Professional ratings
Review scores
Source	Rating
AllMusic	4/5 stars
The Village Voice	A−

Happy Woman Blues was met with critical acclaim. Robert Christgau, writing for The Village Voice, gave the album an "A−", and called Williams a "guileless throwback to the days of the acoustic blues mamas" who "means what she says and says what she means". Trouser Press felt the record was more "rock-oriented" than Williams' debut album, writing that she used timeworn ideas such as "smoke-stained bars, open roads and a heart that never learns" but reimagined them "in a way that is both contemporary and uncynical".

In a retrospective review for AllMusic, Kurt Wolff wrote that "King of Hearts", "Sharp Cutting Wings", and "Lafayette" are well composed, emotionally powerful classics on an album that was bold, refreshing, and "stunning for its mixture of blues, folk, and country traditions with [Williams'] captivating, complex, and visceral approach to writing and singing".

== Track listing ==
All tracks written by Lucinda Williams.

Side one
No.	Title	Length
1.	"Lafayette"	3:40
2.	"I Lost It"	2:52
3.	"Maria"	3:45
4.	"Happy Woman Blues"	3:08
5.	"King of Hearts"	4:02

Side two
No.	Title	Length
1.	"Rolling Along"	2:46
2.	"One Night Stand"	2:53
3.	"Howlin' at Midnight"	3:49
4.	"Hard Road"	2:29
5.	"Louisiana Man"	2:23
6.	"Sharp Cutting Wings (Song to a Poet)"	3:26
Total length:		35:13

== Personnel ==
- Lucinda Williams – lead vocals, acoustic guitars
- Mickey White – acoustic rhythm and lead guitars, harmony vocals
- Rex Bell – electric bass, harmony vocals
- Andre Mathews – electric rhythm, lead and slide guitars
- Ira Wilkes – drums
- "Uncle" Mickey Moody – pedal steel guitar
- Malcolm Smith – fiddle, viola

Technical

- "Uncle" Mickey Moody - engineer
- Ronald Clyne - cover design
