= Stories from a Rock n Roll Heart =

Studio album by Lucinda Williams
- Released: June 30, 2023
- Studios: Room & Board (Nashville); RCA Studio A (Nashville)
- Genres: Rock; Americana
- Length: 49:12
- Labels: Highway 20; Thirty Tigers
- Producers: Tom Overby; Ray Kennedy; Lucinda Williams

Lucinda Williams chronology
Good Souls Better Angels (2020)	Stories from a Rock n Roll Heart (2023)	World's Gone Wrong (2026)

Stories from a Rock n Roll Heart is the 15th studio album by American singer-songwriter Lucinda Williams. It was released on June 30, 2023, by Highway 20 Records with distribution by Thirty Tigers.

The album was announced on April 4, 2023, simultaneously with the release of its lead single "New York Comeback", which features Bruce Springsteen and Patti Scialfa on backing vocals. The second single, "Stolen Moments", was released on April 21, 2023. A third single, "Where the Song Will Find Me", was released on May 26, 2023.

== Critical reception ==
Professional ratings
Aggregate scores
Source	Rating
AnyDecentMusic?	7.6/10
Metacritic	79/100
Review scores
Source	Rating
AllMusic	3.5/5 stars
American Songwriter	4.5/5 stars
Exclaim!	8/10
Pitchfork	7.7/10
Slant Magazine	3.5/5 stars

Stories from a Rock n Roll Heart received a score of 79 out of 100 on review aggregator Metacritic from 14 reviews, indicating "generally favorable" reception. AnyDecentMusic? sums up critical consensus as an 7.5 out of 10, with ten reviews. Classic Rock wrote that the album "is all heart, the camaraderie is immense, and Williams assures listeners that's it's not dark yet", and Uncut remarked that there is "little on her 16th album to suggest it's anything other than business as usual". Dylan Barnabe of Exclaim! called the album "all heart" and opined that "Williams not only makes her triumphant return but also showcases the true spirit of rock 'n' roll" and "her perseverance in the face of adversity is truly inspiring, and these stories are tales to live by". Hal Horowitz of American Songwriter stated: "These stories resonate with strength and an irrepressible spirit few other artists can summon. Williams' ability to persevere over issues that would sideline lesser talents and create music this impressive is a testament to the vitality of her rock 'n' roll heart."

AllMusic's Mark Deming gave the album 3.5 stars out of 5 and wrote: "Stories from a Rock 'n' Roll Heart isn't the triumphant return some might have hoped for, but for its flaws, it shows Williams hasn't lost her spark or her determination to create." He also singled out the tracks "Stolen Moments", "This Is Not My Town", and "Last Call for the Truth" as "soulful and evocative tales of bruised emotions and lives out of balance", and concluded "even when the songwriting is below Williams' average, her vocals are still a wondrous mix of toughness and fragility, and the album sounds great, with a superb studio band generating the right blend of rock 'n' roll swagger and bluesy loneliness."

== Track listing ==
Stories from a Rock n Roll Heart track listing
No.	Title	Writer(s)	Length
1.	"Let's Get the Band Back Together"	Lucinda Williams; Tom Overby; Jesse Malin	4:42
2.	"New York Comeback"	Williams; Overby; Malin	4:14
3.	"Last Call for the Truth"	Williams; Overby; Travis Stephens	5:24
4.	"Jukebox"	Williams; Overby; Malin; Stephens	4:35
5.	"Stolen Moments"	Williams; Overby	4:48
6.	"Rock n Roll Heart"	Williams; Overby; Stephens	3:48
7.	"This Is Not My Town"	Williams; Overby; Stephens	5:32
8.	"Hum's Liquor"	Williams; Overby; Stephens	4:07
9.	"Where the Song Will Find Me"	Williams; Overby; Stephens	6:34
10.	"Never Gonna Fade Away"	Williams; Overby	5:23
Total length:			49:12

== Personnel ==
Credits adapted from the album's liner notes.

=== Musicians ===
- Lucinda Williams – lead vocals
- Steve Mackey – bass
- Stuart Mathis – electric guitar
- Steve Ferrone – drums (tracks 1–6, 8)
- Doug Pettibone – electric guitar (1, 2, 5, 6, 8), steel guitar (3, 4)
- Reese Wynans – B3 (1–3, 5–7, 10), piano (1), Vox Jaguar organ (7)
- Siobhan Maher Kennedy – backing vocals (1, 3, 5, 10)
- Margo Price – tambourine (1, 7), backing vocals (1)
- Jeremy Ivey – backing vocals (1)
- Buddy Miller – backing vocals (1)
- Sophie Gault – backing vocals (1)
- Ray Kennedy – tambourine (2, 5, 6); acoustic guitar, Vox Continental organ (8)
- Bruce Springsteen – backing vocals (2, 6)
- Patti Scialfa – backing vocals (2, 6)
- Travis Stephens – acoustic guitar (4)
- Rob Clores – piano (4)
- Angel Olsen – backing vocals (4)
- Derek Cruz – electric guitar (6)
- Will Sayles – drums (7)
- Jim Oblon – electric guitar (7)
- Tommy Stinson – backing vocals (8)
- Fred Eltringham – drums (9, 10)
- Joshua Grange – electric guitar (9, 10)
- Lawrence Rothman – arrangement, strings, horns, Chamberlin, Novachord (9)

=== Technical and visuals ===
- Tom Overby – production
- Ray Kennedy – production, recording, mixing
- Lucinda Williams – production
- Phillip Smith – engineering assistance
- Collin Lott – engineering assistance
- Pete Lyman – mastering
- Daniel Bacigalupi – mastering assistance
- Andy West – design
- Danny Clinch – photography
- Lorraine Abeles – hair and makeup
- Mimi Fisher – wardrobe

== Charts ==
Chart performance for Stories from a Rock n Roll Heart
Chart (2023)	Peak position
Belgian Albums (Ultratop Flanders)	57
Dutch Albums (Album Top 100)	26
German Albums (Offizielle Top 100)	36
Scottish Albums (Official Charts)	9
Spanish Albums (Promusicae)	60
Swiss Albums (Schweizer Hitparade)	35
UK Albums (Official Charts)	65
UK Independent Albums (Official Charts)	5
US Billboard 200	159
