= Little Honey =

Studio album by Lucinda Williams
- Released: October 14, 2008
- Genres: Americana, folk rock, alternative country, heartland rock
- Length: 64:44
- Label: Lost Highway
- Producers: Eric Leljestrand, Tom Overby

Lucinda Williams chronology
West (2007)	Little Honey (2008)	Blessed (2011)

Little Honey is the ninth studio album by American singer-songwriter Lucinda Williams, released on October 14, 2008, by Lost Highway Records. The album debuted at No. 9 on the Billboard 200, selling 35,000 copies that week, thereby becoming her first Top 10 album.

A critical and commercial success, the album earned Williams a nomination for the Grammy Award for Best Americana Album in 2010, the first year to feature this category.

== Music and lyrics ==
The album includes guest appearances by Elvis Costello, Susanna Hoffs, Matthew Sweet and Charlie Louvin. "Circles and X's" was written in 1985, around the same time was "If Wishes Were Horses," while "Well Well Well" dates from 1991. "Real Love" was released to radio and digital outlets as the first single.

== Critical reception ==
Professional ratings
Aggregate scores
Source	Rating
Metacritic	72/100
Review scores
Source	Rating
AllMusic	2008
Blender	2007
Entertainment Weekly	B− 2008
Rolling Stone	2008
Slant Magazine	2008
Spin	2008
The Boston Globe	unfavorable 2008
The New York Times	2008
The Times	2008
USA Today	2008

Little Honey was met with positive critical reception. At Metacritic, which assigns a weighted average rating out of 100 to reviews from mainstream publications, the album received an average score of 72, based on 23 reviews. Spin called it "her finest record since Car Wheels on a Gravel Road," stating she "goes back to the roots-rock well and takes a long, satisfying swig". Rolling Stone rated the 4 out of 5 stars, singling out the track "If Wishes Were Horses" as "sublime". AllMusic called the album "the most polished and studied record she's ever made", stating "its sound is utterly contemporary, though its forms are rooted in electric '70s rock as well as her fallbacks on blues and old-school Americana", but concluded that there are "songs that pack some punch, but no jaw-dropping wallops".

== Awards ==
Award nominations for Little Honey
Year	Award	Category	Nominated work	Result	Ref.
2009	Grammy Awards	Best Americana Album	Little Honey	Nominated	

== Track listing ==
All songs by Lucinda Williams, except where indicated.

Track listing
No.	Title	Writer(s)	Length
1	Real Love		3:45
2	Circles and X's		3:40
3	Tears of Joy		4:27
4	Little Rock Star		5:42
5	Honey Bee		3:05
6	Well Well Well		4:29
7	If Wishes Were Horses		5:40
8	Jailhouse Tears		5:28
9	Knowing		6:00
10	Heaven Blues		5:23
11	Rarity		8:43
12	Plan to Marry		3:26
13	It's a Long Way to the Top	Angus Young; Malcolm Young; Bon Scott	4:56
Total length			64:44

=== Bonus tracks ===
Bonus tracks
No.	Title	Availability	Length
1	"Jailhouse Tears" (Demo)	Best Buy download/UK CD bonus track	4:49
2	"Rarity" (Demo)	Best Buy download	7:35
3	"Knowing" (Demo)	Best Buy download	4:42
4	"Circles & X's" (Demo)	Best Buy download	3:58
5	"If Wishes Were Horses" (Demo)	Best Buy download	4:55
6	"Real Love" (Alternate Early Version)	iTunes United States	3:39

== "Lu in '08" EP ==
Released on October 28, 2008, as a Digital-Only EP featuring 4 live tracks (3 covers and one original):

1. "Masters of War" (Originally performed by Bob Dylan)
2. "For What It's Worth" (Originally performed by Buffalo Springfield)
3. "Marching the Hate Machines Into the Sun" (Originally performed by Thievery Corporation feat. Wayne Coyne)
4. "Bone of Contention" (Lucinda Williams original)^{A}

Notes

- ^{A} "Bone of Contention" has been incorrectly regarded as an "AmazonMP3" exclusive bonus track. The live version (from the "Lu in '08" ep) was given away free to those who pre-ordered "Little Honey" from Amazon.com.

== Personnel ==
- Lucinda Williams – vocals, acoustic guitar
- Butch Norton – drums, percussion
- David Sutton – electric bass, double bass, cello
- Chet Lyster – electric and acoustic guitars, saw and table steel
- Doug Pettibone – electric and acoustic guitars, pedal steel

Additional musicians

- Rob Burger – wurlitzer, vibraphone, piano, Hammond organ
- Matthew Sweet, Susanna Hoffs – backing vocals ("Real Love", "Little Rock Star", "Rarity")
- Charlie Louvin, Jim Lauderdale – backing vocals ("Well Well Well")
- Elvis Costello – vocals ("Jailhouse Tears")
- Susan Marshall, Gia Ciambotti, Kristen Mooney – backing vocals ("Tears of Joy")
- Kristen Mooney, Tim Easton, Susan Marshall – backing vocals ("It's a Long Way to the Top")
- Jim Lauderdale, Susan Marshall, Gia Ciambotti, Kristen Mooney – backing vocals ("Jailhouse Tears")
- Bruce Fowler – trombone
- Walt Fowler – flugelhorn
- Albert Wing – tenor saxophone

== Charts ==
Chart performance for Little Honey
Chart (2008)	Peak position
Australian Albums (ARIA)	68
Belgian Albums (Ultratop Flanders)	82
Dutch Albums (Album Top 100)	57
Irish Albums (IRMA)	66
Italian Albums (FIMI)	77
New Zealand Albums (RMNZ)	25
Norwegian Albums (VG-lista)	33
Swedish Albums (Sverigetopplistan)	25
UK Albums (OCC)	51
UK Country Albums (Official Charts)	1
US Billboard 200	9
US Rock Albums (Billboard)	5
