= Lucinda Williams =

American musician (born 1953)

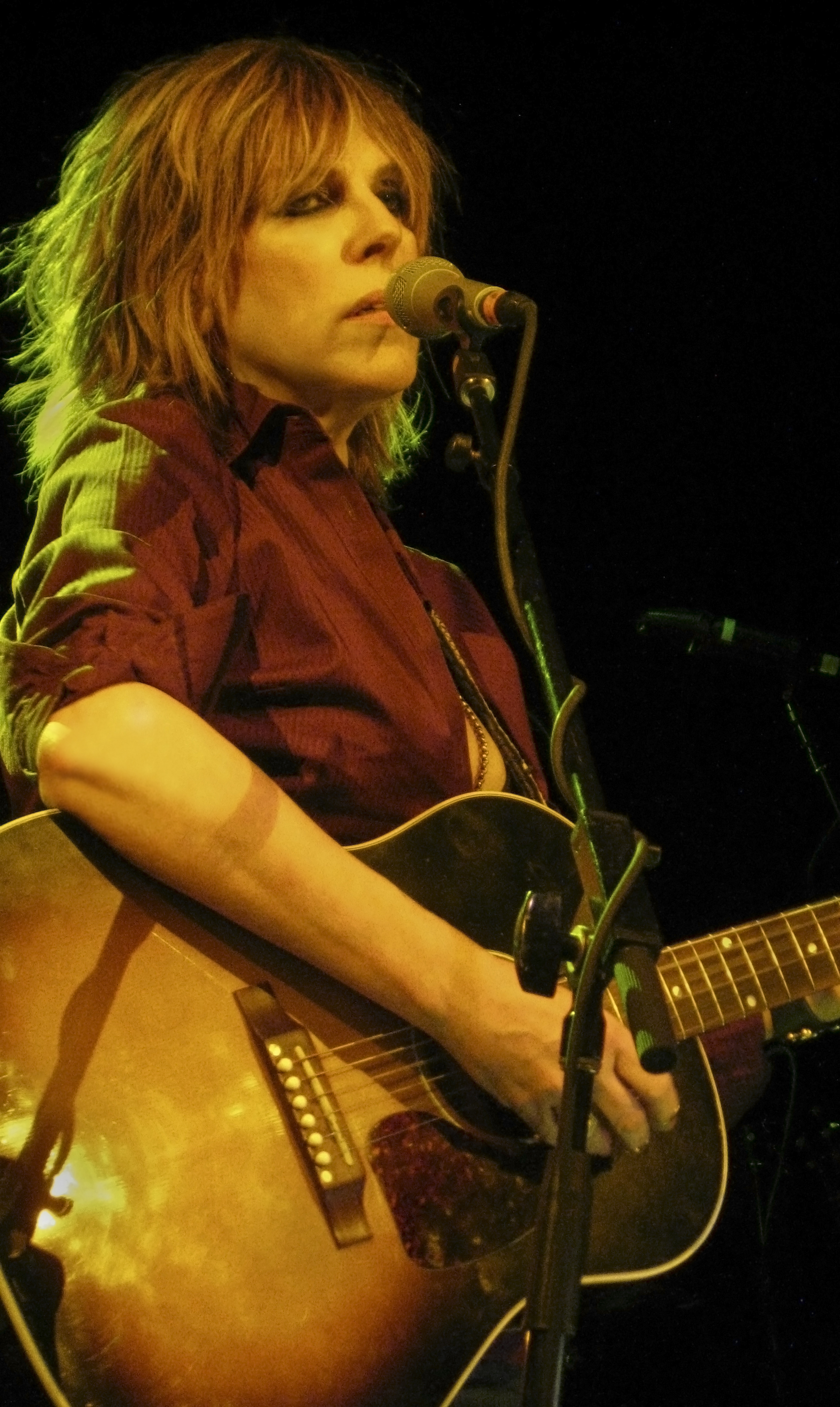
- Williams performing in 2009

Background information
- Born: Lucinda Gayl Williams; January 26, 1953 (age 73); Lake Charles, Louisiana, U.S.
- Genres: Americana; contemporary folk; alternative country; country rock
- Occupations: Singer; songwriter; musician
- Instruments: Vocals; guitar
- Years active: 1978–present
- Labels: Highway 20; Lost Highway; Mercury; Chameleon; Rough Trade; Folkways
- Website: lucindawilliams.com

Lucinda Gayl Williams (Note: Some sources spell her middle name as Gayle.) (born January 26, 1953) is an American singer-songwriter and a solo guitarist. She recorded her first two albums, Ramblin' on My Mind (1979) and Happy Woman Blues (1980), in a traditional country and blues style that received critical praise but little public or radio attention. In 1988, she released her third album, Lucinda Williams, to widespread critical acclaim. Regarded as "an Americana classic", the album also featured "Passionate Kisses", a song later recorded by Mary Chapin Carpenter for her 1992 album Come On Come On, which garnered Williams her first Grammy Award for Best Country Song in 1994. Williams released her fourth album, Sweet Old World, four years later in 1992. Sweet Old World was met with further critical acclaim and was voted the 11th best album of 1992 in The Village Voice's Pazz & Jop, an annual poll of prominent music critics. Robert Christgau, the poll's creator, ranked it 6th on his own year-end list, later writing that the album as well as Lucinda Williams were "gorgeous, flawless, brilliant".

Williams' commercial breakthrough came in 1998 with Car Wheels on a Gravel Road, an album presenting a broader scope of songs that fused rock, blues, country and Americana into a distinctive style that remained consistent and commercial. Featuring the singles "Right in Time" and the Grammy nominated "Can't Let Go", Car Wheels on a Gravel Road was universally acclaimed by critics and became Williams' greatest commercial success to date; it was certified Gold by the RIAA the following year and earned her a Grammy Award for Best Contemporary Folk Album. Williams' next album, Essence, appeared in 2001 to further critical acclaim and commercial success, becoming her first Top 40 album on the Billboard 200, peaking at No. 28. Featuring a more downbeat musical tone, with spare, intimate arrangements, Essence earned Williams three Grammy nominations in 2002: Best Contemporary Folk Album, Best Female Pop Vocal Performance for the title track, and Best Female Rock Vocal Performance for the single "Get Right With God", which she won.

One of the most celebrated singer-songwriters of her generation, Williams has released a string of albums since that have earned her further critical acclaim and commercial success, including World Without Tears (2003), West (2007), Little Honey (2008), Blessed (2011), Down Where the Spirit Meets the Bone (2014), The Ghosts of Highway 20 (2016), and Good Souls Better Angels (2020). She has won three Grammy Awards from 18 nominations, and has received two Americana Awards (one competitive, one honorary) from 11 nominations. Williams ranked No. 97 on VH1's 100 Greatest Women in Rock & Roll in 1999, and was named "America's best songwriter" by Time magazine in 2002. In 2015, Rolling Stone ranked her the 79th greatest songwriter of all time. In 2017, she received the Berklee College of Music Honorary Doctorate of Music Degree, and ranked No. 91 on Rolling Stone's 100 Greatest Country Artists of All Time. In 2020, Car Wheels on a Gravel Road ranked No. 97 and Lucinda Williams ranked No. 426 on Rolling Stone's 500 Greatest Albums of All Time. She was inducted into the Austin City Limits Hall of Fame in 2021. That same year, "Passionate Kisses" ranked No. 437 on Rolling Stone's 500 Greatest Songs of All Time.

== Early life ==
Williams was born in Lake Charles, Louisiana, the daughter of poet and literature professor Miller Williams and amateur pianist Lucille Fern Day. Her parents divorced in the mid-1960s. Williams' father gained custody of her and her younger brother, Robert Miller, and sister Karyn Elizabeth. Like her father, Williams has spina bifida. Her father worked as a visiting professor in Mexico and different parts of the United States, including Baton Rouge; New Orleans; Jackson, Mississippi and Utah, before settling at the University of Arkansas in Fayetteville. Williams never graduated from high school but was accepted into the University of Arkansas. Williams started writing when she was six years old. She showed an affinity for music at an early age and was playing guitar at 12. Her first live performance was in Mexico City at 17 as part of a duo with her friend, banjo player Clark Jones.

== Career ==
=== 1978–1987: Early career ===
By her early 20s Williams was playing in public in Austin and Houston, Texas, concentrating on a blend of folk, rock and country music. She moved to Jackson, Mississippi, in 1978 to record her first album for Folkways Records. Released in 1979 and titled Ramblin' on My Mind, the album was a collection of country and blues covers. Smithsonian Folkways provided a description: "The first recordings from an artist with a gift for interpreting original blues from Robert Johnson to Memphis Minnie to the Carter Family. Williams' unmistakable sound is powerfully direct and filled with melancholy and passion." When the album was re-issued in 1991, the title was shortened to Ramblin'.

Williams' second album, Happy Woman Blues, appeared the following year and consisted of her own material. Trouser Press felt the record was more "rock-oriented" than Williams' debut album, writing that she used timeworn ideas such as "smoke-stained bars, open roads and a heart that never learns" but reimagined them "in a way that is both contemporary and uncynical". One album track, "I Lost It", was re-recorded 18 years later for Williams' fifth album Car Wheels on a Gravel Road (1998). In the 1980s, Williams moved to Los Angeles, California, before finally settling in Nashville, Tennessee. In California, sometimes backed by a rock band and at other times performing in acoustic settings, she developed a following and a critical reputation. While based in Los Angeles she was briefly married to Long Ryders drummer Greg Sowders, whom she had met in a club.

=== 1988–1997: Lucinda Williams, Sweet Old World, and critical acclaim ===
In 1988, Williams released her self-titled third album, on Rough Trade Records. Produced by Williams, along with Gurf Morlix, and Dusty Wakeman, the album was met with widespread critical acclaim and was voted the 16th best album of the year in The Village Voice's annual Pazz & Jop critics poll. It has since been viewed as a leading work in the development of the Americana movement. In 2014, Robin Denselow called it "an Americana classic" in The Guardian, while Stephen M. Deusner wrote for CMT that it was "a roots-rock landmark, ground zero for today's burgeoning Americana movement". A retrospective review from AllMusic stated "Every song packs an emotional punch line and rewards the listener each time with something new". The single "Changed the Locks", about a broken relationship, received radio play around the country and gained fans among music insiders, including Tom Petty, who would later cover the song in 1996 on the soundtrack album to the Edward Burns film She's The One. It also features "The Night's Too Long", later recorded by Patty Loveless in 1990 for her album On Down the Line, and "Passionate Kisses", later recorded by Mary Chapin Carpenter for her album Come On Come On (1992). Adhering closely in tempo, feel, and instrumentation to Williams' original recording, "Passionate Kisses" became a major hit for Carpenter, enhancing her crossover appeal and earning her the Grammy Award for Best Female Country Vocal Performance in 1994, while it earned Williams the Grammy Award for Best Country Song.

In 1991, the song "Lucinda Williams" appeared on Vic Chesnutt's album West of Rome. The following year, Williams released her fourth album, Sweet Old World, on the Chameleon label. Also produced alongside Morlix and Wakeman, Sweet Old World was a melancholy album dealing with themes of suicide and death. The album received mass critical acclaim, and was voted the 11th best album of 1992 in The Village Voice's Pazz & Jop poll. Robert Christgau, the poll's creator, ranked it 6th on his own year-end list, later writing that the album was "gorgeous, flawless, brilliant [with] short-story details ('chess pieces,' 'dresses that zip up the side') packing a textural thrill akin to local color". AllMusic's Steve Huey said it was just as good as her 1988 self-titled album, calling it "a gorgeous, elegiac record that not only consolidates but expands Williams' ample talents." The track "Something About What Happens When We Talk" was later featured in the Cheryl Strayed biographical adventure film Wild (2014), starring Reese Witherspoon and Laura Dern.

During this period, Williams' biggest commercial successes remained as a songwriter. Emmylou Harris said of Williams, "She is an example of the best of what country at least says it is, but, for some reason, she's completely out of the loop and I feel strongly that that's country music's loss." Harris later recorded the title track from Sweet Old World for her career-redefining 1995 album, Wrecking Ball. In 1996, Williams duetted with Steve Earle on the song "You're Still Standin' There" from his album I Feel Alright. Williams also gained a reputation as a perfectionist and slow worker when it came to recording. Six years would pass before her next album release, though she appeared as a guest on other artists' albums and contributed to several tribute compilations during this period.

=== 1998–1999: Car Wheels on a Gravel Road and commercial breakthrough ===
Williams' long-awaited 1998 album Car Wheels on a Gravel Road was her breakthrough into the mainstream. The album received widespread critical acclaim, topping the annual Pazz & Jop poll, and received a Grammy Award for Best Contemporary Folk Album in 1999. It became Williams' first album to chart on Billboard 200, peaking at No. 68 and remained on the chart for over five months. The album also went Gold within a year of release. Reviewing for Entertainment Weekly in July 1998, David Browne found Williams' hard-edged evocations of Southern rural life refreshing amid a music market overrun by timid, mass-produced female artists, while The Village Voice critic Robert Christgau argued at the time that she proved herself to be the era's "most accomplished record-maker" by honing traditional popular music composition, understated vocal emotions, and realistic narratives colored by her native experiences and values. In 2003, Rolling Stone magazine called the record an alternative country masterpiece and ranked it No. 304 on its list of the 500 Greatest Albums of All Time, and ranked it No. 305 in 2012's revised list. In September 2020, Rolling Stone updated its Top 500 albums of all-time list, which reflected an updated and diverse judging pool, and the album rose to No. 98 on that list.

The single "Can't Let Go" also enjoyed considerable crossover radio play and garnered Grammy nomination for Best Female Rock Vocal Performance for Williams. It was later covered by Robert Plant (best known as lead vocalist of Led Zeppelin) and Alison Krauss as a duet, released in 2021. Another song from the album, "Still I Long for Your Kiss", was featured on the soundtrack album of the 1998 Robert Redford film The Horse Whisperer. The track "Lake Charles" was later featured in the first episode of the HBO series True Blood, and was included on the first season's soundtrack album. On February 20, 1999, Williams performed the tracks "Can't Let Go" and "2 Kool 2 Be 4-Gotten" on Saturday Night Live (episode "Bill Murray/Lucinda Williams"). Williams toured with Bob Dylan, the Allman Brothers and Tom Petty and the Heartbreakers, and solo in support of the album. An expanded edition of the album, including three additional studio recordings and a second CD documenting a 1998 concert, was released in 2006. In 1999, she appeared on Return of the Grievous Angel: A Tribute to Gram Parsons, duetting with David Crosby on the title track.

=== 2000–2003: Essence and World Without Tears ===
Williams followed up the success of Car Wheels on a Gravel Road with Essence, released on June 5, 2001. Featuring a less produced, more down-tuned approach both musically and lyrically, Essence moved Williams further from the country music establishment, while winning fans in the alternative music world. The album received a Grammy nomination for Best Contemporary Folk Album in 2002, while Williams won the Grammy Award for Best Female Rock Vocal Performance for the single "Get Right With God", an atypically up-tempo gospel-rock tune from the otherwise rather low-key release. The title track includes a contribution on tremolo guitar by alternative country musician Ryan Adams, and earned Williams a nomination for the Grammy Award for Best Female Pop Vocal Performance. At the same ceremony, Williams was nominated for the Grammy Award for Best Female Country Vocal Performance for her cover of "Cold, Cold Heart", from the all-star Hank Williams tribute album, Timeless: Hank Williams Tribute (2001). On January 13, 2002, Williams performed with Elvis Costello on the inaugural episode of CMT Crossroads. Later that year, Time magazine christened Williams "America's best songwriter", and CMT ranked her No. 36 on its list of the 40 Greatest Women of Country Music.

Her seventh album, World Without Tears, was released on April 8, 2003. A musically adventurous though lyrically downbeat album, this release found Williams experimenting with talking blues stylings and electric blues. It received critical acclaim and was a commercial success, becoming Williams' first Top 20 album on the Billboard 200, peaking at No. 18. AllMusic called it "the bravest, most emotionally wrenching record she's ever issued". In his review for the Los Angeles Times, Robert Hilburn deemed it "a rock 'n' roll workout", writing that its edgiest songs sounded "close to the raw, disoriented feel" of the Rolling Stones' 1972 album Exile on Main St.. World Without Tears earned Williams two Grammy nominations in 2004: Best Contemporary Folk Album, and Best Female Rock Vocal Performance for the single "Righteously". The previous year, Williams was nominated for Best Female Country Vocal Performance for her cover of Greg Brown's "Lately", from Going Driftless: An Artists' Tribute to Greg Brown.

=== 2004–2009: West, Little Honey, and continued success ===
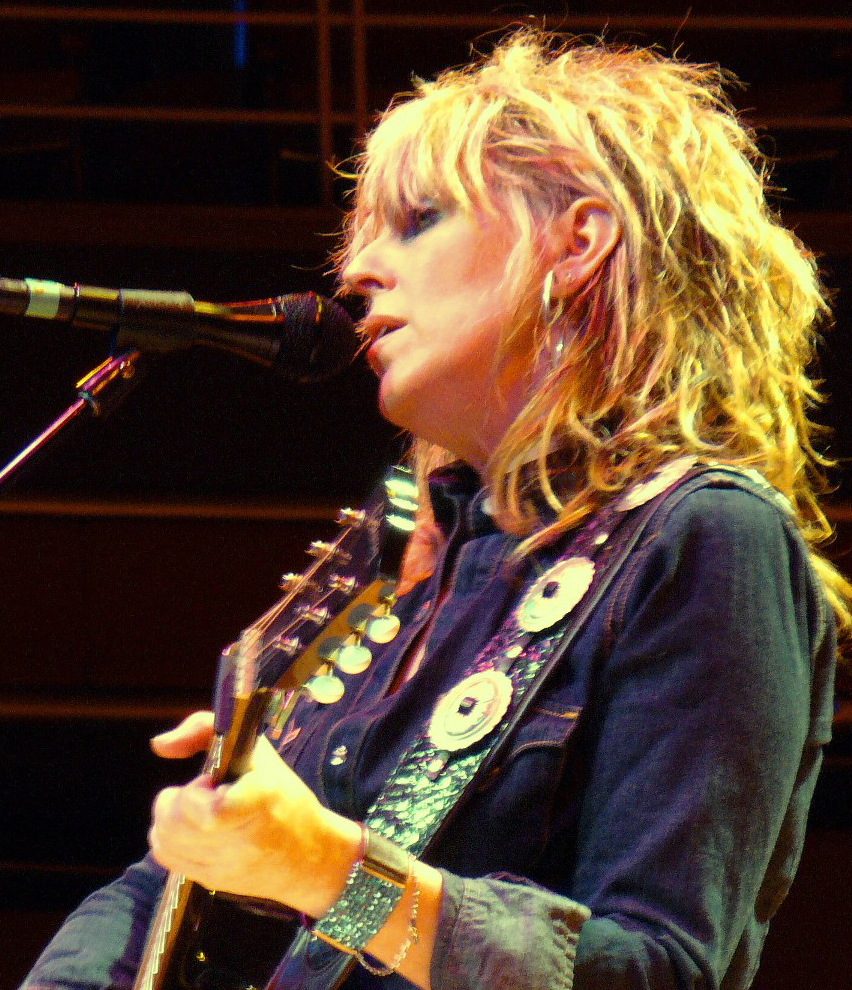
Williams performs at Symphony Hall, Birmingham, England in 2006

Williams was a guest vocalist on the song "Factory Girls" from Irish punk-folk band Flogging Molly's 2004 album "Within a Mile of Home", and appeared on Elvis Costello's The Delivery Man (2004). She sang with folk legend Ramblin' Jack Elliott on the track "Careless Darling" from his 2006 album I Stand Alone. In 2006, she recorded a version of the John Hartford classic "Gentle on My Mind", which played over the closing credits of the Will Ferrell film Talladega Nights: The Ballad of Ricky Bobby.

On February 13, 2007, Williams released her eighth album, West, for which she wrote more than 27 songs. It addresses her mother's death and a tumultuous relationship break-up. The album's lead single, "Are You Alright?", was ranked No. 34 on Rolling Stone's list of the 100 Best Songs of 2007, while the third single, "Come On", earned Williams two Grammy nominations: Best Solo Rock Vocal Performance and Best Rock Song. In the fall of 2007, Williams announced a series of shows in Los Angeles and New York. Playing five nights in each city, she performed her entire catalog on consecutive nights. These albums include the self-titled Lucinda Williams (1988), Sweet Old World (1992), Car Wheels on a Gravel Road (1998), Essence (2001), and World Without Tears (2003). Each night also featured a second set with special guest stars, including Steve Earle, Allison Moorer, Mike Campbell, Greg Dulli, E, Ann Wilson, Emmylou Harris, David Byrne, David Johansen, Yo la Tengo, John Doe, Chuck Prophet, Jim Lauderdale and Shelby Lynne. Each night's album set was recorded and made available to the attendees that night. These live recordings are currently available on her website and at her shows.

Williams wrapped recording on her ninth album in March 2008. Titled Little Honey, it was released on October 14 of that year and become her first Top 10 album on the Billboard 200, peaking at No. 9. Spin called it "her finest record since Car Wheels on a Gravel Road," stating she "goes back to the roots-rock well and takes a long, satisfying swig", while AllMusic called it "the most polished and studied record she's ever made". It earned Williams a Grammy nomination for Best Americana Album in 2010 (the first year to feature this category). The album includes 13 songs—among them, "Real Love" and "Little Rock Star", the latter inspired by music celebrities in the press, like Pete Doherty and Amy Winehouse. It also includes a cover of AC/DC's "It's a Long Way to the Top (If You Wanna Rock 'n' Roll)", and "Rarity", inspired by singer-songwriter Mia Doi Todd.

In July 2008, though "Little Honey" was yet to be released, Paste listened to an advance copy and ranked the duet between Williams and Elvis Costello on the song "Jailhouse Tears" as the No. 5 all-time greatest country/rock duet. Her 2008 concert appearance at the Catalyst in Santa Cruz contained an announcement by the city's mayor that September 6, 2008, would henceforth be Lucinda Williams Day. In June 2008, she sang lead vocal on M. Ward's cover of "Oh Lonesome Me" for his "Hold Time" record (Merge Records).

=== 2010–2015: Blessed and Down Where the Spirit Meets the Bone ===
Williams released a cover of Shel Silverstein's "The Ballad of Lucy Jordan" in June 2010, as part of the Twistable, Turnable Man tribute album.

On March 1, 2011, Williams released her 10th studio album Blessed. Another critical and commercial success; the album debuted at No. 15 on the Billboard 200, and earned a Grammy nomination for Best Americana Album in 2012. It was also nominated for the Americana Award for Album of the Year. The track "Kiss Like Your Kiss" originally appeared in the HBO series True Blood, and was nominated for the Grammy Award for Best Song Written for a Motion Picture, Television or Other Visual Media the previous year. AllMusic wrote "Blessed is Williams' most focused recording since World Without Tears; it stands with it and her 1988 self-titled Rough Trade as one of her finest recordings to date. The Los Angeles Times called it "one of the best albums she's ever released".

In July 2011, Williams' performance of her song "Crescent City" at the New Orleans Jazz & Heritage Festival was included in HBO's Treme series 2 finale, episode 11; the characters comment that it was "amazing she wrote this before the storm", referring to Hurricane Katrina. In September 2012, Williams was featured in a campaign called "30 Songs / 30 Days" to support Half the Sky: Turning Oppression into Opportunity for Women Worldwide, a multi-platform media project inspired by Nicholas Kristof and Sheryl WuDunn's book. In 2012 and 2013, Williams toured the U.S. accompanied only by guitarist Doug Pettibone.

On September 30, 2014, Williams released her 11th studio album, Down Where the Spirit Meets the Bone, and performed the track "Protection" on The Tonight Show Starring Jimmy Fallon. The first album on her Highway 20 Records label, Down Where the Spirit Meets the Bone was met with critical acclaim, and debuted at No. 13 on the Billboard 200. It won the Americana Music Award for Album of the Year in 2015, while the track "East Side of Town" was nominated for Song of the Year. That same year, she provided backup vocals for the Don Henley song "Train in the Distance" on his album Cass County.

=== 2015–2019: The Ghosts of Highway 20, This Sweet Old World, and Vanished Gardens ===
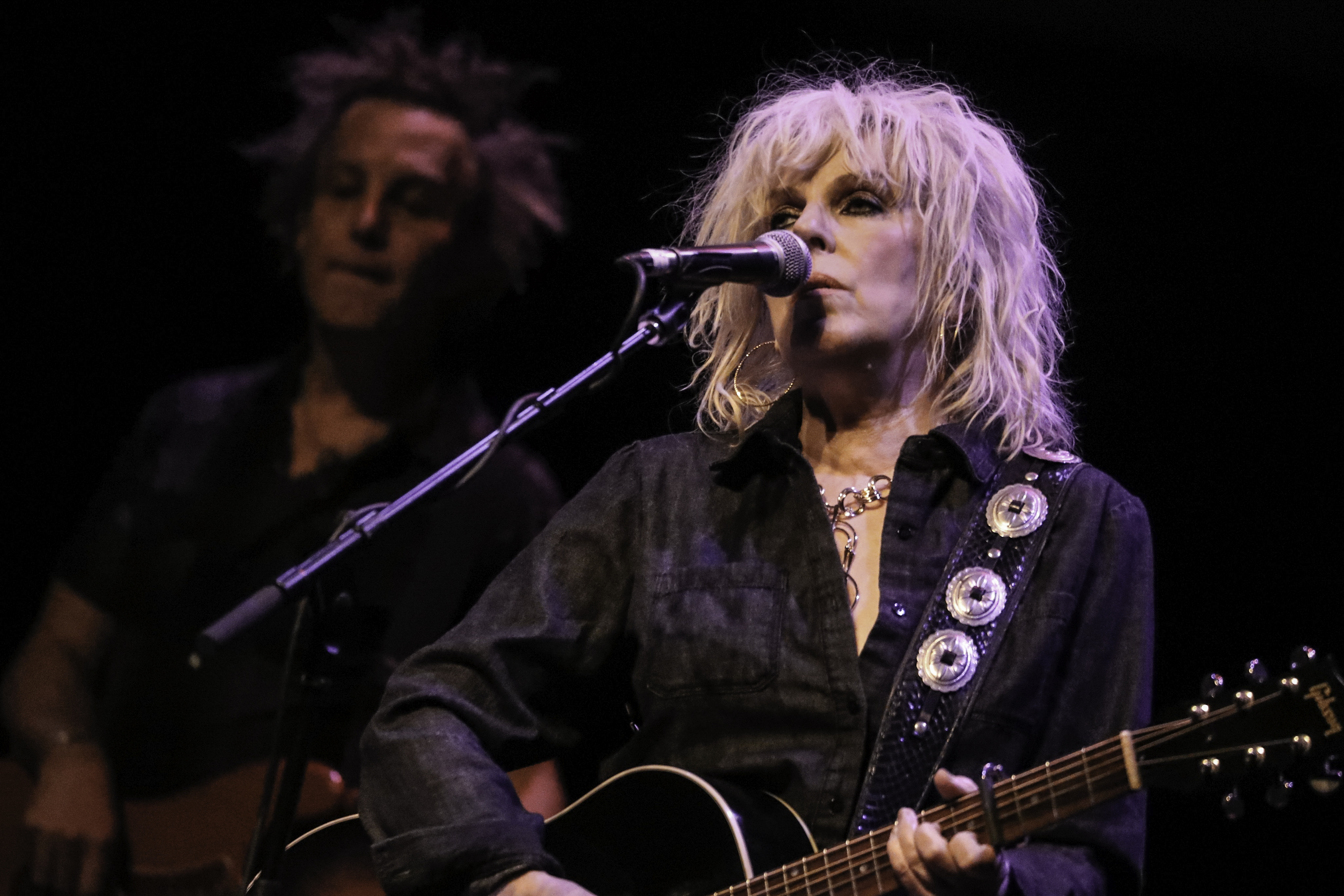
Williams performs at Fitzgerald Theater, St. Paul, MN in 2019

On February 5, 2016, Williams released her 12th studio album, The Ghosts of Highway 20, and performed the track "Dust" on The Late Show with Stephen Colbert on February 17, 2016. AllMusic wrote "after releasing one of the best and boldest albums of her career with Down Where the Spirit Meets the Bone, Williams goes from strength to strength with The Ghosts of Highway 20, and it seems like a welcome surprise that she's moving into one of the most fruitful periods of her recording career as she approaches her fourth decade as a musician". The album debuted at No. 36 on the Billboard 200, and was nominated for the Americana Music Award for Album of the Year.

On May 13, 2017, Williams was awarded an Honorary Doctorate of Music Degree from Berklee College of Music during the 2017 Commencement Concert. In June, Rolling Stone named Williams one of the 100 Greatest Country Artists of All Time. On September 29, 2017, she released This Sweet Old World, a re-recorded and expanded version of her 1992 album, Sweet Old World. Writing for Exclaim!, Mark Dunn gave the album seven out of 10, agreeing that Williams' voice has changed dramatically in the ensuing 25 years but noting that she uses it as an instrument masterfully, pairing it with stripped-down country arrangements, compared to the more pop feel of the 1992 release. George de Stefano of PopMatters gave the release nine stars out of ten, calling it a "surprising and bold move" and writes that both the re-recordings and the new tracks are "gems".

On June 29, 2018, Blue Note Records released Vanished Gardens, a collaborative album by Charles Lloyd & the Marvels and Williams, who performed on five tracks, including "Dust" from The Ghosts of Highway 20, "Ventura" from World Without Tears, and "Unsuffer Me" from West. Marvels members Bill Frisell and Greg Leisz had previously worked with Williams, including on her 1998 album Car Wheels on a Gravel Road. The album was met with critical acclaim; AllMusic wrote "the pairing of this band with Williams sounds natural, effortless, and holistic", while Rolling Stone called it a "savvy stylistic blend".

In 2019, Williams produced New York City singer-songwriter Jesse Malin's eighth studio album Sunset Kids, which was met with widespread critical acclaim. She co-wrote three tracks on the album, and performed on three tracks.

=== 2020–2021: Good Souls Better Angels and Lu's Jukebox ===
On February 4, 2020, Williams announced her album Good Souls Better Angels would be released on April 23. In the same Rolling Stone article, Williams released the first single from the album, "Man Without a Soul", which strongly alluded to then-President Donald Trump. Jon Breen of The Irish Times gave the release five out of five stars, writing that it "punch[es] with a dark, almost biblical vengeance but also, importantly, balance vitriol with solace, hellfire with a hand in need" and praising its timely lyrics. In American Songwriter, Hal Horowitz gave the release 4.5 out of five stars, writing that it is arguably her most intense album, ending his review: "By the end of the hour, you'll be wiped out. This is a devastatingly in your face, take no prisoners presentation from Williams and her band that will leave most serious listeners shattered and perhaps shaking. Few albums connect with this much pure emotional fury, let alone those from artists well into their 60s."

At the 63rd Annual Grammy Awards, Good Souls Better Angels received a nomination for Best Americana Album and songwriters Williams and Tom Overby received a nomination in the Best American Roots Song category for "Man Without a Soul". The album also made several critics' best-of-the-year lists, including Rolling Stone, which placed it at No. 47, while Mojo ranked it No. 38 on their list. In their alphabetical list, Pitchfork named it one of the 35 Best Rock Albums of 2020.

On March 19, 2020, Williams released a song she wrote for the Netflix movie Lost Girls, titled "Lost Girl". Later that year, Williams began "Lu's Jukebox", a six-episode series of themed live performances.

Williams was inducted into the Austin City Limits Hall of Fame in October 2021. Jason Isbell, who inducted Williams, credited her with creating a map for other singer-songwriters to follow; "A lot of my songs wouldn't exist if I hadn't spent so much time trying to rip her off", he stated in his speech. Isbell also performed Williams' "I Envy the Wind" from her 2002 album Essence. Williams also performed at the ceremony, she sang "Crescent City" with Rosanne Cash and "Changed the Locks" with Margo Price. Later that year, she appeared on the Robert Plant and Alison Krauss album Raise the Roof as a backing vocalist.

=== 2022–present: Honorary accolades, Stories from a Rock n Roll Heart, and World's Gone Wrong ===
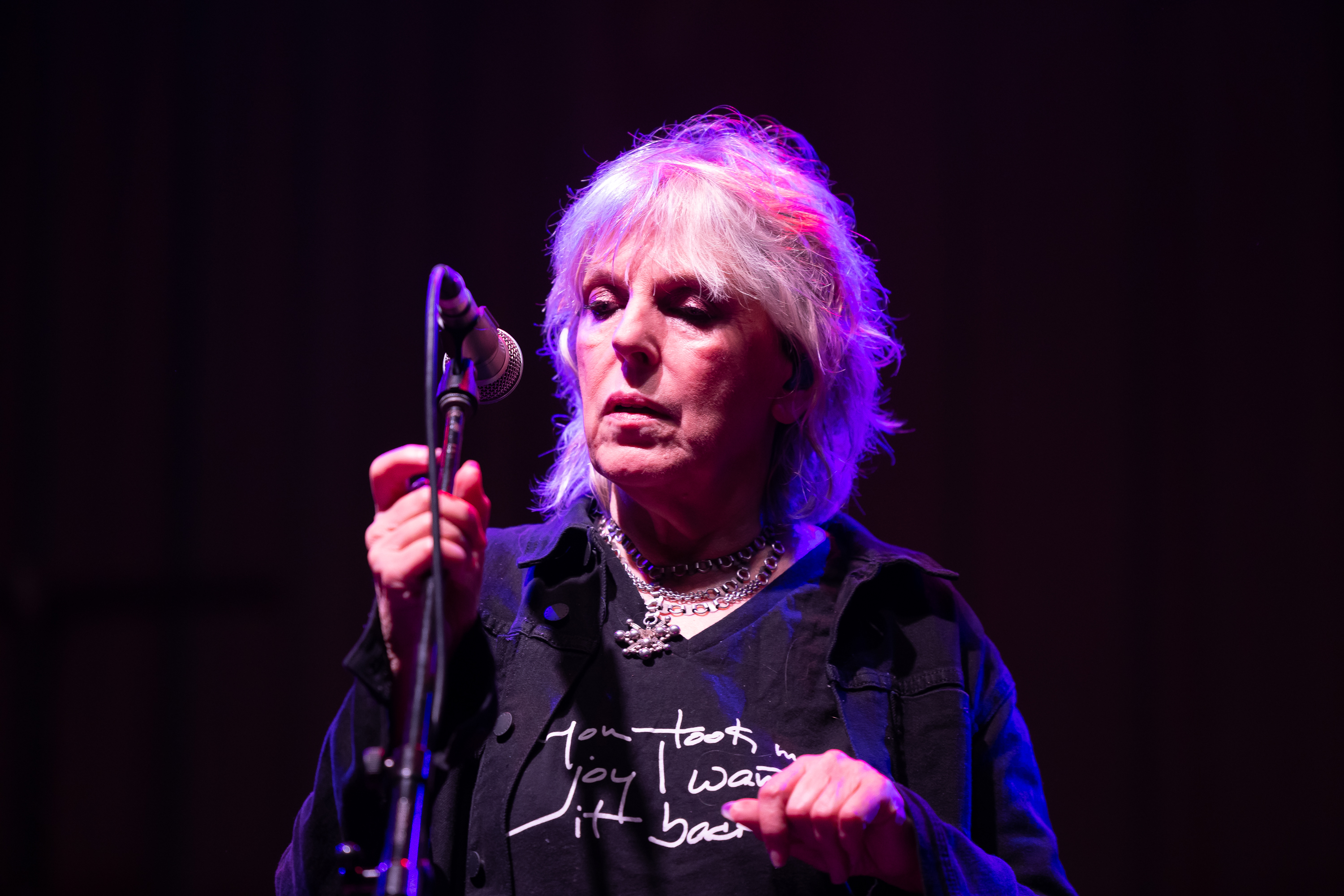
Williams performing in April 2023

On November 17, 2021, it was announced that Williams would receive the Americana Music Association-UK International Lifetime Achievement Award in January 2022. The ceremony was held on January 27, 2022. On September 12, 2022, Williams was the recipient of the BMI Troubadour Award. The award celebrates songwriters who have made a lasting impact on their community and who "craft for the sake of the song, setting the pace for generations of songwriters who will follow." Past recipients include John Hiatt, John Prine, and Robert Earl Keen.

On February 4, 2023, Williams was honored with the AMERICANAFEST Pre-Grammy Salute to Lucinda Williams, which was held at the Troubadour and live-streamed on Mandolin.com.

On April 4, 2023, Williams announced that her 15th studio album, Stories from a Rock n Roll Heart, would be released on June 30, 2023. The lead single "New York Comeback" was released simultaneously with the album announcement.

It was announced on October 7, 2024, that the seventh volume in Lu's Jukebox series, Lucinda Williams sings the Beatles from Abbey Road, would be released on December 6, 2024. Recorded in the same London studio where the Beatles recorded their 1969 album Abbey Road, the announcement was accompanied by the release of the single "While My Guitar Gently Weeps". A reviewer in Rolling Stone magazine said that in covering the Beatles' music on this album, Williams was one of few who successfully [honored] "the source material, making it uniquely [her] own, and creating something worth hearing".

On October 30, 2025, Williams announced her 16th studio album, World's Gone Wrong, which was released on January 23, 2026. In an article published by the Oxford American, writer Jim Beaugez commented, "World's Gone Wrong articulates the anger, hope, and inspiration she's carried since the protests of her youth, with songs that explore the struggles of race, poverty, and trauma that continue to shadow America today."

On April 27, 2026, The New York Times named Williams one of the "30 Greatest Living American Songwriters", as part of a project compiled with input from hundreds of music industry experts and critics.

== Artistry ==
According to Steve Huey of AllMusic: "The daughter of a well-respected poet, Williams brought a literacy and sense of detail to her music that was unpretentious but powerfully evocative and emotional. [...] As a vocalist, Williams used the rough edges of her instrument to her advantage, allowing the grit to heighten the authenticity of her performance. Early in her career, critics compared Williams to Bob Dylan and Townes Van Zandt, praise that flew in the face of her originality; if she was clearly informed by the blues and the giants of the singer/songwriter community, her execution put her in a class of her own that was beholden to blues, folk, country, and rock without swearing full allegiance to any of them."

== Backing bands ==
From 1985 to 1996, Williams' band included guitarist Gurf Morlix.

From before 2012 into 2022, Williams has called her backing band the Buick 6, whose name was inspired by Bob Dylan's song "From a Buick 6". Since 2012, Buick 6 has been Butch Norton, drums, who joined Williams in 2007; Stuart Mathis, guitar; and David Sutton, bass. Buick 6 has occasionally performed and recorded separately from Williams. For Williams' 2022 tours, Jim Oblon joined on guitar and keyboards.

== Personal life ==
In 1986, Williams married Long Ryders drummer Greg Sowders, but the couple divorced within eighteen months. In September 2009 she married Tom Overby, an executive from Best Buy's music department, who is also her manager. The marriage ceremony was performed on stage at the Minneapolis nightclub First Avenue by her father.

On November 17, 2020, while at her home in Nashville, Williams suffered a stroke. Doctors discovered a blood clot, and she was discharged five weeks later. Though at the time she needed to walk with a cane and could not play guitar, she subsequently recovered enough for her summer 2021 tour with Jason Isbell.

In 2023, Williams released her autobiography titled Don't Tell Anyone the Secrets I Told You: A Memoir. The book details her traumatic childhood, her relationships with her father and mother, and her struggle to forge a sustainable career in the music industry.

== Discography ==
- Ramblin' on My Mind (1979)
- Happy Woman Blues (1980)
- Lucinda Williams (1988)
- Sweet Old World (1992)
- Car Wheels on a Gravel Road (1998)
- Essence (2001)
- World Without Tears (2003)
- West (2007)
- Little Honey (2008)
- Blessed (2011)
- Down Where the Spirit Meets the Bone (2014)
- The Ghosts of Highway 20 (2016)
- This Sweet Old World (2017)
- Vanished Gardens (with Charles Lloyd and the Marvels) (2018)
- Good Souls Better Angels (2020)
- Stories from a Rock n Roll Heart (2023)
- World's Gone Wrong (2026)

== Awards and legacy ==
=== Americana Music Honors and Awards ===
The Americana Music Honors & Awards are presented annually by the Americana Music Association and celebrate outstanding achievement in Americana music. Established in 2002, Williams is one of the most nominated artists in the awards history, with eleven. She has received two awards (one competitive, one honorary).

Americana Awards
Year	Nominated work	Category	Result	Ref.
2003	Herself	Artist of the Year	Nominated	
2003	"Righteously"	Song of the Year	Nominated	
2007	West	Album of the Year	Nominated	
2007	Herself	Artist of the Year	Nominated	
2007	"Are You Alright?"	Song of the Year	Nominated	
2011	Blessed	Album of the Year	Nominated	
2011	Herself	Lifetime Achievement Award (songwriting)	Honored	
2015	Down Where the Spirit Meets the Bone	Album of the Year	Won	
2015	Herself	Artist of the Year	Nominated	
2015	"East Side of Town"	Song of the Year	Nominated	
2016	The Ghosts of Highway 20	Album of the Year	Nominated	
2016	Herself	Artist of the Year	Nominated	

=== Grammy Awards ===
The Grammy Awards are awarded annually by The Recording Academy of the United States for outstanding achievements in the music industry. Often considered the highest music honour, the awards were established in 1958. Williams has received three awards in three separate categories (country, folk and rock), from 18 nominations that span five genres (country, folk, pop, rock, and Americana).

Grammy Awards
Year	Nominated work	Category	Result	Ref.
1994	"Passionate Kisses" (songwriter)	Best Country Song	Won	
1999	"Can't Let Go"	Best Female Rock Vocal Performance	Nominated	
1999	Car Wheels on a Gravel Road	Best Contemporary Folk Album	Won	
2002	"Cold, Cold Heart" (from Timeless: Hank Williams Tribute)	Best Female Country Vocal Performance	Nominated	
2002	"Essence"	Best Female Pop Vocal Performance	Nominated	
2002	"Get Right With God"	Best Female Rock Vocal Performance	Won	
2002	Essence	Best Contemporary Folk Album	Nominated	
2003	"Lately" (from Going Driftless: An Artists' Tribute to Greg Brown)	Best Female Country Vocal Performance	Nominated	
2004	"Righteously"	Best Female Rock Vocal Performance	Nominated	
2004	World Without Tears	Best Contemporary Folk Album	Nominated	
2008	"Come On"	Best Solo Rock Vocal Performance	Nominated	
2008	"Come On"	Best Rock Song	Nominated	
2010	Little Honey	Best Americana Album	Nominated	
2011	"Kiss Like Your Kiss" (from True Blood)	Best Song Written For Motion Picture, Television Or Other Visual Media	Nominated	
2012	Blessed	Best Americana Album	Nominated	
2021	"Man Without A Soul"	Best American Roots Song	Nominated	
2021	Good Souls Better Angels	Best Americana Album	Nominated	
2027	World's Gone Wrong	Best Americana Album	Pending	

=== Other honors and recognitions ===
- 1999 – Ranked No. 97 on VH1's 100 Greatest Women in Rock & Roll.
- 2002 – Named "America's best songwriter" by Time.
- 2002 – Ranked No. 36 on CMT's 40 Greatest Women of Country Music.
- 2015 – Ranked No. 79 on Rolling Stone's 100 Greatest Songwriters of All Time.
- 2017 – Received the Berklee College of Music Honorary Doctorate of Music Degree.
- 2017 – Ranked No. 91 on Rolling Stone's 100 Greatest Country Artists of All Time.
- 2020 – Car Wheels on a Gravel Road ranked No. 97, and Lucinda Williams ranked No. 426, on Rolling Stone's 500 Greatest Albums of All Time.
- 2021 – Inducted into the Austin City Limits Hall of Fame.
- 2021 – "Passionate Kisses" ranked No. 437 on Rolling Stone's 500 Greatest Songs of All Time.
- 2022 – Received the Americana Music Association-UK International Lifetime Achievement Award.
- 2022 – Received the BMI Troubadour Award.
- 2023 – Honored with the AMERICANAFEST Pre-Grammy Salute to Lucinda Williams.
- 2023 – Awarded Best Roots Rock / Americana Artist, and Best Roots Rock / Americana Album (for Stories from a Rock n Roll Heart) in OffBeat's Best of the Beat Awards.
- 2024 – Ranked No. 8 on American Songwriter's list of the 10 Greatest Female Songwriters of All Time.
- 2024 – Elected as a member of the Texas Institute of Letters.
- 2026 – Listed as one of the "30 Greatest Living American Songwriters" by The New York Times.

=== In popular culture ===
- 1991 – "Lucinda Williams" is the title of a song on the Vic Chesnutt album West of Rome.
- 2008 – The American folk/rock band Augustana references the musician in the song "Meet You There", on their album Can't Love, Can't Hurt. The lyrics state "Just put on Lucinda, Baby, and dance with me."
- 2014 – Williams is referenced by the character Kathleen "Kat" Hall, played by Mireille Enos, in the film If I Stay.
- 2019 – The French punk rock band Les Wampas mentions listening to Lucinda WIlliams in the song "C'est politique", on their album Sauvre Le Monde. The lyrics state "J'écoute la RTBF et aussi Lucinda Williams" (I listen to the RTBF and also to Lucinda Williams.)

== See also ==
- Music of Austin
