= Gurf Morlix =

American singer-songwriter

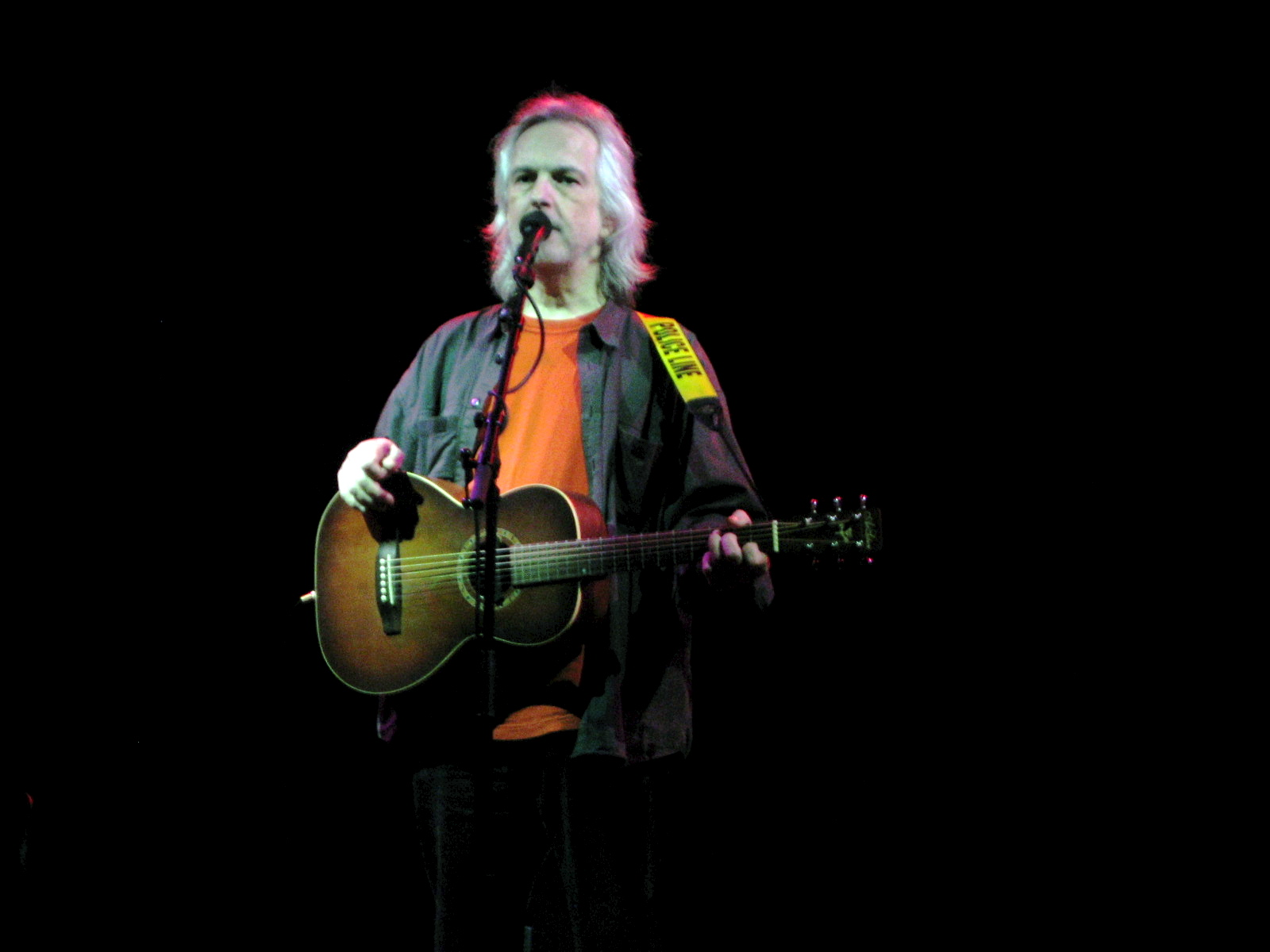

Background information
- Born: 1951 (age 74–75)
- Website: www.gurfmorlix.com

Gurf Morlix (born 1951) is an American singer-songwriter and music producer.

== Career ==
Born in Buffalo, New York, Morlix moved to Texas in 1975 and performed with Blaze Foley. He moved to Los Angeles in 1981 and joined Lucinda Williams's band. He accompanied her from 1985 to 1996 and produced two of her records, Lucinda Williams and its follow-up, Sweet Old World.

Morlix has produced albums for Slaid Cleaves, Mary Gauthier, Robert Earl Keen and Ray Wylie Hubbard, among many others.

== Awards ==
- Member of the Austin Music Awards Hall of Fame (2003–2004)
- Buffalo Music Hall of Fame (2005)
- Americana Music Association Instrumentalist of the Year (2009)

== Discography ==
- Toad of Titicaca (Catamount Records, 2000)
- Fishin' in the Muddy (Catamount Records, 2002)
- Cut 'n Shoot (Blue Corn Music, 2004)
- Diamonds to Dust (Blue Corn Music, 2007)
- Birth to Boneyard (Rootball, 2008), an instrumental version of Diamonds to Dust
- Last Exit to Happyland (Rootball, 2009)
- Blaze Foley's 113th Wet Dream (Rootball, 2011)
- Finds the Present Tense (Rootball, 2013)
- Eatin' At Me (Rootball, 2015)
- The Soul & the Heal (Rootball, February 3, 2017)
- Impossible Blue (Rootball, February 8, 2019)
- Kiss of the Diamondback (Rootball, July 24, 2020)
- The Tightening Of The Screws (Rootball, November 2021)
- Caveman (Rootball, October 2022)
- I Challenge The Beast (Rootball, April 2023)
- Melt Into You ( Rootball, January 2024)
- In Love At Zero Degrees ( Rootball, October 2024)
- A Taste of Ashes ( Rootball, April 2025)
- Bristlecone ( Rootball, October 2025)

Awards
Preceded by Buddy Miller	AMA Instrumentalist of the Year; 2009	Succeeded by Buddy Miller
