= Dusty Wakeman =

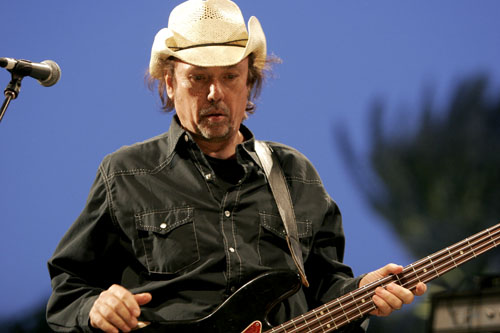
- Dusty Wakeman - Live in Concert

Background information
- Birth name: Donald Wakeman
- Genres: country rock
- Instrument: bass

Donald "Dusty" Wakeman is an American rock/country music producer and engineer based in Burbank, California. Wakeman is also credited as a bass player on many recordings. Dusty has worked with Dwight Yoakam, Lucinda Williams, Jim Lauderdale, Buck Owens, Michelle Shocked, Tom Russell, Roger Clyne and the Peacemakers, Anne McCue, Tony Furtado, Feel, Reacharound, Dieselhed among others. He served as musical director for Gram Parsons: Return to Sin City and for the Sin City All Stars. He is also the owner of Mad Dog Studios, which is now a home studio, and president of Mojave Audio.

He is married to Szu Wang, with two kids, JD Wakeman and Sunny Wakeman.
