= List of UK Country Albums Chart number ones of 2021 =

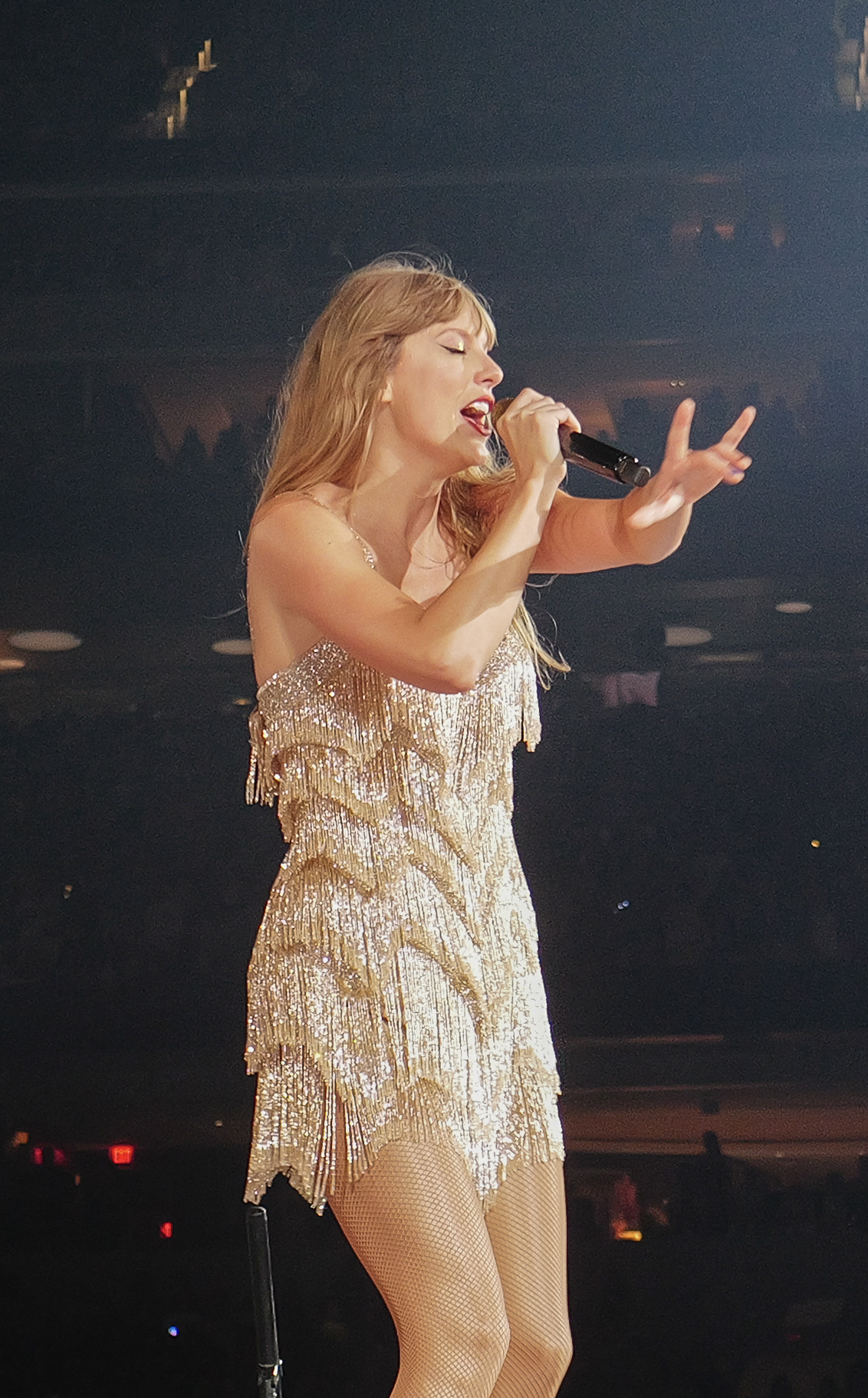
Taylor Swift spent a leading sixteen weeks at number one throughout 2021 with the re-recording of her 2008 album Fearless.

These are the Official Charts Company's UK Country Albums Chart number ones of 2021. The chart week runs from Friday to Thursday with the chart-date given as the following Thursday. Chart positions are based the multi-metric consumption of country music in the United Kingdom, blending traditional album sales, track equivalent albums, and streaming equivalent albums. The chart contains 20 positions.

In the iteration of the chart dated 1 January, Starting Over by Chris Stapleton spent its sixth week at number one, and would remain there for a seventh week before being displaced by Morgan Wallen's Dangerous: The Double Album, which went on to hold the top spot for six consecutive weeks throughout January and February. Following this, Florida Georgia Line earned their first UK Country chart topper with Life Rolls On, the duo's final album before officially disbanding in 2022. Starting Over would then return to the chart peak in March for an eight and, to date, final week. Steve Earle achieved his eleventh number one album with J.T., a tribute to Earle's son Justin, who died in 2020. Taylor Swift released Fearless (Taylor's Version), her highly anticipated re-recording of her second album Fearless, on 9 April and it immediately debuted atop the chart, remaining there for five consecutive weeks. The album would continue to return to number one throughout 2021, spending a total of sixteen weeks at the peak, the most of any other album released this year. On the chart dated 4 June, Blackberry Smoke's You Hear Georgia debuted and spent the next five weeks at the peak before being replaced by Lady A's What a Song Can Do (Chapter One) EP, with the full album also reaching the top spot for two weeks following its release in October. British group The Wandering Hearts spent four weeks at number one with their self-titled release, while Kacey Musgraves' Star-Crossed became her fourth consecutive number one album on the chart. The only other artists to spend multiple weeks in the top spot were Alan Jackson with his twenty-first album Where Have You Gone, and Bobbie Gentry via the release of a compilation album of the reclusive singer's more jazz-oriented recordings titled The Windows of the World. The final number one of the year was Swift's Fearless (Taylor's Version).

== Chart history ==
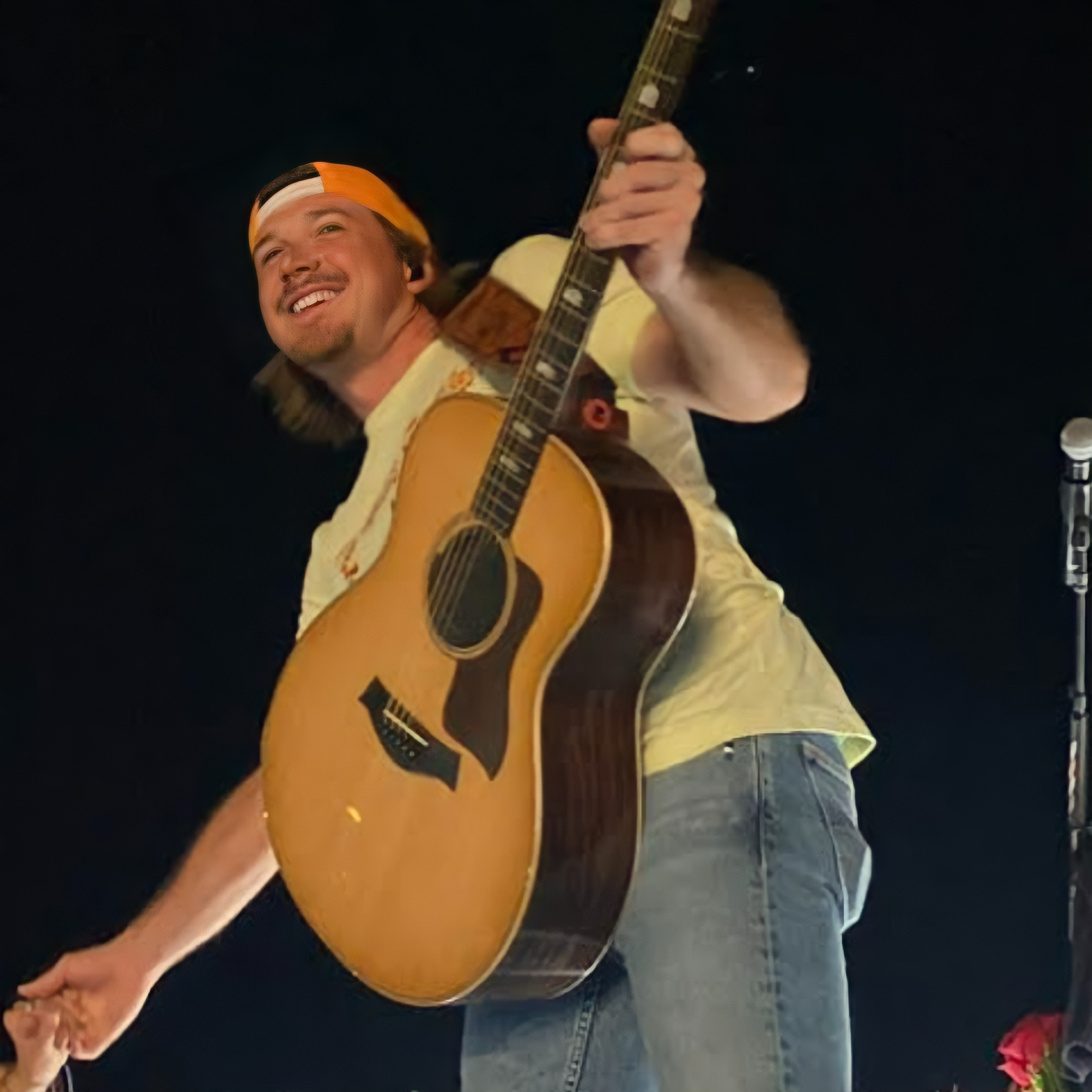
Dangerous, the second album by Morgan Wallen, spent six weeks atop the chart.

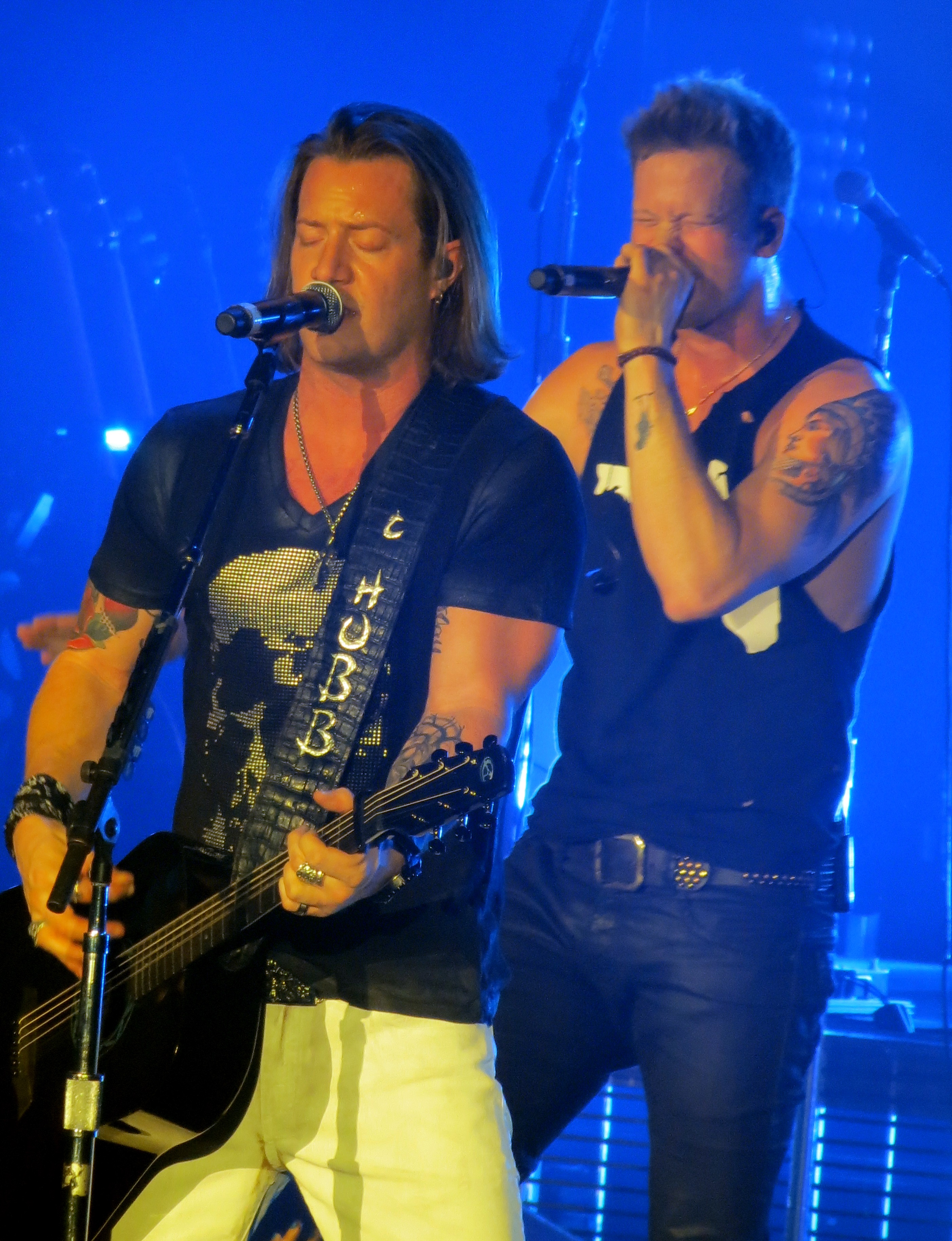
Florida Georgia Line achieved their first chart topping with their fifth and final studio album Life Rolls On.

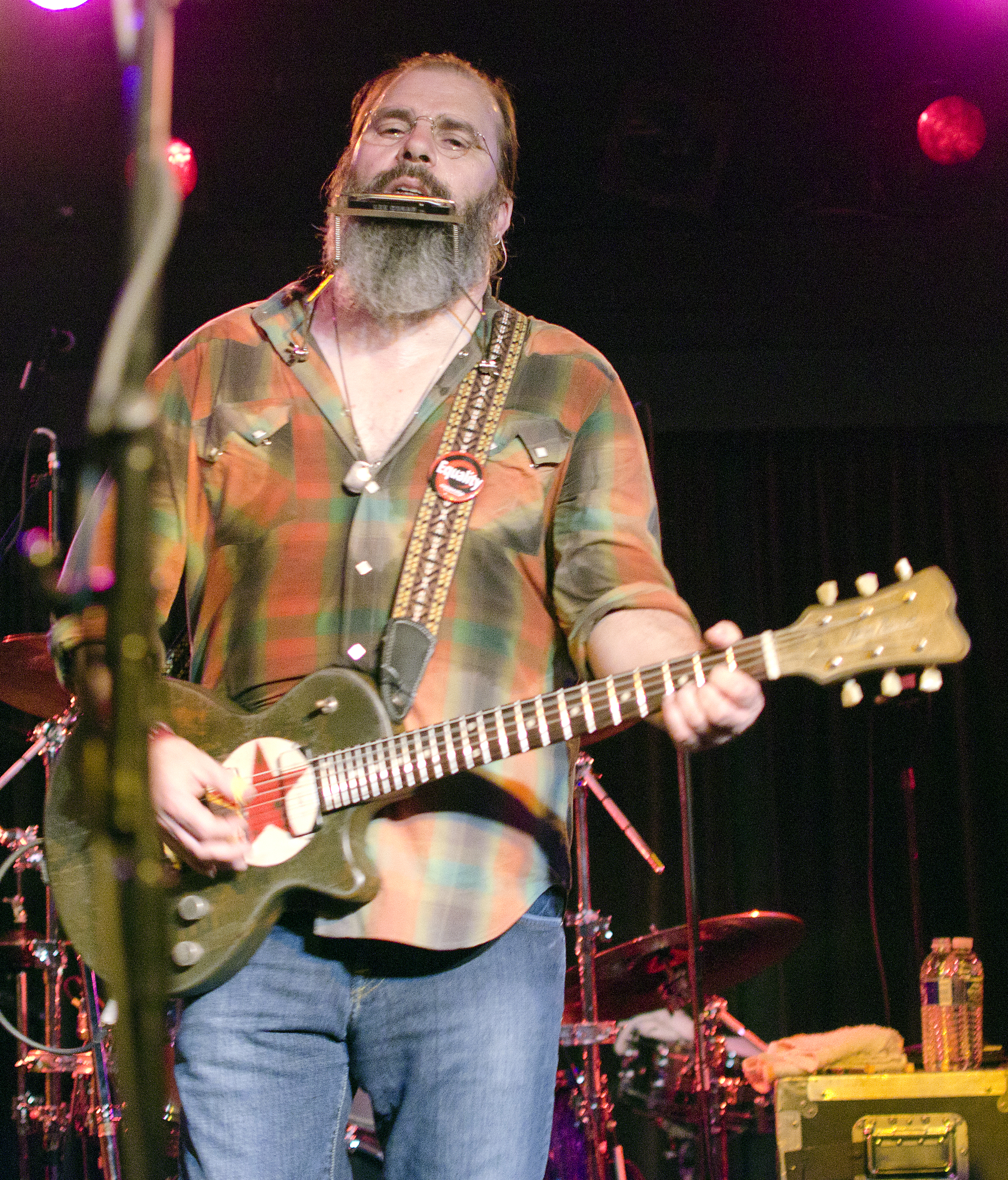
Steve Earle spent two weeks at number one with J.T., a tribute to his son Justin Townes Earle, who passed away in 2020.

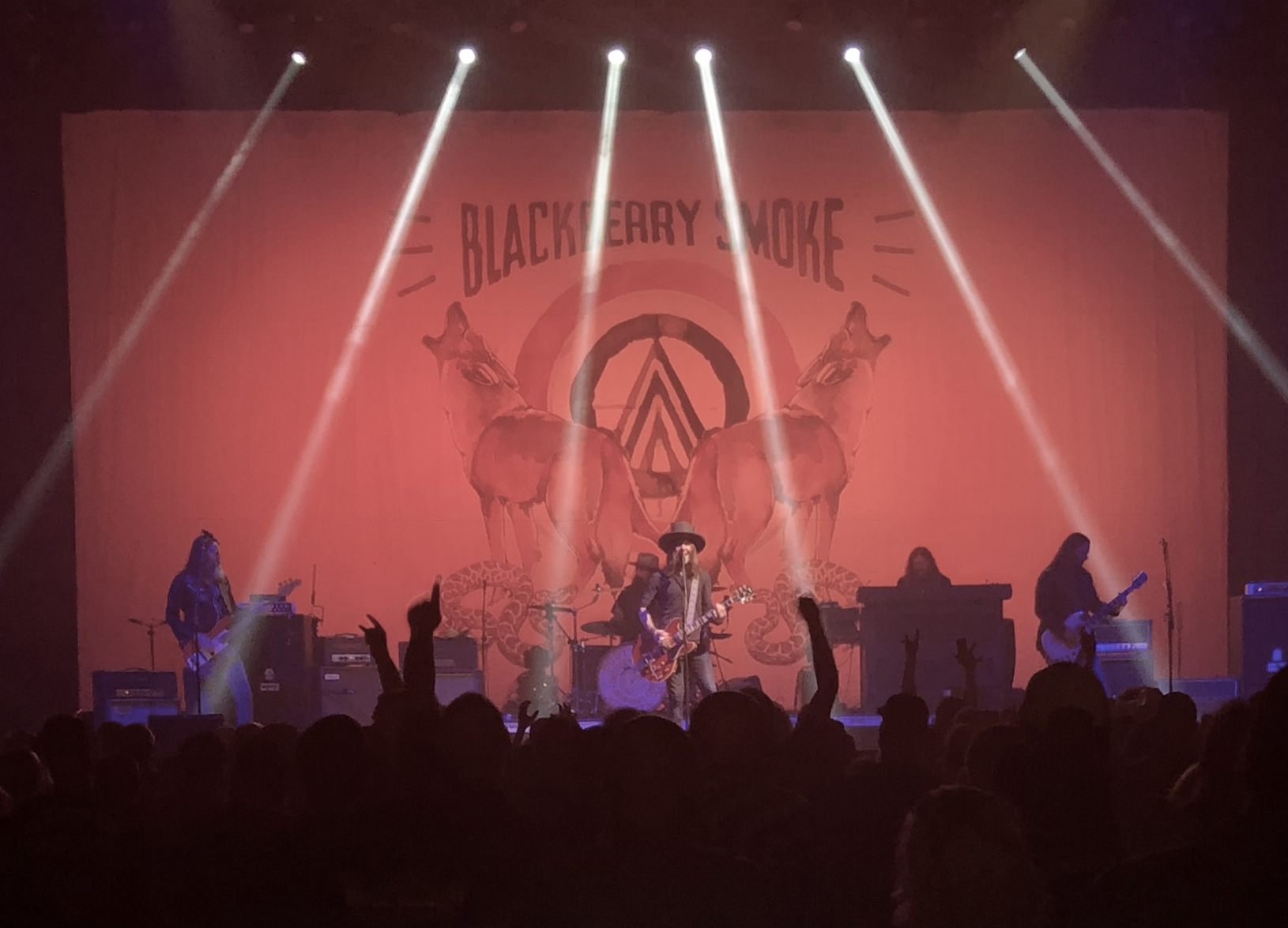
Blackberry Smoke spent five consecutive weeks at number one with You Hear Georgia.

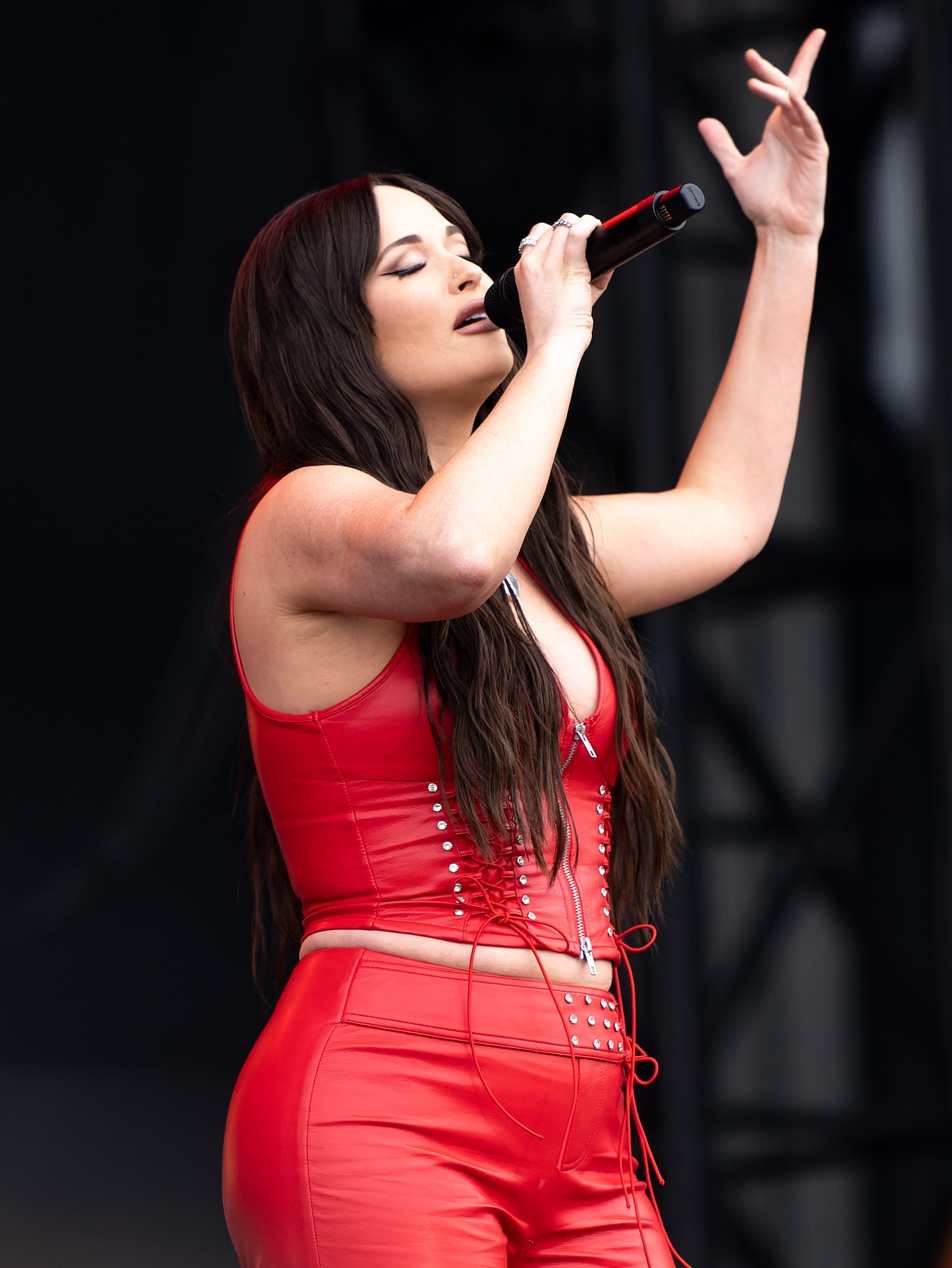
Star-Crossed became Kacey Musgraves' fourth consecutive album to reach number one. It spent three weeks in the top spot.

Issue date	Album	Artist(s)	Record label	Ref.
1 January	Starting Over	Chris Stapleton	Mercury Nashville	
8 January	Starting Over	Chris Stapleton	Mercury Nashville	
15 January	Dangerous: The Double Album	Morgan Wallen	EMI	
22 January	Dangerous: The Double Album	Morgan Wallen	EMI	
29 January	Dangerous: The Double Album	Morgan Wallen	EMI	
5 February	Dangerous: The Double Album	Morgan Wallen	EMI	
12 February	Dangerous: The Double Album	Morgan Wallen	EMI	
19 February	Dangerous: The Double Album	Morgan Wallen	EMI	
26 February	Life Rolls On	Florida Georgia Line	Big Machine	
5 March	Starting Over	Chris Stapleton	Mercury Nashville	
12 March	All the Good Times	Gillian Welch & David Rawlings	Acony	
19 March	That's Life	Willie Nelson	Legacy	
26 March	J.T.	Steve Earle	New West	
2 April	J.T.	Steve Earle	New West	
16 April	Fearless (Taylor's Version)	Taylor Swift	EMI	
23 April	Fearless (Taylor's Version)	Taylor Swift	EMI	
30 April	Fearless (Taylor's Version)	Taylor Swift	EMI	
7 May	Fearless (Taylor's Version)	Taylor Swift	EMI	
14 May	Fearless (Taylor's Version)	Taylor Swift	EMI	
21 May	Where Have You Gone	Alan Jackson	Spinefarm	
28 May	Where Have You Gone	Alan Jackson	Spinefarm	
4 June	You Hear Georgia	Blackberry Smoke	3 Legged	
11 June	You Hear Georgia	Blackberry Smoke	3 Legged	
18 June	You Hear Georgia	Blackberry Smoke	3 Legged	
25 June	You Hear Georgia	Blackberry Smoke	3 Legged	
2 July	You Hear Georgia	Blackberry Smoke	3 Legged	
9 July	What a Song Can Do (Chapter One)	Lady A	Big Machine	
16 July	Fearless (Taylor's Version)	Taylor Swift	EMI	
23 July	The Windows of the World	Bobbie Gentry	UMe	
30 July	The Windows of the World	Bobbie Gentry	UMe	
6 August	Triage	Rodney Crowell	RC1	
13 August	The Wandering Hearts	The Wandering Hearts	Cooking Vinyl	
20 August	The Wandering Hearts	The Wandering Hearts	Cooking Vinyl	
27 August	The Wandering Hearts	The Wandering Hearts	Cooking Vinyl	
3 September	The Horses and the Hounds	James McMurtry	New West	
10 September	The Wandering Hearts	The Wandering Hearts	Cooking Vinyl	
17 September	Star-Crossed	Kacey Musgraves	Interscope	
24 September	Star-Crossed	Kacey Musgraves	Interscope	
1 October	Star-Crossed	Kacey Musgraves	Interscope	
8 October	Fearless (Taylor's Version)	Taylor Swift	EMI	
15 October	Fearless (Taylor's Version)	Taylor Swift	EMI	
22 October	Fearless (Taylor's Version)	Taylor Swift	EMI	
29 October	What a Song Can Do	Lady A	Big Machine	
5 November	What a Song Can Do	Lady A	Big Machine	
12 November	Fearless (Taylor's Version)	Taylor Swift	EMI	
18 November	Fearless (Taylor's Version)	Taylor Swift	EMI	
26 November	Fearless (Taylor's Version)	Taylor Swift	EMI	
3 December	Fearless (Taylor's Version)	Taylor Swift	EMI	
10 December	Little Old Town	Nathan Carter	Sharpe Music	
17 December	Fearless (Taylor's Version)	Taylor Swift	EMI	
24 December	Fearless (Taylor's Version)	Taylor Swift	EMI	
31 December	Fearless (Taylor's Version)	Taylor Swift	EMI	

== Most weeks at number one ==
Weeks at number one	Artist
16	Taylor Swift
6	Morgan Wallen
5	Blackberry Smoke
4	The Wandering Hearts
3	Chris Stapleton
3	Kacey Musgraves
3	Lady A
2	Alan Jackson
2	Bobbie Gentry
2	Steve Earle

== See also ==
- List of UK Albums Chart number ones of 2021
- List of UK Dance Singles Chart number ones of 2021
- List of UK Album Downloads Chart number ones of 2021
- List of UK Independent Albums Chart number ones of 2021
- List of UK R&B Albums Chart number ones of 2021
- List of UK Rock & Metal Albums Chart number ones of 2021
- List of UK Compilation Chart number ones of the 2020s
