= Adam Bednarik =

American music producer

Adam Bednarik (born October 1, 1982) is an American producer, audio engineer, and bassist. He is known for his long-term work with the American singer, songwriter, and guitar player Justin Townes Earle. Bednarik has also worked with artists including Spencer Cullum's Coin Collection, J. D. Simo, William Tyler, Steelism and Carl Broemel of My Morning Jacket, Tchad Blake, Coupler, Kort, Cortney Tidwell, Hands Off Cuba, Meadownoise, Luella and the Sun and Thrift Wig.

Bednarik was the house engineer at the Nashville-based historical House of David Recording Studio from 2002 to 2012.

In 2010, Bednarik recorded, mixed, and produced Behold the Spirit by William Tyler and in 2012 recorded and mixed Wanda Jackson's album Unfinished Business which was produced by Justin Townes Earle.

In 2014 he recorded and co-produced Justin Townes Earle's companion albums, Single Mothers and Absent Fathers. Bednarik also worked in an A&R capacity for Earle's 2017 release, Kids in the Street and later went on to produce, record, and play bass on Earle's eighth album, The Saint of Lost Causes.

In 2019, Bednarik produced the single "Cliff House Kids" for Meadownoise which was released by YK Records.

Bednarik produced, mixed, played bass and created the cover art for JD Simo's album Mind Control that was released in 2021.

In August 2024, a posthumous release of Justin Townes Earle’s All In: Unreleased & Rarities (The New West Years), a compilation of unheard demos and rare material was released on New West Records. It was compiled and Produced by Bednarik and Kim Buie.

== Discography ==
Year	Album	Credits
2024	All In: Unreleased & Rarities (The New West Years)	Producer, engineer, electric bass, upright bass
2021	Spencer Cullum's Coin Collection	Electric bass, upright bass
2019	The Saint of Lost Causes	Producer, engineer, electric bass, upright bass
2017	Kids in the Street	A&R
2016	The Essential Gretchen Peters	Engineer
2015	Absent Fathers	Producer, engineer
2014	Single Mothers	Producer, engineer
2014	Lost in Alphaville	Engineer
2014	Dead Man's Town: A Tribute to Born in the U.S.A.	Engineer, mixing
2012	Unfinished Business	Engineer, mixing
2012	Sing the Delta	Engineer
2012	Pas Tout La	Engineer
2012	Nothing's Gonna Change the Way You Feel About Me Now	Engineer, mixing
2012	Mercyland: Hymns for the Rest of Us	Assistant engineer
2011	Mine Is Yours	Assistant engineer
2011	Invariable Heartache	Upright bass
2011	I Love Tom T. Hall's Songs of Fox Hollow	Mixing
2010	Rain on the City	Assistant engineer
2012	Harlem River Blues	Engineer, mixing
2010	Crows	Assistant engineer
2010	Broken Hearts & Dirty Windows: Songs of John Prine	Engineer, mixing
2010	Behold the Spirit	Producer, engineer, mixing, bass
2010	35 Years Bear Family Records	Engineer
2009	Traces	Engineer
2009	Midnight at the Movies	Engineer
2009	Boys	Upright bass
2008	The Good Life	Engineer, mixing
2008	OH (Ohio)	Assistant engineer
2008	Mission Door	Assistant engineer
2008	Early	Assistant engineer
2007	Topaz City	Engineer
2007	Something in Between	Engineer, mixing
2007	Luminous	Engineer, mixing
2007	Don't Believe a Word	Assistant engineer
2006	The Rockin' Country Piano: Tribute to Toby Keith	Assistant engineer
2006	Pickin' on Josh Turner: The Bluegrass Tribute	Assistant engineer
2006	Pickin' on Billy Currtington	Assistant engineer
2006	My Other Band Vol. 1	Engineer
2006	Human Condition	Engineer
2006	The Beatific Visions	Assistant engineer
2005	Tin Lily	Engineer
2005	The Art of Virtue	Engineer
2005	Palmhenge	Assistant engineer
2005	O Come Look at the Burning	Assistant engineer
2005	Made of Mud	Assistant engineer, bass
2005	John Davis	Assistant engineer
2005	In the Cool	Assistant engineer
2004	Dare to be Small	Assistant engineer, bass
2004	Tumblers and Grit	Assistant engineer
2004	The Portable Kate Campbell	Engineer
2004	Sing Me Out	Assistant engineer
2004	Plow to the End of the Row	Assistant engineer
2004	Pickin' On Trace Adkins: A Bluegrass Tribute	Assistant engineer
2004	A Songwriter's Tribute to George Strait, Vol. 1	Assistant engineer
2002	Freedom's Child	Assistant engineer
2002	What We Lost	Assistant engineer
2002	Pools That Swell with the Rain	Assistant engineer
2021	Mind Control (2021 release)	Producer, mixing, bass, artwork
2002	It Don't Come Easy	Engineer
2002	In the Middle of It	Engineer
