= J.T. (Steve Earle & The Dukes album) =

Studio album by Steve Earle & the Dukes
- Released: January 4, 2021
- Recorded: 2020
- Studios: Electric Lady (New York, New York)
- Length: 34:32
- Label: New West
- Producer: Steve Earle

Steve Earle & the Dukes chronology
Ghosts of West Virginia (2020)	J.T. (2021)	Jerry Jeff (2022)

Professional ratings
Aggregate scores
Source	Rating
AnyDecentMusic?	7.9/10
Metacritic	82/100
Review scores
Source	Rating
American Songwriter	4.5/5 stars
The Arts Desk	4/5 stars
Clash Music	9/10
Exclaim!	9/10
Mojo	4/5 stars
The Observer	4/5 stars
Pitchfork	7.6/10
Spectrum Culture	77%
Uncut	8/10
Under the Radar	7/10

J.T. is a studio album by American rock band Steve Earle & The Dukes. The album is a tribute to Earle's oldest son, Justin Townes Earle, who died of an accidental drug overdose on August 20, 2020. It was released by New West Records on January 4, 2021, on what would have been Justin's 39th birthday. Recording sessions took place at Electric Lady Studios in New York City with Ray Kennedy as audio engineer. Production was handled by Steve Earle himself. At Metacritic, which assigns a normalized rating out of 100 to reviews from mainstream publications, the album received an average score of 82 based on eleven reviews.

== Background ==
Justin Townes Earle released eight albums and an EP over a span of 13 years. Like his father, he struggled with addiction, beginning with heroin use before turning 13. While problems with substance abuse strained their relationship, the father and son appeared to have reconciled more recently, and they spoke on the phone the night Justin died in his Nashville apartment. The cause of death was ruled an accidental overdose of cocaine and the opium derivative fentanyl.

Shortly after Justin's death, Steve Earle began working on an album in his memory. With the help of his 33-year-old son Ian, Earle selected 10 songs from six of Justin's albums. He then booked a week at Jimi Hendrix's Electric Lady Studios in New York City, where he recorded 2020's Ghosts of West Virginia.

Regarding his motivation for recording J.T., Earle wrote in the liner notes, "For better or worse, right or wrong, I loved Justin Townes Earle more than anything else on this earth. That being said, I made this record, like every other record I’ve ever made...for me. It was the only way I knew to say goodbye."

== The songs ==
All of the songs on J.T., except one, were either written or co-written by Justin Townes Earle. Together, they provide an overview of the songwriter's career, featuring both fan favorites and deep cuts.

The opening track, "I Don't Care", is a rocking bluegrass tune that appeared on Justin's EP Yuma in 2007. Four of the songs are taken from his first album, 2008's The Good Life: "Ain't Glad I'm Leaving", "Far Away in Another Town", "Turn Out My Lights", and "Lone Pine Hill". Interspersed between these songs are selections from five subsequent albums: "They Killed John Henry", Midnight at the Movies, 2009; "Harlem River Blues", the title track of his second album, 2010; "Maria", Nothing's Gonna Change the Way You Feel About Me Now, 2012; "Champagne Corolla", Kids in the Street, 2017; and "The Saint of Lost Causes", the title track of his final release, 2019.

"Last Words," the closing track, is the album's only original. Composed by Steve Earle in the weeks following Justin's death, it recounts the last conversation between the two, in the phone call the night he died. The song also reflects on their rocky relationship during times spent together and apart. It closes with their final words to each other: "I love you" and "I love you, too".

== Track listing ==
All songs written by Justin Townes Earle, except where noted.

No.	Title	Writer(s)	Length
1.	"I Don't Care"		1:54
2.	"Ain't Glad I'm Leaving"		2:52
3.	"Maria"		2:46
4.	"Far Away in Another Town"	Justin Townes Earle; Scotty Melton	3:06
5.	"They Killed John Henry"		2:34
6.	"Turn Out My Lights"	Justin Townes Earle; Scotty Melton	2:35
7.	"Lone Pine Hill"		2:43
8.	"Champagne Corolla"		3:35
9.	"The Saint of Lost Causes"		5:01
10.	"Harlem River Blues"		3:10
11.	"Last Words"	Steve Earle	4:21
Total length:			34:32

== Personnel ==
=== Steve Earle & The Dukes ===
- Steve Earle – guitar, mandolin, octave mandolin, harmonica, vocals, producer
- Chris Masterson – guitar, mandolin, one finger piano, vocals
- Eleanor Whitmore – fiddle, mandolin, organ, vocals
- Ricky Ray Jackson – pedal steel guitar, dobro, vocals
- Jeff Hill – acoustic and electric bass, cello, vocals
- Brad Pemberton – drums, percussion, vocals

=== Additional personnel ===
- Ian Dublin Earle – associate producer
- Ray Kennedy – recording, mixing, mastering
- John Rooney – assistant recording
- Laurence Kern – guitar tech
- Tom Bejgrowicz – package design & layout
- Tony Fitzpatrick – cover art
- Danny Clinch – photography
- Shervin Lainez – photography
- Sara Sharpe – photography

== Charts ==
Chart performance for J.T.
Chart (2021)	Peak position
Australian Albums (ARIA)	49
Belgian Albums (Ultratop Flanders)	39
Belgian Albums (Ultratop Wallonia)	157
Dutch Albums (Album Top 100)	43
German Albums (Offizielle Top 100)	48
Scottish Albums (Official Charts)	7
Swiss Albums (Schweizer Hitparade)	37
UK Album Downloads (Official Charts)	48
UK Americana Albums (Official Charts)	4
UK Country Albums (Official Charts)	1
UK Independent Albums (Official Charts)	4
