= Be Right Here =

Be Right Here may refer to:

- Be Right Here (album), a 2024 album by Blackberry Smoke
- "Be Right Here" (song), a 2018 song by Kungs and Stargate
