= The Good Life (Justin Townes Earle album) =

Studio album by Justin Townes Earle
- Released: March 25, 2008
- Recorded: 2007
- Genre: Country
- Length: 30:43
- Label: Bloodshot Records
- Producer: R.S. Field; Steve Poulton

Justin Townes Earle chronology
| Yuma (EP) (2007) | The Good Life (2008) | Midnight at the Movies (2009) |

The Good Life is the debut studio album by Justin Townes Earle, released on March 25, 2008 on Bloodshot Records.

== Critical reception ==
Professional ratings
Aggregate scores
| Source | Rating |
|---|---|
| Metacritic | 67% |
Review scores
| Source | Rating |
| AllMusic | 3.5/5 stars |
| Slant Magazine | 4/5 stars |
| PopMatters | 7/10 stars |

The Good Life received fairly good reviews from music critics. PopMatters' Juli Thanki states in her review that "On his first full length record, The Good Life, Justin Townes Earle delivers the best debut roots music has seen since Old Crow Medicine Show hit the big time with OCMS in 2004".

== Track listing ==
All tracks are written by Justin Townes Earle.

| No. | Title | Length |
|---|---|---|
| 1. | "Hard Livin'" | 2:48 |
| 2. | "The Good Life" | 2:47 |
| 3. | "Who Am I to Say" | 3:08 |
| 4. | "Lone Pine Hill" | 3:03 |
| 5. | "South Georgia Sugar Babe" | 2:47 |
| 6. | "What Do You Do When You're Lonesome" | 3:32 |
| 7. | "Turn Out My Lights" | 3:32 |
| 8. | "Lonesome and You" | 3:29 |
| 9. | "Ain't Glad I'm Leaving" | 2:32 |
| 10. | "Far Away in Another Town" | 3:05 |

== Personnel ==
- Justin Townes Earle – lead vocals, acoustic guitar, harmonica, guitar [tremolo] and baritone guitar
- Bryn Davies – acoustic bass, cello and harmony vocals
- Chris Scruggs – lap steel guitar
- Cory Younts – harmony Vocals, mandolin and harmonica
- Josh Hedley – fiddle, viola and harmony vocals
- Steve Poulton – electric guitar
- Brad Jones – electric bass and organ
- Brian Owings – drums
- Ben Martin – drums
- Keith Brogdon – drums
- Dustin Welch – banjo and backing vocals
- Elliott Currie – backing vocals
- Travis Nicholson – backing vocals
- Amanda Shires - cover model

== Chart performance ==
| Chart (2008) | Peak position |
|---|---|
| US Top Country Albums (Billboard) | 70 |
