= Nothing's Gonna Change the Way You Feel About Me Now =

Studio album by Justin Townes Earle
- Released: March 26, 2012
- Recorded: 2011–12
- Genres: Country; folk; jazz; soul
- Length: 30:22
- Label: Bloodshot
- Producers: Justin Townes Earle, Skylar Wilson

Justin Townes Earle chronology
Harlem River Blues (2010)	Nothing's Gonna Change the Way You Feel About Me Now (2012)	Single Mothers (2014)

Professional ratings
Aggregate scores
Source	Rating
Metacritic	72/100
Review scores
Source	Rating
AllMusic	3/5 stars
Austin Chronicle	4/5 stars
Paste Magazine	(8.8/10)

Nothing's Gonna Change the Way You Feel About Me Now is the fourth studio album by American musician Justin Townes Earle. It was released in March 2012 by Bloodshot Records.

== Track listing ==
All tracks are written by Justin Townes Earle except "Down On The Lower East Side" by Justin Townes Earle and Dustin Welch.

No.	Title	Length
1.	"Am I That Lonely Tonight?"	3:04
2.	"Look the Other Way"	2:29
3.	"Nothing's Gonna Change the Way You Feel About Me Now"	3:04
4.	"Baby's Got a Bad Idea"	2:06
5.	"Maria"	2:35
6.	"Down on the Lower East Side"	3:06
7.	"Won't Be the Last Time"	3:11
8.	"Memphis in the Rain"	2:26
9.	"Unfortunately, Anna"	3:40
10.	"Movin' On"	4:41

== Personnel ==
- Justin Townes Earle – vocals and acoustic guitar
- Skylar Wilson – organ, dream piano, acoustic piano, tambourine and claps
- Paul Niehaus – electric and steel guitar
- Bryn Davies – upright bass and bowed upright bass
- Cory Younts – acoustic guitar, electric piano, percussion, tambourine, harmonica and harmony vocals
- Amanda Shires – harmony vocals and claps
- Vince Ilagan – claps
- Jon-Paul Frappier – trumpet
- Geoff Pfeiffer – saxophone
- Bryan Owings - drums
