= Like an Arrow =

Studio album by Blackberry Smoke
- Released: October 14, 2016
- Genres: Southern rock; hard rock; country rock
- Length: 48:47
- Label: 3 Legged Records
- Producer: Blackberry Smoke

Blackberry Smoke chronology
Holding All the Roses (2015)	Like an Arrow (2016)	Find a Light (2018)

Singles from Like an Arrow
- 1. "Waiting for the Thunder" Released: July 2016

Professional ratings
Aggregate scores
Source	Rating
Metacritic	76/100
Review scores
Source	Rating
AllMusic	4/5 stars
American Songwriter	3.5/5 stars
Classic Rock (magazine)	4/5 stars

Like an Arrow is the fifth studio album by American rock band Blackberry Smoke. The album was self-produced by the band and was released on October 14, 2016.

== Background ==
According to Charlie Starr, they had not intended to make an album when the band began practicing a few new songs he had written when they had a month off in January 2016. The songs came together quickly, so they went to the Quarry Recording Studio outside their hometown of Atlanta and recorded the album. They were not sure who they wanted as producer, but had a clear idea of what they wanted to do with the songs, so they produced the album themselves. The drummer Brit Turner designed the album artwork. The last song on the album, "Free on the Wing", features a duet with Gregg Allman, whom they regarded as an inspiration for the band.

The first track of the album, "Waiting for the Thunder", was released as the lead single from the album.

== Reception ==
The album received a Metacritic rating of 76 based on 6 reviews, indicating generally favorable reviews.

The album debuted at No. 12 on Billboard 200, No. 3 on Top Rock Albums, and No. 1 on both the Top Country Albums and Americana/Folk Albums charts. It sold 18,000 copies in its first sales week, and a further 4,200 in its second week. The album had sold 48,000 copies as of August 2017.

The album debuted at No. 8 on the UK Albums chart, as well as No. 1 on UK Independent Albums, Americana Albums, and Rock & Metal Albums charts.

== Track listing ==
No.	Title	Writer(s)	Length
1.	"Waiting for the Thunder"	Charlie Starr	4:07
2.	"Let It Burn"	Starr	2:56
3.	"The Good Life"	Starr, Travis Meadows	3:59
4.	"What Comes Naturally"	Starr	4:21
5.	"Running Through Time"	Starr, Meadows	4:44
6.	"Like an Arrow"	Starr	4:24
7.	"Ought to Know"	Starr	4:16
8.	"Sunrise in Texas"	Blackberry Smoke, Michael Tolcher	4:36
9.	"Ain't Gonna Wait"	Starr	3:38
10.	"Workin' for a Workin' Man"	Starr	2:59
11.	"Believe You Me"	Starr	2:59
12.	"Free on the Wing"	Starr, Brandon Still	5:48
Total length:			48:47

== Personnel ==
Blackberry Smoke

- Charlie Starr — lead vocals, electric guitar; pedal steel guitar (track 3), acoustic guitar (tracks 5, 7, 9), Dobro (track 8), mandolin (track 9)
- Paul Jackson — electric guitar (all but track 4), backing vocals; acoustic guitar (track 4)
- Brandon Still — B3 organ (tracks 1, 5–8, 10, 11), piano (tracks 2–4, 7), electric piano (track 5, 6, 8, 9, 12), accordion (track 9), clavinet (track 11)
- Richard Turner — bass (tracks 1–3, 5–12), upright bass guitar (track 4)
- Brit Turner — drums, percussion

Additional personnel

- Benji Shanks — slide guitar (track 4), electric guitar (track 11)
- Gregg Allman — co-lead vocals (track 12)

== Charts ==
=== Weekly charts ===
Chart (2016)	Peak position
Belgian Albums (Ultratop Flanders)	104
Belgian Albums (Ultratop Wallonia)	40
Dutch Albums (Album Top 100)	86
French Albums (SNEP)	129
German Albums (Offizielle Top 100)	31
Irish Albums (IRMA)	100
Scottish Albums (Official Charts)	3
Swedish Albums (Sverigetopplistan)	27
Swiss Albums (Schweizer Hitparade)	44
UK Albums (Official Charts)	8
UK Album Downloads (Official Charts)	13
UK Americana Albums (Official Charts)	1
UK Independent Albums (Official Charts)	1
UK Rock & Metal Albums (Official Charts)	1
US Billboard 200	12
US Top Country Albums (Billboard)	1
US Americana/Folk Albums (Billboard)	1
US Independent Albums (Billboard)	2
US Top Rock Albums (Billboard)	3
US Indie Store Album Sales (Billboard)	7
US Vinyl Albums (Billboard)	11

=== Year-end charts ===
Chart (2016)	Position
US Top Country Albums (Billboard)	70
