= Holding All the Roses =

Studio album by Blackberry Smoke
- Released: February 10, 2015
- Genres: Southern rock; country rock
- Length: 40:39
- Label: Rounder
- Producer: Brendan O'Brien

Blackberry Smoke chronology
The Whippoorwill (2012)	Holding All the Roses (2015)	Like An Arrow (2016)

Singles from Holding All the Roses
- 1. "Living in the Song" Released: February 9, 2015

Professional ratings
Aggregate scores
Source	Rating
Metacritic	76/100
Review scores
Source	Rating
AllMusic	4/5 stars

Holding All the Roses is the fourth studio album by American rock band Blackberry Smoke. It was released on February 10, 2015, via Rounder. The title track was featured in Madden NFL 16

== Reception ==
The album has been given a Metacritic rating of 76 based on 9 reviews, indicating generally favorable reviews.

The album debuted at No. 1 on the Top Country Albums chart, and No. 29 on the Billboard 200, selling 19,200 copies for the week. The album has sold 49,600 copies in the US as of September 2015.

== Track listing ==
All tracks are written by Charlie Starr except "Lay It All on Me", written by Starr and Travis Meadows.

No.	Title	Length
1.	"Let Me Help You (Find the Door)"	3:04
2.	"Holding All the Roses"	3:16
3.	"Living in the Song"	3:24
4.	"Rock and Roll Again"	2:48
5.	"Woman in the Moon"	4:37
6.	"Too High"	3:12
7.	"Wish in One Hand"	3:08
8.	"Randolph County Farewell"	1:17
9.	"Payback's a Bitch"	4:19
10.	"Lay It All on Me"	3:10
11.	"No Way Back to Eden"	4:35
12.	"Fire in the Hole"	3:47
Total length:		40:39

== Personnel ==
- Charlie Starr – lead vocals, guitar, pedal steel, banjo
- Richard Turner – bass guitar, vocals
- Paul Jackson – guitar, vocals
- Brandon Still – piano, organ
- Brit Turner – drums, percussion

== Charts ==
=== Weekly charts ===
Chart (2015)	Peak position
Austrian Albums (Ö3 Austria)	52
Belgian Albums (Ultratop Flanders)	112
Belgian Albums (Ultratop Wallonia)	70
French Albums (SNEP)	137
German Albums (Offizielle Top 100)	32
Dutch Albums (Album Top 100)	48
Norwegian Albums (VG-lista)	34
Scottish Albums (Official Charts)	10
Swedish Albums (Sverigetopplistan)	15
Swiss Albums (Schweizer Hitparade)	24
UK Albums (Official Charts)	17
UK Album Downloads (Official Charts)	27
UK Independent Albums (Official Charts)	3
UK Rock & Metal Albums (Official Charts)	1
US Billboard 200	29
US Top Country Albums (Billboard)	1
US Top Rock Albums (Billboard)	7

=== Year-end charts ===
Chart (2015)	Position
US Top Country Albums (Billboard)	64
