= Midnight at the Movies =

Studio album by Justin Townes Earle
- Released: March 3, 2009
- Recorded: 2008–09
- Genres: Americana; country; bluegrass
- Length: 32:41
- Label: Bloodshot Records
- Producers: R.S. Field; Steve Poulton

Justin Townes Earle chronology
The Good Life (2008)	Midnight at the Movies (2009)	Harlem River Blues (2010)

Midnight at the Movies is the second studio album by Justin Townes Earle, released on March 3, 2009 on Bloodshot Records.

== Critical reception ==
Professional ratings
Aggregate scores
Source	Rating
Metacritic	82/100
Review scores
Source	Rating
AllMusic	3.5/5 stars
The Austin Chronicle	3.5/5 stars
Los Angeles Times	3.5/4 stars
Mojo	4/5 stars
Paste	9.2/10
Q	4/5 stars
PopMatters	7/10
Slant Magazine	3.5/5 stars
Uncut	4/5 stars
Under the Radar	8/10

Midnight at the Movies received generally favorable reviews from music critics.

== Track listing ==
All tracks are written by Justin Townes Earle except "Can't Hardly Wait" which was written by Paul Westerberg.

No.	Title	Length
1.	"Midnight at the Movies"	3:22
2.	"What I Mean to You"	2:57
3.	"They Killed John Henry"	2:46
4.	"Mama's Eyes"	2:18
5.	"Dirty Rag"	0:34
6.	"Can't Hardly Wait"	2:48
7.	"Black Eyed Suzy"	2:19
8.	"Poor Fool"	2:59
9.	"Halfway to Jackson"	3:28
10.	"Someday I'll Be Forgiven for This"	3:00
11.	"Walk Out"	2:06
12.	"Here We Go Again"	4:04

== Personnel ==
- Justin Townes Earle – lead vocals, acoustic guitar and resonator
- Bryn Davies – bass and harmony vocals
- Pete Finney – steel guitar and dobro
- Josh Hedley – fiddle
- Brian Owings – drums
- Steve Poulton – vibraphone, producer
- Skylar Wilson – bandleader, piano, organ, wurlitzer and vibraphone
- Cory Younts – banjo, mandolin, harmonica, harmony vocals, piano and whistling
- R.S. Field - producer
- Adam Bednarik - recording engineer
- Richard McLaurin - mixing
- Brenton Stanley - assistant engineer
- Jim Demain - mastering
- Joshua Black Wilkins - photography
