= Harlem River Blues =

Studio album by Justin Townes Earle
- Released: September 14, 2010
- Recorded: 2009
- Genre: Country
- Length: 31:22
- Label: Bloodshot Records
- Producer: Justin Townes Earle; Skylar Wilson

Justin Townes Earle chronology
Midnight at the Movies (2009)	Harlem River Blues (2010)	Nothing's Gonna Change the Way You Feel About Me Now (2012)

Harlem River Blues is Justin Townes Earle's third studio album, released on September 14, 2010, on Bloodshot Records.

Professional ratings
Aggregate scores
Source	Rating
Metacritic	83/100
Review scores
Source	Rating
AllMusic	4/5 stars
American Songwriter	4.5/5 stars
The A.V. Club	B
The Boston Phoenix	3/4 stars
Mojo	4/5 stars
PopMatters	8/10
Q	4/5 stars
Slant Magazine	4/5 stars
The Telegraph	4/5 stars
Uncut	4/5 stars

== Track listing ==
All tracks are written by Justin Townes Earle except "Rogers Park," which was written by Justin Townes Earle and Scotty Melton.

No.	Title	Length
1.	"Harlem River Blues"	2:49
2.	"One More Night in Brooklyn"	3:04
3.	"Move over Mama"	2:01
4.	"Workin' for the MTA"	3:49
5.	"Wanderin'"	2:38
6.	"Slippin' and Slidin'"	2:58
7.	"Christchurch Woman"	4:11
8.	"Learning to Cry"	2:41
9.	"Ain't Waitin'"	2:16
10.	"Rogers Park"	4:28
11.	"Harlem River Blues Reprise"	0:32

== Personnel ==
- Justin Townes Earle – vocals, acoustic guitar, claps and choir vocals
- Skylar Wilson – organ, electric piano, vibes, percussion, synth and claps
- Bryn Davies – upright bass, cello, bowed bass, harmony and choir vocals
- Jason Isbell – electric guitar and choir vocals
- Brian Owings – drums and percussion
- Josh Hedley – violins, fiddles, claps, harmony and choir vocals
- Paul Niehaus – steel guitar
- Ketch Secor – harmonica
- Phil Lassiter – trumpet
- Jeff Coffin – saxophone
- Caitlin Rose – choir vocals
- Jordan Caress – choir vocals
- Alex Caress – choir vocals
- Rayland Baxter – choir vocals
- Black Wilkins – claps
