= Find a Light =

Studio album by Blackberry Smoke
- Released: April 6, 2018
- Genre: Southern rock; country rock
- Length: 53:44
- Label: 3 Legged Records
- Producer: Blackberry Smoke

Blackberry Smoke chronology
Like an Arrow (2016)	Find a Light (2018)	You Hear Georgia (2021)

Find a Light is the sixth studio album by American rock band Blackberry Smoke. The album was self-produced by the band and it was released on April 6, 2018.

== Critical reception ==
Professional ratings
Aggregate scores
Source	Rating
Metacritic	72/100
Review scores
Source	Rating
AllMusic	4/5 stars
PopMatters	8/10 stars

Find a Light has received largely positive reviews from professional music critics, and has an overall Metacritic rating of 72 based on 4 critics, indicating "generally favorable reviews".

== Commercial performance ==
The album debuted at No. 3 on the Top Country Albums chart, N. 2 on Americana/Folk Albums, and No. 31 on the Billboard 200, selling 9,000 copies (16,000 equivalent album units) in the first week. It has sold 31,300 copies in the United States as of November 2018.

== Track listing ==
Find a Light track listing
No.	Title	Writer(s)	Length
1.	"Flesh and Bone"	Charlie Starr	4:32
2.	"Run Away From it All"	K. Nelson, Starr	4:29
3.	"The Crooked Kind"	Starr	3:40
4.	"Medicate my Mind"	T. Meadows, Starr	4:42
5.	"I've Got This Song"	Starr	4:52
6.	"Best Seat in the House"	K. Nelson, Starr	4:25
7.	"I'll Keep Ramblin'"	R. Randolph, Starr	5:37
8.	"Seems so Far"	T. Meadows, Starr	4:01
9.	"Lord Strike Me Dead"	Starr	3:43
10.	"Let Me Down Easy"	K. Nelson, Starr	2:57
11.	"Nobody Gives a Damn"	K. Nelson, Starr	3:22
12.	"Till the Wheels Fall Off"	Starr	3:47
13.	"Mother Mountain"	Starr	3:39
Total length:			53:44

== Personnel ==
=== Blackberry Smoke ===
- Charlie Starr – lead vocals, guitar, pedal steel, banjo
- Richard Turner – bass guitar, vocals
- Paul Jackson – guitar, vocals
- Brandon Still – piano, organ
- Brit Turner – drums, percussion

=== Other Musicians ===
"With Our Friends"

- Robert Randolph - pedal steel guitar
- Benji Shanks - 12-string guitar, dobro
- Levi Lowrey - fiddle
- Gaurav Malhotra - congas
- Amanda Shires - vocals
- Oliver Wood - vocals
- Chris Wood - vocals

"The Black Bettys"

- Sherie Murphy - vocals
- Sherita Murphy - vocals

== Charts ==
Chart performance for Find a Light
Chart (2018)	Peak position
Austrian Albums (Ö3 Austria)	25
Belgian Albums (Ultratop Flanders)	90
Belgian Albums (Ultratop Wallonia)	35
Dutch Albums (Album Top 100)	115
German Albums (Offizielle Top 100)	21
Spanish Albums (Promusicae)	58
Swedish Albums (Sverigetopplistan)	26
Swiss Albums (Schweizer Hitparade)	25
UK Albums (OCC)	12
US Billboard 200	31
US Americana/Folk Albums (Billboard)	2
US Independent Albums (Billboard)	2
US Top Country Albums (Billboard)	3
US Indie Store Album Sales (Billboard)	6
