= Ghosts of West Virginia =

Studio album by Steve Earle
- Released: May 22, 2020
- Studio: Electric Lady (New York City)
- Length: 29:46
- Label: New West

Steve Earle chronology
Guy (2019)	Ghosts of West Virginia (2020)	J.T. (2021)

Professional ratings
Aggregate scores
Source	Rating
AnyDecentMusic?	7.7/10
Metacritic	82/100
Review scores
Source	Rating
AllMusic	4.5/5 stars
American Songwriter	4/5 stars
Classic Rock	4/5 stars
Exclaim!	8/10
Rolling Stone	3.5/5 stars

Ghosts of West Virginia is the twentieth studio album by American country musician Steve Earle, credited to Steve Earle and the Dukes. It was released on May 22, 2020, under New West Records. Most of the songs were written for the off-Broadway play Coal Country about the Upper Big Branch Mine disaster in 2010. Earle collaborated on the play written by Jessica Blank and Erik Jensen, drawing on interviews with survivors and families of the miners.

== Critical reception ==
Ghosts of West Virginia was met with "universal acclaim" reviews from critics. At Metacritic, which assigns a weighted average rating out of 100 to reviews from mainstream publications, this release received an average score of 82, based on 10 reviews.

=== Accolades ===
Accolades for Ghosts of West Virginia
Publication	Accolade	Rank	Ref.
Rolling Stone	Rolling Stone's 50 Best Albums of 2020 – Mid-Year	47	

== Track listing ==
Ghosts of West Virginia track listing
No.	Title	Length
1.	"Heaven Ain't Goin' Nowhere"	1:39
2.	"Union, God and Country"	2:23
3.	"Devil Put the Coal in the Ground"	2:53
4.	"John Henry Was a Steel Drivin’ Man"	3:28
5.	"Time is Never on Our Side"	2:55
6.	"It's About Blood"	4:33
7.	"If I Could See Your Face Again"	2:57
8.	"Black Lung"	3:19
9.	"Fastest Man Alive"	2:51
10.	"The Mine"	2:48

== Charts ==
Chart performance for Ghosts of West Virginia
Chart (2020)	Peak position
Scottish Albums (OCC)	7
Swiss Albums (Schweizer Hitparade)	33
UK Albums (OCC)	61
UK Americana Albums (OCC)	1
UK Country Albums (OCC)	5
UK Independent Albums (OCC)	5
US Folk Albums (Billboard)	8
US Independent Albums (Billboard)	36
US Top Album Sales (Billboard)	7
US Top Country Albums (Billboard)	44
US Top Rock Albums (Billboard)	48
