= Like a Lady (Lady A song) =

Single by Lady A

from the album What a Song Can Do
- Released: March 15, 2021
- Genre: Country
- Length: 3:01
- Label: Big Machine
- Songwriters: Hillary Scott; Dave Barnes; Michelle Buzz; Martin Johnson; Brandon Paddock
- Producers: Dann Huff; Martin Johnson; Brandon Paddock

Lady A singles chronology
"Champagne Night" (2020)	"Like a Lady" (2021)	"What a Song Can Do" (2022)

Music video
- "Like a Lady" on YouTube

"Like a Lady" is a song by American country music group Lady A. It is the lead single to their ninth studio album What a Song Can Do. Group member Hillary Scott co-wrote the song with Dave Barnes, Michelle Buzz, Martin Johnson, and Brandon Paddock, the last two of whom co-produced with Dann Huff.

== Content ==
Group member Hillary Scott co-wrote the song with Dave Barnes, Michelle Buzz, Martin Johnson, and Brandon Paddock. Scott described the song as being inspired by Dolly Parton's "9 to 5" and Shania Twain's "Man! I Feel Like a Woman!" in terms of being an up-tempo anthem with a theme of female empowerment. The song features Scott on lead vocals, with Charles Kelley and Dave Haywood providing vocal harmony and guitar work. Ilya Toshinsky performs banjo and mandolin on the song, and Stuart Duncan plays fiddle.

== Critical reception ==
Angela Stefano of Taste of Country wrote that the song was "a big ol' slice of girl power". Writing for the same site, Cillea Hougton stated that "The summery track ditches the polite standards associated with the phrase the song is named after, instead following a single woman for a night on the town where she treats herself to the highest liquor on the shelf and dances like no one’s watching." CMT writer Jessica Nicholson called the song's guitar work "'80s inspired". Kevin John Coyne of Country Universe was less favorable toward the track, calling it a "assembled from spare parts and assembled on the backs of other women who have done the work." He also criticized the band for "build[ing] an entire song around the name [they] have stolen from a black woman".

== Charts ==
=== Weekly charts ===
Weekly chart performance for "Like a Lady"
Chart (2021)	Peak position
Australia Country Hot 50 (TMN)	31
Canada (Canadian Hot 100)	94
Canada Country (Billboard)	4
US Billboard Hot 100	85
US Country Airplay (Billboard)	13
US Hot Country Songs (Billboard)	20

=== Year-end charts ===
Year-end chart performance for "Like a Lady"
Chart (2021)	Position
US Country Airplay (Billboard)	44
US Hot Country Songs (Billboard)	71

== Certifications ==
Certifications and sales for "Like a Lady"
Region	Certification	Certified units/sales
Canada (Music Canada)	Gold	40,000^{‡}
^{‡} Sales+streaming figures based on certification alone.
