= The Whippoorwill =

Studio album by Blackberry Smoke
- Released: August 14, 2012 (US), February 17, 2014 (Europe)
- Recorded: July 21 – August 4, 2011
- Genres: Southern rock; hard rock; country rock; roots rock
- Length: 54:29
- Labels: Southern Ground, Earache Records
- Producers: Blackberry Smoke, Clay Cook, Matt Mangano and Zac Brown.

Blackberry Smoke chronology
Little Piece of Dixie (2009)	The Whippoorwill (2012)	Holding All the Roses (2015)

Singles from The Whippoorwill
- 1. "Pretty Little Lie" Released: January 28, 2013; 2. "Ain't Much Left of Me" Released: July 15, 2013

Professional ratings
Review scores
Source	Rating
AllMusic	3.5/5 stars
The Guardian	4/5 stars

The Whippoorwill is the third studio album by American rock band Blackberry Smoke. It was released on August 14, 2012, through Southern Ground Records in the North America and on February 17, 2014, through Earache Records in Europe. The latter contained three additional live tracks; "Country Side of Life", "Pretty Little Lie" and "Six Ways to Sunday".

== Track listing ==
No.	Title	Written by	Length
1.	"Six Ways to Sunday"	Charlie Starr	3:27
2.	"Pretty Little Lie"	Travis Meadows, Starr	3:34
3.	"Everybody Knows She's Mine"	Starr	3:49
4.	"One Horse Town"	Meadows, Jeremy Spillman, Starr	4:16
5.	"Ain't Much Left of Me"	David Lee Murphy, Blackberry Smoke	4:58
6.	"The Whippoorwill"	Starr	5:31
7.	"Lucky Seven"	Meadows, Blackberry Smoke	4:17
8.	"Leave a Scar"	Meadows, Starr	3:34
9.	"Crimson Moon"	Zac Brown, Matt Mangano, Starr	4:00
10.	"Ain't Got the Blues"	Starr	4:03
11.	"Sleeping Dogs"	Gordon Kennedy, Blackberry Smoke	3:22
12.	"Shakin' Hands with the Holy Ghost"	Starr	3:45
13.	"Up the Road"	Starr	5:53

== Personnel ==
Blackberry Smoke

- Charlie Starr – lead vocals, guitar, pedal steel, banjo
- Richard Turner – bass guitar, vocals
- Paul Jackson – guitar, vocals
- Brandon Still – piano, organ
- Brit Turner – drums, percussion

Additional musicians

- Clay Cook – percussion, harmonium (4)
- Matt Mangano – acoustic guitar (4)
- Maureen Murphy, Lo Carter, Kyla Jade – backing vocals (3, 9, 12, 13)
- Sarah Dugas – backing vocals (9)
- Arnold McCuller – backing vocals (6, 10, 13)
- Brendan Wallace – bagpipes

Production

- Blackberry Smoke, Clay Cook, Matt Mangano, Zac Brown – producers
- Matt Wallace, Mike Fraser – mixing
- Stephen Marcussen – mastering
- Trey Wilson – production coordinator
- Brit Turner – art direction
- Justin Helton, Tim Pederson – cover design
- David Stuart – photography

== Chart performance ==
The album debuted on the Top Country Albums chart at No. 59 before their album's official release in August 2012, and re-entered the chart 4 weeks later at No.8 on its official release (chart date September 1, 2012). It also debuted on Billboard 200 at No. 40 on its official release, as well as No. 10 on the Independent Albums chart and No. 12 on the Top Rock Albums chart. The album has sold 51,000 copies in the US as of October 2012.

The album was released in the UK in February 2014, and it debuted at No.30 on the UK album Top 100 chart and No. 1 on the UK Country Album Chart with 2,973 copies sold for the week.

=== Album ===
Chart (2012–2014)	Peak position
German Albums (Offizielle Top 100)	97
Scottish Albums (Official Charts)	20
UK Albums (Official Charts)	30
UK Album Downloads (Official Charts)	77
UK Independent Albums (Official Charts)	5
UK Rock & Metal Albums (Official Charts)	2
US Billboard 200	40
US Top Country Albums (Billboard)	8
US Heatseekers Albums (Billboard)	30
US Independent Albums (Billboard)	10
US Top Rock Albums (Billboard)	12

=== Singles ===
Year	Single	Peak positions
Year	Single	US Country Airplay
2013	"Pretty Little Lie"	46
2013	"Ain't Much Left of Me"	—
"—" denotes releases that did not chart
