= Kids in the Street (Justin Townes Earle album) =

Studio album by Justin Townes Earle
- Released: May 26, 2017
- Recorded: 2017
- Studios: ARC Studios; Omaha, Nebraska
- Genre: Country
- Length: 42:46
- Label: New West Records
- Producer: Mike Mogis

Justin Townes Earle chronology
Absent Fathers (2015)	Kids in the Street (2017)	The Saint of Lost Causes (2019)

Singles from Kids in the Street
- 1. "Champagne Corolla" Released: March 2, 2017

Kids in the Street is the seventh studio album by Justin Townes Earle, released on May 26, 2017 on New West Records. It is the first album Earle recorded outside of his hometown of Nashville; Kids in the Street was recorded with first-time collaborator and producer Mike Mogis at ARC Studios in Omaha, Nebraska. The album is the third and final part of a trilogy, following Earle's Single Mothers (2014) and Absent Fathers (2015). Kids in the Street is Earle's first release on New West Records. The first single from the album was "Champagne Corolla", featuring a lyric video directed by Tom Kirk.

Earle noted the upbeat tone of the album, saying in an interview that he "got married and am getting ready to become a father ... this is the first record that I've written since I've been married. There's definitely an uplifting aspect to this record in a lot of ways, because I'm feeling pretty positive ... this record's more about looking outward on what's happening, and writing about subjects like gentrification and inner city strife. [Kids in the Street] also has more of a soul influence to it, and it's got a deeper connection to the blues than anything I've done before."

== Critical reception ==
Professional ratings
Aggregate scores
Source	Rating
Metacritic	78%
Review scores
Source	Rating
The Guardian	3/5 stars
Rolling Stone	3.5/5 stars
NPR	positive
New Noise	5/5 stars
Blurt	4/5 stars
Paste	8.7/10
Glide Magazine	positive

Kids in the Street received fairly positive reviews from music critics. Rolling Stone gave the album three-and-a-half stars out of five, writing that the album "always feels organic, never mannered ... Earle [waxes] nostalgic for a childhood in the 1990s with a timelessness that could conjure the 1890s just as well". The Guardian noted a "quiet contentment" in the music, instead of the "bleakness" found on Single Mothers and Absent Fathers. NPR credited Mike Mogis's production for adding "appealingly unexpected textures" to the songs, while Paste Magazine said that Earle "walk[s] the line between tradition and his own modernity". New Noise praised the album's "versatile offering of country, folk, blues, jazz[,] and soulful rock". Blurt wrote that Kids in the Street is "just as charming and powerful as [Single Mothers and Absent Fathers]".

== Track listing ==
All tracks are written by Justin Townes Earle.

No.	Title	Length
1.	"Champagne Corolla"	3:38
2.	"Maybe A Moment"	3:06
3.	"What's She Crying For"	3:54
4.	"15-25"	4:03
5.	"Kids in the Street"	3:53
6.	"Faded Valentine"	3:45
7.	"What's Goin' Wrong"	3:25
8.	"Short Hair Woman"	2:50
9.	"Same Old Stagolee" (version of "Stagger Lee")	3:42
10.	"If I Was the Devil"	2:35
11.	"Trouble Is"	3:22
12.	"There Go a Fool"	4:33

== Personnel ==
=== Main band ===
- Justin Townes Earle – vocals, guitar
- Scott Seiver – drums, percussion, claps
- Paul Niehaus – electric guitar, baritone guitar, pedal steel
- Max Stehr – upright bass
- Ben Brodin – piano, electric piano, Hammond B-3 organ, pump organ, clavinet, vibraphone

=== Additional musicians ===
- Mike Mogis – baritone electric guitar, acoustic guitar, mandolin, 12-string acoustic guitar, hi-strung guitar, percussion, bajo sexto, banjo, bass, claps
- Dave Ozinga – drums, percussion
- Andrew Janak – saxophone, clarinet
- Miwi La Lupa – trumpet, vocals
- Megan Siebe – cello
- Corina Figueroa Escamilla – vocals

=== Production ===
- Production, recording – Mike Mogis
- Assistant engineers – Adam Roberts and Jon Ochsner
- Mastering – Gavin Lurssen
- Package design: – Donny Phillips
- Photography – Joshua Black Wilkins
