= What a Song Can Do =

Studio album by Lady A
- Released: October 22, 2021
- Studio: Sound Stage (Nashville); Starstruck (Nashville)
- Genre: Country pop
- Length: 51:24
- Label: Big Machine
- Producer: Dann Huff

Lady A chronology
Ocean (2019)	What a Song Can Do (2021)	On This Winter's Night Vol.2 (2025)

Singles from What a Song Can Do
- 1. "Like a Lady" Released: March 15, 2021; 2. "What a Song Can Do" Released: January 31, 2022

What a Song Can Do is the ninth studio album by American country music trio Lady A. It was released on October 22, 2021, through Big Machine Records. The album includes the single "Like a Lady" and thirteen other tracks. It is also the first new album released under the name Lady A and second after the deluxe edition of Ocean in 2020.

== Background ==
Prior to the album's release, the band issued the extended play What a Song Can Do (Chapter One), containing tracks from the album. This extended play contains seven songs, and the album contains seven more. Thirteen of the project's fourteen songs were co-written by at least one member of the band; Dave Haywood wrote "Workin' on This Love" by himself and even sings lead vocals on it, making this the first and so far only album to feature a solo from him. The track "Friends Don't Let Friends" features guest vocals from Carly Pearce, Thomas Rhett, and Darius Rucker. Dann Huff is the album's producer.

== Critical reception ==
Stephen Thomas Erlewine of AllMusic wrote that "The 14 songs never deviate from the middle of the road, a path they follow with the urgency of a Sunday afternoon drive[...] they give the arrangements enough room to be breezy and help keep the melody in the forefront -- tricks that make for a very pleasant listen, even if it is quite a familiar one."

== Track listing ==
What a Song Can Do track listing
No.	Title	Writer(s)	Lead vocals	Length
1.	"Talk of This Town"	Hillary Scott; Charles Kelley; Dave Haywood; Nicolle Galyon; Jordan Reynolds	Kelley; Scott	3:45
2.	"What a Song Can Do"	Kelley; Sam Ellis; Ryan Hurd; Laura Veltz	Kelley; Scott	3:41
3.	"Like a Lady"	Scott; Dave Barnes; Michelle Buzz; Martin Johnson; Brandon Paddock	Scott	3:01
4.	"Things He Handed Down"	Kelley; Julian Bunetta; Jesse Frasure; Thomas Rhett	Kelley	3:18
5.	"Fire"	Scott; Kelley; Haywood; Justin Ebach	Scott	3:14
6.	"Chance of Rain"	Kelley; Haywood; Tofer Brown; Ebach	Kelley	3:31
7.	"Worship What I Hate"	Scott; Haywood; Natalie Hemby; Amy Wadge	Scott	4:20
8.	"Where Would I Be"	Hemby; David Garcia; Jordan Minton	Scott; Kelley	3:43
9.	"Friends Don't Let Friends" (featuring Thomas Rhett, Darius Rucker, and Carly Pearce)	Kelley; Rhett; Bunetta; Ashley Gorley	Kelley; Scott; Rhett; Rucker; Pearce	3:32
10.	"In Waves"	Kelley; Joey Hendricks; Alysa Vanderheym; Michael Whitworth	Kelley	3:22
11.	"You Keep Thinking That"	Kelley; Dave Cohen; Chris Gelbuda; Steven Lee Olsen	Scott	3:01
12.	"Be That for You"	Haywood; Kelley; Corey Crowder	Kelley; Scott	4:43
13.	"Workin’ on This Love"	Haywood	Haywood	3:49
14.	"Swore I Was Leaving"	Haywood; Kelley; Scott; Reynolds; Parker Welling	Scott; Kelley	4:24
Total length:				51:24

== Personnel ==
Adapted from liner notes.

=== Lady A ===
- Dave Haywood – vocals (all tracks), acoustic guitar (all tracks), bouzouki (track 8), mandolin (tracks 1, 2, 4, 6, 10–13), percussion (track 8), resonator guitar (track 8), strings (tracks 1, 8), synthesizer (track 1), tambourine (track 10), bar noise (track 1)
- Charles Kelley – vocals (all tracks)
- Hillary Scott – vocals (all tracks)

=== Additional musicians ===
- Roy Agee – trombone (track 11), bass trombone (track 11)
- David Angell – violin (track 7)
- Monisa Angell – viola (track 7)
- Kevin Bate – cello (track 7)
- Jenny Bifano – violin (track 7)
- Tom Bukovac – electric guitar (all tracks except 11 & 13)
- Julian Bunetta – programming (track 9)
- Vinnie Ciesielski – flugelhorn (track 11), trumpet (track 11), horn arrangements (track 11)
- Dave Cohen – B-3 organ (tracks 1, 2, 6, 14), keyboards (track 3), piano (tracks 2, 4–7), programming (track 11), synthesizer (tracks 4, 5, 7, 11, 12), synth bass (track 11)
- David Davidson – violin (track 3)
- Stuart Duncan – fiddle (track 3)
- Justin Ebach – electric guitar (track 5), programming (track 5), synthesizer (track 5), synth bass (track 5)
- Sam Ellis – programming (track 2)
- Alicia Engstrom – violin (track 7)
- Shannon Forrest – drums (tracks 10, 11, 13), percussion (track 13)
- Paul Franklin – steel guitar (tracks 2, 4, 5, 10, 13, 14)
- Jesse Frasure – programming (track 4)
- Chris Gelbuda – electric guitar (track 11)
- Austin Hoke – cello (track 7)
- Dann Huff – bouzouki (track 5), Dobro (tracks 3, 5), Dobro solo (track 5), electric guitar (tracks 1–3, 5, 6, 9–12, 14), electric guitar solo (tracks 1–3, 6, 9, 12, 14), high-string acoustic guitar (track 5), programming (tracks 2–4, 9–13), synthesizer (tracks 10, 13), synth bass (track 3)
- David Huff – programming (all tracks), synth bass (track 10)
- Jun Iwasaki – violin (track 7)
- Martin Johnson – electric guitar (track 3)
- Charlie Judge – B-3 organ (tracks 9, 11), piano (tracks 2, 11), synthesizer (tracks 2, 5, 7, 8, 10, 12, 13), synth bass (track 12)
- Betsy Lamb – viola (track 7)
- Tony Lucido – bass guitar (tracks 10, 11, 13)
- Justin Niebank – programming (all tracks except 3)
- Brandon Paddock – Dobro (track 3), programming (track 3)
- Carly Pearce – featured vocals (track 9)
- Jordan Reynolds – programming (track 1)
- Thomas Rhett – featured vocals (track 9)
- Jerry Roe – drums (tracks 8, 9), percussion (track 8)
- Darius Rucker – featured vocals (track 9)
- Jimmie Lee Sloas – bass guitar (tracks 1–9, 12, 14)
- Aaron Sterling – drums (tracks 1–7, 12, 14), percussion (tracks 3, 6, 7, 14)
- Ilya Toshinsky – acoustic guitar (all tracks except 3 & 7), banjo (tracks 3, 5, 9), Dobro (track 7), mandolin (track 3)
- Alysa Vanderheym – synthesizer (track 10), background vocals (track 10)
- Derek Wells – electric guitar (tracks 10, 11, 13), electric guitar solo (track 11)
- Kris Wilkinson – string arrangements (track 7)
- Karen Winkelmann – violin (track 7)

=== Technical and visuals ===
- Sean Badum – recording assistance (tracks 1–7, 12, 14)
- Drew Bollman – recording, additional mix engineering
- Sandi Spika Borchetta – art direction
- Jesse Brock – mixing assistance (track 3)
- Callie Cunningham – art direction
- Nicole Flammia – art direction
- Parker Foote – graphic design
- Justin Ford – art direction
- Mike "Frog" Griffith – production coordination
- Dann Huff – production
- David Huff – digital editing
- Martin Johnson – additional production
- Joe LaPorta – mastering
- Steve Marcantonio – strings recording
- Joel McKinney – recording assistance (tracks 8–11, 13)
- Buckley Miller – recording
- Sean Moffitt – mixing
- Joshua Sage Newman – graphic design
- Justin Niebank – mixing (tracks 1, 2, 4–14)
- Ryan Nishimori – graphic design
- Brandon Paddock – additional production (track 3)
- Chris Small – digital editing
- Hodges Usry – photography
- Kolby Vetter – art direction
- Michael Walter – recording assistance (track 7)

== Chart performance ==
Weekly chart performance for What a Song Can Do
Chart (2021)	Peak position
Australian Albums (ARIA)	48
Australian Country Albums (ARIA)	5
Scottish Albums (OCC)	31
Swiss Albums (Schweizer Hitparade)	52
UK Country Albums (OCC)	1
UK Album Downloads (OCC)	18
US Billboard 200	135
US Top Country Albums (Billboard)	12
