= What a Song Can Do (Chapter One) =

EP by Lady A
- Released: June 25, 2021
- Genre: Country
- Length: 24:50
- Label: Big Machine
- Producers: Dann Huff (all tracks); Martin Johnson (track 3); Brandon Paddock (track 3)

Lady A chronology
| Ocean (2019) | What a Song Can Do (Chapter One) (2021) | What a Song Can Do (2021) |

What a Song Can Do (Chapter One) is the third extended play by American country music trio Lady Antebellum, and their first since shortening their group name to Lady A from Lady Antebellum. It was released through Big Machine on June 25, 2021.

== Release and promotion ==
"Like a Lady", the album's first single, was performed on The Ellen DeGeneres Show on May 19, 2021. Lady A announced What a Song Can Do on June 9.

=== Tour ===
Lady A will embark on the What a Song Can Do Tour in support of the album. It began on July 29, 2021, in Uncasville, Connecticut.

== Track listing ==
What a Song Can Do (Chapter One) track listing
| No. | Title | Writer(s) | Lead vocals | Length |
|---|---|---|---|---|
| 1. | "Talk of This Town" | Hillary Scott; Charles Kelley; Dave Haywood; Nicolle Galyon; Jordan Reynolds | Charles Kelley, Hillary Scott | 3:45 |
| 2. | "What a Song Can Do" | Kelley; Sam Ellis; Ryan Hurd; Laura Veltz | Kelley, Scott | 3:41 |
| 3. | "Like a Lady" | Scott; Dave Barnes; Michelle Buzz; Martin Johnson; Brandon Paddock | Scott | 3:01 |
| 4. | "Things He Handed Down" | Kelley; Julian Bunetta; Jesse Frasure; Thomas Rhett | Kelley | 3:18 |
| 5. | "Fire" | Scott; Kelley; Haywood; Justin Ebach | Scott | 3:14 |
| 6. | "Chance of Rain" | Kelley; Haywood; Tofer Brown; Ebach | Kelley | 3:31 |
| 7. | "Worship What I Hate" | Scott; Haywood; Natalie Hemby; Amy Wadge | Scott | 4:20 |
| Total length: | | | | 24:50 |

== Personnel ==
Adapted from What a Song Can Do album liner notes.

Lady A

- Dave Haywood – vocals (all tracks), acoustic guitar (all tracks), mandolin (tracks 1, 2, 4, 6), strings (track 1), synthesizer (track 1), bar noise (track 1)
- Charles Kelley – vocals (all tracks)
- Hillary Scott – vocals (all tracks)

Musicians

- David Angell – violin (track 7)
- Monisa Angell – viola (track 7)
- Kevin Bate – cello (track 7)
- Jenny Bifano – violin (track 7)
- Tom Bukovac – electric guitar (all tracks)
- Dave Cohen – B-3 organ (tracks 1, 2, 6), keyboards (track 3), piano (tracks 2, 4–7), synthesizer (tracks 4, 5, 7)
- David Davidson – violin (track 7)
- Stuart Duncan – fiddle (track 3)
- Justin Ebach – electric guitar (track 5), programming (track 5), synthesizer (track 5), synth bass (track 5)
- Sam Ellis – programming (track 2)
- Alicia Enstrom – violin (track 7)
- Paul Franklin – steel guitar (tracks 2, 4, 5)
- Jesse Frasure – programming (track 4)
- Austin Hoke – cello (track 7)
- Dann Huff – bouzouki (track 5), dobro (tracks 3, 5), dobro solo (track 5), electric guitar (all tracks except 4 & 7), electric guitar solo (tracks 1–3, 6), high string acoustic guitar (track 5), programming (tracks 2–4), synth bass (track 3)
- David Huff – programming (all tracks)
- Jun Iwasaki – violin (track 7)
- Martin Johnson – electric guitar (track 3)
- Charlie Judge – piano (track 2), synthesizer (tracks 2, 5, 7)
- Betsy Lamb – viola (track 7)
- Justin Niebank – programming (all tracks except 3)
- Brandon Paddock – dobro (track 3), programming (track 3)
- Jordan Reynolds – programming (track 1)
- Jimmie Lee Sloas – bass guitar (all tracks)
- Aaron Sterling – drums (all tracks), percussion (tracks 3, 6, 7)
- Ilya Toshinsky – acoustic guitar (all tracks except 3 & 7), banjo (tracks 3, 5), dobro (track 7) mandolin (track 3)
- Kris Wilkinson – string arrangements (track 7)
- Karen Winkelmann – violin (track 7)

Production

- Sean R. Badum – assistant engineer
- Jesse Brock – mixing assistant
- Mike "Frog" Griffith – production coordination
- Dann Huff – producer
- David Huff – editing
- Martin Johnson – producer
- Joe LaPorta – mastering
- Steve Marcantonio – recording
- Buckley Miller – recording
- Steve Moffitt – mixing
- Justin Nieback – mixing
- Brian Paddock – producing
- Chris Small – editing
- Michael Walter – assistant engineer

== Charts ==
Chart performance for What a Song Can Do (Chapter One)
| Chart (2021) | Peak position |
|---|---|
| Australian Albums (ARIA) | 97 |
| UK Country Albums (Official Charts) | 3 |
| UK Album Downloads (Official Charts) | 9 |
