= You Hear Georgia =

Studio album by Blackberry Smoke
- Released: May 28, 2021
- Genre: Southern rock
- Length: 40:21
- Label: 3 Legged
- Producer: Dave Cobb

Blackberry Smoke chronology
Find a Light (2018)	You Hear Georgia (2021)	Be Right Here (2024)

You Hear Georgia is the seventh studio album by American rock band Blackberry Smoke, released on May 28, 2021, through 3 Legged Records, with distribution by Thirty Tigers. It was produced by Dave Cobb and includes contributions from Jamey Johnson and Warren Haynes. The album received positive reviews from critics and charted across Europe, the UK and the US.

== Critical reception ==
Professional ratings
Aggregate scores
Source	Rating
Metacritic	70/100
Review scores
Source	Rating
Mojo	3/5 stars
Uncut	6/10

You Hear Georgia is an ode to the band's home state. In the title track, the band's lyrics celebrate where they're from, while also give a warning to others to not underestimate the south. Singer Charlie Starr said that the title track is "about the South being misunderstood," as reported by the Rolling Stone.

You Hear Georgia received a score of 70 out of 100 on review aggregator Metacritic based on eight critics' reviews, indicating "generally favorable" reception.

Uncut stated that "Lynyrd Skynyrd's Rickey Medlocke co-writes one song, and most others sound like someone from Skynyrd did. But the best tracks, counterintuitively, are those furthest from Blackberry Smoke's trademark boogie". Mojo felt that "deep into side two You Hear Georgia starts to drag a little as they ditch the choogle and attempt to foray into the cosmic Americana territory of My Morning Jacket".

Louder, a publication focused on rock and alternative genres, wrote that You Hear Georgia was comfortably in line with Blackberry Smoke's previous albums. "A couple of other unremarkable tracks leave this album just short of being a stunner, but for the most part Blackberry Smoke have done Georgia proud once again," Louder wrote.

== Track listing ==
You Hear Georgia track listing
No.	Title	Length
1.	"Live It Down"	4:06
2.	"You Hear Georgia"	4:05
3.	"Hey Delilah"	3:26
4.	"Ain't the Same"	4:20
5.	"Lonesome for a Livin'" (featuring Jamey Johnson)	4:28
6.	"All Rise Again" (featuring Warren Haynes)	4:13
7.	"Old Enough to Know"	3:28
8.	"Morningside"	4:24
9.	"All Over the Road"	3:48
10.	"Old Scarecrow" (Charlie Starr, Rickey Medlocke, Jason C. Miller and Stewart Cararas)	3:36
Total length:		40:21

== Charts ==
Chart performance for You Hear Georgia
Chart (2021)	Peak position
Austrian Albums (Ö3 Austria)	34
Belgian Albums (Ultratop Flanders)	35
Belgian Albums (Ultratop Wallonia)	53
Dutch Albums (Album Top 100)	48
German Albums (Offizielle Top 100)	21
Scottish Albums (Official Charts)	6
Spanish Albums (Promusicae)	50
Swedish Albums (Sverigetopplistan)	53
Swiss Albums (Schweizer Hitparade)	9
UK Albums (Official Charts)	17
US Billboard 200	55
US Americana/Folk Albums (Billboard)	1
US Independent Albums (Billboard)	6
US Top Country Albums (Billboard)	5
US Indie Store Album Sales (Billboard)	8
