= Be Right Here (album) =

Studio album by Blackberry Smoke
- Released: February 16, 2024
- Genre: Southern rock
- Length: 40:07
- Label: 3 Legged
- Producer: Dave Cobb

Blackberry Smoke chronology
You Hear Georgia (2021)	Be Right Here (2024)

Be Right Here is the eighth studio album by American rock band Blackberry Smoke, released on February 16, 2024, through 3 Legged Records. It was produced by Dave Cobb and received acclaim from critics. It is the final album with drummer and band co-founder Brit Turner, who died on March 3, 2024.

== Critical reception ==
Professional ratings
Aggregate scores
Source	Rating
Metacritic	84/100
Review scores
Source	Rating
AllMusic	4/5 stars
Classic Rock	4/5 stars
Uncut	8/10

Be Right Here received a score of 84 out of 100 on review aggregator Metacritic based on four critics' reviews, indicating "universal acclaim". Uncut felt that "when approached on its own merits, the Dave Cobb-produced Be Right Here is a minor classic of the genre". Stephen Thomas Erlewine of AllMusic wrote that the band "don't attempt any new tracks on Be Right Here, their eighth studio album. Settling into a Dixie-fried groove created from equal parts soul and album rock, Blackberry Smoke still sound recognizably Southern, but they're not adhering to the gospel of Skynyrd and the Allmans as closely as they once did".

Classic Rock's Philip Wilding stated that the album "retains the simple formula that has made the band such a success: songs, tons of songs. Regular co-writers, a band unafraid to experiment, surprising tones and textures, but the fundamentals are intact; listen to a tune, and three minutes later you're whistling the damn melody and mangling the lyrics". Jim Hynes of Glide Magazine wrote that "the band sounds loose as they dig into some serious issues, but rest assured that their classic anthems are still present, though the album goes far beyond mere toe tapping or foot stomping".

== Track listing ==
Be Right Here track listing
No.	Title	Writer(s)	Length
1.	"Dig a Hole"	Charlie Starr; Brandon Still	4:12
2.	"Hammer and the Nail"	Starr; Keith Nelson	2:54
3.	"Like It Was Yesterday"	Starr; Nelson	3:26
4.	"Be So Lucky"	Starr	3:54
5.	"Azalea"	Starr; Travis Meadows	4:16
6.	"Don't Mind If I Do"	Starr	3:35
7.	"Whatcha Know Good"	Starr; Brent Cobb	4:03
8.	"Other Side of the Light"	Starr; Levi Lowrey	4:09
9.	"Little Bit Crazy"	Starr; Meadows	4:46
10.	"Barefoot Angel"	Starr; Adam Hood	4:52
Total length:			40:07

== Personnel ==
Blackberry Smoke

- Paul Jackson – lead and rhythm guitar, backing vocals
- Charlie Starr – lead vocals, lead and rhythm guitar
- Brandon Still – keyboards
- Brit Turner – drums
- Richard Turner – bass

Additional musicians

- Preston Holcomb – percussion
- Sherie Murphy – backing vocals
- Sherita Murphy – backing vocals
- Benji Shanks – third guitar, mandolin

Technical

- John Baldwin – mastering
- Ethan Barrette – engineering assistance
- Brandon Bell – engineering
- Dave Cobb – production
- Miles Landrum – additional engineering
- Phillip Smith – engineering assistance
- Tom Tapley – mixing, engineering

Visuals

- Andy Sapp – creative design, photography
- Jamie Sapp – photography
- Brit Turner – art direction
- Bryan Wills – creative design

== Charts ==
Chart performance for Be Right Here
Chart (2024)	Peak position
Belgian Albums (Ultratop Flanders)	23
Belgian Albums (Ultratop Wallonia)	169
German Albums (Offizielle Top 100)	16
Scottish Albums (OCC)	6
Spanish Albums (Promusicae)	64
Swiss Albums (Schweizer Hitparade)	10
UK Albums (OCC)	31
UK Independent Albums (OCC)	4
US Billboard 200	132
US Americana/Folk Albums (Billboard)	9
US Independent Albums (Billboard)	24
US Top Country Albums (Billboard)	26
US Top Rock Albums (Billboard)	23
