= Absent Fathers =

Studio album by Justin Townes Earle
- Released: January 13, 2015
- Recorded: 2014
- Genre: Country
- Label: Vagrant, Loose
- Producer: Justin Townes Earle, Adam Bednarik

Justin Townes Earle chronology
Single Mothers (2014)	Absent Fathers (2015)	Kids in the Street (2017)

Professional ratings
Aggregate scores
Source	Rating
Metacritic	73/100
Review scores
Source	Rating
AllMusic	4/5 stars
Consequence of Sound	B−
Exclaim!	4/10

Absent Fathers is the sixth studio album by American musician Justin Townes Earle. It was released in January 2015 under Vagrant Records and Loose.

== Critical reception ==
Mike Sauve of Exclaim! wrote that "the problem is that Earle's melancholy has taken primacy over his songwriting, which is uncharacteristically generic here, making this subdued and plodding release a career low." Grant Golden of Paste wrote, "For all of the somber overtones to Absent Fathers, there's still plenty of hopefulness within this record ... [o]ne can only hope that this landing means that he's as comfortable with self-exploration and transparency in the future as he's been on Single Mothers and Absent Fathers, because if so then the best of Earle may still be yet to come."

== Track listing ==
All tracks are written by Justin Townes Earle.

No.	Title	Length
1.	"Farther from Me"	3:45
2.	"Why"	2:26
3.	"Least I Got the Blues"	2:31
4.	"Call Ya Momma"	3:37
5.	"Day and Night"	4:24
6.	"Round the Bend"	2:32
7.	"When the One You Love Loses Faith"	4:11
8.	"Slow Monday"	2:19
9.	"Someone Will Pay"	2:13
10.	"Looking for a Place to Land"	3:29

== Personnel ==
- Justin Townes Earle – acoustic guitar and vocals
- Paul Niehaus – guitar and pedal steel
- Mark Hedman – bass
- Matt Pence – drums
