= Blackberry Smoke =

American rock band

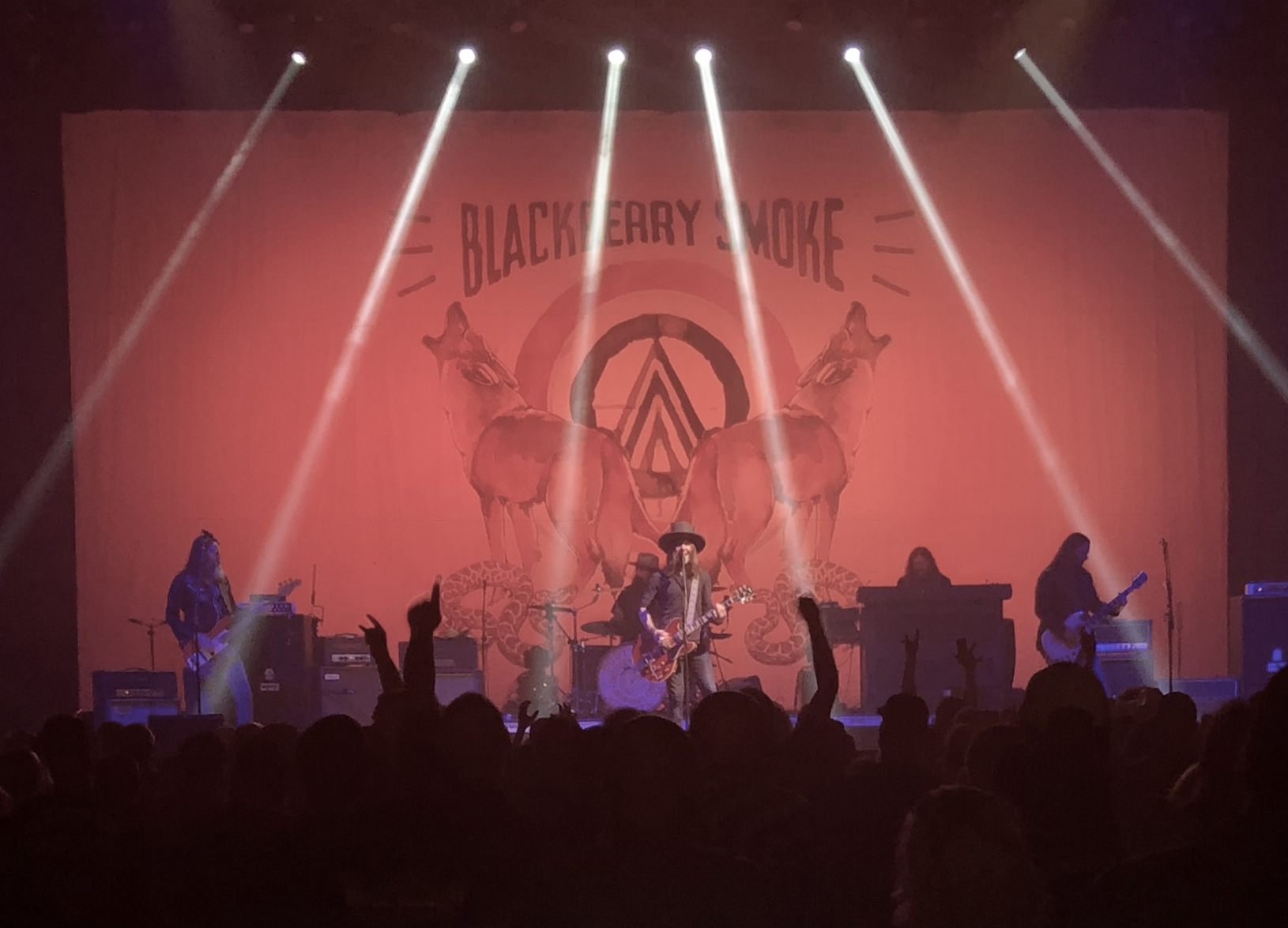
- Blackberry Smoke performing in 2018

Background information
- Origin: Atlanta, Georgia, U.S.
- Genres: Southern rock; country rock; hard rock; blues rock; jam band
- Years active: 2000–present
- Labels: BamaJam, Southern Ground, Rounder, 3 Legged, Earache (Europe)
- Members: Charlie Starr; Paul Jackson; Richard Turner; Brandon Still; Benji Shanks; Kent Aberle
- Past members: Brit Turner; Preston Holcomb
- Website: blackberrysmoke.com

Blackberry Smoke is an American rock band formed in Atlanta, Georgia, in 2001. The lineup consists of lead vocalist and lead guitarist Charlie Starr, lead/rhythm guitarist Paul Jackson, bassist Richard Turner and keyboardist Brandon Still. Richard's brother Brit Turner was the band's co-founder and drummer before his death in March 2024. Drumming duties have been covered during the band's tours since late 2023 by Atlanta drummer Kent Aberle. In 2018, they added touring members guitarist Benji Shanks and percussionist Preston Holcomb, with Holcomb retiring from touring in the spring of 2024. They have released eight studio albums, two live albums and five extended plays.

== History ==
Blackberry Smoke was formed in Atlanta, Georgia, in 2001. They are the first independently released artist to hit No. 1 on the Billboard Country Album charts in modern history. Their debut album Bad Luck Ain't No Crime was released in 2003. Their second album Little Piece of Dixie, released in 2009, was featured by Paste magazine and other publications.

In 2015, Blackberry Smoke became the first small independent outfit to have an album, Holding All The Roses, go to No. 1 on the Billboard Country Albums chart. Blackberry Smoke's 2016 album Like An Arrow did the same. They have performed throughout the United States, Europe, Australia, and South America. They have performed alongside artists such as Tedeschi Trucks Band, Guns N' Roses, Zac Brown Band, ZZ Top, Eric Church and Lynyrd Skynyrd.

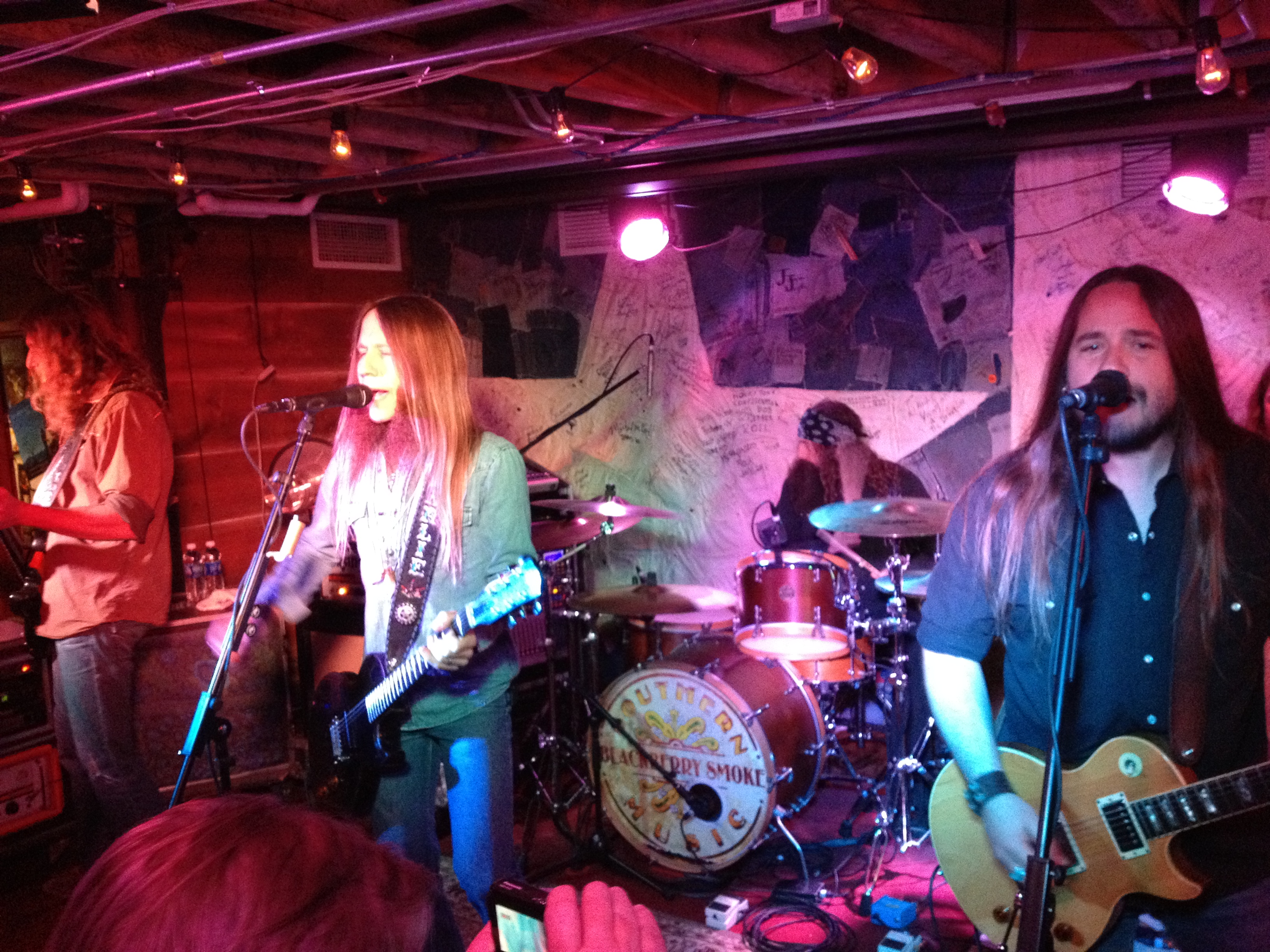
Blackberry Smoke performing in 2012

The band had their first chart success with their third album The Whippoorwill, released under the Southern Ground record label in August 2012. It reached Top 40 on Billboard 200. On August 26, 2012, they performed at a charity benefit called the Boot Ride with the cast of Sons of Anarchy, partnered with The Boot Campaign at the Happy Ending Bar and Grill in Hollywood, California.

On November 12, 2014, they appeared with many others, including Jamey Johnson, Trace Adkins, Warren Haynes, Peter Frampton, Gregg Allman, in a show in tribute to Lynyrd Skynyrd at the Fox Theatre in Atlanta.

They moved to Rounder Records in 2014, and released Holding All the Roses, produced by Brendan O'Brien, in early 2015. The album reached No. 1 on Billboard's Country Albums chart. The band spent much of the summer of 2016 on tour with Gov't Mule.

Blackberry Smoke released their fifth studio album Like an Arrow, featuring Gregg Allman, on October 14, 2016, on their own record label, 3 Legged Records. The album landed at No. 1 on the US Billboard Country and Americana/Folk charts as well as the UK Rock and Independent Albums charts during release week. The band released its sixth studio album Find A Light on December 19, 2018.

In 2019, the band released via Earache Records a live album and a film, Homecoming: Live in Atlanta, recorded at their annual Brothers And Sisters Holiday Homecoming event at the Tabernacle in Atlanta in November 2018.

The band released its seventh studio album You Hear Georgia on May 28, 2021. It debuted at No. 1 on the Billboard Americana/Folk Chart. It sold over 33,000 copies in the first week, 12,239 copies in pure album sales. This was good enough to put it at No. 1 in album sales in both country and rock, and No. 3 in all music. The album also racked up another nearly 1 million streams in its debut week. The album was produced by Dave Cobb and featured appearances by Jamey Johnson and Warren Haynes.

The band's drummer Brit Turner was diagnosed with glioblastoma in 2022 and died from it in March 2024, at the age of 57. On April 5, 2024, Preston Holcomb announced via Facebook his last show would be on April 27 and he would no longer be touring with the band.

== Band members ==
Current members

- Charlie "Starr" Gray – lead vocals, lead & rhythm guitar (2000–present)
- Paul Jackson – rhythm & lead guitar, backing vocals (2000–present)
- Richard Turner – bass, backing vocals (2000–present)
- Brandon Still – keyboards (2009–present)
- Benji Shanks – third guitar, mandolin, dobro (2018–present)

Touring members

- Kent Aberle – drums, percussion (2022–present)

Former members

- Brit Turner – drums (2000–2024; his death)
- Preston Holcomb – percussion (2018–2024)

== Discography ==
=== Studio albums ===
List of studio albums, with selected peak chart positions and sales
Title	Album details	Peak chart positions								Sales
Title	Album details	US	US Country	US Americana	US Heat	US Indie	US Rock	UK	UK Rock	Sales
Bad Luck Ain't No Crime	Release date: January 7, 2003; Label: BamaJam	—	—	—	—	—	—	—	—	
Little Piece of Dixie	Release date: September 29, 2009; Label: BamaJam	—	—	—	—	—	—	—	—	
The Whippoorwill	Release date: August 14, 2012; Label: Southern Ground	40	8	30	10	12	—	30	2	US: 51,000
Holding All the Roses	Release date: February 10, 2015; Label: Rounder Records	29	1	—	—	7	—	17	1	US: 49,600
Like an Arrow	Release date: October 14, 2016; Label: 3 Legged	12	1	—	2	3	—	8	1	US: 48,000
Find a Light	Release date: April 6, 2018; Label: 3 Legged	31	3	—	2	6	—	12	1	US: 31,300
You Hear Georgia	Release date: May 28, 2021; Label: 3 Legged / Thirty Tigers	55	5	1	6	7	—	17	—	
Be Right Here	Release date: February 16, 2024; Label: 3 Legged / Thirty Tigers	135	26	9	—	24	23	31	—	
"—" denotes releases that did not chart

=== Live albums ===
List of live albums, with selected peak chart positions and sales
Title	Album details	Peak chart positions					Sales
Title	Album details	US Country	US	US Indie	GER	UK	Sales
Leave a Scar, Live: North Carolina	Release date: July 8, 2014; Label: 3 Legged Records	17	128	22	49	35	US: 2,400; UK: 2,181
Homecoming/Live in Atlanta	Release date: November 15, 2019; Label: 3 Legged Records; Label: Earache Records (U.K. Europe only)	—	—	4	—	—	US: 2,500
"—" denotes releases that did not chart

=== Extended plays ===
Title	Details
New Honky Tonk Bootlegs	Release date: July 15, 2008; Label: self-released
Little Piece of Dixie EP	Release date: October 14, 2008; Label: Big Karma Records
Wood, Wire & Roses	Release date: September 18, 2015; Label: 3 Legged Records
The Southern Ground Sessions	Release date: October 26, 2018; Label: 3 Legged Records
Live from Capricorn Sound Studios	Release date: June 19, 2020; Label: 3 Legged Records
Stoned	Release date: 2021; Label: 3 Legged

=== Singles ===
Year	Title	Peak positions	Album
Year	Title	US Country Airplay	Album
2009	"Good One Comin' On"	—	Little Piece of Dixie
2013	"Pretty Little Lie"	46	The Whippoorwill
2013	"Ain't Much Left of Me"	—	The Whippoorwill
2014	"Wood, Wire, Roses"	—	Non-album single
2015	"Living in the Song"	—	Holding All the Roses
2015	"Too High"	—	Holding All the Roses
2016	"Waiting for the Thunder"	—	Like an Arrow
2016	"Pearls"	—	Like an Arrow (deluxe edition)
2016	"Believe You Me"	—	Non-album singles
2016	"Sunrise in Texas"	—	Non-album singles
2016	"Let It Burn"	—	Non-album singles
2018	"Flesh and Bone"	—	Find a Light
2018	"Best Seat in the House"	—	Find a Light
2018	"Let Me Down Easy"	—	Find a Light
2018	"I'll Keep Ramblin'"	—	Find a Light
2020	"Midnight Rider"	—	Non-album singles
2020	"Take the Highway"	—	Non-album singles
2020	"Keep on Smiling"	—	Non-album singles
2020	"Southern Child"	—	Non-album singles
2021	"You Hear Georgia"	—	You Hear Georgia
2021	"Hey Delilah"	—	You Hear Georgia
2021	"Ain't the Same"	—	You Hear Georgia
2021	"All Rise Again"	—	You Hear Georgia
2024	"A Little Bit Crazy"	—	Be Right Here
"—" denotes releases that did not chart

=== Music videos ===
Year	Video	Director
2003	"Sanctified Woman"	
2009	"Good One Comin' On"	Roger Pistole
2013	"Pretty Little Lie"	Cole Cassell
2014	"Shakin' Hands with the Holy Ghost"	Lewis Cater
2014	"Six Ways to Sunday"	Blake Judd
2015	"Too High"	Blake Judd
2015	"Rock and Roll Again"	
2016	"Sunrise in Texas"	Jamie Burton Chamberlin
2017	"Like an Arrow"	Jamie Burton Chamberlin
2021	"You Hear Georgia	Andy Sapp
2021	"Hey Delilah"	Andy Sapp
2021	"All Rise Again"	Andy Sapp
