= The Saint of Lost Causes =

Studio album by Justin Townes Earle
- Released: May 24, 2019
- Studios: Sound Emporium (Nashville, Tennessee)
- Genre: Americana
- Length: 49:32
- Language: English
- Label: New West
- Producers: Adam Bednarik; Justin Townes Earle

Justin Townes Earle chronology
| Kids in the Street (2017) | The Saint of Lost Causes (2019) |

The Saint of Lost Causes is the eighth and final studio album released by American singer-songwriter Justin Townes Earle, and the last released before his death in 2020. It was released by New West Records on May 24, 2019.

== Reception ==
According to the review aggregator Metacritic, The Saint of Lost Causes received "generally favorable reviews" based on a weighted average score of 74 out of 100 from six critic scores. Jason Heller of NPR's First Listen praised the album for its stark take on contemporary American society as well as its ambiguity. At AllMusic, Mark Deming also emphasized the lyrics and their perspective, summing up that this release, "coalesce[s] into a larger story of malaise that's powerful without turning histrionic, and this is powerful music that's both timely and timeless". In Rolling Stone, Jonathan Bernstein gave the album 3.5 out of five stars, calling this, "a refreshing reminder of what the songwriter has always done best", particularly for Earle's lyrics on familial relations. Libby Cudmore's review in Paste emphasized the environmentalist and spiritual themes in the lyrics, giving the album 8.2 out of 10. Chris Ingalls of PopMatters sees the work as a critique of the American dream and gave it eight out of 10 stars.

== Track listing ==
All songs written by Justin Townes Earle

1. "The Saint of Lost Causes" – 4:51
2. "Ain’t Got No Money" – 3:05
3. "Mornings in Memphis" – 4:32
4. "Don’t Drink the Water" – 4:41
5. "Frightened by the Sound" – 3:45
6. "Flint City Shake It" – 3:44
7. "Over Alameda" – 4:09
8. "Pacific Northwestern Blues" – 3:37
9. "Appalachian Nightmare" – 5:37
10. "Say Baby" – 4:30
11. "Ahi esta mi nina" – 4:06
12. "Talking to Myself" – 2:55

== Personnel ==
- Justin Townes Earle – vocals, acoustic guitar, production
- Adam Ayan – mastering at Gateway Mastering, Portland, Maine, United States
- Adam Bednarik – electric upright bass, bass guitar, engineering, and production
- Tchad Blake – mixing at Full Mongrel Studios, Wales, United Kingdom
- Fetzer Design – design
- Joe V. McMahan – acoustic, baritone, electric, and slide guitar, celesta
- Paul Niehaus – acoustic, electric, and pedal steel guitar
- Jon Radford – drums, percussion
- Zaq Reynolds – engineering
- Joshua Black Wilkins – photography
- Cory Younts – harmonica, piano, backing vocals

== Charts ==
Sales chart performance for The Saint of Lost Causes
| Chart (2019) | Peak |
|---|---|
| Scottish Albums (Official Charts) | 95 |
| UK Americana Albums (Official Charts) | 6 |
| UK Independent Albums (Official Charts) | 41 |
| US Americana/Folk Albums (Billboard) | 23 |
| US Independent Albums (Billboard) | 9 |
| US Top Album Sales (Billboard) | 36 |
| US Indie Store Album Sales (Billboard) | 6 |

== See also ==
- List of 2019 albums
