= Single Mothers (album) =

Studio album by Justin Townes Earle
- Released: September 9, 2014
- Recorded: 2014
- Genre: Country
- Length: 29:46
- Labels: Vagrant, Loose
- Producers: Justin Townes Earle; Adam Bednarik

Justin Townes Earle chronology
Nothing's Gonna Change the Way You Feel About Me Now (2012)	Single Mothers (2014)	Absent Fathers (2015)

Professional ratings
Aggregate scores
Source	Rating
Metacritic	73/100
Review scores
Source	Rating
AllMusic	4/5 stars
Paste	8.9/10
Rolling Stone	3/5 stars
Slant Magazine	3/5 stars

Single Mothers is the fifth studio album by American musician Justin Townes Earle. It was released in September 2014 by Vagrant Records & Loose.

== Track listing ==
All tracks are written by Justin Townes Earle.

No.	Title	Length
1.	"Worried Bout the Weather"	3:33
2.	"Single Mothers"	2:48
3.	"My Baby Drives"	2:11
4.	"Today and a Lonely Night"	2:55
5.	"Picture in a Drawer"	4:09
6.	"Wanna Be a Stranger"	2:33
7.	"White Gardenias"	2:40
8.	"Time Shows Fools"	2:55
9.	"It's Cold in This House"	3:11
10.	"Burning Pictures"	2:47

== Personnel ==
- Justin Townes Earle – acoustic guitar and vocals
- Paul Niehaus – guitar and pedal steel
- Mark Hedman – bass
- Matt Pence – drums
