= Justin Townes Earle =

American musician (1982–2020)

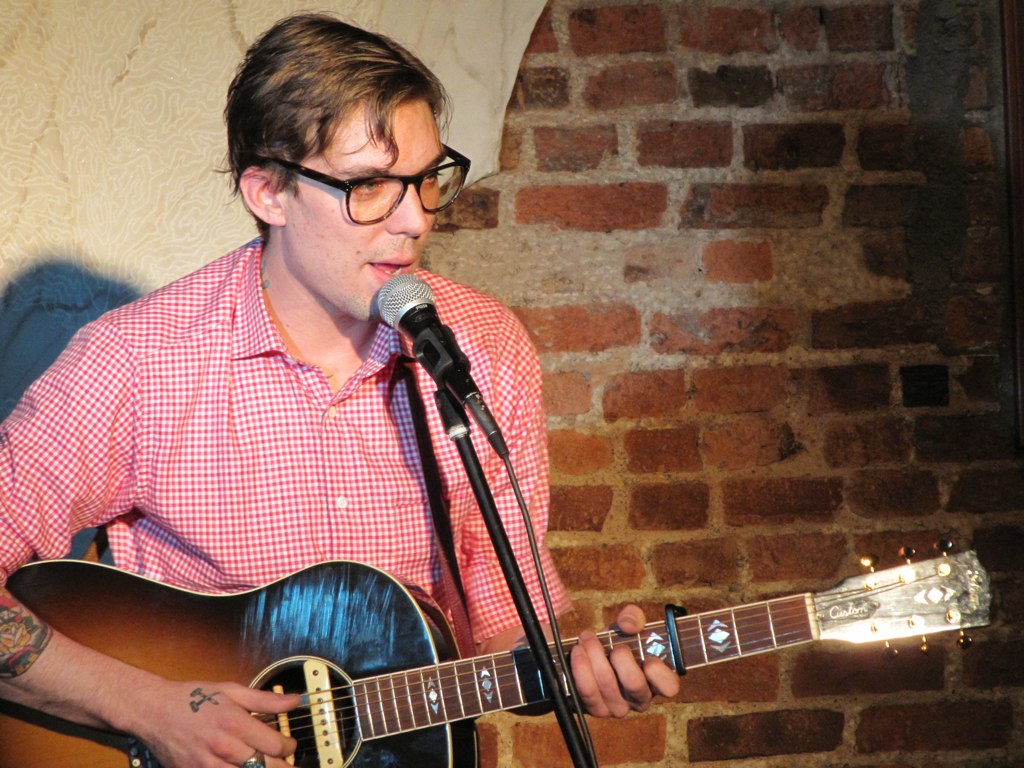
- Earle in 2010

Background information
- Born: January 4, 1982; Nashville, Tennessee, U.S.
- Died: August 20, 2020 (aged 38) Nashville, Tennessee, U.S.
- Genres: Americana; blues; country; folk; soul
- Occupations: Singer-songwriter; musician
- Instruments: Vocals; guitar
- Labels: New West; Vagrant; Loose; Bloodshot
- Website: justintownesearle.com

Justin Townes Earle (January 4, 1982 – August 20, 2020) was an American singer-songwriter and musician. After his debut EP, Yuma (2007), he released eight full-length albums. He was recognized with an Americana Music Award for Emerging Artist of the Year in 2009 and for Song of the Year in 2011 for "Harlem River Blues". His father is alternative country artist Steve Earle.

== Early life ==
Earle grew up in South Nashville, Tennessee, with his mother, Carol Ann Hunter Earle. His father, Steve Earle, named him in honor of his own mentor, singer and songwriter Townes Van Zandt. When Justin was two, his father left the family, but after Steve Earle got sober in 1994 he returned. The younger Earle dropped out of school, occasionally touring with and working for his father, eventually moving to eastern Tennessee with other songwriters. Like his father, he battled addiction beginning in his early teens.

== Career ==
Earle played in two Nashville bands: the rock band the Distributors and the ragtime and bluegrass combo the Swindlers. He spent some time as guitarist and keyboardist for his father's touring band the Dukes. He developed a hybrid style of music mixing folk, blues, and country.

=== Albums ===
In 2007, Earle released a six-song EP called Yuma. He signed a contract with Chicago's Bloodshot Records and released an album called The Good Life in 2008. In 2009, he released the album Midnight at the Movies. In 2010, he released the album Harlem River Blues, followed by the album Nothing's Gonna Change the Way You Feel About Me Now in 2012. From 2014 to 2017, Earle released a "family trilogy" of albums, comprising Single Mothers (2014), Absent Fathers (2015), and Kids in the Street (2017). His final album, The Saint of Lost Causes, was released in May 2019 on New West Records, produced by Adam Bednarik and Earle. Earle also produced Wanda Jackson's album Unfinished Business in 2012 recorded and mixed by Adam Bednarik.

In August 2024, All In: Unreleased & Rarities (The New West Years), a compilation of unheard demos and rare material was released on New West Records. It was compiled and produced by Adam Bednarik and Kim Buie.

== Appearances ==
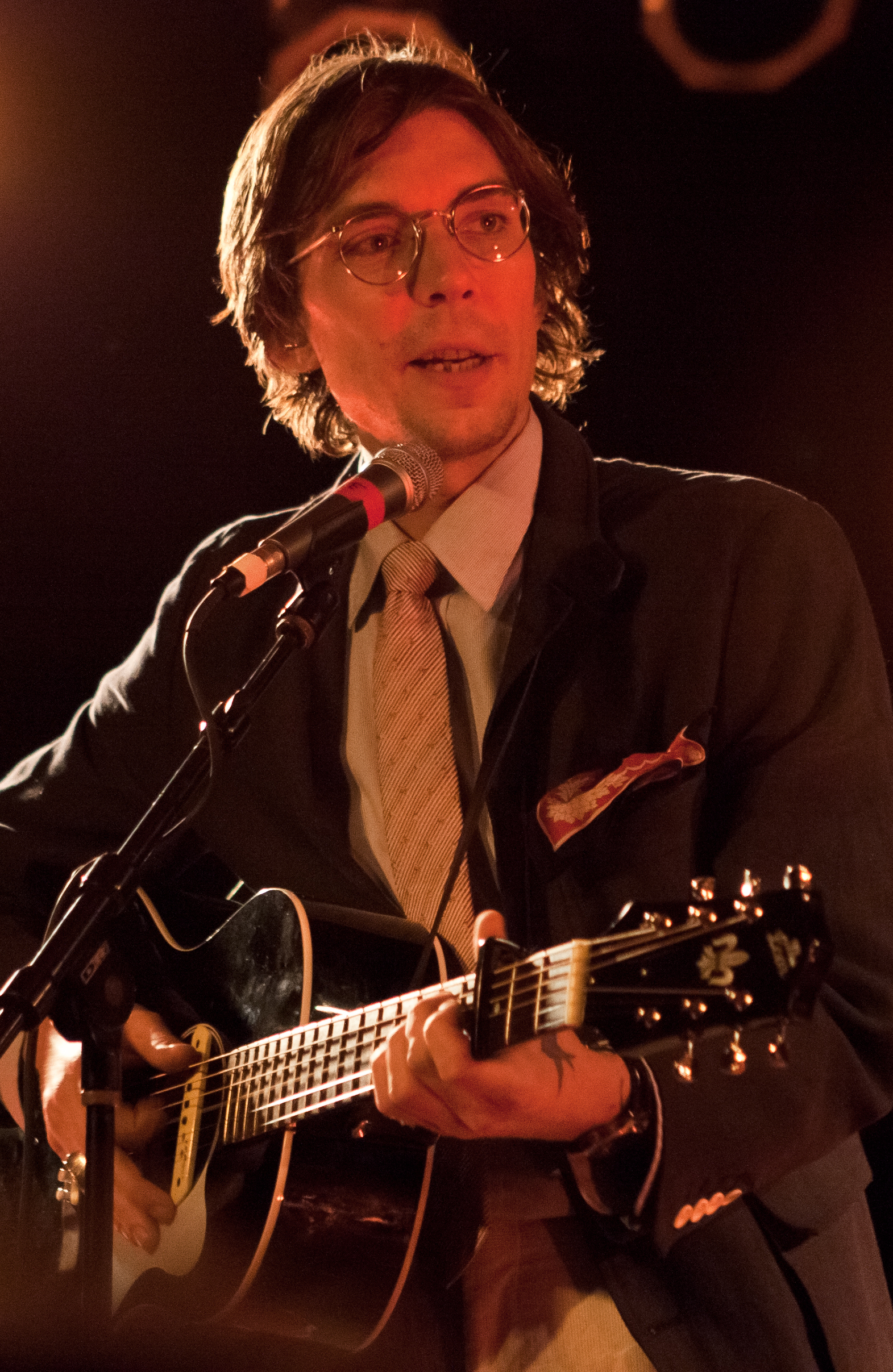
Earle on stage in Houston, Texas, 2012

Earle played the Grand Ole Opry in 2008, WSM Radio, South By Southwest (2008–2010, 2012), the Beacon Theatre (May 2009), the Bristol Rhythm and Roots Reunion (September 2009), Bonnaroo (2009) Bumbershoot (2010), the East Coast Blues & Roots Music Festival (Australia, 2012), the Bowery Ballroom (March 2010), the Winnipeg Folk Festival (July 2008), and the Nelsonville Music Festival (2008 and 2011).

In 2009, Earle co-billed The Big Surprise Tour with Gillian Welch and David Rawlings, Old Crow Medicine Show, and The Felice Brothers.

In 2012, he appeared in an episode of the HBO television series Treme with his father.

== Honors and distinctions ==
In September 2009, Earle received an Americana Music Award for New and Emerging Artist of the Year.

In 2011, Earle received the Americana Music Award in the Song of the Year category for "Harlem River Blues". His album of the same name has been described as having a "gently flowing, urban Americana sound, with horns, organ and tangy electric guitar". That year he also contributed a cover of "Maybe Baby" on the 2011 tribute album Rave on Buddy Holly, and played Newport Folk Festival and the Hardly Strictly Bluegrass Festival.

Nothing's Gonna Change the Way You Feel About Me Now was listed at album number 37 on Rolling Stone's list of the top 50 albums of 2012, with the annotation as follows: "The son of country-rock renegade Steve Earle has grown into a songwriter to rival his dad."

On January 4, 2021, Steve Earle & the Dukes released the album J.T., a tribute to Justin Townes Earle.

On January 4, 2023, a tribute concert was held at the Ryman Auditorium in memory of Justin. Performers included Steve Earle & The Dukes and special guests: Shooter Jennings, Bonnie Whitmore, Amanda Shires, Willy and Cody Braun, Buddy Miller, Ben Nichols (Lucero), Dustin Welch, Elizabeth Cook, Emmylou Harris, Jason Isbell, Jessica Lea Mayfield, Joe Pug, Jon Langford, Lilly Hiatt, Scotty Melton, Stacey Earle and Mark Stuart.

In a 2026 interview with Garden & Gun, Earle's biographer Jonathan Bernstein noted how he helped create a musical environment in which roots-minded artists like Tyler Childers, Charley Crockett and Sierra Ferrell could thrive and become major recording and touring artists. “Justin was someone who quietly has been a major influence and years ahead of his time commercially,” Bernstein said.

== Personal life and death ==
Earle began using illicit drugs at age 12 and continued for many years. In his words, "I discovered very fast that my way of doing things was going to get me in trouble, and I kept going with it, because I believed the myth for a long time, and I believed I had to destroy myself to make great art."

He went to rehabilitation clinics nine times followed by periods of sobriety. He relapsed in September 2010 and again in 2017.

Earle moved to New York City in 2009, but returned to Nashville in 2014. He married Jenn Marie Maynard in 2013 and he and his wife lived on the West Coast. Their only child, a daughter named Etta, was born in June 2017.

Earle died on August 20, 2020, in Nashville, Tennessee, at the age of 38, from an accidental overdose of fentanyl-laced cocaine.

== Discography ==
=== Albums ===
| Title | Album details | Peak chart positions | | | | | |
| Title | Album details | US | US Country | US Rock | US Heat | US Indie | US Folk |
|---|---|---|---|---|---|---|---|
| Yuma (EP) | Release date: February 8, 2007; Label: Bloodshot Records; Formats: CD, 10" Vinyl EP, music download | — | — | — | — | — | — |
| The Good Life | Release date: March 25, 2008; Label: Bloodshot Records; Formats: CD, LP, music download | — | 70 | — | — | — | — |
| Midnight at the Movies | Release date: March 3, 2009; Label: Bloodshot Records; Formats: CD, LP, music download | — | — | — | 15 | 41 | — |
| Harlem River Blues | Release date: September 14, 2010; Label: Bloodshot Records; Formats: CD, LP, music download | 47 | — | 18 | — | 9 | 3 |
| Nothing's Gonna Change the Way You Feel About Me Now | Release date: March 26, 2012; Label: Bloodshot Records; Formats: CD, LP, music download | 62 | — | 19 | — | 11 | 4 |
| Single Mothers | Release date: September 9, 2014; Label: Vagrant Records, Loose Music; Formats: CD, LP, music download | 56 | — | 19 | — | 13 | 3 |
| Absent Fathers | Release date: January 13, 2015; Label: Vagrant Records, Loose Music; Formats: CD, LP, music download | — | — | 16 | — | 13 | 5 |
| Kids in the Street | Release date: May 26, 2017; Label: New West Records; Formats: CD, LP, music download | 161 | — | 37 | — | 3 | 6 |
| The Saint of Lost Causes | Release date: May 24, 2019; Label: New West Records; Formats: CD, LP, music download | — | — | — | — | 9 | 23 |
| All In: Unreleased & Rarities (The New West Years) | Release date: August 9, 2024; Label: New West Records; Formats: CD, LP, music download | — | — | — | — | 9 | 23 |
"—" denotes releases that did not chart/not relevant
