= Joshua Hedley =

American country music singer-songwriter, violinist, and guitarist

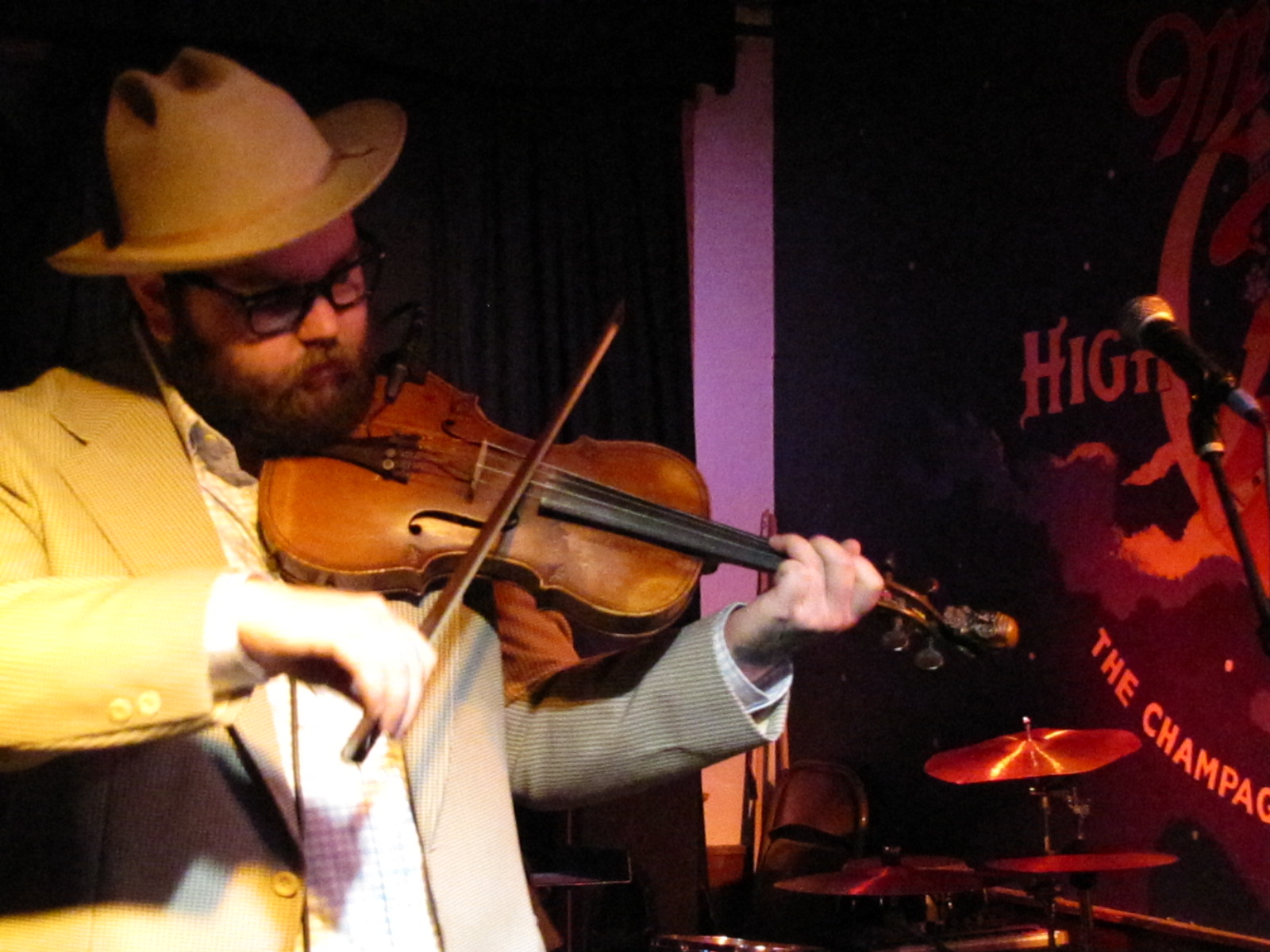
- With Justin Townes Earle; Knoxville, Tennessee; January 28, 2010

Background information
- Born: January 20, 1985 (age 41); Naples, Florida
- Genres: Neotraditional Country, Nashville Sound
- Occupation: musician
- Instruments: Guitar, violin, vocals
- Years active: 2004–present
- Label: Third Man
- Website: http://joshuahedley.com/

Joshua Hedley, born and raised in Naples, Florida, is a country music singer-songwriter, violinist, and guitarist. His debut album Mr. Jukebox was released in 2018 through Third Man Records.

== Biography ==
Joshua "Josh" Hedley was born and raised in Naples, Florida. He felt "inexplicably drawn" to the fiddle as a child, requesting one by name from his parents at 3. He got his first violin at 8. By 12, he was playing with "middle-aged pickers" at the local VFW. Hedley credits the "ear training" he received through learning the fiddle early in life has helped him become a better singer.

When he turned 19, he moved to Nashville where he became an "in-demand sideman" at Robert's Western World and other venues. He became known around the Lower Broad district of Nashville – where he developed his sound. "I always thought Josh was the best thing going on down on Broadway," says Margo Price, who used Hedley's fiddle on All American Made. "No one carries on the tradition the way Ol’ Hed does. He grew up in it, worked on his chops and earned his place in that world. Now the world gets to hear it."

He became known as "Mr. Jukebox" while playing down on Broad "thanks to Hedley's pristine vocals, unrivaled musicianship, and truly encyclopedic knowledge of country music." He's toured with artists such as Jonny Fritz, Justin Townes Earle, Willie Watson, and others. He was featured in the 2015 documentary Heartworn Highways Revisited. Hedley was listed as one of ten country music acts to watch by Rolling Stone magazine in November 2016.

Hedley was featured on an online variety show hosted by Ketch Secor of Old Crow Medicine Show on YouTube Live. The series has also featured Charlie Worsham and Molly Tuttle.

Hedley "maintains a Monday night residency" at Robert's Western World in Nashville, performing there weekly. Margo Price's version of "Ragged Old Truck", featuring Hedley, was released November 2022 on Live Forever: A Tribute To Billy Joe Shaver by New West Records. Also contributing to the 12-song set were Willie Nelson and Lucinda Williams, George Strait, Miranda Lambert, Nathaniel Rateliff, Steve Earle, and Rodney Crowell.

=== Sobriety ===
Hedley started writing his own songs after getting sober. As he says of this change in his life:

Sobriety led to ideas. Before that, I really wasn't interested in anything other than getting drunk. And the idea of writing a song never even crossed my mind. I had written a couple of them on the spur of the moment. But once I got sober, it opened up a door in my brain to where all these ideas were. They just kept coming. I couldn't write them fast enough.

=== Livestreaming ===
On March 17, 2020, Hedley and his group the Hedliners, together with Dave Cox, played their first livestreamed show at Robert's Western World, where he'd performed "thousands of times" since 2005. Playing to an empty dance floor, after area bars and music venues were shut down in response to the COVID-19 virus threat, Hedley and his musicians made more in virtual Venmo and PayPal tips from fans worldwide than they would on a regular night at the venue.

The performance garnered 53,000 views online within a few days, far more exposure than the 200-fan maximum venue could generate on a given night.

=== Festivals ===
Hedley headlined the ISOL-AID festival with Leah Flanagan and Wilco’s Jeff Tweedy in May 2020. He appears September 2022 at AmericanaFest in Nashville, sharing stage with such acts as Lukas Nelson, Taj Majal, and Lori McKenna.

== Mr. Jukebox ==
Hedley released his debut album Mr. Jukebox in 2018. It was named for his "uncanny ability to perform nearly any classic-country song thrown his way."

=== Tracks ===
- Counting All My Tears (3:15)
- Mr. Jukebox (3:16)
- Weird Thought Thinker (2:57)
- Let's Take a Vacation (3:51)
- These Walls (2:49)
- I Never (Shed a Tear) (2:14)
- This Time (2:36)
- Don't Waste Your Tears (3:59)
- Let Them Talk (1:59)
- When You Wish Upon a Star (2:59)

=== Reception ===
Hedley is driven by a similar goal: to make music that honors tradition in a personal and heartfelt way.

— Ann Powers, NPR

Hedley's got a voice that could sing the phonebook and make it sound like a Sixties gem straight from Billy Sherrill's lost 1960s archives . .

— Rolling Stone

Hedley, an old-school country singer, songwriter and fiddler whose sound recalls Johnny Paycheck and Merle Haggard, has spent years paying his dues in Nashville. Now it's time for the rest of the world to take notice.

— The Tennessean

Mr. Jukebox . . positioned Hedley as an unabashed revivalist, crafting a meticulous, loving re-creation of the heyday of the Nashville Sound, layering supple strings and vocal harmonies over the steady clomp of tic-tac bass.

— Stephen Thomas Erlewine, Pitchfork

== Neon Blue ==
Hedley released his second album Neon Blue in 2022. He has said that Neon Blue sounds like a mid-‘90s honky-tonk anthem. "The last bastion of country music was the early 1990s, roughly 1989 and 1996," Hedley said. "You could turn on the radio and immediately know you’re hearing a country song. You could still hear steel guitar and fiddle." Joe Diffie's death from COVID-19 in 2020 was the primary inspiration for the album, according to Hedley, who says of the effort: "After these last couple years we’ve had, I felt like I didn’t want to hang my sad-sack, typical brand on people. I wanted to make a record that people could party to."

=== Tracks ===
- Broke Again
- Country & Western
- Old Heartbroke Blues
- The Last Thing in the World
- Down to My Last Lie
- Free (One Heart)
- Neon Blue
- Bury Me With My Boots On
- Found in a Bar
- Let's Make a Memory
- Wonder If You Wonder
- River in the Rain

Where modern country music is designed to be pumped out of high-end systems at anonymous, brightly-lit sports bars, Hedley is making music for dives. No top shelf liquor or sleek product placements for Hedley: He’s down at the corner beer joint, drinking whatever’s on tap, in the can or in the bottle.

— Stephen Thomas Erlewine, Pitchfork

== Style ==
Hedley has said that country music was perfected in 1965, a statement he admits "was a bit hyperbolic." He continues:

Honestly, it's just my favorite era. Country music seems to change every 10 years or so and that Nashville Sound being pioneered by guys like Chet Atkins, Owen Bradley and Billy Sherrill just really speaks to me. But there are things I like about all eras of country music from Jimmie Rodgers to Ronnie Milsap. And my favorites change all the time, I just seem to be firmly planted in the Nashville Sound lately.

== All Hat ==
Joshua's third album is his take on Western swing. All Hat was produced by Ray Benson of Asleep At The Wheel, with numerous members of that band participating in the recordings.

=== Tracks ===
- All Hat (No Cattle)
- Boogie Woogie Tennessee
- Fresh Hot Biscuits
- Stuck in Texas (feat. Ray Benson)
- Hedliner Polka
- Come Take A Ride With Me
- Clueless
- Mean Mama Blues
- Crawlin' Home To You
- The Waltz I Promised To You
- Over The Line

== Discography ==
- Mr. Jukebox Third Man Records (2018)
- Neon Blue New West Records (2022)
- All Hat New West Records (2025)

== Film ==
- Heartworn Highways Revisited documentary (2015)
