= Bryn Davies (musician) =

American musician (born 1976)

- Born: August 22, 1976 (age 48)
- Origin: Livermore, California, US
- Genres: Americana; Bluegrass; Roots Rock
- Instrument(s): Double bass, cello, piano, vocals

Bryn Davies (born August 22, 1976) is an American bassist, cellist, and occasional pianist.

== Career ==
In 1997, she majored in jazz Performance at the Berklee College of Music in Boston, Massachusetts. There she met mandolin player Billy Bright and guitarist Brian Smith, with whom she formed the Two High String Band. In 1997, Bryn began working with Peter Rowan as the Texas Trio, which toured the US and eventually would become the Peter Rowan & Tony Rice Quartet.

In 2004, Davies moved to Nashville, Tennessee. From January to August 2007 she worked with Patty Griffin on the Children Running Through tour. Davies has an extensive discography, and has recorded with Guy Clark, The Peter Rowan & Tony Rice Quartet, Old and & In the Way, and Don Edwards. She has toured with Marty Stuart, The Tony Rice Unit, Darrell Scott, Guy Clark, Steve Earle, Jim Lauderdale and Shawn Camp. Along with her many studio and side projects, Davies currently tours with Darrell Scott, Jack White and Scott Miller.

== Discography ==
- Blunderbuss (Jack White)
- Somedays The Song Writes You (w/ Guy Clark)
- Songs and Stories (w/ Guy Clark)
- Workbench Songs (w/ Guy Clark)
- Beautiful Dream (w/ Steve Conn)
- Send It Down (w/ Kai Welch)
- This Land: Woody Guthrie's America (w/ John McCutcheon)
- Passage (w/ John McCutcheon)
- Quartet (w/ Peter Rowan and Tony Rice)
- You Were There For Me (w/ Peter Rowan and Tony Rice)
- Old & In the Gray (w/ Old & In the Gray)
- Generation Nation (w/ Republic of Strings)
- Megan McCormick (w/ Megan McCormick)
- Could We Get Any Closer? (w/ Jim Lauderdale)
- The Good Life (w/ Justin Townes Earle)
- Midnight at the Movies (w/ Justin Townes Earle)
- Harlem River Blues (w/ Justin Townes Earle)
- Nothing's Gonna Change The Way You Feel About Me Now (w/Justin Townes Earle)
- Between Us (w/ Peter Bradley Adams)
- Traces (w/ Peter Bradley Adams)
- Jedd Hughes (w/ Jedd Hughes)
- High Lonesome Cowboy (w/Don Edwards and Peter Rowan)
- Ford Turrell (w/Ford Turrell)
- Roseanna (w/Marcus Hummon)
- Lazaretto (w/Jack White)
