= Aaron Sterling =

American drummer

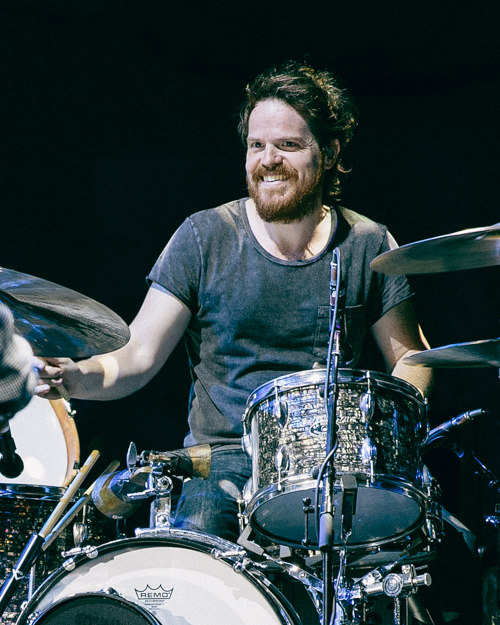
- Sterling at Red Rocks Amphitheater in 2013

Background information
- Born: July 9, 1980 (age 46)
- Origin: Garland, Texas, United States
- Genres: Rock, pop, country, jazz
- Occupations: Drummer, session musician
- Instruments: Drums, percussion, keyboards
- Years active: 2002–present
- Website: www.aaronsterling.com

Aaron Sterling (born July 9, 1980) is an American drummer, producer, engineer, and session musician who lives in Los Angeles and Nashville, Tennessee. The son of professional musicians, Sterling grew up in Texas and Nashville, before moving to L.A. in 2000. Sterling is a session musician who has performed on recordings for John Mayer, Taylor Swift, Harry Styles, Post Malone, Lana Del Rey, Madison Cunningham, Keith Urban, Ben Rector, Lizzy McAlpine, and Maren Morris.

Sterling contributed drums to Mayer's albums Born and Raised (2012), Paradise Valley (2013), and Sob Rock (2021). He was a member of Mayer's touring band for the Born and Raised World Tour (2013–2014) and subsequent tours in 2019 and 2022. Sterling also appeared in the music videos for "Queen of California", Carry Me Away, and Last Train Home.

== Equipment ==
Sterling uses equipment from Sugar Percussion, Istanbul Agop Cymbals, Pro-Mark, and Evans Drumheads.

== Discography ==
=== 2000s ===
Year	Artist	Album	Instrument
2004	Tomandandy	Mean Creek (Motion Picture soundtrack)	Drums
2004	Tremolo	Love Is the Greatest Revenge	Drums, Percussion
2005	Kevin Max	The Imposter	Drums
2005	Emma Roberts	Unfabulous and More	Drums
2005	Liz Phair	Somebody's Miracle	Drums, Percussion
2005	Rosie Thomas	If Songs Could Be Held	Drums, Percussion
2006	Brooke Fraser	Albertine	Drums, Percussion
2007	Kalan Porter	Wake Up Living	Drums
2007	Pat Monahan	Last of Seven	Drums, Percussion
2007	Kate Voegele	Don't Look Away	Drums
2007	Jaymay	Autumn Fallin'	Drums, Percussion
2007	Blake Lewis	A.D.D. (Audio Day Dream)	Drums
2008	Matt Wertz	Under Summer Sun	Drums
2008	William Fitzsimmons	The Sparrow and the Crow	Drums, Percussion
2008	Natasha Bedingfield	Pocketful of Sunshine	Drums
2008	Victor & Leo	Nada Es Normal	Bateria
2008	Lenka	Lenka	Drums
2008	Ha*Ash	Habitación Doble	Bateria
2008	David Archuleta	David Archuleta	Drums
2009	Landon Pigg	The Boy Who Never	Drums
2009	Matt Hires	Take Us to the Start	Drums
2009	Miranda Lee Richards	Light of X	Drums
2009	Kris Allen	Kris Allen	Drums
2009	Various Artists	Dean Martin: My Kind of Christmas	Drums
2009	Caitlin Crosby	Flawz	Drums, Percussion
2009	El Sueño de Morfeo	Cosas que nos hacen sentir bien	Bateria
2009	Mat Kearney	City of Black & White	Drums
2009	Kany García	Boleto de Entrada	Bateria
2009	Various Artists	The Best Is Yet to Come: The Songs of Cy Coleman	Drums
2009	Kelly Clarkson	All I Ever Wanted	Drums
2009	Kate Voegele	A Fine Mess	Drums

=== 2010s ===
Year	Artist	Album	Instrument
2010	Brian Ray	This Way Up	Drums, Percussion, Shaker
2010	Natasha Bedingfield	Strip Me	Drums, Percussion
2010	Jason Castro	Jason Castro	Drums, Percussion
2010	Lucy Woodward	Hooked	Drums
2010	Donavon Frankenreiter	Glow	Drums, Boards, Percussion
2010	Dulce María	Extranjera: Primera Parte	Bateria
2010	Zucchero	Chocabeck	Drums, Percussion
2010	Rusty Anderson	Born on Earth	Drums
2010	Alex, Jorge y Lena	Alex, Jorge Y Lena	Bateria
2010	Paty Cantú	Afortunadamente No Eres Tú	Bateria
2011	Pixie Lott	Young Foolish Happy	Drums
2011	Kimberly Caldwell	Without Regret	Drums, Percussion
2011	Leonel García	Tú	Bateria
2011	Gavin DeGraw	Sweeter	Drums
2011	Dia Frampton	Red	Drums
2011	Gabe Dixon	One Spark	Drums, Percussion
2011	Matt Nathanson	Modern Love	Drums, Percussion
2011	Various Artists	Listen to Me: Buddy Holly	Drums, Percussion
2011	Foreigner	Jukebox Heroes	Drums
2011	Glen Campbell	Ghost on the Canvas	Drums
2011	Foreigner	Feels Like the First Time	Drums
2011	Dulce María	Extranjera: Segunda Parte	Bateria
2011	Trevor Hall	Everything Everytime Everywhere	Drums
2011	Ha*Ash	A Tiempo	Bateria
2012	Regina Spektor	What We Saw from the Cheap Seats	Drums, Mariachi Arrangement, Percussion
2012	Meiko	The Bright Side	Drums
2012	Natalie D-Napoleon	Leaving Me Dry	Drums, Percussion
2012	Cast of Nashville	The Music of Nashville: Season 1 Volume 1	Brushes
2012	Kris Allen	Thank You Camellia	Drums
2012	Taylor Swift	Red	Drums
2012	Haley Reinhart	Listen Up!	Drums
2012	Whitney Wolanin	Let's Be Honest Pt. 1	Drums
2012	Alejandro Sanz	La Música No Se Toca (En Vivo)	Bateria
2012	Kany García	Kany García	Bateria
2012	Selena	Enamorada de Ti	Bateria
2012	Eme 15	EME-15	Bateria
2012	Ednita Nazario	Desnuda	Bateria
2012	Antonio Orozco	D1ez	Bateria
2012	John Mayer	Born and Raised	Drums, Percussion
2012	Richie Sambora	Aftermath of the Lowdown	Drums, Percussion
2013	The Civil Wars	The Civil Wars	Cymbals, Drums
2013	Sara Bareilles	The Blessed Unrest	Drums, Percussion
2013	Joseph Arthur	The Ballad of Boogie Christ	Drums
2013	Brett Dennen	Smoke and Mirrors	Congas, Drums Percussion
2013	Various Artists	Red: Taylor Swift Karaoke	Drums
2013	The Band Perry	Pioneer	Drums
2013	John Mayer	Paradise Valley	Drums, Percussion
2013	Emblem3	Nothing to Lose	Drums
2013	Natalie Maines	Mother	Drums
2013	Steve Martin	Love Has Come for You	Cajon, Drums, Hand Clapping, Percussion
2013	Gungor	I Am Mountain	Drums, Percussion
2013	Cassadee Pope	Frame by Frame	Drums
2013	Kris Kristofferson	Feeling Mortal	Drums
2013	Carlos Baute	En el Buzon de Tu Corazón	Bateria, Engineer
2013	Cristian Castro	En Primera Filla: Día 1 (Live album)	Bateria
2014	David Bisbal	Tú y Yo	Bateria
2014	Pablo Alboran	Terral	Bateria
2014	Lily Allen	Sheezus	Drum Engineering, Drums
2014	Shakira	Shakira	Drums
2014	Dan Wilson	Love Without Fear	Drums
2014	Various Artists	Legends of Oz: Dorothy's Return (Motion Picture soundtrack)	Drums
2014	Foreigner	I Want to Know What Love Is: The Ballads	Drums
2014	Cristian Castro	En Primera Filla: Día 2 (Live album)	Bateria
2018	Andrés Calamaro	Cargar la suerte	Batería
2019	Eva Celia	Lifeline: Introduction	Drums
2019	Harry Styles	Fine Line	Drums & Percussion

=== 2020s ===
Year	Artist	Album	Instrument
2020	Shawn Mendes	Wonder	Drums
2020	Pablo Alborán	Vertigo	Drums, Engineer
2020	Various Artists	Ven A Cantar [Chorus TikTok 3]	Drum
2020	Pablo López	Unikornio Once Millones De Versos Despues De Ti	Drums
2020	Dustin Lynch	Tullahoma	Drums, Drum Engineering
2020	Caitlyn Smith	Supernova	Drums, Percussion
2020	Russell Dickerson	Southern Symphony	Drums
2020	Various Artists	Soundtrack to Summer 2020	Drums, Recording
2020	Caylee Hammack	Small Town Hypocrite	Drums, Engineer, Percussion
2020	Various Artists	Pride Month	Drums
2020	Noah Schnacky	Noah Schnacky EP	Drums
2020	Various Artists	NOW Country: Songs of Inspiration, Vol. 2	Drums
2020	Kane Brown	Mixtape, Vol. 1	Drums, Percussion
2020	Caylee Hammack	If It Wasn't for You	Drums, Engineer, Percussion
2020	Rascal Flatts	How They Remember You	Drums, Recording
2020	Various Artists	Hope: Songs of Love and Strength	Drums
2020	Lee Brice	Hey World	Drums, Engineer
2020	Niall Horan	Heartbreak Weather	Drums, Percussion
2020	Lindsay Ell	Heart Theory	Drums
2020	Rhett Walker	Good to Me	Drums, Engineer, Percussion
2020	Noah Schnacky	Feels Like Love	Drums
2020	Noah Schnacky	Comeback	Drums
2020	Various Artists	Big Machine Dance Party	Drums, Percussion
2020	Various Artists	Best of the Year 2020	Drums, Percussion

Year	Artist	Album	Instrument
2021	Quinn Sullivan	Wide Awake	Drums, Percussion
2021	Lady A	What a Song Can Do	Drums
2021	Brett Young	Weekends Look a Little Different These Days	Drums, Percussion
2021	James Blunt	The Stars Beneath My Feet [2004-2021]	Drums
2021	Tomorrow X Together	The Chaos Chapter: Freeze	Drums, Engineer
2021	Tomorrow X Together	The Chaos Chapter: Fight or Escape	Drums, Engineer
2021	Various Artists	The Jesus Music Soundtrack	Drums
2021	John Mayer	Sob Rock	Drums, Percussion
2021	Mickey Guyton	Remember Her Name	Drums, Percussion
2021	Taylor Swift	Red [Taylor's Version]	Drum, Drums, Engineer, Percussion, Programming, Recording
2021	Callista Clark	Real to Me	Drums
2021	TobyMac	Promised Land	Drums
2021	Antonio Orozco	Pedacitos De Mi	Drums
2021	Niall Horan	Niall's Mix	Drums, Percussion
2021	Anne Wilson	My Jesus [Live in Nashville]	Drums
2021	Crowder / Anne Wilson	My Jesus	Drums
2021	Dierks Bentley	Make My World Go Black	Drums
2021	Laci Kaye Booth	Laci Kaye Booth	Drums, Percussion
2021	Fitz	Head Up High	Drums
2021	Antonio José	Fenix	Drums, Recording
2021	Explorer Tapes	Explorer Tapes	Drums, Percussion
2021	JP Saxe	Dangerous Levels of Introspection	Drums
2021	Various Artists	Cozy Christmas [November, 2021]	Drums, Engineer, Percussion
2021	Lana Del Rey	Chemtrails over the Country Club	Bongos, Drums, Tambourine
2021	Tomorrow X Together	Chaotic Wonderland [09-11-2021]	Drums, Engineer
2021	Various Artists	Best Country Valentine's Day	Drums, Percussion
2021	Jordan Smith	Be Still & Know	Engineer, Drums, Percussion, Programming
2021	David Bisbal	20 Anos Contigo	Drums
2021	Alfred García	1997	Drums, Recording
2021	Sam Hunt	23	Drums, Percussion
2021	Nick Johnston	Young Language	Drums

Year	Artist	Album	Instrument
2022	Ben Rector	Wonderful World	Percussion, Piano
2022	Nick Phoenix	Wide World	Drums
2022	Ben Rector	What Makes a Man	Drums, Percussion
2022	Tyler Dial	Way Back When	Drums, Percussion, Recording
2022	Tears for Fears	The Tipping Point	Drums
2022	TobyMac	The Goodness	Drums
2022	Maggie Rogers	Surrender	Drums
2022	Keith Urban	Street Called Main	Drums
2022	Brett Eldredge	Songs About You	Drums, Percussion
2022	Madeline Merlo	Slide	Drums
2022	Various Artists	Sing 2 [Original Soundtrack]	Drums
2022	Madison Cunningham	Revealer	Drums, Percussion
2022	Taylor Swift	Red [Taylor's Version]: The Slow Motion Chapter	Drums, Percussion, Programming, Recording
2022	Taylor Swift	Red [Taylor's Version]: Could You Be the One Chapter	Drums, Percussion, Programming, Recording
2022	Sheryl Crow / TobyMac	Promised Land	Drums
2022	Anne Wilson	My Jesus	Drums
2022	Various Artists	Momento Relax	Drums
2022	TobyMac	Life After Death	Drum, Drums, Percussion
2022	Brett Young	In Case You Didn't Know: The Love Songs	Drums
2022	Danielle Bradbery	In Between: The Collection	Drums, Percussion
2022	Brett Eldredge	I Feel Fine	Drums, Percussion
2022	Niall Horan	Hello Lovers Mix	Drums, Percussion
2022	Abbey Cone	Hate Me	Drums, Percussion, Recording
2022	Dierks Bentley	Gold	Drums, Percussion
2022	TobyMac	Everything About You	Drums
2022	Amos Lee	Dreamland	Drums
2022	Chayce Beckham	Doin' It Right	Drums
2022	Carrie Underwood	Denim & Rhinestones	Drums, Percussion
2022	Blessing Offor	Brighter Days	Drums, Percussion
2022	Dustin Lynch	Blue in the Sky	Drums, Drum Engineering, Engineer
2022	Brooke Annibale	Better by Now	Engineer, Drums, Percussion
2022	Chris Tomlin	Always	Drums, Percussion
2022	Andrea Bocelli / Matteo Bocelli / Virginia Bocelli	A Family Christmas	Percussion

Year	Artist	Album	Instrument
2023	Carly Pearce	We Don't Fight Anymore	Drums, Percussion
2023	P!nk	Trustfall	Drums, Engineer
2023	Antonio Orozco	Tocar el Corazon	Drums
2023	Joseph	The Sun	Drums, Engineer, Percussion
2023	Cody Fry	Symphonic	Drums, Percussion
2023	Tomorrow X Together	Sweet	Drums, Engineer
2023	Claud	Supermodels	Drums, Percussion
2023	Scot Sier	Space and Other Things	Drums, Engineer
2023	Joy Oladokun	Proof of Life	Drums, Percussion
2023	Jordyn Shellhart	Primrose	Drums, Percussion
2023	Blessing Offor	My Tribe	Drums, Percussion
2023	Dierks Bentley	Gravel & Gold	Drums, Percussion, Programming
2023	Wilder Woods	Fever/Sky	Drums, Percussion
2023	Brett Young	Dance With You	Drums
2023	Danielle Bradbery	Behind the Songs: In Between - The Collection	Drums, Percussion
