= Live at the Fillmore (Lucinda Williams album) =

Live @ The Fillmore

Live album by Lucinda Williams
- Released: May 10, 2005
- Recorded: November 20–22, 2003
- Genre: Americana, alternative country, country rock, folk-rock, heartland rock, blues rock
- Length: 115:36
- Label: Lost Highway
- Producer: Lucinda Williams; Taras Prodaniuk

Lucinda Williams chronology
World Without Tears (2003)	Live @ The Fillmore (2005)	West (2007)

Live at the Fillmore (stylized as Live @ The Fillmore) is a live album by American singer-songwriter Lucinda Williams, her eighth album overall, released on May 10, 2005, by Lost Highway Records.

Recorded in November 2003 during a three-night stand in San Francisco, the double album was met with critical acclaim, and debuted at No. 66 on the Billboard 200.

== Critical reception ==
Professional ratings
Aggregate scores
Source	Rating
Metacritic	73/100
Review scores
Source	Rating
AllMusic	link
Blender	link
Pitchfork Media	(7.3/10) link
Rolling Stone	link

At Metacritic, which assigns a weighted average rating out of 100 to reviews from mainstream publications, the album received an average score of 73, based on 12 reviews. Critic Robert Christgau rated it highly for the live performance, but criticized it for only containing album tracks, including 11 from her previous album, 2003's World Without Tears. In his written review, Christgau stated "There's no point questioning Lucinda Williams's talent, or her perfectionism. Of course her first live album sounds dandy. There isn't a bad song or performance on it. Unfortunately, there isn't a new song or performance on it either".

AllMusic rated the album 4 out of a possible 5 stars, writing "as Williams searches through the nooks and crannies of her songs, you sense she's discovering things that she didn't expect to find, and it's a tremendous thing to hear," concluding that she "is an artist who writes from her soul, and she's thoroughly unafraid of letting her passion show when she sings. If that makes for strained technique, it also results in very real art, and this album offers a privileged glimpse of a singular songwriter in full flight".

== Track listing ==
All tracks written by Lucinda Williams.

Disc one
No.	Title	Length
1.	"Ventura"	5:06
2.	"Reason to Cry"	4:22
3.	"Fruits of My Labor"	5:04
4.	"Out of Touch"	7:21
5.	"Sweet Side"	4:45
6.	"Lonely Girls"	4:27
7.	"Overtime"	4:17
8.	"Blue"	4:16
9.	"Prove My Love"	4:22
10.	"Changed the Locks"	4:07
11.	"Atonement"	5:58

Disc two
No.	Title	Length
1.	"I Lost It"	3:27
2.	"Pineola"	4:04
3.	"Righteously"	4:45
4.	"Joy"	8:19
5.	"Essence"	7:16
6.	"Real Live Bleeding Fingers and Broken Guitar Strings"	4:57
7.	"Are You Down"	6:29
8.	"Those Three Days"	5:02
9.	"American Dream"	5:23
10.	"World Without Tears"	4:42
11.	"Bus to Baton Rouge"	6:26
12.	"Words Fell"	4:34

Digital Bonus EP
No.	Title	Length
1.	"Passionate Kisses"	2:53
2.	"I Just Wanted to See You So Bad"	2:19
3.	"Still I Long For Your Kiss"	4:57
4.	"Metal Firecracker"	3:41

== Personnel ==
- Lucinda Williams – vocals, acoustic and electric guitar
- Doug Pettibone – lead guitars, pedal & lap steel guitars, mandolin, harmonica, background vocals
- Taras Prodaniuk – bass, background vocals
- Jim Christie – drums, percussion, keys

== Charts ==
Chart performance for Live at the Fillmore
Chart (2005)	Peak position
Australian Albums (ARIA)	110
Dutch Albums (Album Top 100)	69
Italian Albums (FIMI)	46
Swedish Albums (Sverigetopplistan)	43
US Billboard 200	66
