= Real Love (Lucinda Williams song) =

2008 single by Lucinda Williams

Single by Lucinda Williams

from the album Little Honey
- Released: 2008
- Genre: Americana; folk rock; alternative country; heartland rock
- Length: 3:45 (Album version)
- Label: Lost Highway
- Songwriter(s): Lucinda Williams
- Producer(s): Eric Leljestrand; Tom Overby

Lucinda Williams singles chronology
"Are You Alright?" (2007)	"Real Love" (2008)	"Buttercup" (2011)

"Real Love" is a song written and performed by American singer-songwriter Lucinda Williams. It was released in 2008 as the first single from her ninth album, Little Honey (2008).

The song was featured in the film The Lucky Ones, released in the US on September 26, 2008.

== Reception ==
In their review of Little Honey, Spin stated "Williams goes back to the roots-rock well and takes a long, satisfying swig", and referred to "Real Love" as a "rowdy bar-band rave-up." AllMusic called it "rollicking, with jangling, charging guitars by Doug Pettibone, and Rob Burger on Wurlitzer, and a backing chorus held down by the Bangles' Susanna Hoffs and Matthew Sweet. Its pop/rock bent is tempered by the roiling pace and Williams's trademark Louisiana voice." Rolling Stone singled out the track; "amid boogie-rock riffing, she alternately pledges her heart to a guy, a girl, and an electric guitar. Little Honey proves she's still crushed out on the music."

LA Weekly ranked "Real Love" at No. 3 on their list of Williams' best 11 songs, calling it a "return to the jangle pop/country days of old".

== Track listing ==
CD single

- Radio Edit - 3:13

== Charts ==
Chart (2001)	Peak position
Australia (ARIA)	297
US Billboard Adult Alternative Airplay	22
