= Leaving Me Dry =

Studio album by Natalie D-Napoleon
- Released: July 02, 2012
- Recorded: 2009
- Genre: Americana, folk
- Length: 41:40
- Label: Household Ink
- Producer: David Piltch, Natalie D-Napoleon

Natalie D-Napoleon chronology
After the Flood (2008)	Leaving Me Dry (2012)	You Wanted To Be The Shore But Instead You Were The Sea (2020)

Leaving Me Dry is the debut solo album by American/Australian singer/songwriter Natalie D-Napoleon. The album was recorded in Santa Barbara, California in 2009 and produced by David Piltch. It was released in Australia, North America, and Europe in 2012.

== Reception ==
Professional ratings
Review scores
Source	Rating
No Depression	(positive)
Santa Barbara Independent	(positive)

In reviewing the album No Depression opined that recording the album in Santa Barbara, California with local musicians "turned out to be a stroke of musical genius" and noting that David Piltch's production "allowed the collective to flex its musical might at will" while keeping "D-Napoleon's gorgeous vocals and heartfelt lyrical message center stage." In writing for the Santa Barbara Independent Aly Comingore called the album "a record that's as listenable as it is emotionally charged" and "a triumph for one of Santa Barbara's brightest stars."

== Production ==
In 2008 D-Napoleon was awarded a Western Australia Department of Culture and the Arts Music Production Grant to record an album in Santa Barbara, California.

The album was recorded at Santa Barbara Sound Design in Santa Barbara and Early Pro Studios in Los Angeles in May and June, 2009. Along with Piltch and D-Napoleon's regular band members, Dan Phillips and Kenny Edwards, the album also features Greg Leisz, Phil Parlapiano, Victoria Williams, and Aaron Sterling.

== Track listing ==
All songs by Natalie D-Napoleon, except where noted.

1. "How Can I Love You So?" (D-Napoleon, Grant Ferstat) - 3:23
2. "The Deep Blue Sky" - 4:51
3. "The Well Song" - 3:26
4. "With The Speed Of Love (Memories Become Traces Of Tears) - 1:58
5. "Leaving Me Dry" - 4:09
6. "Leave A Light On" - 4:42
7. "Remember To Breathe" (D-Napoleon, Ferstat) - 5:05
8. "The Birds And The Trees" - 4:07
9. "Don't Be Scared" (D-Napoleon, Ferstat) - 3:30
10. "so brand new" - 3:15
11. "The Road" - 3:08

== Personnel ==
- Natalie D-Napoleon - vocals, acoustic guitar, papoose
- David Piltch - upright bass, electric bass
- Kenny Edwards - acoustic guitar, electric guitar, mandolin
- Dan Phillips - piano, Hammond B3, background vocals
- Aaron Sterling - drums, percussion
- Greg Leisz - pedal steel
- Victoria Williams - banjo, background vocals
- Phil Parlapiano - accordion, banjo
- Melanie Robinson - cello
- Evan Hillhouse - Wurlitzer
- Jesse Rhodes - background vocals

== Production notes ==
- David Piltch – producer
- Natalie D-Napoleon - producer
- Lynne Earls – engineer, mixing
- David Locke – mastering
- Brett Leigh Dicks – photography
- Donna Cameron - design
