= Get Right With God =

2001 single by Lucinda Williams

Single by Lucinda Williams

from the album Essence
- Released: 2001
- Genre: Blues rock; alternative country
- Length: 4:16
- Label: Lost Highway
- Songwriter: Lucinda Williams
- Producers: Bo Ramsey; Tom Tucker; Lucinda Williams

Lucinda Williams singles chronology
"Essence" (2001)	"Get Right With God" (2001)	"Righteously" (2003)

"Get Right With God" is a song written and performed by American singer-songwriter Lucinda Williams. It was released in 2001 as the second single from her sixth album, Essence (2001).

The song earned Williams the Grammy Award for Best Female Rock Vocal Performance in 2002.

== Content ==
A review of the song from AllMusic stated: "Lucinda Williams, an expert conjurer of Southern imagery, sees the light with the shuffling backwoods, revivalist stomp of 'Get Right With God'. Williams proclaims her need for a good soul cleansing, 'Cause I want to get right with God/Yes, you know you got to get right with God'. The last verse hints that this seemingly all-consuming search for redemption may be a bit tongue-in-cheek, Williams simply mining the colorful history and rich cultural imagery of the American South as she queries, 'I asked God about his plan/To save us all from Satan's slaughter/If I give up one of my lambs/Will you take me as one of your daughters?"

Singer-songwriter Joy Lynn White provided harmony backing vocals on the track.

== Reception ==
Spin referred to "Get Right With God" as an "odd mock-gospel worksong", while Salon wrote "By contrast, "Get Right With God" burns as hot as "Essence," though the hellfire here is spiritual rather than sexual. Even Williams attempts to distance herself as she instructs the musicians to "Get da-own!" (in a caricature of a cracker accent), yet the intensity of the plain-spoken, guitar-driven prayer transcends parody. Sin and salvation aren't conceptual abstracts but palpably physical, and one is as likely to burn from the former as yearn for the latter."

Country music website The Boot ranked the song No. 10 on their list of the best Lucinda Williams songs, describing it as a "deceptively low-key, country-flecked number", writing that it "seems like a rather self-explanatory song. The protagonist is willing to make sacrifices to 'get right with God' and go to heaven. The underlying message, however, is that this faith is less about deep-seated belief and more about surface action — which means the song can be read as a subtle criticism of modern religion." NPR wrote that the song "inspired one of her most astounding vocal performances", and observed "Gospel music is a central, if under-discussed, inspiration for Williams. Here she makes the connection clear in a driving account of faith's relationship to audacity and risk."

== Track listing ==
CD single - US

- Radio Remix - 3:38
- Radio Edit Without Intro - 3:00
- Album Version - 4:16

CD single - Europe

- Radio Remix - 3:35
- Album Version - 4:16

== Awards ==
Year	Award	Category	Work	Recipient	Result	Ref.
2002	Grammy Award	Best Female Rock Vocal Performance	"Get Right With God"	Lucinda Williams	Won	
