= Natalie D-Napoleon =

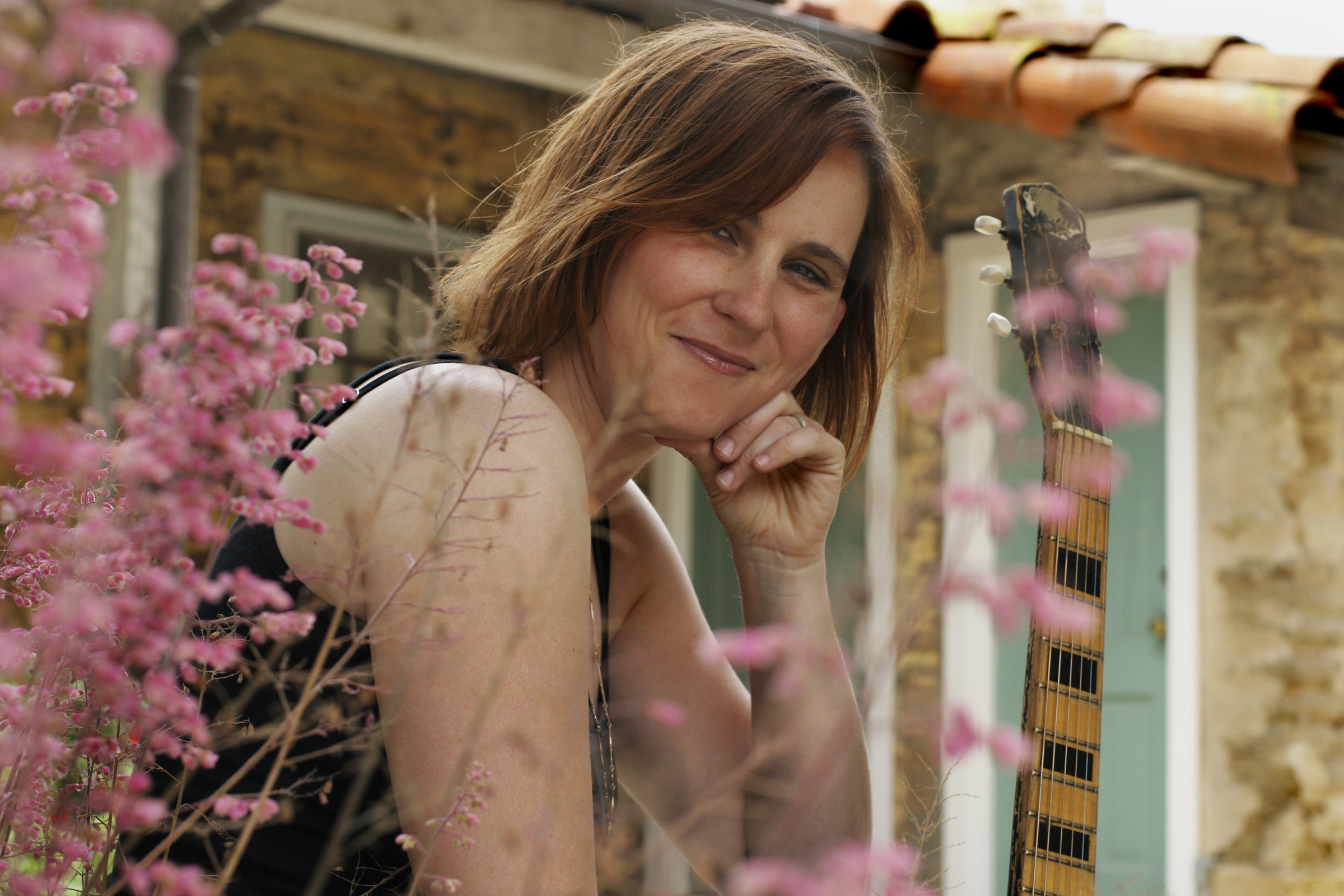

Background information
- Origin: Fremantle, Western Australia, Australia
- Genres: Folk, Country, Alternative country
- Occupations: Poet, teacher, singer-songwriter
- Instruments: vocals, guitar
- Years active: 1996–present
- Labels: Treadmill Records, Syrinx Music/MGM, Foghorn Records, Household Ink Records
- Website: www.nataliednapoleon.net

Dr Natalie Damjanovich-Napoleon, known professionally as Natalie D-Napoleon, is an Australian/American singer-songwriter, poet, writer and academic from Fremantle, Western Australia. Through fronting the Perth-based ensemble Flavour of the Month, she was a forerunner in the emergence of alternative country music within Australia and was the winner of the 2018 Bruce Dawe National Poetry Prize and the 2019 KSP Poetry Prize.

== Music ==
Natalie D-Napoleon's emergence upon the Western Australian music scene came via fronting the alternative pop band Bloom. In 1997 Bloom won the Western Australian Music Industry Award for Most Promising New Act.

Following the demise of Bloom, D-Napoleon, along with Month of Sunday's guitarist Grant Ferstat, formed an alternative country ensemble Flavour of the Month. The band's name was taken from the title of a song by The Posies from their album Frosting on the Beater. Flavour of the Month subsequently supported Ken Stringfellow of The Posies on one of his first solo tours of Australia. The band toured nationally in Australia as well undertaking tours of the United States and Europe.

During this period D-Napoleon also contributed backing vocals to several independent recordings including Road to Rome by DM3, which was one of the first solo albums by Dom Mariani after the hibernation of The Stems, and former Stonemason's frontman, Joe Algeri's, solo debut Everything Under The Sun, along with singing with alternative-country band, The Jayco Brothers, on their release Asbestos Fibro.

After the demise of Flavour in the Month in 2005, D-Napoleon started performing solo and in November 2007 released her debut solo recording, a five-track EP titled "After The Flood".

In 2009, D-Napoleon undertook two further solo recording. In April 2009 she collaborated with Santa Barbara-based musician and producer Jesse Rhodes on a six-track EP of cover versions. Titled Here in California the release features three songs from Australian composers and three songs from Americans. The recording features the collective talents of D-Napoleon, Rhodes, Kenny Edwards, Dan Phillips, Phil Parlapiano, and Sally Barr.

In May 2009, D-Napoleon started work on her debut solo album. Partly funded by a Western Australia Department of Culture and the Arts Music Production Grant, the album was recorded at Sound Design Studios in Santa Barbara and produced by David Piltch. The recording features the collective talents of Kenny Edwards, Dan Phillips, Aaron Sterling, Greg Leisz, Victoria Williams, Phil Parlapiano, Jesse Rhodes, and Melanie Robinson.

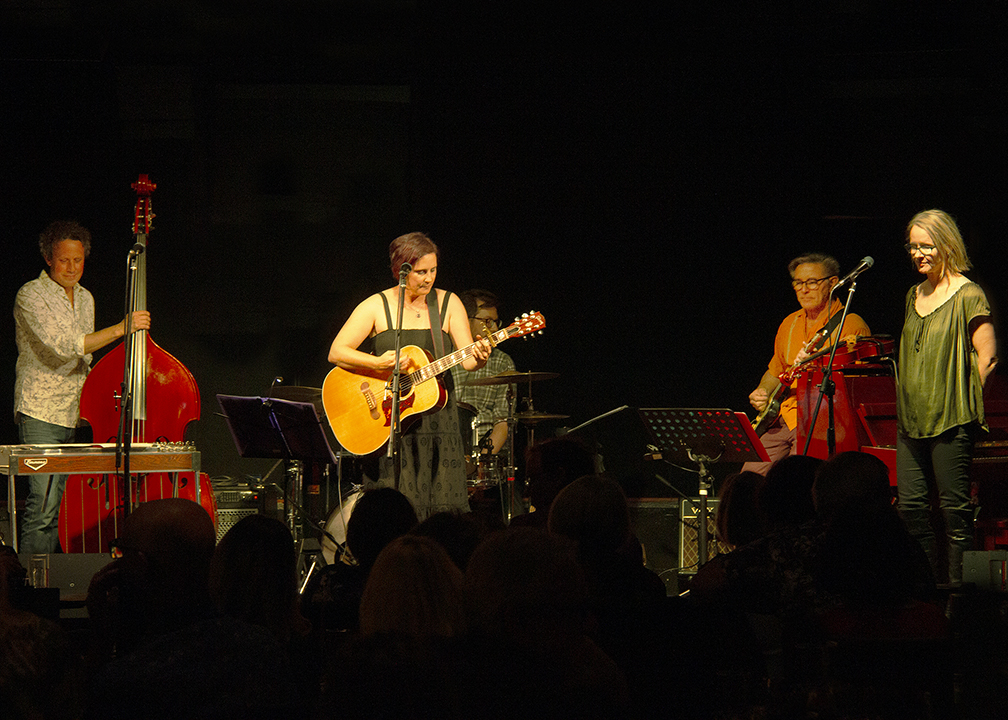
Ben Franz, Natalie D-Napoleon, Andy Pearson, Dave Brewer, and Cathi Olivieri performing at Fremantle's Duke of George in 2020.

Prior to returning permanently to Australia in 2019, D-Napoleon recorded a new album of material titled You Wanted To Be The Shore But Instead You Were The Sea. Produced by James Connolly and featuring Dan Phillips and Doug Pettibone, the album was recorded with a single microphone in a historic chapel nestled in the hills behind Santa Barbara. You Wanted To Be The Shore But Instead You Were The Sea was released in Australia on October 1, 2020 and debuted on the Australian Independent Record Labels Association (AIR) 100% Independent Chart at No. 5 for the week beginning October 6 and reached No. 1 on November 16.

In the live arena, D-Napoleon has performed in a number of different solo configurations. She formed a Santa Barbara-based trio with Dan Phillips on piano and percussion and Kenny Edwards on electric guitar and mandolin in 2007, pairing back to duo with Phillips after Edwards' passing in 2010. In 2014 D-Napoleon expanded the ensemble to a four-piece with the addition of James Connolly on bass and David Cowan on guitar with Doug Pettibone taking over on electric guitar and mandolin in 2019. In Australia D-Napoleon originally performed as a trio with Richard Lane on guitar and Cathi Olivieri on viola and recruited established bands, such as The Justin Walshe Folk Machine, to back her on tour. Since returning to Australia in 2019 D-Napoleon has performed as a trio with Olivieri on viola and piano and Michael Lane on banjo and mandolin, a quartet with the addition on Ben Franz on upright bass and pedal steel, and a full band with Dave Brewer on electric guitar and Andy Pearson on drums and percussion.

== Writing and poetry ==
Having had poetry and creative non-fiction work published in journals such as Westerly, Meanjin, Southerly, and Australian Poetry Journal, D-Napoleon was a finalist for the Penelope Niven Creative Nonfiction Award in the 2018 and 2017 International Literary Awards through the Salem College Center for Women Writers.

In 2018 D-Napoleon was awarded the Bruce Dawe National Poetry Prize for her poem "First Blood: A Sestina" and in 2019 her book, First Blood, was released through Ginninderra Press. Poet John Kinsella describes D-Napoleon's poem "First Blood: A Sestina" as "an unsettling poem. In it, the body is constantly reconfigured in the ironic light of its own formal creation—a critique of self and society in terms of the female body, a strong undoing of form working hand-in-hand with the application of that form, the sestina.” The poetry book, First Blood, includes a collection of poems-as-memoir that challenge the preconceptions of girlhood. In her review of the book for Westerly Magazine, Amy Lim said, "D-Napoleon tugs at these constructs with a gentle irony—never bitter, but approximating criticism with a grace that only poetry can achieve."

In 2019 D-Napoleon was the International Guest Poet at the 2019 Perth Poetry Festival and won the 2019 Katharine Susannah Prichard Poetry Award for her poem, "If There is a Butterfly That Drinks Tears." She was shortlisted for the 2024 Peter Porter Poetry Prize for "Immigration Triction". In 2023 her erasure and cut-up poem "O Human" appeared in Dear Human at the Edge of Time: Poems on Climate Change in the United States, alongside the work of US Poet Laureate Ada Limón.

Life Before Man Books (Gazebo Books) released her second poetry collection, If There is a Butterfly That Drinks Tears, in 2023, on motherhood and matrescence, which critic Ellie Fisher describes: “weaves the personal with the political: the result is a volume that feels best captured by one of the closing lines of her poem ‘Born of Woman’: ‘bodied, disembodied; we are forever unfolding in forward motion.' It is this push, this sense of motion, that moves this collection towards its readers."

She recently completed a PhD in Creative Writing at Edith Cowan University, titled The Commonwealth of Amnesia: A collection of erasure and cut-up poems exploring the forgotten histories of Croatian and Yugoslav peoples in Australia. The doctorate also includes an accompanying exegesis, Obliteration Creates More: examining the wreck of history through whiteout, blackout and cut-up erasure poetry. Her third poetry collection, The Commonwealth of Amnesia, an abridged version of her doctoral creative artefact, will be released by Rabbit Books in 2026.

== Personal life ==
Resides in Santa Barbara, California and Fremantle, Western Australia.

== Discography ==
=== Albums ===
- Leaving Me Dry (2012)
- You Wanted To Be The Shore But Instead You Were The Sea (2020)

=== EPs ===
- After The Flood (2007)
- Here in California (2009)

=== Singles ===
- Thunder Rumor (2020)
- Wildflowers (2021)
- You Wanted To Be The Shore But Instead You Were The Sea (2021)
- Gasoline & Liquor (2021)
- Mother of Exiles (2021)

=== As Bloom ===
- The Cable Thing (1997)

=== As Flavour of the Month ===
- Fear of Falling (2000)

=== Compilations ===
- Kiss My WAMI, "Daisygrinding", WAM (2001)
- Zipped Up and Down Under, "Daisygrinding", Zip Records (2001)
- Pop On Top, "Sweetness Melting", Zip Records, (2002)
- Dead Fox Compilation, "Slow Burn", Hooked Up Records (2008)
- HomeGrown Roots 3, "Slow Burn", Foghorn Records (2008)
- HomeGrown Roots 4, "To Her Door", Foghorn Records (2008)
- Sounds Like Cafe, "To Her Door", Foghorn Records (2009)
- Under the Covers, "You Shook Me All Night Long", ABC Music (2011)

=== Other recorded appearances ===
- Everything Under the Sun by Joe Algeri (1994)
- Road to Rome by DM3 (1996)
- Asbestos Fibro by The Jayco Brothers (2007)
