= World Without Tears =

Studio album by Lucinda Williams
- Released: April 8, 2003
- Genres: Rock and roll, roots rock, Americana, alternative, folk rock
- Length: 59:53
- Label: Lost Highway
- Producers: Mark Howard, Lucinda Williams

Lucinda Williams chronology
Essence (2001)	World Without Tears (2003)	Live @ The Fillmore (2005)

World Without Tears is the seventh studio album by American singer-songwriter Lucinda Williams, released on April 8, 2003, by Lost Highway Records. The album debuted at No. 18 on the Billboard 200, selling 54,000 copies in its first week. By 2008, it had sold 415,000 copies in the U.S.

The album was a widespread critical and commercial success, and earned Williams two Grammy Award nominations in 2004: Best Contemporary Folk Album and Best Female Rock Vocal Performance for the track "Righteously".

== Critical reception ==
Professional ratings
Aggregate scores
Source	Rating
Metacritic	87/100
Review scores
Source	Rating
AllMusic	4.5/5 stars
Blender	4/5 stars
Entertainment Weekly	A
Los Angeles Times	4/4 stars
Mojo	5/5 stars
Q	4/5 stars
Rolling Stone	3/5 stars
Spin	A
Uncut	5/5 stars
The Village Voice	A−

World Without Tears was met with widespread critical acclaim. At Metacritic, which assigns a weighted average rating out of 100 to reviews from mainstream publications, the album received an average score of 87, based on 18 reviews. Spin magazine's Robert Levine believed Williams had returned to "the painful sensuality of the specific" on World Without Tears, while Will Hermes from Entertainment Weekly said the "profoundly carnal" record sounded "noisier and randier" than 2001's Essence. Robert Hilburn deemed it "a rock 'n' roll workout" in his review for the Los Angeles Times, writing that its edgiest songs sounded "close to the raw, disoriented feel" of the Rolling Stones' 1972 album Exile on Main St. entertainment.ie's review called it "dark, sleazy and impeccably rock'n'roll" while declaring Williams was "making some of the most essential roots-rock music around."

According to music essayist Kathryn Jones, World Without Tears found Williams continuing her Americana, alternative, and folk-rock sounds on songs that reflected her life since moving from Nashville to Los Angeles. In The Village Voice, Robert Christgau said while the songs were merely "pretty good" rather than "great," Williams compensated with "lowdown, dirty, smoky" music that relied on grooves and riffs. He compared it to a Sue Foley album but with better lyrics, particularly on "Those Three Days" and "Sweet Side." Rolling Stone journalist Karen Schoemer was less impressed. She praised the music's "gorgeous amalgams of country, blues and Southern rock," but was disappointed in how relentlessly bleak the lyrics were, finding them lacking her past work's "wounded innocence" and "sweetness."

== Awards ==
Award nominations for World Without Tears
Year	Award	Category	Nominated work	Result	Ref.
2004	Grammy Awards	Best Contemporary Folk Album	World Without Tears	Nominated	
2004	Grammy Awards	Best Female Rock Vocal Performance	"Righteously"	Nominated	

== Track listing ==
All tracks written by Lucinda Williams.

No.	Title	Length
1.	"Fruits of My Labor"	4:41
2.	"Righteously"	4:36
3.	"Ventura"	4:37
4.	"Real Live Bleeding Fingers and Broken Guitar Strings"	4:40
5.	"Overtime"	3:52
6.	"Those Three Days"	4:53
7.	"Atonement"	5:47
8.	"Sweet Side"	3:34
9.	"Minneapolis"	4:03
10.	"People Talkin'"	5:05
11.	"American Dream"	4:30
12.	"World Without Tears"	4:11
13.	"Words Fell"	4:11
Total length:		59:53

Vinyl release only bonus tracks
No.	Title	Writer(s)	Length
14.	"Buick Blues" (Version One)"		2:45
15.	"Hang Down Your Head"	Tom Waits; Kathleen Brennan	3:19
Total length:			65:57

== Personnel ==
- Lucinda Williams – vocals, acoustic and electric guitars
- Doug Pettibone – electric guitars, harmonies, mandolin ("People Talkin")
- Taras Prodaniuk – bass, harmonies
- Jim Christie – drums, wurlitzer ("American Dream"), vox organ ("Ventura", "Minneapolis")

== Charts ==
Chart performance for World Without Tears
Chart (2003)	Peak position
Australian Albums (ARIA)	80
Dutch Albums (Album Top 100)	81
German Albums (Offizielle Top 100)	93
Irish Albums (IRMA)	41
New Zealand Albums (RMNZ)	40
Norwegian Albums (VG-lista)	24
Swedish Albums (Sverigetopplistan)	24
UK Albums (OCC)	48
UK Country Albums (Official Charts)	3
US Billboard 200	18
