= Righteously (song) =

2003 single by Lucinda Williams

Single by Lucinda Williams

from the album World Without Tears
- Released: 2003
- Genre: Rock and roll; roots rock; Americana; alternative
- Length: 4:36
- Label: Lost Highway
- Songwriter: Lucinda Williams
- Producers: Mark Howard; Lucinda Williams

Lucinda Williams singles chronology
"Get Right With God" (2001)	"Righteously" (2003)	"Are You Alright?" (2007)

"Righteously" is a song written and performed by American singer-songwriter Lucinda Williams. It was released in 2003 as the first single from her seventh album, World Without Tears (2003).

The song earned Williams a nomination for the Grammy Award for Best Female Rock Vocal Performance in 2004.

== Content ==
A review of the song from AllMusic stated: "The muck and mire of 'Righteously', with its open six-string squall, is pure rock. It's an exhortation to a lover that he need not prove his manhood by being aloof, but to 'be the man you ought to tenderly/Stand up for me,' Doug Pettibone's overdriven, crunching guitar solo quotes both Duane Allman and Jimi Hendrix near the end of the tune." Robert Hilburn, in his review of World Without Tears for the Los Angeles Times, stated "The tempo picks up on 'Righteously', but the lyrics still speak of the search for some shelter in a stormy relationship. The fiery electric guitar underscores the desperation of the lyrics."

== Reception ==
Country music website The Boot ranked the song No. 7 on their list of the best Lucinda Williams songs, writing "In a sense, 'Righteously' is a sophisticated update of 'Passionate Kisses'. The slow-burning, searing blues riffs convey the main character's stance that she deserves desire and respect (Be the man you ought to tenderly/Stand up for me), and that her man simply needs to love her, not impress her (You don't have to prove/Your manhood to me constantly." Music website Return of Rock ranked it No. 10 on their list of Williams best songs."

== Track listing ==
CD single - US

- Radio Edit - 3:57
- Album Version - 4:36

CD single - Europe

- Radio Edit - 3:57
- Album Version - 4:36

== Awards ==
Year	Award	Category	Work	Recipient	Result	Ref.
2003	Americana Award	Song of the Year	"Righteously"	Lucinda Williams	Nominated	
2003	Grammy Award	Best Female Rock Vocal Performance	"Righteously"	Lucinda Williams	Nominated	

== Charts ==
Chart (2003)	Peak position
US Billboard Adult Top 40	36
US Billboard Adult Alternative Airplay	8
