= Are You Alright? =

2007 single by Lucinda Williams

Single by Lucinda Williams

from the album West
- Released: 2007
- Genre: Americana; folk rock
- Length: 5:18 (Album version)
- Label: Lost Highway
- Songwriter(s): Lucinda Williams
- Producer(s): Hal Willner; Lucinda Williams

Lucinda Williams singles chronology
"Righteously" (2003)	"Are You Alright?" (2007)	"Real Love" (2008)

"Are You Alright?" is a song written and performed by American singer-songwriter Lucinda Williams. It was released in 2007 as the first single from her eighth album, West (2007).

The song was featured in a season three episode of House ("Fetal Position"), which aired on April 3, 2007, and a season six episode of The Sopranos ("Kennedy and Heidi"), which aired on May 13, 2007. It also appeared in the fourth episode of the HBO series True Detective, which aired on February 9, 2014.

== Reception ==
In a four-star-out-of-five review of West for Rolling Stone, Robert Christgau called "Are You Alright?" one of Williams's "greatest songs ever", writing "Riding a deep, lazy groove and keyed to a title refrain Williams repeats twenty-two times, it employs the commonest words in the language - all on the order of 'Are you sleeping through the night?/Do you have someone to hold you tight?' - to pound home how totally (and tenderly) you can miss your ex-lover." The song later ranked No. 34 on Rolling Stone's list of the 100 Best Songs of 2007.

Country music website Holler listed "Are You Alright?" as No. 13 of the best Lucinda Williams songs; "The exploratory empathy Lucinda expresses throughout this track is a hallmark of the artist’s career spent identifying with the marginalized. Like a lullaby, this melodic sees Lucinda once again directing the lost, offering a hand to the lonely. Sincerity resounds from the repetitive chorus line as she genuinely asks 'Are you alright?'" NPR also named it one of Williams' best songs, writing "Empathy for the lost and the marginalized runs through Williams's songwriting, and this gentle secular hymn for someone who's gone missing offers it in heartbreaking measure."

== Accolades ==
Nominations for "Are You Alright?"
Year	Award	Category	Work	Recipient	Result	Ref.
2008	Americana Award	Song of the Year	"Are You Alright?"	Lucinda Williams	Nominated	

== Charts ==
Chart performance for "Are You Alright?"
Chart (2001)	Peak position
US Billboard Adult Alternative Airplay	24
