= Essence (Lucinda Williams album) =

Studio album by Lucinda Williams
- Released: June 5, 2001
- Genres: Blues rock; alternative country
- Length: 50:58
- Label: Lost Highway
- Producers: Bo Ramsey; Tom Tucker; Lucinda Williams

Lucinda Williams chronology
Car Wheels on a Gravel Road (1998)	Essence (2001)	World Without Tears (2003)

Essence is the sixth studio album by American singer-songwriter Lucinda Williams, released on June 5, 2001, by Lost Highway Records. The album debuted on the Billboard 200 at No. 28, selling approximately 44,500 copies in its first week. By 2008, it had sold 336,000 copies in the U.S.

A critical and commercial success, the album earned Williams three Grammy Award nominations in 2002: Best Contemporary Folk Album, Best Female Pop Vocal Performance for the title track, and Best Female Rock Vocal Performance for the track "Get Right With God", which she won.

== Critical reception ==
Professional ratings
Aggregate scores
Source	Rating
Metacritic	82/100
Review scores
Source	Rating
AllMusic	4/5 stars
Blender	4/5 stars
Chicago Sun-Times	3/4 stars
Christgau's Consumer Guide	A−
Entertainment Weekly	B+
Los Angeles Times	3/4 stars
Q	4/5 stars
Rolling Stone	3.5/5 stars
The Rolling Stone Album Guide	4/5 stars
Spin	8/10

Essence was met with widespread critical acclaim. At Metacritic, which assigns a normalized rating out of 100 to reviews from professional publications, the album received an average score of 82, based on 11 reviews. Reviewers observed a departure from Williams' similarly acclaimed 1998 album Car Wheels on a Gravel Road, with Rolling Stone citing the "willful intimacy" in Essence's music and Spin contrasting the "halting, spare" presentation with its predecessor's "giddy, verbose" one. AllMusic similarly stated "those hoping for another dose of the bluesy roots rock of Car Wheels on a Gravel Road may be disappointed, but if you want to take a deep and compelling look into the heart and soul of a major artist, then you owe it to yourself to hear Essence.

The Village Voice critic Robert Christgau found it "imperfect" but still praised Williams' artistry, saying "[she] is too damn good to deny." Salon regarded the album as "an emotional mess of a masterpiece". Entertainment Weekly wrote "Lucinda Williams doesn’t merely wallow in suffering. She savors it like a glass of your finest Bordeaux", and called it her "folkiest, gentlest album" and "a steamy slow-crawl — southern humidity as music — that plays into her strengths as the Joan of Dark of the alt-country set". Q listed Essence as one of the best 50 albums of 2001.

== Awards ==
Award nominations for Essence
Year	Award	Category	Nominated work	Result	Ref.
2002	Grammy Awards	Best Contemporary Folk Album	Essence	Nominated	
2002	Grammy Awards	Best Female Pop Vocal Performance	"Essence"	Nominated	
2002	Grammy Awards	Best Female Rock Vocal Performance	"Get Right With God"	Won	

== Track listing ==
All tracks written by Lucinda Williams.

No.	Title	Length
1.	"Lonely Girls"	4:01
2.	"Steal Your Love"	3:14
3.	"I Envy the Wind"	3:12
4.	"Blue"	3:52
5.	"Out of Touch"	5:25
6.	"Are You Down"	5:24
7.	"Essence"	5:50
8.	"Reason to Cry"	3:39
9.	"Get Right with God"	4:16
10.	"Bus to Baton Rouge"	5:50
11.	"Broken Butterflies"	5:41
Total length:		50:58

== Personnel ==
- Lucinda Williams – vocals, acoustic guitar
- Jim Keltner – drums
- Tony Garnier – bass, acoustic guitar
- Bo Ramsey – electric guitar
- Charlie Sexton – drums, hand drum, rhythm guitar, Hammond B3 organ, piano, background vocals, tremolo slide guitar
- Reese Wynans – Hammond B3 organ
- Jim Lauderdale – harmony vocals

Additional musicians:

- David Mansfield – viola
- Ryan Adams – tremolo guitar ("Essence")
- Gary Louris – background vocals ("Essence")
- Joy Lynn White – background vocals ("Get Right With God", "Bus to Baton Rouge", "Broken Butterflies")

== Charts ==
Chart performance for Essence
Chart (2001)	Peak position
Australian Albums (ARIA)	59
New Zealand Albums (RMNZ)	47
Norwegian Albums (VG-lista)	29
Swedish Albums (Sverigetopplistan)	47
UK Albums (OCC)	63
US Billboard 200	28
