= Buttercup (Lucinda Williams song) =

2011 single by Lucinda Williams

- promotional CD single artwork

Single by Lucinda Williams

from the album Blessed
- Released: 2011
- Genre: Americana; folk rock; alternative country; heartland rock
- Length: 3:51
- Label: Lost Highway
- Songwriter(s): Lucinda Williams
- Producer(s): Don Was; Eric Liljestrand; Tom Overby

Lucinda Williams singles chronology
"Real Love" (2008)	"Buttercup" (2011)	"Burning Bridges" (2014)

"Buttercup" is a song written and performed by American singer-songwriter Lucinda Williams. It was released in 2011 as the first single from her 10th album, Blessed (2011).

The song features Elvis Costello on guitar and Matthew Sweet on backing vocals.

== Reception ==
Country music website Holler listed "Buttercup" as No. 8 of the best Lucinda Williams songs; "Lucinda offered the much-needed reprieve of a - somewhat - playful love song. Once again, the artist has distanced herself from a deceitful lover. Her pride beams with moments of 'I told you so', but her empathic nature forces, her to consider the brokenness behind the subject's wrongdoings."

AllMusic wrote "Buttercup" is "a rollicking kiss-off to a former boyfriend in which Williams simply lays out the truth as she sees it amid a strident rock & roll cadence. The guitars swell and fade while the B-3 swirls around her voice and the low-end drums hammer her vocal accents home."

== Track listing ==
CD single

- Album version - 3:51

== Charts ==
Chart (2001)	Peak position
Australia (ARIA)	777
US Billboard Adult Alternative Airplay	26
