= You Wanted to Be the Shore But Instead You Were the Sea =

Studio album by Natalie D-Napoleon
- Released: October 1, 2020
- Recorded: 2019
- Genres: Americana, folk
- Length: 50:08
- Label: Self-released
- Producers: James Connolly, Natalie D-Napoleon

Natalie D-Napoleon chronology
Leaving Me Dry (2012)	You Wanted to Be the Shore But Instead You Were the Sea (2020)

You Wanted to Be the Shore But Instead You Were the Sea is an album by American-Australian singer-songwriter Natalie D-Napoleon, released in Australia in 2020 and North America and Europe in 2021.

== Reception ==
Professional ratings
Review scores
Source	Rating
Americana UK	8/10
PopMatters	8/10
X-Press Magazine	7.5/10

The album debuted on the Australian Independent Record Labels Association (AIR) 100% Independent Chart at number five for the week beginning October 6, reaching number one on the week beginning November 16.

Writing for XPress Magazine, music critic Conor Lochrie said about the album; "This is a raw and honest record and one that clearly values vulnerability." Reviewing the album for PopMatters, Scott M. Morrison, said the album "is audacious, assured, disarming, and even vulnerable." and said of its approach to the subject matter; "It does not idolize or embellish the women whose stories it tells. It does them a far greater service – it gives them an honest voice."

== Track listing ==
All songs by Natalie D-Napoleon, except where noted.

1. "Thunder Rumor" – 4:04
2. "How to Break a Spell" – 3:53
3. "Wildflowers" – 3:13
4. "Second Time Around" – 4:50
5. "Soft" – 5:08
6. "No Longer Mine" – 3:57
7. "You Wanted to Be the Shore But Instead You Were the Sea" – 4:40
8. "Gasoline & Liquor" (D-Napoleon, Brett Leigh Dicks) – 4:07
9. "Mother of Exiles" – 3:46
10. "Reasons" – 3:56
11. "Cut Your Hair" – 3:33
12. "Broken" – 4:57

== Personnel ==
- Natalie D-Napoleon – vocals, acoustic guitar, papoose
- Dan Phillips – piano, celesta, cajon, percussion, background vocals
- James Connolly – bass, double bass, background vocals
- Doug Pettibone – electric guitar, pedal steel, mandolin
- Angus Cooke – cello
- Laura Hemenway – accordion
- Jesse Rhodes – additional instrumentation
- Freya Phillips - background vocals
- Susan Marie Reeves - background vocals

== Production notes ==
- James Connolly – producer, engineer
- Natalie D-Napoleon - producer
- Jesse Rhodes – engineer, mixing
- Dan Phillips - mixing
- David Locke – mastering
- Brett Leigh Dicks – photography, design
