= Noah Schnacky =

American singer, social media personality, and actor

- Born: Noah James Schnacky; January 27, 1997 (age 29); Minneapolis, Minnesota, U.S.
- Occupations: Actor; singer

Noah James Schnacky (born January 27, 1997) is an American singer, social media personality, and actor.

== Early life ==
Schnacky was born on January 27, 1997, in Minneapolis. He was raised in Orlando, Florida, and Los Angeles with his three younger sisters Allison, Ella, and Noelle.

== Career ==
In 2011, Schnacky appeared in the "Symphony of Illumination" episode of How I Met Your Mother. He was a cast member in the ShowMobile series HitStreak in 2013.

Schnacky released the single, "Miami to LA," in 2014. In 2018, Schnacky independently released his debut single, "Hello Beautiful" and "Maybe We Will." These first two singles garnered 51 million streams on Spotify. In 2019, Schnacky performed at C2C: Country to Country, marking his debut live performance in the United Kingdom. In 2019, Schnacky released his Big Machine Records debut single, "I'll Be the One," garnering over 15 million streams as of July 3, 2021. The song was co-written by Schnacky, Jordan Schmidt, and Seth Ennis. In 2020, Schnacky toured with Canaan Smith. In June 2020, Schnacky released country pop single, "Feels Like Love," which was co-written by Schnacky, Ross Copperman, and Matt Rogers. On July 5, 2020, Schnacky performed "The Star-Spangled Banner" at the Indianapolis Motor Speedway. On July 24, 2020, Schnacky released his eponymous debut EP featuring seven tracks. He had 6.9 million followers on TikTok as of June 2021.

Schnacky's debut album, Thoughtfully Reckless, was released on February 11, 2022, via Big Machine Records.

== Awards and honors ==
Year	Award	Category	Result	Ref(s)
2016	Young Artist Award	Best Web Performance – Young Actor	Nominated	
2018	Teen Choice Awards	Music Web Star	Nominated	
2025	Grammy Awards	Best Contemporary Christian Music Performance/Song	Nominated	

== Discography ==
=== Albums ===
- Thoughtfully Reckless (2022)

=== EP ===
- Noah Schnacky (2020)

=== Singles ===
- "Miami to LA" (2014)
- "Hello Beautiful" (2018)
- "Maybe We Will" (2018)
- "I'll Be the One" (2019)
- "Comeback" (2020)
- "Feels Like Love" (2020)
- "Where'd You Go" (2020)
- "Every Girl I Ever Loved" (2020)
- "She Broke My Heart" (2021)
- "Don't You Wanna Know" (2021) (with Jimmie Allen)
