= Brooke Annibale =

American singer-songwriter and musician (born 1987)

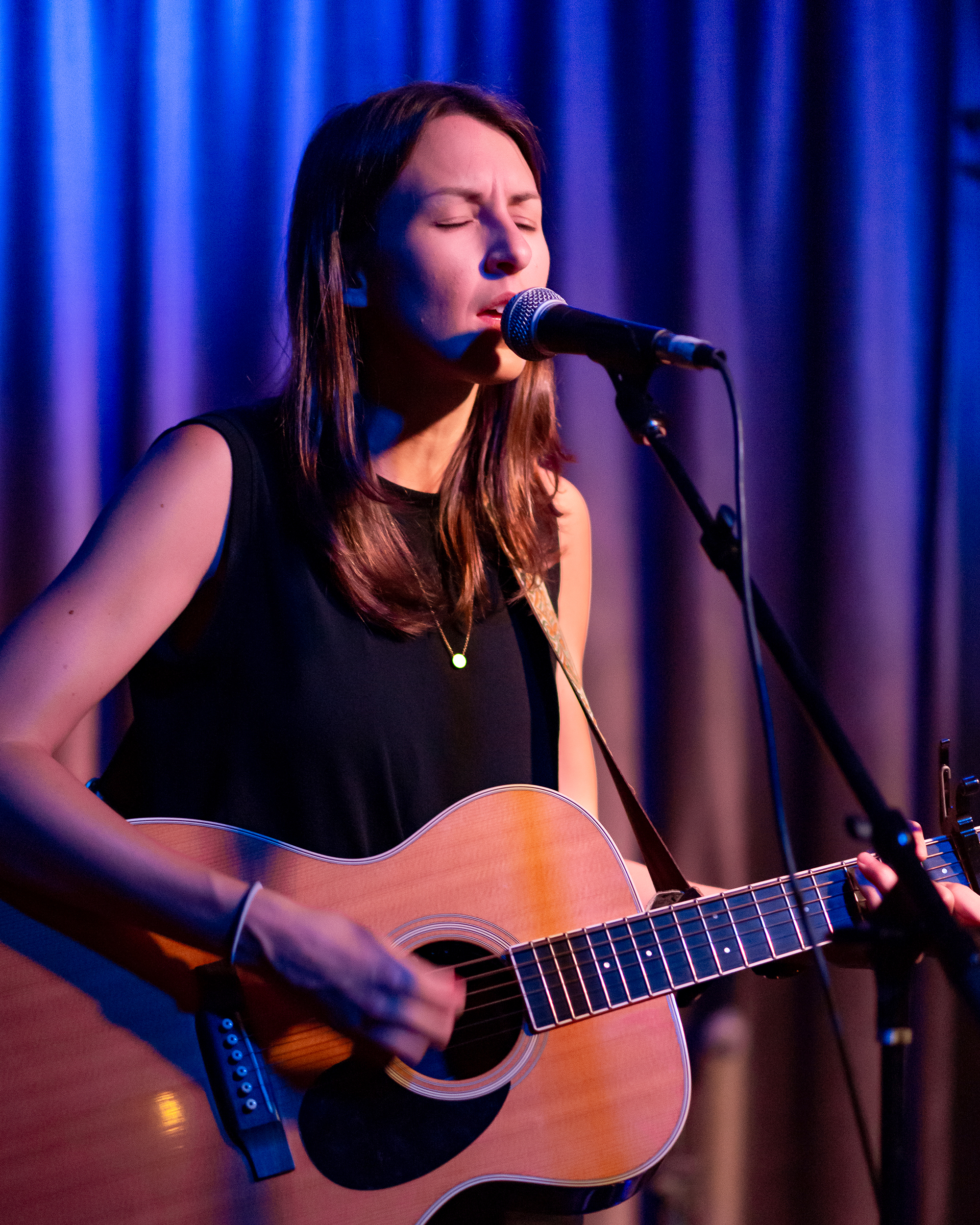
- Annibale in 2018

Background information
- Born: July 1987 (age 38–39)
- Origin: Pittsburgh, Pennsylvania, U.S.
- Genres: Contemporary folk
- Occupation: Singer-songwriter
- Instruments: Vocals, guitar, ukulele
- Years active: 2005–present
- Website: brookeannibale.com

Brooke Annibale (born July 1987) is an American singer-songwriter and musician from Pittsburgh, Pennsylvania.

== Music career ==
Brooke Annibale started to write songs at age 15 and soon began performing in the Pittsburgh vicinity. At 17, she released her first full-length album, Memories in Melody as her senior project at Moon Area High School. After graduating in 2005 she went to Belmont University receiving a degree in music business in 2009.

In 2010, Annibale raised crowd funds with a Kickstarter campaign funding recordings with producer Paul Moak at The Smoakstack in Nashville. The sessions became the album, Silence Worth Breaking, which was self-published and released by Annibale on March 15, 2011. The album garnered positive reviews from writers in Pittsburgh and Brian Palmer of Glide Magazine called it "phenomenal" writing, "Filled with gravitas, passion, joy, sorrow, humility and boldness, the ten tracks that make up Silence Worth Breaking are done in a stunning, hypnotic fashion, encompassing the genres of folk, rock, Americana and pop in masterful ways."

Words in Your Eyes, was released February 5, 2013 and featured at an official launch performance at Club Cafe in Pittsburgh, on March 9, 2013.

Annibale's critically acclaimed fourth album The Simple Fear released on October 2, 2015. Produced by Justin March at Paul Moak's Smoakstack studio in Nashville, the album release was followed by a breakout year for Annibale and then continuous touring with artists including Iron & Wine, Josh Ritter, Margaret Glaspy, Great Lake Swimmers, Jesca Hoop, Rufus Wainwright, The Handsome Family, Chadwick Stokes, and Aoife O'Donovan. Annibale won an Independent Music Award for Best Folk/Singer-Songwriter Album and appeared at the Philadelphia Folk Festival, Folk Alliance International, and SXSW.

In March 2018, Annibale announced her latest full-length studio album Hold to the Light which was released on June 8, 2018. Produced by Sam Kassirer (Ritter, Lake Street Dive, Craig Finn) at his Great North Sound Society studio in Maine, the album features contributions from Zachariah Hickman (Ray LaMontagne, Ritter) on bass; Josh Kaufman (The National, Ritter) on accompanying guitars; Sean Trischka on drums; and Matt Douglas (Sylvan Esso, The Mountain Goats) on woodwinds.

== Discography ==
=== Albums ===
- Memories in Melody, self-released, March 15, 2005
- Silence Worth Breaking, self-released, March 15, 2011
- The Simple Fear, Brooke Annibale Music, October 2, 2015
- Hold to the Light, Brooke Annibale Music, June 8, 2018
- Better by Now, September 30, 2022

=== EPs ===
- Words in Your Eyes EP, Brooke Annibale Music, February 5, 2013
- Silence Worth Breaking (Redux), Brooke Annibale Music, May 7, 2021

=== Singles ===
- "This Holiday", November 15, 2011
- "Home Again", June 26, 2020
- "What If You", May 9, 2022

== Television ==
Several of Annibale's songs have been licensed for use in television:

Year	Song title	TV Network	Show or Series	Season	Episode	Episode Title	Original Airdate
2011	Under Streetlights	The CW Television Network	Hart of Dixie	1	6	The Undead and the Unsaid	November 7, 2011
2011	Under Streetlights	MTV	Teen Mom 2	2	4	No Looking Back	December 27, 2011
2012	Yours and Mine	The CW Television Network	One Tree Hill	9	3	Love the Way You Lie	January 25, 2012
2012	Fright	MTV	Teen Mom 2	2	12	Love Will Tear Us Apart	February 14, 2012
2012	Under Streetlights	The CW Television Network	One Tree Hill	9	7	Last Known Surroundings	February 22, 2012
2012	I Believe	The CW Television Network	One Tree Hill	9	11	Danny Boy	March 21, 2012
2012	Tryin'	CMT	Melissa & Tye	1	2	After the Dust Settles	April 27, 2012
2012	Empathy	VH1	Tough Love New Orleans	4	8	Exes	June 10, 2012
2012	Yours and Mine	ABC Family	Jane by Design	1	14	The Second Chance	June 26, 2012
2012	Don't Let Them Tell You	MTV	Teen Mom 2	3	3	Things Come to an End	November 26, 2012
2013	By Your Side	Lifetime Television	The Client List	2	11	I Miss Back When	May 19, 2013
2013	You Don't Know	The CW Television Network	The Vampire Diaries	5	5	Monster's Ball	October 31, 2013
2014	Silence Worth Breaking	ABC Family	Pretty Little Liars	5	11	No One Here Can Love or Understand Me	August 19, 2014
2017	Silence Worth Breaking	ABC Family	Pretty Little Liars	7	17	Driving Miss Crazy	June 6, 2017
2018	By Your Side	ABC	Grey's Anatomy	14	23	Cold As Ice	May 10, 2018
2021	Either I	The CW Television Network	Batwoman	2	9	Rule #1	March 28, 2021

== Awards and nominations ==
Year	Nominated work	Organization	Award	Result
2012	Silence Worth Breaking	11th Annual Independent Music Awards	Best Adult Contemporary Album	Nominated
2012	Silence Worth Breaking	11th Annual IMA VOX Populi Poll	Best Adult Contemporary Album	Won
2016	The Simple Fear	15th Annual Independent Music Awards	Best Folk/Singer-Songwriter Album	Won
