= Essence (Lucinda Williams song) =

2001 single by Lucinda Williams

Single by Lucinda Williams

from the album Essence
- Released: 2001
- Genre: Blues rock; alternative country
- Length: 5:51
- Label: Lost Highway
- Songwriter: Lucinda Williams
- Producers: Bo Ramsey; Tom Tucker; Lucinda Williams

Lucinda Williams singles chronology
"Can't Let Go" (1998)	"Essence" (2001)	"Get Right With God" (2001)

"Essence" is a song written and performed by American singer-songwriter Lucinda Williams. It was released in 2001 as the first single from her sixth album, Essence (2001).

The song earned Williams a nomination for the Grammy Award for Best Female Pop Vocal Performance in 2002.

== Content ==
A review of the song from AllMusic stated: "Williams kicks up a little mud here with a chunky guitar riff tempered by a dash of dark menace, especially when paired with the opening attention grabber, 'Baby, sweet baby/You're my drug/Come on and let me taste your stuff.' A nasty sexual air permeates the track, enhanced by Williams' breathy vocal, imbued with a sinister swagger as the band obliges with a steadily pulsing low-down groove. The mood lightens considerably in the chorus as Williams' voice, bolstered by high harmony backing vocals from Gary Louris, rises up with the determination of a stalker, digging in her heels, resolved to wait her lover out."

== Reception ==
Spin called the song a "midtempo rocker that harks back to the stuff by the Divinyls or Concrete Blonde." Salon called it "the boldest anthem she's ever recorded, not merely because of lyrical explicitness such as 'You're my drug, come on and let me taste your stuff', and 'Please come find me and help me get fucked up', 'Essence' is less a song about seducing an object of desire than a song about lust's voracious hunger, an arousal so strong it all but obliterates that object. It's a song that strips away every last layer of protective bark from an impulse that will not be denied."

NPR described the song as a "pheromone daydream, the epitome of Williams's erotic expressionism." Country music website Holler listed "Essence" as No. 11 of the best Lucinda Williams songs, writing "The toxic elixir of a no-good partner seeps through this dark and delirious grunge tune. Completely overtaken by this person, Lucinda ideates their presence with palpable yearning; their absence seems to result in a potentially lethal chemical imbalance. She likens the wanting to an overdue drug dosage from an addict: 'Whisper my name/Shoot your love into my vein'." The song peaked at No. 9 on Billboard's Adult Alternative Airplay chart.

== Track listing ==
CD single - US

- Album Version - 5:51
- Clean Edit - 5:51

CD single - Europe

- Radio Edit - 4:36
- Album Version - 5:51

== Awards ==
Year	Award	Category	Work	Recipient	Result	Ref.
2002	Grammy Award	Best Female Pop Vocal Performance	"Essence"	Lucinda Williams	Nominated	

== Charts ==
Chart (2001)	Peak position
US Billboard Adult Alternative Airplay	9
