= Doug Pettibone =

American singer-songwriter

- Born: Los Angeles, United States
- Genres: rock, pop, jazz, R&B, country, streets—Blues, roots
- Occupations: Musician, singer, songwriter
- Instruments: guitar, electric guitar, steel guitar, slide guitar, hi string guitar

Doug Pettibone (born in Los Angeles, California) is an American guitarist, singer, songwriter and studio musician.

== Career ==
Doug Pettibone started to play the guitar at the age of eight. His first teacher was Andy Summers, formerly of The Police. With nine years, Doug studied with Eddie Lafreniere, guitarist for big band leader Jimmy Dorsey, with whom he spent the next five years studying the music of Dave Brubeck and Duke Ellington. Later he received a scholarship to Pepperdine University-Malibu for Jazz Guitar, Classical Guitar and Voice, graduating with a triple major in 1984. In the following years he played with many different artists of various genres.

In 1999, Doug started a world tour with Jewel that lasted for a year and a half. In 2001, he played pedal steel, mandolin and background vocals for Tracy Chapman's North American tour. Shortly after that, Lucinda Williams hired Pettibone as her multi-instrumentalist, singer and music director to tour, record, and co-produce. Doug´s intensive collaboration with Lucinda lasted for eight years, and continued at a later stage again. In the following years, Pettibone realized several projects with other artists. In 2004 Doug participated in the Legends Rock TV show produced in the South of France, featuring guest artists such as Sam Moore, Billy Preston and Tony Joe White. Ray LaMontagne is amongst the artist Doug went on tour with, in 2009 it was Marianne Faithfull who called him up to go on tour. After that Marianne Faithfull and Doug Pettibone started to write together new songs for a new album.

In the last few years, Pettibone has played live and/or recorded with many well-known artists, including Keith Richards, Norah Jones, Steve Earle, Elvis Costello, Joan Baez, Mark Knopfler, Draco Rosa, Sting, Michelle Shocked, Vic Chesnutt, and Kevin Montgomery, amongst others. In 2012, he went on tour with Lisa Marie Presley, daughter of Elvis Presley. In 2013 Pettibone toured with Lucinda Williams.

He joined John Mayer's touring band as lap steel and guitar player for the Born and Raised 2013 World Tour.

In 2016, Pettibone took part in the world tour with Zucchero; accompanied by Brian Auger on Hammond Organ.

== Solo career ==
In October 2004, Pettibone released his first solo record The West Gate. Pettibone's second solo CD, Gone, was released in 2014.

== Discography ==
=== Solo albums ===
- 2004: The West Gate (self-released)
- 2014: Gone (self-released)

=== Appears on ===
- 1996: Disappear Fear - Seed in the Sahara (Rounder / Philo) - guitar
- 1997: Catie Curtis - Catie Curtis (Capitol) - guitar (electric, nylon-string, gut-string)
- 1997: Dave Koz - December Makes Me Feel This Way (Capitol) - guitar (electric, acoustic, bass)
- 1997 Joy Lynn White - Lucky Few (Little Dog / Mercury) - guitar (acoustic, electric)
- 1999: Jewel - Spirit (Atlantic) - electric guitar
- 2001: Dick Sims - Within Arm's Reach (Explosive) - guitar
- 2002: Alejandro Escovedo - By the Hand of the Father (Texas Music Group) - electric guitar, steel guitar, hi string guitar, slide guitar
- 2002: Tim Flannery - Highway Song (PSB) - lap steel, pedal steel
- 2002: Rian Greene - See Things Like You (TSR) - guitar (12 string, acoustic, electric, baritone)
- 2003: Joan Baez - Dark Chords on a Big Guitar (Koch / Sanctuary) - acoustic guitar
- 2003: Cindy Alexander - Smash (JamCat) - guitar, pedal steel
- 2003: Vic Chesnutt - Silver Lake (New West) - arranger, guitar (12 string, acoustic, electric, tremolo), mandolin, pedal steel, vocals
- 2003: Kevin Montgomery - Another Long Story (Syren) - guitar (acoustic, electric, baritone, steel), vocals
- 2003: Lucinda Williams - World Without Tears (Lost Highway) - arranger, electric guitar, mandolin, vocals
- 2004: Tony Furtado - These Chains (Funzal) - guitar (acoustic, electric), pedal steel
- 2004: Berkley Hart - Twelve (PAN via CD Baby) - pedal steel
- 2004: Jesse Malin - The Heat (Artemis) - electric guitar, pedal steel
- 2004: Kevin Montgomery - 2:30am (Syren) - audio production, electric guitar, gut string guitar, producer
- 2004: Waylon Payne - The Drifter (Universal) - guitar
- 2004: Phil Parlapiano - Pianoforte (PBR) - vocals
- 2004: Tim Flannery - Kentucky Towns (PSB) - electric guitar, pedal steel
- 2005: Faby - Finally (Megabien Music) - guitar (acoustic, electric), vocals
- 2005: Shurman - Jubilee (Vanguard) - pedal steel
- 2005: Sara Evans - Feels Like Home (RCA Nashville) - electric guitar
- 2005: Keith Gattis - Big City Blues (Smith Music) - pedal steel
- 2005: Matthew Grimm - Dawn's Early Apocalypse (Grimm Reality Music) - vocals
- 2005: Mark Knopfler - The Trawlerman's Song EP (Mercury) - electric guitar
- 2005: Mark Knopfler - One Take Radio Sessions (Warner Bros.) - electric guitar, mandolin
- 2005: Madrugada - The Deep End (EMI / Virgin) - pedal steel
- 2005: Tom McRae - All Maps Welcome (Sony / BMG) - pedal steel
- 2005: Michelle Shocked - Don't Ask, Don't Tell (Mighty Sound) - guitar, harmonica, vocals
- 2005: Michelle Shocked - Mexican Standoff (Mighty Sound) - guitar, vocals
- 2005: Michelle Shocked - Threesome (Mighty Sound) - guitar, vocals, harmonica
- 2005: Lucinda Williams - Live at the Fillmore (Lucinda Williams album) (Lost Highway) - guitar, harmonica, lap steel, mandolin, pedal steel, vocals
- 2006: Debi Derryberry - What a Way to Play (4River / Very Derryberry) - electric guitar
- 2006: Tim Easton - Ammunition (New West) - electric guitar, mando-guitar
- 2006: Anne McCue - Koala Motel (Messenger) - pedal steel
- 2006: Molly Howson - Bar Napkin Songs (CD Baby) - guitar (acoustic, electric), lap steel, producer
- 2006: Nathaniel Street-West - Witness (Puffin) - pedal steel
- 2006: various artists - Rogue's Gallery: Pirate Ballads, Sea Songs, and Chanteys (Anti-) - guitar, background vocals
- 2007: Debi Derryberry - Very Derryberry (4River / Very Derryberry) - guitar
- 2007: Herman Mathews - Home At Last (Lil Herman) - dobro, guitar
- 2007: Dave Koz - Memories of a Winter's Night (Capitol) - guitar (acoustic, electric)
- 2007: Gia Ciambotti - Right as Rain (New Light) - dobro, guitar (acoustic, electric), lap steel, mandolin, pedal steel
- 2007: Olivea Watson - Way Down Deep (Ramblin' Rose) - guitar (acoustic, electric, tremolo, slide), mandolin, pedal steel, vocals
- 2007: The Honey Togue Devils - All Tall & The Melting Moon (CD Baby) - guitar
- 2007: Lucinda Williams - West (Lost Highway) - guitar (acoustic, baritone, electric)
- 2008: Austin Hartley-Leonard - Franklin Ave. (Mother West) - guitar, pedal steel
- 2008: Tift Merritt - Another Country (Fantasy) - guitar, pedal steel
- 2008: Gregory Page - All Make Believe (Sounden) - electric guitar, pedal steel
- 2008: Lucinda Williams - Little Honey (Lost Highway) - dobro, guitar (acoustic, electric, slide, 12-string electric & acoustic) pedal steel, vocals
- 2008: honeyhoney - First Rodeo (Ironworks Music / Universal Republic) - guitar
- 2009: Wink Keziah - Hard Times (Great South) - electric guitar
- 2009: Debi Derryberry - Debi Derryberry's Baby Banana (4River / Very Derryberry) - electric guitar, vocals
- 2010: Shy Blakeman - Long Distance Man (Winding Road) - dobro, guitar (12 string, acoustic, electric)
- 2010: Matt Blais - Let It Out (self-released) - guitar, lap steel, pedal steel, vocals
- 2010: Chocolate Genius, Inc. - Swansongs (One Little Indian) - guitar
- 2010: Mark Sholtez - The Distance Between Two Truths (Warner Music Australasia) - electric guitar, baritone guitar, mandolin, pedal steel, lap steel
- 2010: Mojo Monkeys - Blessings & Curses (Medikull) - pedal steel
- 2011: John Doe - Keeper (Yep Roc) - pedal steel
- 2011: David Nail - The Sound of a Million Dreams (MCA Nashville) - electric guitar
- 2011: Jill Sobule and John Doe - A Day at the Pass (Pinko) - banjo, guitar, pedal steel
- 2011: Marianne Faithfull - Horses and High Heels (Dramatico) - banjo, composer, guitar (acoustic, electric), pedal steel, vocals (lead, background)
- 2012: Ted Wulfers - Lucky No. 7 (Patchdog) - electric guitar on "More Than A Mystery" and "Me & Miss 4th of July."
- 2012: Anna Bergendahl - Something To Believe In (Lionheart) - guitar
- 2012: G. DaPonte - Lucky Days and Lucky Numbers (Three Moves Equals A Fire) - electric guitar
- 2013: various artists - Son of Rogues Gallery: Pirate Ballads, Sea Songs & Chanteys (Anti- / Epitaph) - guitar
- 2014: Lucinda Williams - Down Where the Spirit Meets the Bone (Highway 20) - electric guitar, vocals
- 2014: various artists - Looking Into You: A Tribute to Jackson Browne (Music Road) - electric guitar on track 2-2 "The Pretender"
- 2015: The White Buffalo - Love And The Death Of Damnation (Unison) - pedal steel, lap steel
- 2015: Todd Griffin - Mountain Man (Bad Reputation) - guitar
- 2015: various artists - Remembering Mountains: Unheard Songs by Karen Dalton (Tompkins Square) - guitar on track 5, "Met An Old Friend"
- 2016: various artists - God Don't Never Change: The Songs of Blind Willie Johnson (Alligator) - guitar
- 2017: Shelby Lynne & Allison Moorer - Not Dark Yet (album)
- 2020: Natalie D-Napoleon - You Wanted To Be The Shore But Instead You Were The Sea - guitar (electric), pedal steel, mandolin
- 2013 The Music Is You: A Tribute to John Denver - Guitar (Electric)
- 2012 Walter Rose: Cast Your Stone - Guitar, Weissenborn, 12 string octave guitar
- 2012 Occupy This Album - Guitar, Mandolin
- 2012 Quiet About It: A Tribute To Jesse Winchester - Guitar (Electric)
- 2009 Porcupine - Tim Easton - Guitar
- 2009 The Great Lakes - Ross McIntosh - Banjo, Dobro, Guitar (Acoustic), Guitar (Electric), Mando-Guitar, Vocals
- 2008 Kid Dynamite and the Common Man - Eric Corne - Dobro, Guitar (Electric), Main Personnel, Ukulele
- 2008 Let It All Come Down - G. DaPonte - Guitar, Guitar (Electric), Soloist
- 2008 The Imus Ranch Record - Guitar
- 2007 Boots Too Big to Fill: Tribute to Gene Autry - Harmony
- 2007 Goin' Home: A Tribute to Fats Domino - Guitar (Electric)
- 2007 Outta Nowhere - Tim Myers - Banjo, Guitar (Acoustic), Guitar (Electric), Mandolin
- 2007 Rio Rocko - Rio Rocko - Guitar (12 String Electric), Guitar (Electric)
- 2005 Return to Sin City: A Tribute to Gram Parsons - Guitar, Vocals
- 2005 This Is Americana, Vol. 2 - Guitar, Harmonica, Vocals
- 2004 Por Vida: A Tribute to the Songs of Alejandro Escovedo - Guitar, Producer
- 2004 This Is Americana - Guitar (Electric), Harmony, Mandolin
- 2003 Crossing Jordan - Guitar (Electric)
- 2003 Martin Scorsese Presents the Blues: The Soul of a Man - Bass, Vocals
- 2003 Sounds of Wood and Steel, Vol. 3 - Guitar, Primary Artist
- Artist's Choice: Norah Jones - Norah Jones - Group Member

== Filmography ==
- Made in America (TV series documentary) (2003)
- Legends Rock (music TV series) (2004)
- Jefferson Davis: An American President (TV documentary) (musician: guitar) (2008)
