= Grammy Award for Best Contemporary Folk Album =

Grammy Award category

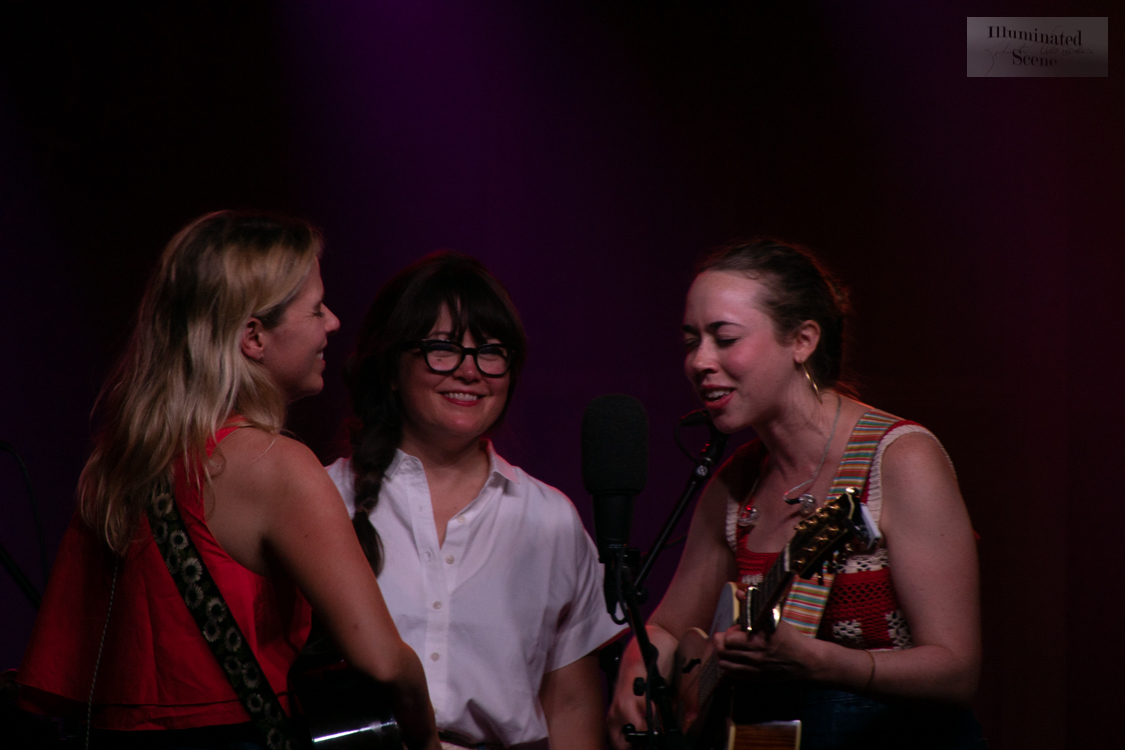
- Wild and Clear and Blue by I'm with Her is the most recent recipient
- Awarded for: quality contemporary folk music albums
- Country: United States
- Presented by: National Academy of Recording Arts and Sciences
- First award: 1987
- Currently held by: I'm with Her – Wild and Clear and Blue (2026)

Highlights
- Most wins: Bob Dylan, Steve Earle (3)
- Most nominations: Steve Earle (8)
- Website: grammy.com

The Grammy Award for Best Contemporary Folk Album is an award presented by the Recording Academy to honor quality folk music albums in any given year. The award was originally presented from 1987 to 2011, before being merged with Best Traditional Folk Album to form the Grammy Award for Best Folk Album. The category was revived in 2026 and was re-presented at the 69th Annual Grammy Awards in 2027, with the Academy stating that the award honors “excellence in albums of contemporary folk recordings.” The category sits in the Country & American Roots field.

The inaugural recipient of the award was a tribute album to Steve Goodman, which was awarded to its producers Al Bunetta, Dan Einstein, Hank Neuberger and was presented at the 29th Annual Grammy Awards. Goodman himself won the following year with Unfinished Business. Tracy Chapman was the first female winner of the category with her self-titled debut album in 1989. The most recent recipient is I'm with Her, whose album Wild and Clear and Blue won at the 68th Annual Grammy Awards in 2026. Bob Dylan and Steve Earle have the most wins in the category, with three each, with Earle also having the most nominations, with eight.

== History ==
Prior to 1987, contemporary and traditional folk albums were combined as the Best Ethnic or Traditional Folk Recording. From 1987 to 1991, the category was presented as Best Contemporary Folk Recording. In 2007, the category was renamed Best Contemporary Folk/Americana Album. As of 2010 the category was split into two categories; Best Contemporary Folk Album and Best Americana Album.

Following the 2011 Grammy Award ceremony, the award was discontinued due to a major overhaul of Grammy categories. Beginning in 2012, this category merged with the Best Traditional Folk Album category to form the new Best Folk Album category. The Recording Academy decided to create this new category for 2012 upon stating there were "challenges in distinguishing between... Contemporary and Traditional Folk". The inaugural recipients of the award were The Civil Wars, who won in 2012 for their album Barton Hollow, and the final recipients were I'm with Her, who won in 2026 for their album Wild and Clear and Blue.

On June 16, 2026, it was announced that the Best Traditional Folk Album category would be returning, and that the Best Folk Album category would be renamed Best Contemporary Folk Album. Of the announcement, Recording Academy CEO Harvey Mason Jr. stated, "2027 is going to be an amazing year for the Grammy Awards, and one that reflects the extraordinary growth we're seeing across music. The changes advanced by our Recording Academy members speak to the breadth of today's music industry and the many genres, crafts and creators shaping it. We're excited to see these updates come to life in the year ahead as we celebrate the music people who are driving music forward". It was stated that the re-separation of the Best Folk Album category "provides more precise recognition across different forms of folk music and better reflects the breadth of that musical landscape". The Folk Alliance International, a non-profit organization centred around the folk genre, petitioned the Recording Academy for the return of the Traditional and Contemporary Folk Album categories, and celebrated the announcement, stating that it was something their membership had "long called for" and which "addresses a significant representation and credibility gap in the genre" and challenges a "long-held stereotype that folk music is exclusively Eurocentric", as well as their hope that this would allow for more culturally diverse folk and traditional music to be honored moving forwards.

== Eligibility ==
According to the Recording Academy's rulebook for the 2027 ceremony, eligible albums for this category include recordings "that vary from traditional folk song and harmonic structures and may employ non-traditional folk song structures including composition and narrative expressions" and includes subgenres such as indie folk, ethnofolk, protest music, folk rock, and any others that differ from the folk-pop approach. Eligible albums can include both traditional and non-traditional folk instrumentation and incorporates contemporary production techniques.

== Winners and nominees ==
=== 1987-2011 ===
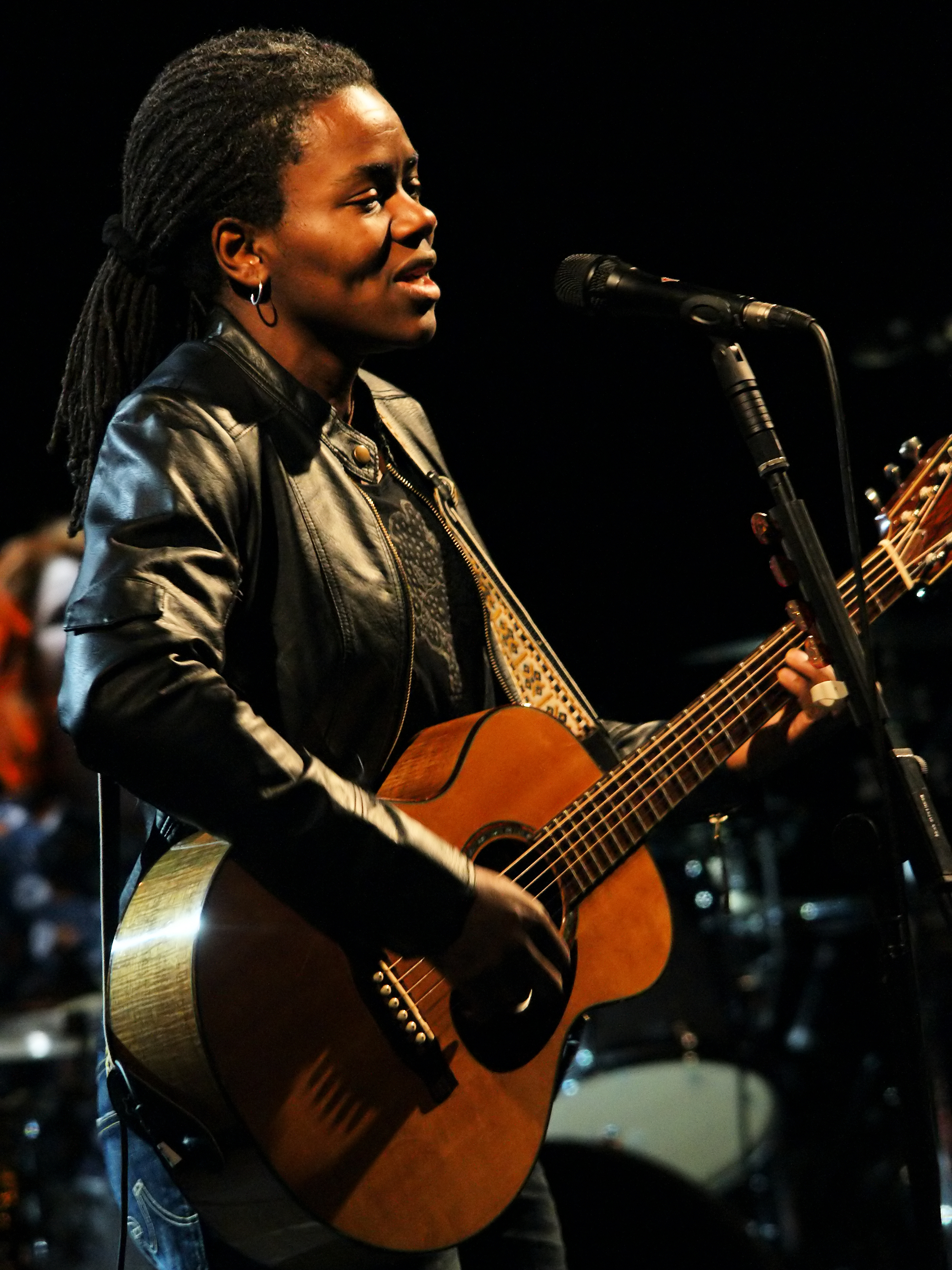
Tracy Chapman won in 1989 for her debut album.

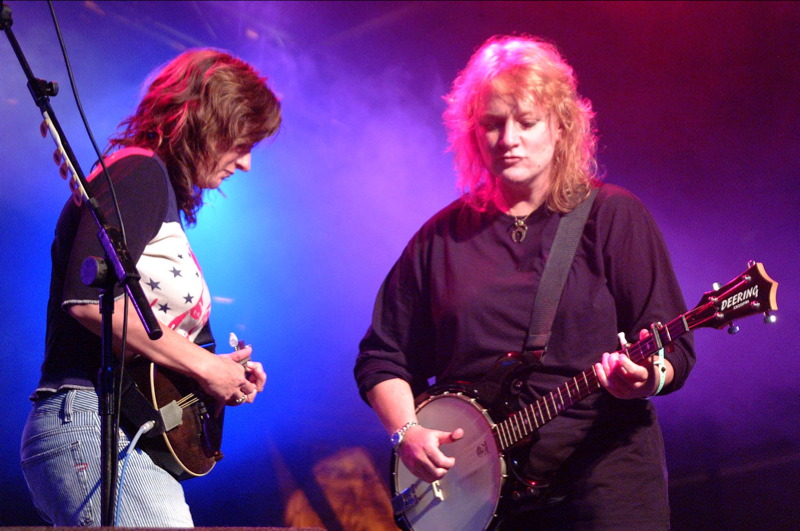
1990 winners and six-time nominees Indigo Girls.

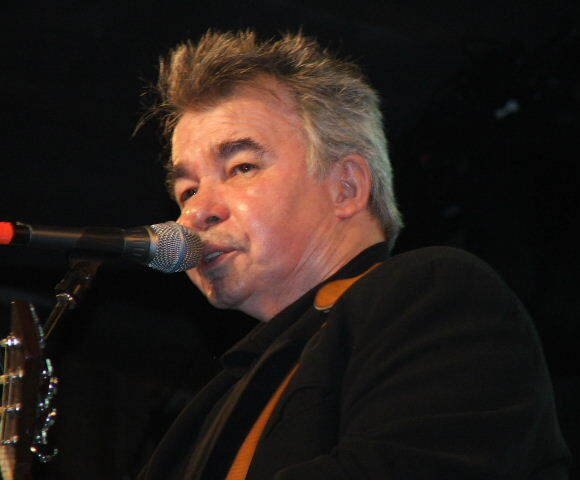
Two-time recipient John Prine.

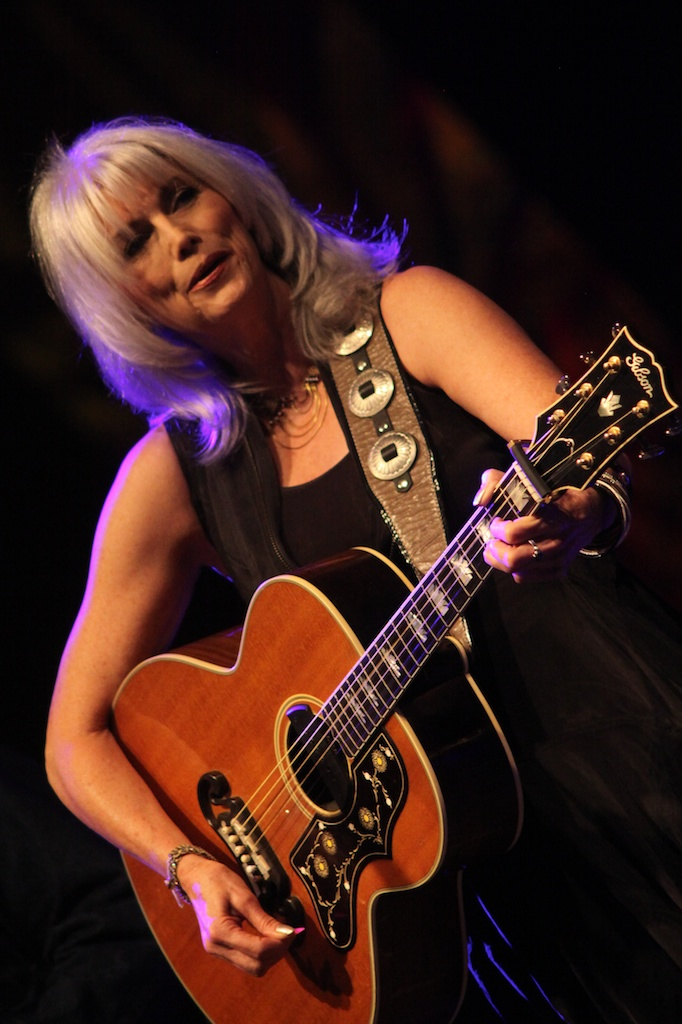
Two-time winner and seven-time nominee Emmylou Harris.

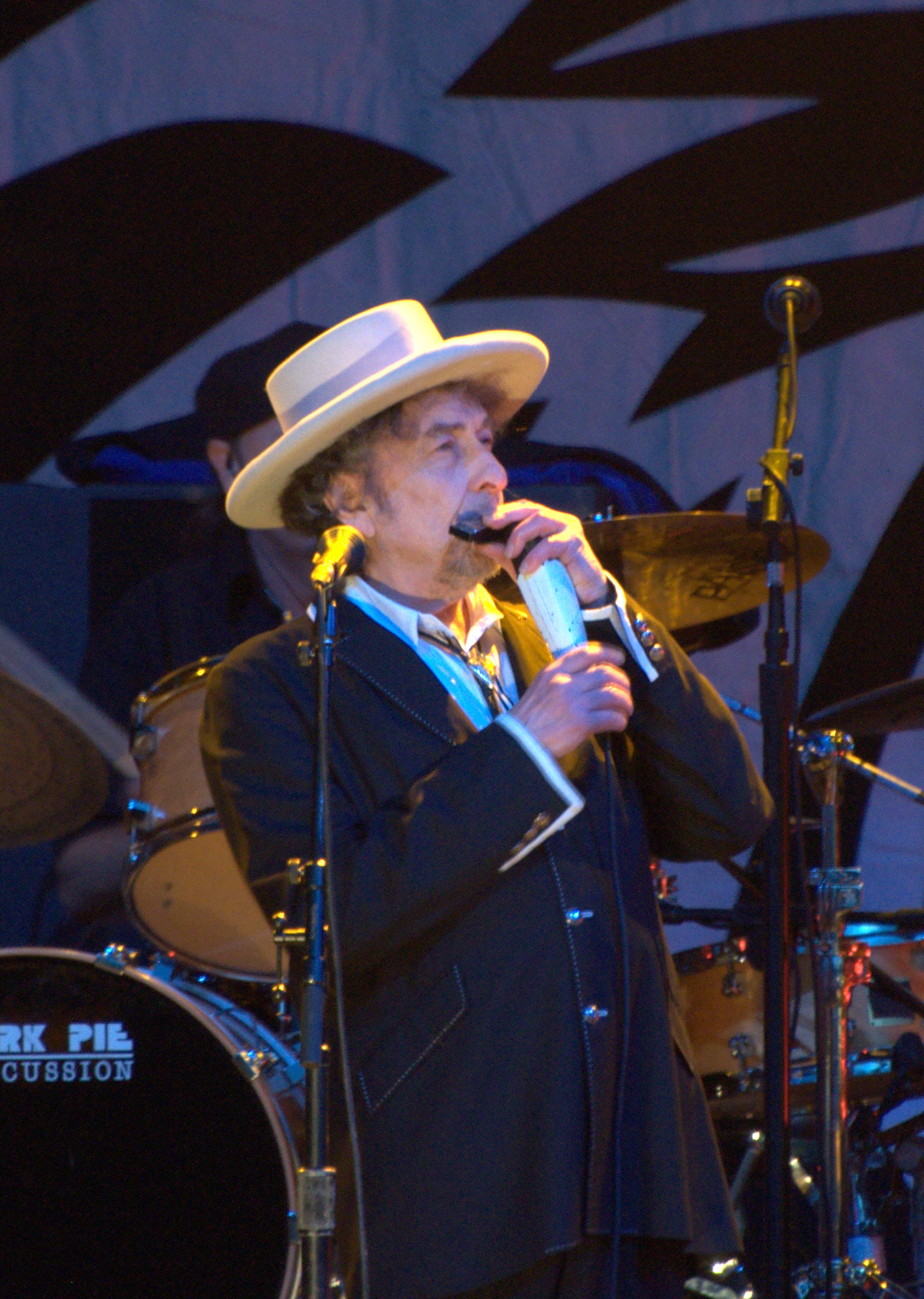
Bob Dylan won the award three times.

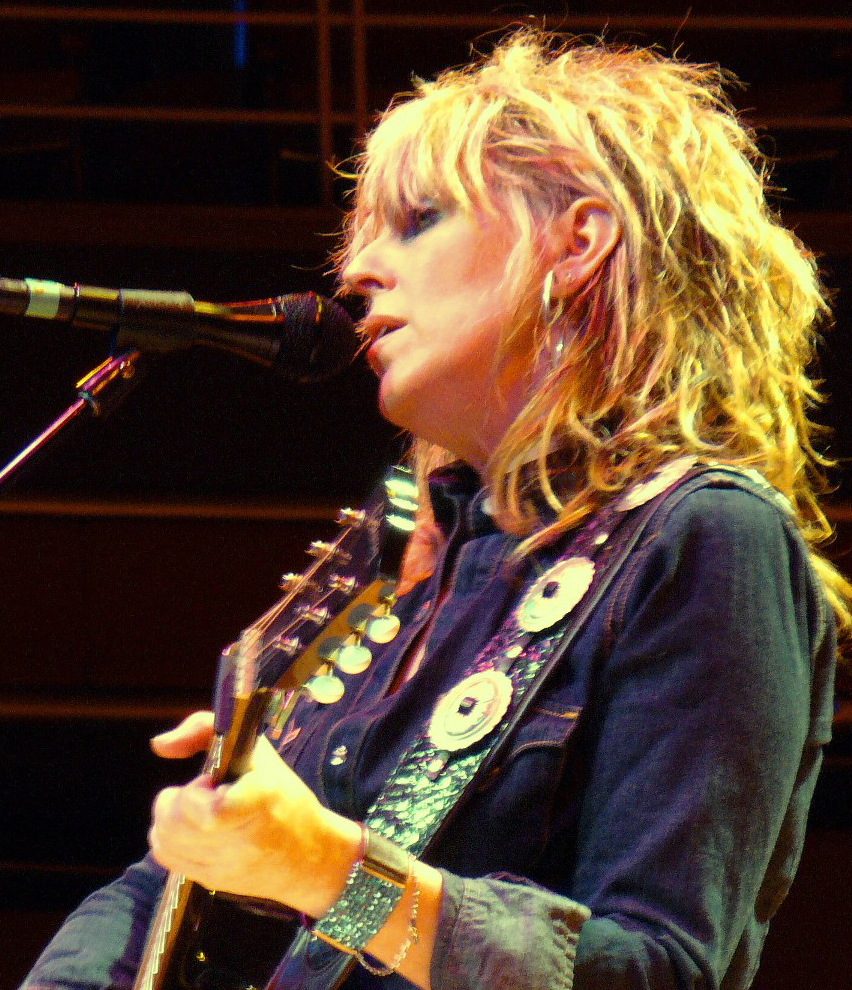
Lucinda Williams received the award in 1999 for Car Wheels on a Gravel Road.

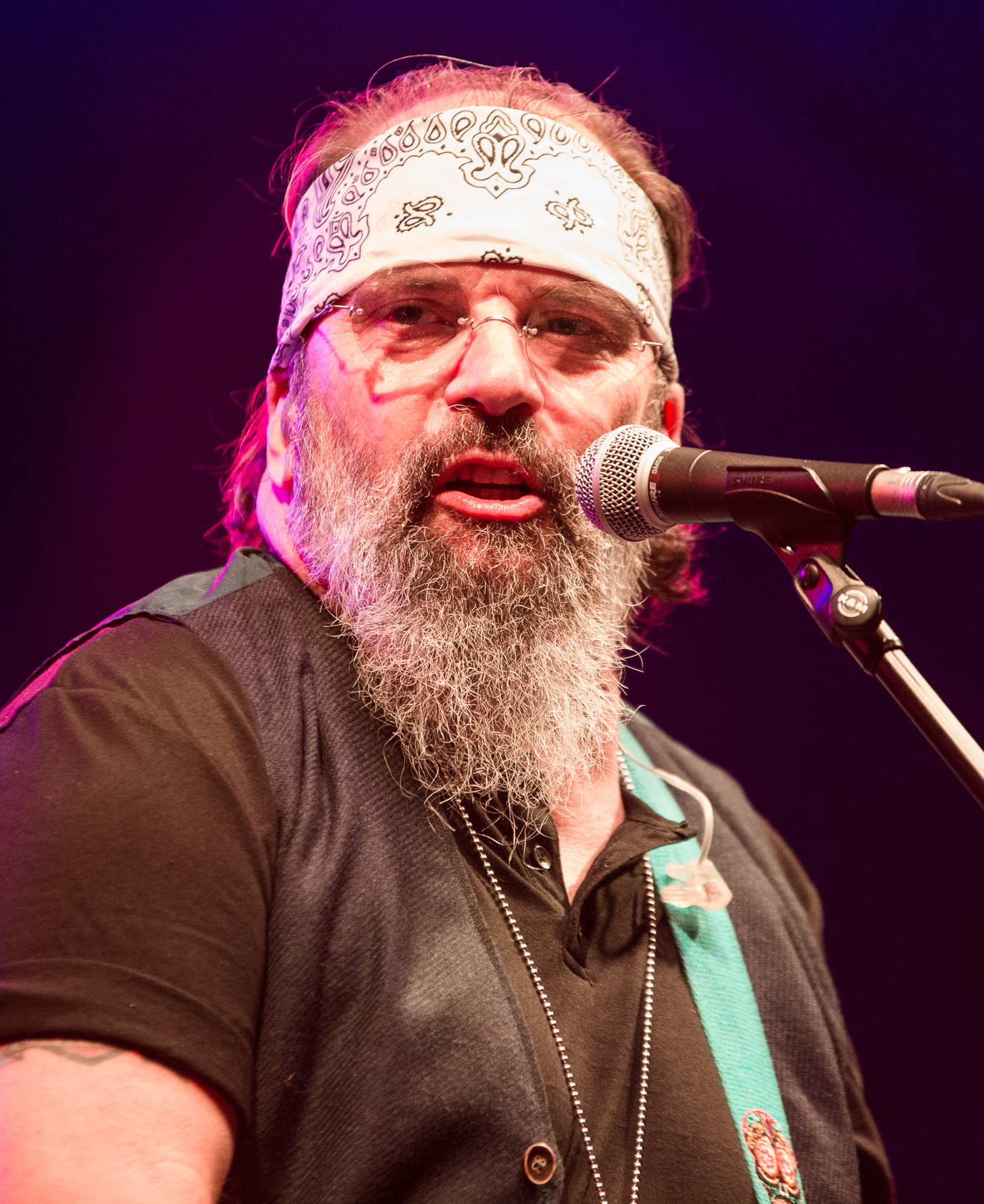
Three-time winner Steve Earle.

Year	Work	Artist
1987
1987	Tribute to Steve Goodman	Al Bunetta, Dan Einstein, Hank Neuberger (producer), various artists
1987	German Afternoons	John Prine
1987	I'm Alright	Loudon Wainwright III
1987	Last of the True Believers	Nanci Griffith
1987	No Easy Walk to Freedom	Peter, Paul and Mary
1988
1988	Unfinished Business	Steve Goodman
1988	Asimbonanga	Joan Baez
1988	Annual Waltz	John Hartford
1988	More Love Songs	Loudon Wainwright III
1988	The Washington Squares	Washington Squares
1989
1989	Tracy Chapman	Tracy Chapman
1989	John Prine Live	John Prine
1989	Short Sharp Shocked	Michelle Shocked
1989	Emergency	Sweet Honey in the Rock
1989	Homeland - A Collection of Black South African Music	Clive Risko, Various Artists
1990
1990	Indigo Girls	Indigo Girls
1990	Bamboleo	Gipsy Kings
1990	Bayou Cadillac	BeauSoleil
1990	Crossroads	Tracy Chapman
1990	Old Friends	Guy Clark
1991
1991	Steady On	Shawn Colvin
1991	Days of Open Hand	Suzanne Vega
1991	"Hammer and a Nail"	Indigo Girls
1991	Helpless Heart	Maura O'Connell
1992
1992	The Missing Years	John Prine
1992	Live - Back On the Bus Y'all	Indigo Girls
1992	Cajun Conja	BeauSoleil
1992	Interiors	Rosanne Cash
1992	Jerry Garcia & David Grisman	Jerry Garcia, David Grisman
1993
1993	Another Country	The Chieftains
1993	Play Me Backwards	Joan Baez
1993	The Criminal Under My Own Hat	T-Bone Burnett
1993	Rites of Passage	Indigo Girls
1993	Arkansas Traveler	Michelle Shocked
1994
1994	Other Voices, Other Rooms	Nanci Griffith
1994	La Danse de la Vie	BeauSoleil
1994	Fat City	Shawn Colvin
1994	Good As I Been to You	Bob Dylan
1994	Spinning Around the Sun	Jimmie Dale Gilmore
1994	Breaking Silence	Janis Ian
1995
1995	American Recordings	Johnny Cash
1995	Cover Girl	Shawn Colvin
1995	My Life	Iris DeMent
1995	Flyer	Nanci Griffith
1995	Swamp Ophelia	Indigo Girls
1996
1996	Wrecking Ball	Emmylou Harris
1996	The Long Black Veil	The Chieftains
1996	MTV Unplugged	Bob Dylan
1996	Train a Comin'	Steve Earle
1996	Lost Dogs and Mixed Blessings	John Prine
1997
1997	The Ghost of Tom Joad	Bruce Springsteen
1997	Yonder	Jerry Douglas, Peter Rowan
1997	Braver New World	Jimmie Dale Gilmore
1997	You? Me? Us?	Richard Thompson
1997	Revival	Gillian Welch
1998
1998	Time Out of Mind	Bob Dylan
1998	Keepers	Guy Clark
1998	The Way I Should	Iris DeMent
1998	Shaming of the Sun	Indigo Girls
1998	Live on Tour	John Prine
1999
1999	Car Wheels on a Gravel Road	Lucinda Williams
1999	Mermaid Avenue	Billy Bragg & Wilco
1999	El Corazon	Steve Earle
1999	Spyboy	Emmylou Harris
1999	Step Inside This House	Lyle Lovett
2000
2000	Mule Variations	Tom Waits
2000	Cajunization	BeauSoleil
2000	Fellow Workers	Ani DiFranco & Utah Phillips
2000	In Spite of Ourselves	John Prine
2000	Western Wall: The Tucson Sessions	Linda Ronstadt & Emmylou Harris
2001
2001	Red Dirt Girl	Emmylou Harris
2001	Mermaid Avenue Vol. II	Billy Bragg & Wilco
2001	American III: Solitary Man	Johnny Cash
2001	Transcendental Blues	Steve Earle
2001	Crossing Muddy Waters	John Hiatt
2002
2002	Love and Theft	Bob Dylan
2002	Buddy & Julie Miller	Buddy Miller & Julie Miller
2002	Poet: A Tribute to Townes van Zandt	Various Artists
2002	Time (The Revelator)	Gillian Welch
2002	Essence	Lucinda Williams
2003
2003	This Side	Nickel Creek
2003	American IV: The Man Comes Around	Johnny Cash
2003	Down the Old Plank Road: The Nashville Sessions	The Chieftains
2003	Jerusalem	Steve Earle
2003	1000 Kisses	Patty Griffin
2004
2004	The Wind	Warren Zevon
2004	Rules of Travel	Rosanne Cash
2004	Stumble into Grace	Emmylou Harris
2004	Looking for the Moon	Tom Paxton
2004	World Without Tears	Lucinda Williams
2005
2005	The Revolution Starts... Now	Steve Earle
2005	Educated Guess	Ani DiFranco
2005	Land of Milk and Honey	Eliza Gilkyson
2005	Impossible Dream	Patty Griffin
2005	The Unbroken Circle - The Musical Heritage of the Carter Family	John Carter Cash, Various Artists
2006
2006	Fair & Square	John Prine
2006	Chávez Ravine	Ry Cooder
2006	The Outsider	Rodney Crowell
2006	Why Should the Fire Die?	Nickel Creek
2006	Devils & Dust	Bruce Springsteen
2007
2007	Modern Times	Bob Dylan
2007	Solo Acoustic, Vol. 1	Jackson Browne
2007	Black Cadillac	Rosanne Cash
2007	Workbench Songs	Guy Clark
2007	All the Roadrunning	Mark Knopfler & Emmylou Harris
2008
2008	Washington Square Serenade	Steve Earle
2008	The Calling	Mary Chapin Carpenter
2008	My Name Is Buddy	Ry Cooder
2008	Children Running Through	Patty Griffin
2008	Orphans	Tom Waits
2009
2009	Raising Sand	Robert Plant & Alison Krauss
2009	Day After Tomorrow	Joan Baez
2009	I, Flathead	Ry Cooder
2009	Sex & Gasoline	Rodney Crowell
2009	All I Intended to Be	Emmylou Harris
2010
2010	Townes	Steve Earle
2010	Middle Cyclone	Neko Case
2010	Our Bright Future	Tracy Chapman
2010	Live	Shawn Colvin
2010	Secret, Profane & Sugarcane	Elvis Costello
2011
2011	God Willin' and the Creek Don't Rise	Ray LaMontagne
2011	Love Is Strange: En Vivo Con Tino	Jackson Browne & David Lindley
2011	The Age of Miracles	Mary Chapin Carpenter
2011	Somedays the Song Writes You	Guy Clark
2011	Dream Attic	Richard Thompson

=== Best Folk Album, 2012-2025 ===
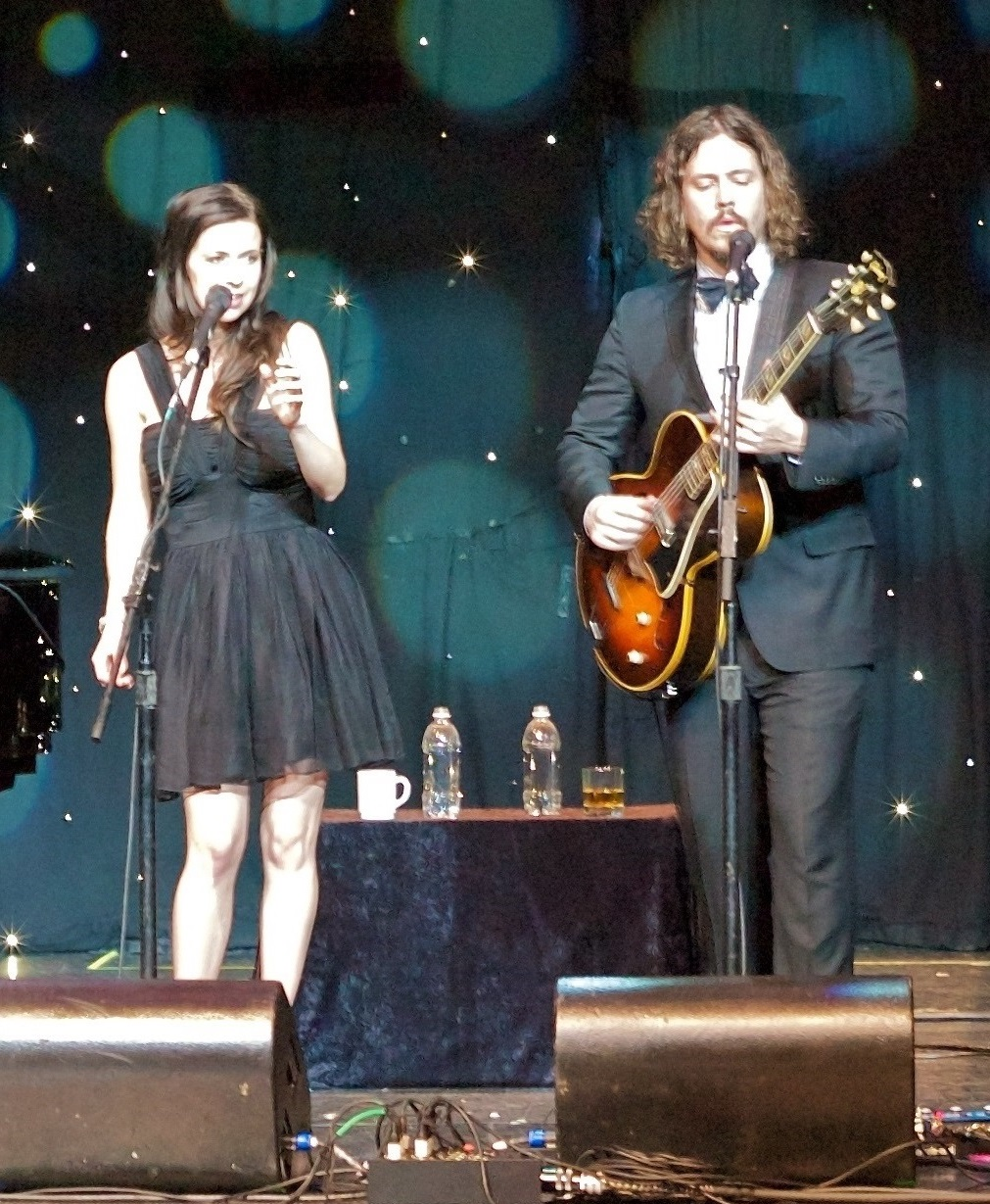
The Civil Wars are the inaugural winners of the combined award.

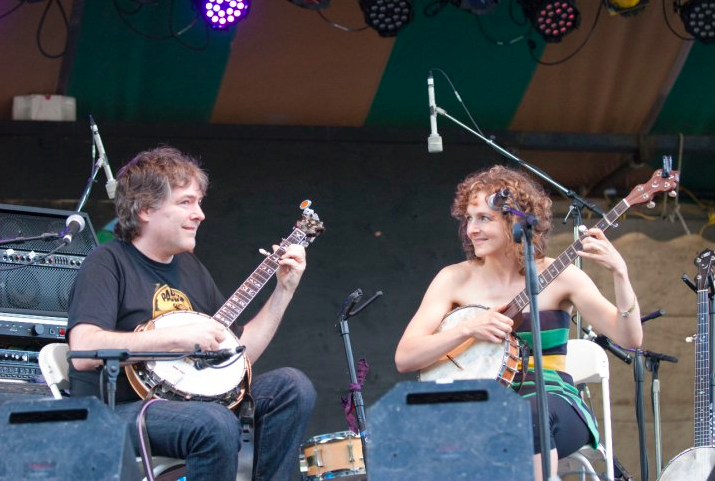
Husband and wife Béla Fleck and Abigail Washburn won the award in 2016.

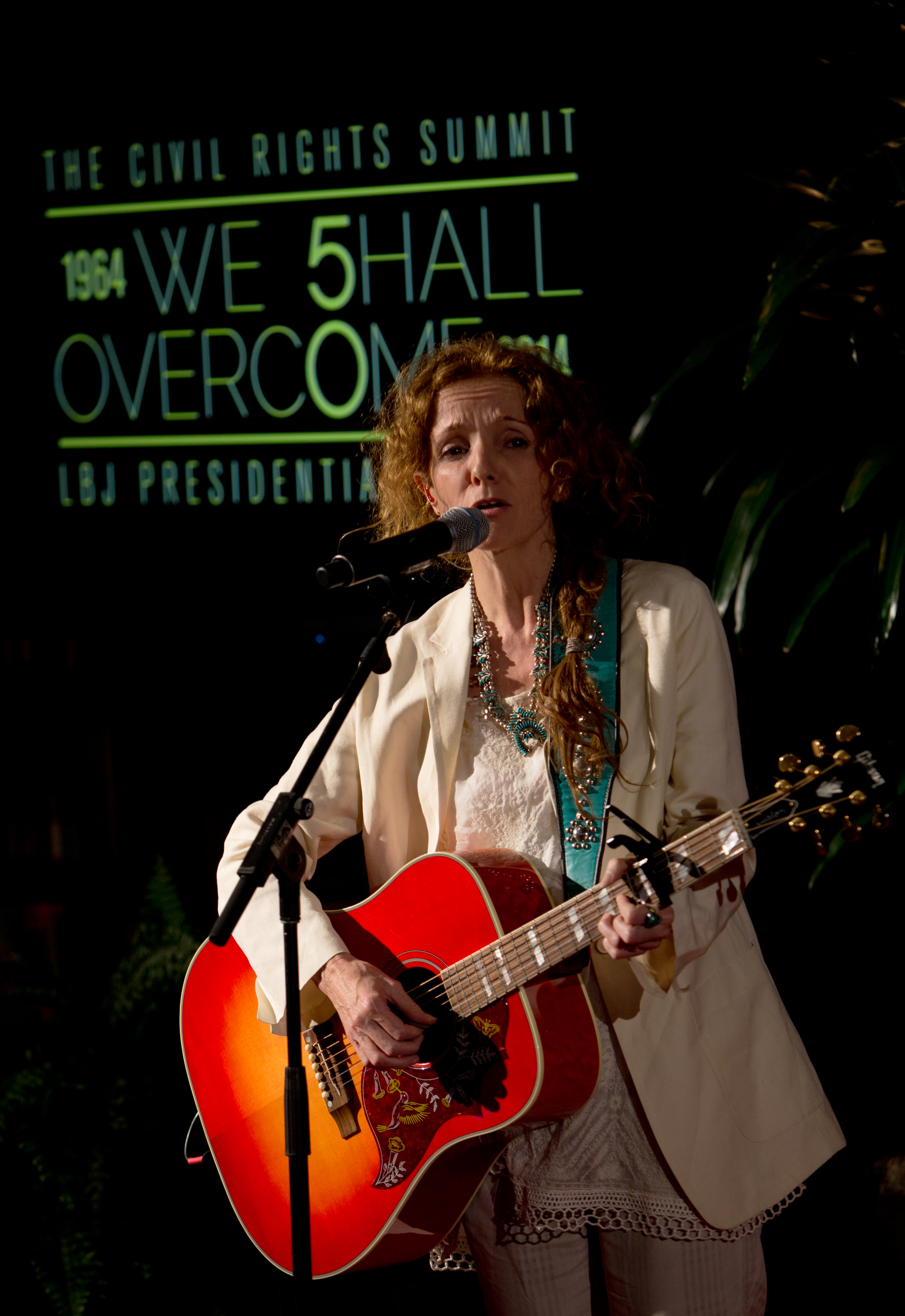
2020 recipient Patty Griffin.

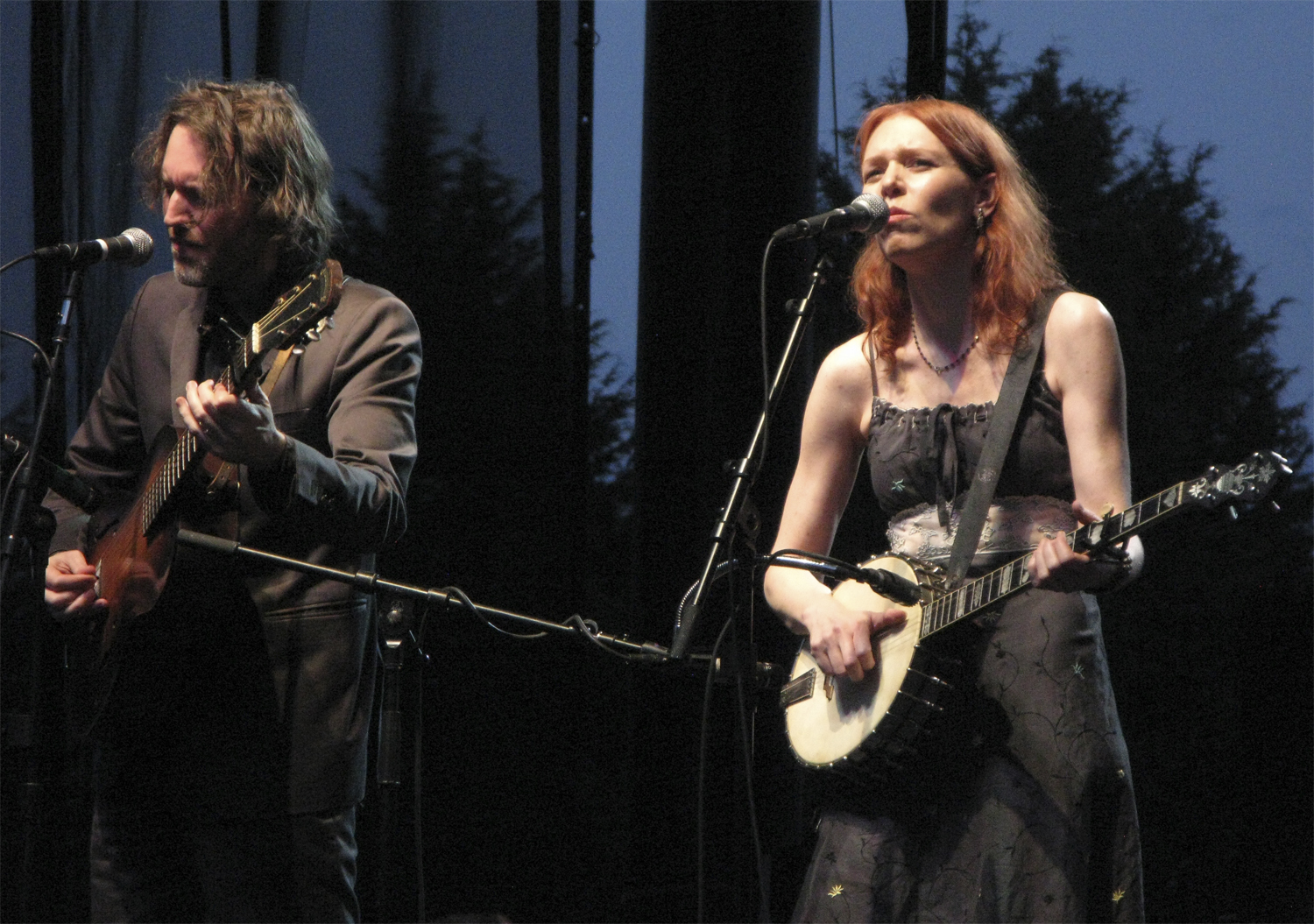
Musical partners and two-time winners David Rawlings and Gillian Welch.

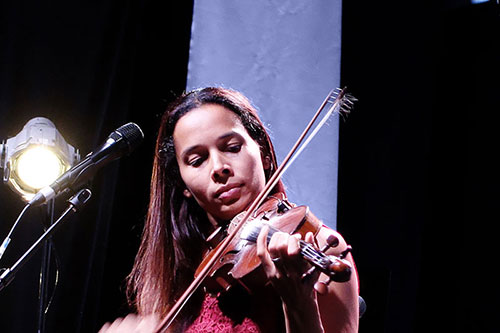
2022 winner and four-time nominee Rhiannon Giddens.

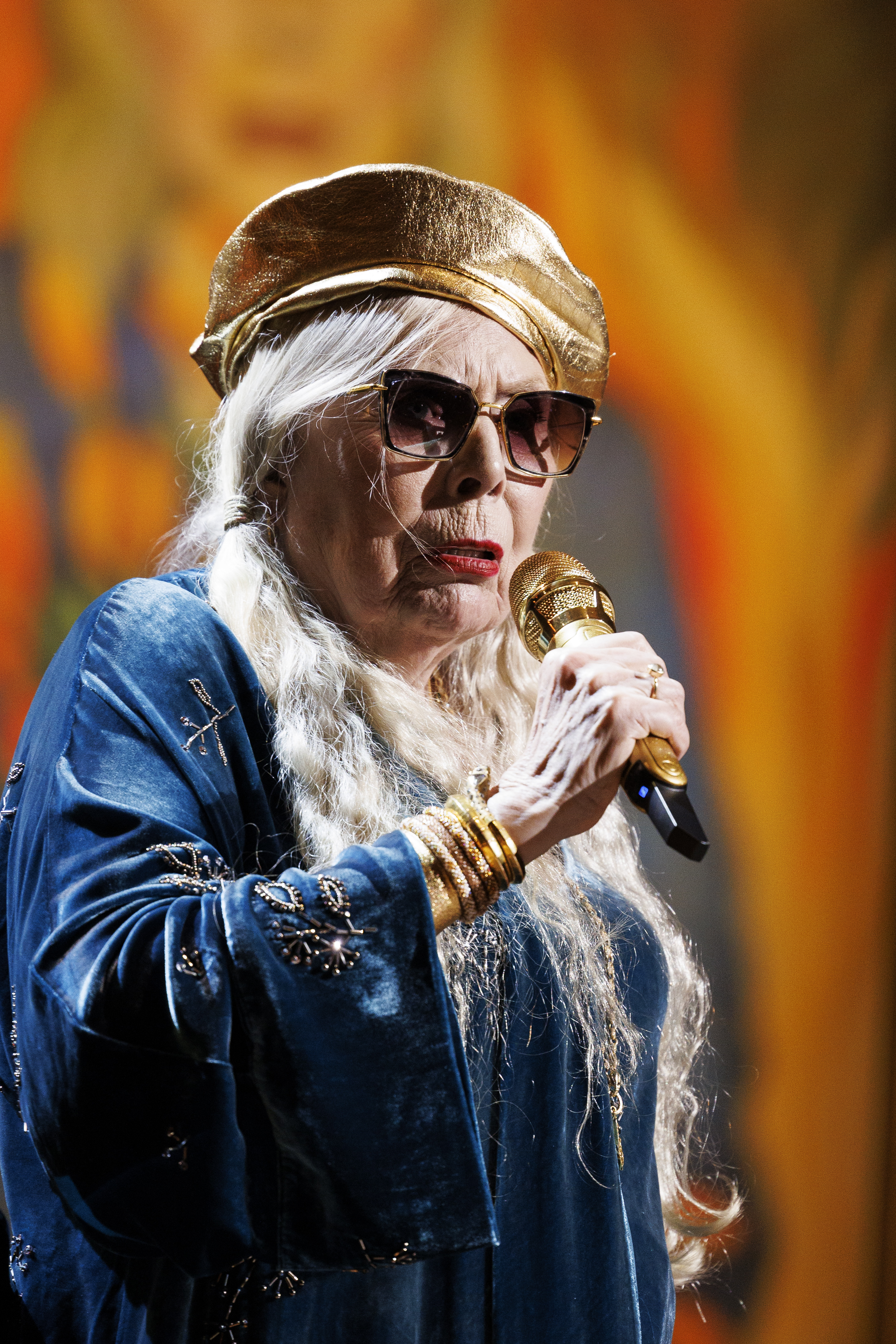
Joni Mitchell won in 2024 for her live album At Newport.

Year	Work	Artist
2012
2012	Barton Hollow	The Civil Wars
2012	The Harrow & the Harvest	Gillian Welch
2012	Helplessness Blues	Fleet Foxes
2012	I'll Never Get Out of This World Alive	Steve Earle
2012	Ukulele Songs	Eddie Vedder
2013
2013	The Goat Rodeo Sessions	Yo-Yo Ma, Stuart Duncan, Edgar Meyer and Chris Thile
2013	Election Special	Ry Cooder
2013	Leaving Eden	Carolina Chocolate Drops
2013	Hambone's Meditations	Luther Dickinson
2013	This One's to Him: A Tribute to Guy Clark	Shawn Camp and Tamara Saviano
2014
2014	My Favorite Picture of You	Guy Clark
2014	The Ash & Clay	The Milk Carton Kids
2014	Build Me Up From Bones	Sarah Jarosz
2014	Sweetheart of the Sun	The Greencards
2014	They All Played for Us: Arhoolie Records 50th Anniversary Celebration	Various Artists / Chris Strachwitz
2015
2015	Remedy	Old Crow Medicine Show
2015	Follow the Music	Alice Gerrard
2015	The Nocturne Diaries	Eliza Gilkyson
2015	A Reasonable Amount of Trouble	Jesse Winchester
2015	Three Bells	Mike Auldridge, Jerry Douglas and Rob Ickes
2016
2016	Béla Fleck & Abigail Washburn	Béla Fleck and Abigail Washburn
2016	Didn't He Ramble	Glen Hansard
2016	Servant of Love	Patty Griffin
2016	Tomorrow Is My Turn	Rhiannon Giddens
2016	Wood, Wire & Words	Norman Blake
2017
2017	Undercurrent	Sarah Jarosz
2017	Factory Girl	Rhiannon Giddens
2017	Silver Skies Blue	Judy Collins and Ari Hest
2017	Upland Stories	Robbie Fulks
2017	Weighted Mind	Sierra Hull
2018
2018	Mental Illness	Aimee Mann
2018	The Laughing Apple	Yusuf / Cat Stevens
2018	The Queen of Hearts	Offa Rex
2018	Semper Femina	Laura Marling
2018	You Don't Own Me Anymore	The Secret Sisters
2019
2019	All Ashore	Punch Brothers
2019	Black Cowboys	Dom Flemons
2019	Rifles & Rosary Beads	Mary Gauthier
2019	Weed Garden	Iron & Wine
2019	Whistle Down the Wind	Joan Baez
2020
2020	Patty Griffin	Patty Griffin
2020	Evening Machines	Gregory Alan Isakov
2020	Front Porch	Joy Williams
2020	My Finest Work Yet	Andrew Bird
2020	Rearrange My Heart	Che Apalache
2021
2021	All the Good Times (Are Past & Gone)	Gillian Welch and David Rawlings
2021	Bonny Light Horseman	Bonny Light Horseman
2021	Song for Our Daughter	Laura Marling
2021	Saturn Return	The Secret Sisters
2021	Thanks for the Dance	Leonard Cohen
2022
2022	They're Calling Me Home	Rhiannon Giddens with Francesco Turrisi
2022	Blue Heron Suite	Sarah Jarosz
2022	Long Violent History	Tyler Childers
2022	One Night Lonely (Live)	Mary Chapin Carpenter
2022	Wednesday (Extended Version)	Madison Cunningham
2023
2023	Revealer	Madison Cunningham
2023	Age of Apathy	Aoife O'Donovan
2023	Hell on Church Street	Punch Brothers
2023	The Light at the End of the Line	Janis Ian
2023	Spellbound	Judy Collins
2024
2024	At Newport (Live)	Joni Mitchell
2024	Celebrants	Nickel Creek
2024	Folkocracy	Rufus Wainwright
2024	I Only See the Moon	The Milk Carton Kids
2024	Jubilee	Old Crow Medicine Show
2024	Seven Psalms	Paul Simon
2024	Traveling Wildfire	Dom Flemons
2025
2025	Woodland	Gillian Welch and David Rawlings
2025	All My Friends	Aoife O'Donovan
2025	American Patchwork Quartet	American Patchwork Quartet
2025	Bright Future	Adrianne Lenker
2025	Weird Faith	Madi Diaz
2026
2026	Wild and Clear and Blue	I'm with Her
2026	Crown of Roses	Patty Griffin
2026	Foxes in the Snow	Jason Isbell
2026	Under the Powerlines (April 24 – September 24)	Jesse Welles
2026	What Did the Blackbird Say to the Crow	Rhiannon Giddens and Justin Robinson
2027	Ace	Madison Cunningham
2027	Bloodline	Mon Rovîa
2027	The Great Divide: The Last of the Bugs	Noah Kahan
2027	Le Sigh	Kris Angelis
2027	Lost Cause Lover Fool	The Milk Carton Kids

^{^[I]} Each year is linked to the article about the Grammy Awards held that year.

== Artists with multiple wins ==
3 wins

- Bob Dylan
- Chris Thile (one as a member of Nickel Creek, one as a member of the Punch Brothers)
- Steve Earle

2 wins

- Emmylou Harris
- Gillian Welch
- David Rawlings
- John Prine
- Sarah Jarosz (one as a member of the I'm with Her)

== Artists with multiple nominations ==
Includes nominations for Best Folk Album.

8 nominations

- Steve Earle

7 nominations

- Emmylou Harris
- John Prine

6 nominations

- Chris Thile (three as part of Nickel Creek, two as part of Punch Brothers)
- Patty Griffin
- Indigo Girls

5 nominations

- Guy Clark
- Bob Dylan
- Gillian Welch

4 nominations

- BeauSoleil
- Joan Baez
- Shawn Colvin
- Ry Cooder
- Rhiannon Giddens (one as part of The Carolina Chocolate Drops)
- Sarah Jarosz (one as part of I'm with Her)

3 nominations

- Mary Chapin Carpenter
- Johnny Cash
- Rosanne Cash
- Tracy Chapman
- The Chieftains
- Madison Cunningham
- Nanci Griffith
- The Milk Carton Kids
- Nickel Creek
- Aoife O'Donovan (one as part of I'm with Her)
- Lucinda Williams

2 nominations

- Billy Bragg
- Jackson Browne
- Judy Collins
- Rodney Crowell
- Iris DeMent
- Ani DiFranco
- Jerry Douglas
- Dom Flemons (one as part of The Carolina Chocolate Drops)
- Eliza Gilkyson
- Jimmie Dale Gilmore
- Janis Ian
- Laura Marling
- Punch Brothers
- Michelle Shocked
- Bruce Springsteen
- Richard Thompson
- Loudon Wainwright III
- Tom Waits
- Wilco
- Joy Williams (one as part of The Civil Wars)

== See also ==
- List of Grammy Award categories
- Grammy Award for Best Traditional Folk Album
- Grammy Award for Best Americana Album
