= Guy Clark (album) =

Studio album by Guy Clark
- Released: 1978
- Genre: Country
- Label: Warner Bros.
- Producer: Guy Clark

Guy Clark chronology
Texas Cookin' (1976)	Guy Clark (1978)	The South Coast of Texas (1981)

Guy Clark is the third studio album by the Texas singer-songwriter Guy Clark, released in 1978. It was his first on the Warner Bros. label. "Fools for Each Other" reached No. 96 in the Billboard country singles chart.

The song "Fools for Each Other" was covered by Johnny Rodriguez in 1979, reaching no. 14 on the country charts for that year. It was also later included in the albums, The Platinum Collection, The Essential Guy Clark, and Craftsman. Another version was recorded in 1986 as a duet by Lynn Anderson and Ed Bruce, which was included on Bruce's studio album, Night Things, peaking at No. 49 on the country charts as a single.

== Critical reception ==
Professional ratings
Review scores
Source	Rating
AllMusic	3.5/5 stars
The New Rolling Stone Record Guide	2/5 stars
The Virgin Encyclopedia of Seventies Music	3/5 stars

Record Collector wrote: "More experimental than the straight country of its predecessors, on which cellos and harpsichords dovetailed with more traditional Nashville instrumentation, Clark’s sly wit is in abundance on 'Comfort and Crazy' and 'Shade of All Greens'."

== Track listing ==
All songs written by Guy Clark except as noted.

1. "Fool on the Roof"
2. "Fools for Each Other"
3. "Shade of All Greens"
4. "Voilà, An American Dream" (Rodney Crowell)
5. "One Paper Kid" (Walter Cowart)
6. "In the Jailhouse Now" (Jimmie Rodgers)
7. "Comfort and Crazy"
8. "Don't You Take It Too Bad" (Townes Van Zandt)
9. "Houston Kid"
10. "Fool on the Roof Blues"

== Personnel ==
- Guy Clark – vocals, guitar
- Bee Spears – bass guitar
- Mickey Raphael – harmonica
- Lea Jane Berinati – keyboards, background vocals
- David Briggs – keyboards, background vocals
- Buck White – mandolin
- Don Brooks – harmonica
- Philip Donnelly – guitar
- Jack Hicks – banjo
- Jerry Kroon – drums
- Albert Lee – guitar
- John Goldthwaite – guitar
- Don Everly – background vocals
- Gordon Payne – background vocals
- Sharon Hicks – background vocals
- Rodney Crowell – background vocals
- Frank Davis – background vocals
- Cheryl White – background vocals
- Byron Bach – cello
