= Suzi Ragsdale =

American singer and songwriter (born 1964)

- Born: Suzanne Ragsdale; September 6, 1964 (age 61); Nashville, Tennessee
- Genres: Folk music
- Occupation: Musician
- Instruments: Guitar, piano, vocals
- Years active: 1990–present
- Labels: Clyde Records, VNS Records
- Website: suziragsdale.com

Suzanne Ragsdale (born September 6, 1964) is an American singer and songwriter. Besides her solo recordings, Ragsdale is known for her collaborations with Verlon Thompson and Darrell Scott.

== Biography ==
=== Early years ===
Ragsdale grew up in Nashville, the daughter of country/pop singer Ray Stevens (whose legal last name is Ragsdale). By age 10, she was singing on children's albums, and Ragsdale was singing on publishing demos for songwriters by age 11. She sang as part of the chorus on her father Ray Stevens’ song "Everything Is Beautiful", using the hymn, "Jesus Loves the Little Children."

Ragsdale provided background vocals for artists such as Guy Clark, Pam Tillis, Suzy Bogguss, Randy Travis, and Ian Tyson. In 1991, Ragsdale secured a publishing contract and wrote songs full-time.

=== Collaborations ===
Ragsdale collaborated with Verlon Thompson from 1990 until 1999, recording two duet albums on their own label VNS Records: Anything Goes (1993) and Out Of Our Hands (1995). Songs from these albums have been recorded by artists such as Anne Murray, Pam Tillis, Suzy Bogguss, Rodney Crowell, Lari White, and Billy Dean. Ragsdale and Thompson also performed and recorded with Guy Clark.

From 1992 until 2008, Ragsdale performed and recorded with Darrell Scott. She sang on Scott's albums, and Scott produced her first album.

=== Solo career ===
Ragsdale released her first solo album Future Past in 1998. From 1999 until 2000, Ragsdale resided in London, England, writing and performing in the UK and Europe. In 2007, she launched her Stark Raven/Clyde Records label. She recorded two EPs: Best Regards (2009) and Less of the Same (2010). The two discs were also reissued in one set in 2010.

=== Personal life ===
Ragsdale is a certified yoga and fitness instructor and an accomplished chef.

== Discography ==
=== Solo recordings ===
- 1998: Future Past (VNS)
- 2009: Best Regards EP (Stark Raven)
- 2010: Less of the Same EP (Stark Raven)

=== Suzi Ragsdale and Verlon Thompson ===
- 1993: Anything Goes (VNS Records)
- 1995: Out of Our Hands (VNS Records)

=== With Guy Clark ===
- 1992: Boats to Build (Asylum)
- 1995: Dublin Blues (Elektra)
- 1997: Keepers (Sugar Hill)

=== With Darrell Scott ===
- 1997: Aloha From Nashville (Sugar Hill)
- 1999: Family Tree (Sugar Hill)
- 2008: Modern Hymns (Appleseed)
- 2010: A Crooked Road (Full Light)

=== As composer ===
- 1993: Suzy Bogguss – Something Up My Sleeve (Liberty) – track 10, "Something Up My Sleeve" (co-written with Verlon Thompson)
- 1994: Lari White – Wishes (RCA) – track 5, "If I'm Not Already Crazy" (co-written with Verlon Thompson)
- 1998: Pam Tillis – Every Time (Arista Nashville) – track 10, "After Hours" (co-written with Verlon Thompson)
- 2010: Dierks Bentley – Up on the Ridge (Capitol Records Nashville) – track 6, "Bad Angel" (co-written with Verlon Thompson)
- 2015: Brian Ashley Jones – Out of the City (self-released) – track 4, "Out of the City" (co-written with Brian Ashley Jones)

=== Also appears on ===
- 1991: Hank Williams, Jr – Maverick (Curb MCA)
- 1992: Confederate Railroad – Confederate Railroad (Atlantic)
- 1994: Pat Alger – Notes and Grace Notes (Liberty)
- 1994: David Ball – Thinkin' Problem (Rhino / Warner Bros.)
- 1994: Confederate Railroad – Notorious (Atlantic)
- 1994: Tom Paxton – Wearing the Time (Sugar Hill)
- 1994: Randy Travis – This Is Me (Warner Bros.)
- 1994: Ian Tyson – Eighteen Inches of Rain (Vanguard)
- 1995: Pam Tillis – All of This Love (Arista Nashville)
- 1997: Joy Lynn White – Lucky Few (Little Dog / Mercury)
- 2000: Clay Greenberg – Tumbleweed (Home Grown)
- 2000: Jelly Roll Johnson – And a Few Close Friends (American Originals)
- 2005: Wayne Scott – This Weary Way (Full Light)
- 2008: Tom Paxton – Comedians & Angels (Appleseed)
- 2010: Watermelon Slim – Ringers (NorthernBlues)
