= Best of Guy Clark =

Greatest hits album by Guy Clark
- Released: 1982
- Genre: Country
- Label: RCA

Guy Clark chronology
The South Coast of Texas (1981)	Best of Guy Clark (1982)	Better Days (1983)

Professional ratings
Review scores
Source	Rating
Allmusic	2.5/5 stars

Best of Guy Clark is an album by American singer-songwriter Guy Clark, released in 1982.

Except for four tracks, it includes all of the songs released by Clark on his two albums on RCA. Both Old No. 1 and Texas Cookin' were re-issued on CD on the Camden label in 2001.

== Track listing ==
All songs by Guy Clark unless otherwise noted.

1. "Rita Ballou"
2. "L.A. Freeway"
3. "She Ain't Goin' Nowhere"
4. "That Old Time Feeling"
5. "Texas, 1947"
6. "Desperados Waiting for a Train"
7. "Instant Coffee Blues"
8. "A Nickel for the Fiddler"
9. "Texas Cookin' "
10. "Anyhow, I Love You"
11. "Virginia's Real"
12. "Broken Hearted People"
13. "Black Haired Boy" (Guy Clark, Susanna Clark)
14. "The Last Gunfighter Ballad "
15. "Let Him Roll"
16. "Like a Coat from the Cold"

== Personnel ==
- Guy Clark – vocals, guitar
