= Hindsight 21/20: Anthology 1975–1995 =

Hindsight 21-20: Anthology 1975–1995

Compilation album by Guy Clark
- Released: October 9, 2007
- Recorded: 1975–1995
- Genre: Country
- Label: Raven

Guy Clark chronology
Live from Austin, TX (2007)	Hindsight 21-20: Anthology 1975–1995 (2007)	The Platinum Collection (2008)

Professional ratings
Review scores
Source	Rating
Allmusic	4.5/5 stars

Hindsight 21-20: Anthology 1975–1995 is an album by American singer-songwriter Guy Clark, released in 2007.

This compilation is the first multi-label anthology of Clark's career, issued by the Australian label Raven Records.

== Track listing ==
All songs by Guy Clark unless otherwise noted.

1. "L.A. Freeway" – 4:58
2. "Rita Ballou" – 2:49
3. "She Ain't Goin' Nowhere" – 3:29
4. "Texas 1947" – 3:11
5. "Desperados Waiting for the Train" – 4:32
6. "Texas Cookin'" – 3:50
7. "Broken Hearted People" – 4:44
8. "The Last Gunfighter Ballad" – 2:51
9. "Comfort and Crazy" – 3:07
10. "The Houston Kid" – 4:00
11. "New Cut Road" – 3:43
12. "South Coast of Texas" – 3:48
13. "Heartbroke" – 3:02"
14. "She's Crazy For Leaving" (Clark, Rodney Crowell) – 2:55
15. "Homegrown Tomatoes" – 2:59
16. "The Randall Knife" [1983 version] – 4:11
17. "No Deal" (Townes Van Zandt) – 3:20
18. "Baton Rouge Clark, Crowley 2:48
19. "Boats to Build" (Clark, Verlon Thompson) – 3:49
20. "Dublin Blues" – 4:21
21. "The Cape" (Guy Clark, Susanna Clark, J. Janosky) – 3:39

== Personnel ==
- Guy Clark – vocals, guitar
