= Cold Dog Soup =

Cold Dog Soup may refer to:

- Cold Dog Soup (album), a 1999 album by Guy Clark
- Cold Dog Soup, a 1985 novel by Stephen Dobyns
  - Cold Dog Soup (film), a 1990 film directed by Alan Metter based on Dobyns' novel
