= Live from Austin, TX (Guy Clark album) =

Live album by Guy Clark
- Released: March 20, 2007
- Recorded: 1989 in Austin, Texas
- Genre: Country
- Label: New West
- Producers: Gary Briggs, Cameron Strang

Guy Clark chronology
Americana Master Series: Best of the Sugar Hill Years (2007)	Live from Austin, TX (2007)	Hindsight 21/20: Anthology 1975–1995 (2007)

Professional ratings
Review scores
Source	Rating
AllMusic	4/5 stars

Live from Austin, TX is a live album by American singer-songwriter Guy Clark, released in 2007. It was recorded during a 1989 taping of the television show Austin City Limits.

== Track listing ==
All songs by Guy Clark unless otherwise noted.

1. "Texas 1947" – 3:24
2. "L.A. Freeway (Pack Up All Your Dishes)" – 4:27
3. "The Carpenter" – 3:26
4. "Old Friends" (Guy Clark, Susanna Clark, Richard Dobson) – 3:52
5. "Come From the Heart" (Susanna Clark, Richard Leigh) – 3:05
6. "I'm All Through Throwing Good Love After Bad" (Clark, Leigh) – 2:39
7. "Randall Knife" – 4:28
8. "Immigrant Eyes" (Clark, Murrah) – 4:41
9. "Desperados Waiting for a Train" – 4:40
10. "The Last Gunfighter Ballad" – 2:56
11. "New Cut Road" – 4:14
12. "Better Days" – 3:20
13. "Homegrown Tomatoes" – 4:53
14. "To Live Is to Fly" (Townes Van Zandt) – 3:51
15. "Texas Cookin'" – 4:07

== Personnel ==
- Guy Clark – vocals, guitar
- Stuart Duncan – fiddle, mandolin
- Edgar Meyer – bass

== Production notes ==
- Jerry Tubb – mastering
- Chet Himes – mixing
- Lee Myers Jr. – engineer
- David Hough – engineer
- Scott Newton – photography
- Sue Meyer – design
