= A Love Letter to Stephen Sondheim =

Studio album by Judy Collins
- Released: March 3, 2017
- Recorded: May 2016
- Venue: Boettcher Concert Hall, Denver, Colorado
- Genre: Pop
- Length: 35:34
- Label: Cleopatra
- Producer: Alan Silverman; Judy Collins

Judy Collins chronology
Silver Skies Blue (2016)	A Love Letter to Stephen Sondheim (2017)	Everybody Knows (2017)

Professional ratings
Review scores
Source	Rating
The Arts Desk	3/5 stars

A Love Letter to Stephen Sondheim is a studio album by American singer Judy Collins, released on March 3, 2017, on Cleopatra Records under license from Wildflower Records.

== Overview ==
This project continues a series of tributes to the authors whose songs Collins performed during her career. Stephen Sondheim played an important role in the singer's career, for the performance of his song "Send In the Clowns" the singer received two Grammy Award nominations, the Judith album, on which it was included, sold a million copies in the United States.

In May 2016, at the Boettcher Concert Hall in Denver, the singer recorded an hour-long musical concert film A Love Letter to Stephen Sondheim, during which Collins performed his most popular compositions ("Not a Day Goes By", "Finishing the Hat", "Take Me to the World", "Anyone Can Whistle" and "I'm Still Here"), and also shared her memories of Sondheim and Broadway. The accompaniment was composed by pianist Russell Walden. The film was shown on television in the United States on August 26, 2016.

In February 2017, the singer decided to release a recording from the concert on DVD, followed by a studio album with the best numbers performed during the concert — on March 3, 2017, the album became available for purchase on CD and in digital format. The singer also gave several live performances with a new repertoire in 2017.

== Track listing ==
All tracks are written by Stephen Sondheim

No.	Title	Length
1.	"No One Is Alone"	3:07
2.	"Finishing the Hat"	2:55
3.	"Not While I'm Around"	2:51
4.	"Take Me to the World"	2:54
5.	"Liaisons"	4:58
6.	"Move On"	3:56
7.	"Not a Day Goes By"	3:26
8.	"Send In the Clowns"	3:58
9.	"I'm Still Here"	4:48
10.	"Anyone Can Whistle"	2:40
Total length:		35:34

== Personnel ==
- Judy Collins – vocals, production
- Alan Silverman – engineering, mixing, production
- Paul Rolnick – engineering, mixing
- Katherine Depaul – executive production
- Russell Walden – piano
- Miller Mobley – photography

Credits are adapted from the album's liner notes.
