= Strangers Again =

Strangers Again may refer to:

- Strangers Again (song), 1988 single by Holly Dunn
- Strangers Again (album), 2015 Judy Collins album
- Strangers Again (TV series), 2023 South Korean television series
- Strangers Again (Sheryl Crow song), 2017 song
