= The Dark (Guy Clark album) =

Studio album by Guy Clark
- Released: 2002
- Genre: Country
- Label: Sugar Hill
- Producer: Guy Clark, Verlon Thompson, Chris Latham Darrell Scott

Guy Clark chronology
Cold Dog Soup (1999)	The Dark (2002)	Workbench Songs (2006)

Professional ratings
Review scores
Source	Rating
Allmusic	4/5 stars

The Dark is an album by American singer-songwriter Guy Clark, released in 2002.

Clark is the co-writer on all songs except his cover of the Townes Van Zandt song "Rex's Blues" and "Soldier's Joy, 1864". The Dark is his first release without a solo composition. It also marks his return to the charts for the first time since Better Days.

Guests include Tim O'Brien and Gillian Welch.

== Track listing ==
1. "Mud" (Guy Clark, Buddy Mondlock) – 3:44
2. "Arizona Star" (Rich Alves, Clark) – 3:24
3. "Magnolia Wind" (Shawn Camp, Clark) – 3:49
4. "Soldier's Joy, 1864" (Camp, Clark) – 3:38
5. "Dancin' Days" (Clark, Steve Nelson) – 3:26
6. "Homeless" (Clark, Ray Stephenson) – 4:24
7. "Off the Map" (Clark, Nelson) – 3:44
8. "Bag of Bones" (Clark, Gary Nicholson) – 3:28
9. "She Loves to Ride Horses" (Clark, Keith Sykes) – 3:33
10. "Rex's Blues" (Townes Van Zandt) – 3:10
11. "Queenie's Song" (Terry Allen, Clark) – 2:38
12. "The Dark" (Clark, Mondlock) – 3:49

== Personnel ==
- Guy Clark – vocals, guitar
- Darrell Scott – banjo, dobro, guitar, mandolin, accordion, mandocello, bass, harmony vocals, marimbula
- Verlon Thompson – guitar, harmonica, mandolin, percussion, djembe, National steel guitar, harmony vocals
- Shawn Camp – fiddle
- Tim O'Brien – fiddle
- David Rawlings – harmony Vocals
- Gillian Welch – harmony Vocals

== Production notes ==
- Gene Eichelberger – mastering
- Chris Latham – engineer, mixing
- Senor McGuire – photography
- Sue Meyer – design

== Chart performance ==
Chart (2002)	Peak position
U.S. Billboard Top Country Albums	46
