= Strangers Again (album) =

Studio album by Judy Collins
- Released: September 18, 2015
- Recorded: 2015
- Studio: Avatar Studios, New York; The Green Room, Nesodden
- Genre: Pop; folk
- Length: 48:29
- Label: Wildflower
- Producer: Alan Silverman

Judy Collins chronology
Live in Ireland (2014)	Strangers Again (2015)	Silver Skies Blue (2016)

Strangers Again is the thirty-second studio album by American singer-songwriter Judy Collins, released on September 18, 2015, through her own label Wildflower Records. The album is a collection of twelve duets with male singers, with each of her chosen duet artists able to either sing a song of Collins' choice or offer their own.

== Critical reception ==
Professional ratings
Aggregate scores
Source	Rating
Metacritic	68/100
Review scores
Source	Rating
AllMusic	3.5/5 stars
Record Collector	3/5 stars

Timothy Monger of AllMusic gave the album high marks, praising almost every song, but singled out the duet "When I Go": "When Willie Nelson's timeless cracked tenor interweaves with Collins' dreamy musings on the moody, banjo-led 'When I Go,' it's the sound of two interpretive masters doing what they do best." Max Bell from Record Collector wrote: "It's that kind of affair: fine in parts but far too eclectic for its own good. Collins remains in fine fettle, though, and the choices are fair enough given her Broadway pedigree and eye for a standard. Definitely one for the fans. Everyone else? Not so much." Uncut noted that all male voices fade into the background before the clarity of Collins' own soprano voice.

== Track listing ==
Standard edition
No.	Title	Writer(s)	Length
1.	"Strangers Again" (with Ari Hest)	Ari Hest; Marvin Etzioni	4:24
2.	"Miracle River" (with Michael McDonald)	Amy Holland; Bernie Chiaravalle; John Goodwin	4:38
3.	"Belfast to Boston" (with Marc Cohn)	James Taylor	3:45
4.	"When I Go" (with Willie Nelson)	Dave Carter	4:25
5.	"Make Our Garden Grow" (with Jeff Bridges)	Richard Wilbur; Leonard Bernstein	3:28
6.	"Feels like Home" (with Jackson Browne)	Randy Newman	4:00
7.	"From Grace" (with Thomas Dybdahl)	Thomas Dybdahl	3:44
8.	"Hallelujah" (with Bhi Bhiman)	Leonard Cohen	4:38
9.	"Someday Soon" (with Jimmy Buffett)	Ian Tyson	3:21
10.	"Stars in My Eyes" (with Aled Jones)	Don Rollins; Jody Gray; Steve Walsh	3:47
11.	"Send In the Clowns" (with Don McLean)	Stephen Sondheim	3:52
12.	"Races" (with Glen Hansard)	Glen Hansard	4:37
Total length:			48:29

Deluxe edition bonus tracks
No.	Title	Writer(s)	Length
13.	"Last Thing on My Mind" (with Stephen Stills)	Tom Paxton	2:58
14.	"Diamonds and Rust" (with Joan Baez)	Joan Baez	3:55
15.	"When Your Eyes Close" (with Puressence)	Judy Collins	4:18
Total length:			59:20

== Charts ==
Chart performance for Strangers Again
Chart (2015)	Peak position
US Billboard 200	77
US Americana/Folk Albums (Billboard)	3
US Current Album Sales (Billboard)	42
US Independent Albums (Billboard)	14
