= Americana Master Series: Best of the Sugar Hill Years =

Greatest hits album by Guy Clark
- Released: March 13, 2007
- Genre: Country
- Length: Guy Clark, Verlon Thompson, Darrell Scott
- Label: Sugar Hill
- Producer: Guy Clark, Verlon Thompson, Miles Wilkinson, Darrell Scott

Guy Clark chronology
Workbench Songs (2006)	Americana Master Series: Best of the Sugar Hill Years (2007)	Live from Austin, TX (2007)

Professional ratings
Review scores
Source	Rating
Allmusic	3.5/5 stars

Americana Master Series: Best of the Sugar Hill Years is an album by American singer-songwriter Guy Clark, released in 2007.

== Track listing ==
1. "Magnolia Wind" (Shawn Camp, Clark) – 3:50
2. "Cold Dog Soup" (Clark, Mark Sanders) – 3:34
3. "Soldier's Joy, 1864" (Camp, Clark) – 3:40
4. "South Coast of Texas" (live; written by Clark) – 3:53
5. "Sis Draper" (Camp, Clark) – 3:42
6. "Mud" (Clark, Buddy Mondlock) – 3:45
7. "Ain't No Trouble to Me" (Clark, Jon Stewart) – 3:00
8. "A Little of Both" (live; written by Clark, Verlon Thompson) – 3:41
9. "Dancin Days" (Clark, Steve Nelson) – 3:27
10. "Fort Worth Blues" (Steve Earle) – 4:31
11. "Red River" (Clark) – 3:03
12. "Arizona Star" (Rich Alves, Clark) – 3:25
13. "Bunkhouse Blues" (Clark, Thompson) – 3:06
14. "Queenie's Song" (Terry Allen, Clark) – 2:38
15. "Out in the Parking Lot" (live; written by Clark, Darrell Scott) – 4:20

== Personnel ==
- Guy Clark – vocals, guitar
- Shawn Camp – fiddle, guitar, harmony vocals
- Travis Clark – bass
- Emmylou Harris – harmony vocals
- Tim O'Brien – fiddle
- Suzy Ragsdale – accordion, harmony vocals
- David Rawlings – harmony vocals
- Darrell Scott – banjo, dobro, guitar, mandolin, accordion, mandocello, bass, harmony vocals, marimbula, mandocello
- Verlon Thompson – guitar, harmonica, mandolin, harmony vocals, percussion, National Steel guitar, banjo
- Gillian Welch – harmony vocals
