= Dublin Blues =

Studio album by Guy Clark
- Released: April 4, 1995
- Genre: Country
- Length: 41:25
- Label: Asylum
- Producer: Miles Wilkinson

Guy Clark chronology
Boats to Build (1992)	Dublin Blues (1995)	Craftsman (1995)

Dublin Blues is an album by the American singer-songwriter Guy Clark, released in 1995. Clark promoted the album by touring with son, Travis, as his bass player. An additional song, "Once More With Caution", was included as a bonus download with the 30th Anniversary version of the album in 2025.

== Production ==
Rodney Crowell cowrote "Stuff That Works". Nanci Griffith and Emmylou Harris contributed harmony vocals.

== Critical reception ==
Professional ratings
Review scores
Source	Rating
AllMusic	4.5/5 stars
Calgary Herald	A
The Encyclopedia of Popular Music	3/5 stars
Entertainment Weekly	A−
The Indianapolis Star	4/4 stars

Entertainment Weekly praised the "tongue-and-groove meditations on life and love." The Salt Lake Tribune noted that "Clark can take ordinary conversation and turn it into a song—an underrated skill that's not as easy as it appears." The Indianapolis Star determined that "powerful poetic phrases, impressionable and hummable melodies, stunning storytelling and a living-room intimacy don't even come close to describing this collection."

== Track listing ==
1. "Dublin Blues" (Guy Clark) – 4:19
2. "Black Diamond Strings" (Clark) – 3:49
3. "Shut Up and Talk to Me" (Clark, Susanna Clark, Keith Sykes) – 3:30
4. "Stuff That Works" (Clark, Rodney Crowell) – 5:04
5. "Hank Williams Said It Best" (Clark) – 4:43
6. "The Cape" (Clark, Susanna Clark, Jim Janosky) – 3:39
7. "Baby Took a Limo to Memphis" (Clark) – 4:08
8. "Tryin' to Try" (Clark, Jimmie Fadden) – 3:11
9. "Hangin' Your Life on the Wall" (Clark, Verlon Thompson) – 3:30
10. "The Randall Knife" (Clark) – 5:31

== Personnel ==
=== Musicians ===
- Guy Clark – vocals, guitar
- Sam Bush – mandolin
- Travis Clark – bass
- Donivan Cowart – background vocals
- Rodney Crowell – guitar, background vocals
- Ramblin' Jack Elliott – background vocals
- Nanci Griffith – background vocals
- Emmylou Harris – background vocals
- Jelly Roll Johnson – harmonica
- Kenny Malone – drums, percussion, conga, tambourine, triangle, shaker, bell tree, Irish drum
- Kathy Mattea – background vocals
- Suzi Ragsdale – background vocals
- Darrell Scott – guitar, dobro, mandolin, penny whistle, slide guitar
- Verlon Thompson – guitar, harmonica, background vocals
- Jonathan Yudkin – violin

=== Production ===
- Miles Wilkinson – producer, engineer, mixing
- Carlos Grier – mastering
- Denny Purcell – mastering
- Darrell Scott – mixing
- Bill Tyler – art direction, design
- Senor McGuire – photography

== Cover versions ==
- Chris Carrabba covered "The Cape" on his album Covered in the Flood.
- Mipso covered "Dublin Blues" as a single released in 2022.
