= Workbench Songs =

Studio album by Guy Clark
- Released: July 10, 2006
- Genre: Country
- Label: Dualtone Records
- Producer: Guy Clark, Verlon Thompson, Chris Latham

Guy Clark chronology
The Dark (2002)	Workbench Songs (2006)	Americana Master Series: Best of the Sugar Hill Years (2007)

Professional ratings
Review scores
Source	Rating
Country Standard Time	(favourable)

Workbench Songs is an album by American singer-songwriter Guy Clark, released on July 10, 2006. It was nominated for "Best Contemporary Folk/Americana Album" at the Grammy Awards.

== Track listing ==
1. "Walking Man" (Guy Clark, Steve Nelson) – 3:02
2. "Magdalene" (Clark, Ray Stephenson) – 4:09
3. "Tornado Time in Texas" (Clark, Verlon Thompson) – 3:26
4. "Funny Bone" (Clark, Ray Stephenson) – 3:56
5. "Exposé" (Clark, Rodney Crowell, Hank DeVito) – 2:19
6. "Out in the Parkin' Lot" (Clark, Darrell Scott) – 4:51
7. "No Lonesome Tune" (Townes Van Zandt) – 4:03
8. "Cinco de Mayo in Memphis" (Clark, Chuck Mead) – 3:05
9. "Analog Girl" (Clark, Verlon Thompson) – 3:34
10. "Worry B Gone" (Clark, Gary Nicholson, Lee Roy Parnell) – 3:14
11. "Diamond Joe" (Traditional) – 2:51

== Personnel ==
- Guy Clark – vocals, guitar
- Eddie Bayers – drums, percussion
- Bryn Bright – bass, cello, harmony vocals
- Shawn Camp – fiddle, guitar, mandolin, harmony vocals
- Kevin Grantt – bass, piano
- Morgane Hayes – harmony vocals
- Wayne Killius – drums
- Chris Latham – guitar, violin, keyboards, trumpet, viola
- Verlon Thompson – guitar, harmonica, mandolin, harmony vocals

== Production notes ==
- Chris Latham – engineer, mixing, mastering
- Gina R. Binkley – design

== Chart positions ==
Year	Chart	Position
2006	Billboard Top Country albums	74
