= Boats to Build =

Studio album by Guy Clark
- Released: 1992
- Genre: Country
- Length: 31:22
- Label: Elektra
- Producer: Miles Wilkinson

Guy Clark chronology
Old Friends (1988)	Boats to Build (1992)	Dublin Blues (1995)

Professional ratings
Review scores
Source	Rating
Allmusic	4/5 stars

Boats to Build is an album by American singer-songwriter Guy Clark, released in 1992.

Guests include Sam Bush, Rodney Crowell, Marty Stuart, Emmylou Harris and Jerry Douglas.

== Track listing ==
1. "Baton Rouge" (Clark, J. C. Crowley) – 2:46
2. "Picasso's Mandolin" (Clark, Radney Foster, Bill Lloyd) – 2:50
3. "How'd You Get This Number" (Guy Clark, Susanna Clark) – 3:30
4. "Boats to Build" (Clark, Verlon Thompson) – 3:45
5. "Too Much" (Clark, Lee Roy Parnell) – 2:51
6. "Ramblin' Jack & Mahan" (Clark, Richard Leigh) – 3:40
7. "I Don't Love You Much Do I" (Clark, Richard Leigh) – 2:36
8. "Jack of All Trades" (Clark, Rodney Crowell) – 3:36
9. "Madonna w/Child ca. 1969" (Clark) – 2:56
10. "Must Be My Baby" (Clark) – 2:52

== Personnel ==
- Guy Clark – vocals, guitar
- Brian Ahern – guitar
- Sam Bush – mandolin
- Bill Caswell – jaw harp
- Travis Clark – bass
- Rodney Crowell – background vocals
- Jerry Douglas – dobro, Slide Guitar
- Radney Foster – background vocals
- Emmylou Harris – background vocals
- Bill Lloyd – guitar, background vocals
- Kenny Malone – drums, percussion, conga
- Lee Roy Parnell – slide guitar
- Suzi Ragsdale – background vocals
- Marty Stuart – mandolin
- Verlon Thompson – guitar, background vocals

== Production notes ==
- Miles Wilkinson – producer
- Carlos Grier – engineer, mastering
- Ben Sandmel – liner notes
- Aimee MacAuley – design
- Jim McGuire – photography
