= My Favorite Picture of You =

Studio album by Guy Clark
- Released: July 23, 2013
- Genre: Country
- Length: 43:33
- Label: Dualtone

Guy Clark chronology
| Songs and Stories (2011) | My Favorite Picture of You (2013) |

Professional ratings
Aggregate scores
| Source | Rating |
|---|---|
| Metacritic | 85/100 |
Review scores
| Source | Rating |
| AllMusic | 4.5/5 stars |
| American Songwriter | 4.5/5 stars |
| Chicago Tribune | 3.5/4 stars |
| Mojo | 4/5 stars |
| Nash Country Weekly | A− |
| The Observer | 4/5 stars |
| PopMatters | 7/10 |
| Q | 4/5 stars |
| Record Collector | 4/5 stars |
| Uncut | 8/10 |

My Favorite Picture of You is the fourteenth and final studio album by American singer-songwriter Guy Clark before his death in May 2016. The album was released in July 2013 under Dualtone Records, and won the 2014 Grammy Award for Best Folk Album.

== Track list ==
| No. | Title | Length |
|---|---|---|
| 1. | "Cornmeal Waltz" | 5:38 |
| 2. | "My Favorite Picture of You" | 3:32 |
| 3. | "Hell Bent On A Heartache" | 3:34 |
| 4. | "El Coyote" | 3:52 |
| 5. | "Heroes" | 3:41 |
| 6. | "Rain in Durango" | 4:45 |
| 7. | "Good Advice" | 3:15 |
| 8. | "The Death of Sis Draper" | 3:46 |
| 9. | "Waltzing Fool" | 4:09 |
| 10. | "The High Price of Inspiration" | 3:11 |
| 11. | "I'll Show Me" | 4:10 |

== Personnel ==
- Shawn Camp – banjo, fiddle, acoustic guitar, resonator guitar, mandolin, octave fiddle, background vocals
- Guy Clark – acoustic guitar, lead vocals
- Bryn Davies – bass guitar, cello, background vocals
- Chris Latham – acoustic guitar, resonator guitar, viola, violin, background vocals
- Noel McKay – nylon string guitar
- Gordie Sampson – acoustic guitar
- Morgane Stapleton – background vocals
- Verlon Thompson – acoustic guitar, background vocals

== Chart performance ==
| Chart (2013) | Peak position |
|---|---|
| US Billboard 200 | 62 |
| US Top Country Albums (Billboard) | 12 |
| US Americana/Folk Albums (Billboard) | 5 |
| US Independent Albums (Billboard) | 14 |
