= Craftsman (album) =

Compilation album by Guy Clark
- Released: 1995
- Genre: Country
- Length: 99:09
- Label: Rounder/Philo

Guy Clark chronology
| Dublin Blues (1995) | Craftsman (1995) | Keepers (1997) |

Professional ratings
Review scores
| Source | Rating |
|---|---|
| Allmusic | 4.5/5 stars |

Craftsman is an album by American singer-songwriter Guy Clark, released in 1995. It is a 30-song double-CD collection that includes all of Clark's late-1970s and 1980s recordings for Warner Bros. Guy Clark, The South Coast of Texas, and Better Days. The album was reviewed as being a collection of "some of Clark's finest work", containing "tales of drifters, smuggles, old-fiddle players, wild-eyed girls in cowboy bars, life on the south coast of Texas, waitresses in cheap hotels, the joys of homegrown tomatoes, carpenters and lots of finely crafted, highly original love songs".

== Track listing ==
All songs by Guy Clark unless otherwise noted.

1. "Fool on the Roof" – 4:09
2. "Fools for Each Other" – 4:15
3. "Shade of All Greens" – 3:13
4. "Voilà, An American Dream" – 3:46
5. "One Paper Kid" (Walter Cowart) – 3:24
6. "In the Jailhouse Now" (Jimmie Rodgers) – 3:47
7. "Comfort and Crazy" – 3:06
8. "Don't You Take It Too Bad" (Townes Van Zandt) – 4:02
9. "The Houston Kid" – 3:59
10. "Fool on the Roof" – 2:33
11. "Who Do You Think You Are" – 3:24
12. "Crystelle" – 3:02
13. "New Cut Road" – 3:42
14. "Rita Ballou " – 3:10
15. "South Coast of Texas" – 3:45
16. "Heartbroke" – 3:00
17. "The Partner Nobody Chose" (Clark, Crowell) – 3:06
18. "She's Crazy for Leavin'" (Clark, Crowell) – 2:52
19. "Calf-Rope" – 2:33
20. "Lone Star Hotel" – 3:20
21. "Blowin' Like a Bandit" – 2:37
22. "Better Days" – 3:00
23. "Homegrown Tomatoes" – 2:56
24. "Supply and Demand" – 3:12
25. "Randall Knife" [1983 version] – 4:08
26. "The Carpenter" – 3:11
27. "Uncertain Texas" (Crowell, Dobson) – 2:25
28. "No Deal" (Van Zandt) – 3:16
29. "Tears" – 2:46
30. "Fool in the Mirror" – 3:30

== Personnel ==
- Byron Bach – cello
- Richard Bennett – concertina, acoustic guitar, electric guitar, lap steel guitar, slide guitar, triangle
- Lea Jane Berinati – background vocals
- David Briggs – clavinet, harpsichord, piano, electric piano
- Don Brooks – harmonica
- Tony Brown – keyboards
- Rosanne Cash – background vocals
- Guy Clark – lead vocals, acoustic guitar
- Rodney Crowell – acoustic guitar, background vocals
- Frank Davis – background vocals
- Hank DeVito – acoustic guitar, electric guitar, steel guitar
- Philip Donnelly – acoustic guitar, electric guitar
- Buddy Emmons – steel guitar, slide guitar
- Don Everly – background vocals
- Vince Gill – acoustic guitar, electric guitar, background vocals
- Johnny Gimble – fiddle, mandolin
- Emory Gordy Jr. – bass guitar, acoustic guitar, mandolin, piano
- Glen D. Hardin – keyboards
- Jack Hicks – steel guitar, slide guitar
- Sharon Hicks – background vocals
- Wayne Jackson – flugelhorn
- Paul Kennerley – background vocals
- Jerry Kroon – drums
- Lawrence Lasson – violin
- Albert Lee – electric guitar, background vocals
- Larrie Londin – drums, percussion
- Farrell Morris – steel drums, percussion, shaker
- Gary Nicholson – acoustic guitar, electric guitar
- Kay Oslin – background vocals
- Gordon Payne – background vocals
- Mickey Raphael – harmonica
- Frank Rechard – electric guitar
- Lisa Silver – violin
- Ricky Skaggs – fiddle, background vocals
- Bee Spears – bass guitar
- Buck White – mandolin
- Cheryl White – background vocals
- Kris Wilkinson – viola
- Larry Willoughby – background vocals
- Stephanie Woolf – viola
- Reggie Young – electric guitar
