= One World (John Denver album) =

Studio album by John Denver
- Released: June 1986
- Genre: Country folk
- Length: 43:30
- Label: RCA
- Producers: Roger Nichols; Milton Okun – Executive Producer

John Denver chronology
Dreamland Express (1985)	One World (1986)	Higher Ground (1988)

Singles from One World
- 1. "Let Us Begin (What Are We Making Weapons For?)" Released: March 1986; 2. "Flying For Me" Released: June 1986; 3. "Along for the Ride ('56 T-Bird)" Released: July 1986

Professional ratings
Review scores
Source	Rating
Allmusic	2/5 stars

One World is the nineteenth studio album by American singer-songwriter John Denver. Released in June 1986, this was Denver's final studio album for RCA Records. The singles released from this album were "Along For The Ride ('56 T-Bird)" and "Let Us Begin (What Are We Making Weapons For)/"Flying For Me." "Let Us Begin" was later re-recorded in Russia with Alexander Gradsky. "Flying For Me" was written in honor of the passengers aboard the space shuttle Challenger.

== Track listing ==
All tracks composed by John Denver; except where indicated

=== Side one ===
1. "Love Is the Master" – 2:39
2. "Love Again" – 2:50
3. "I Remember You" – 2:48 (Johnny Mercer, Victor Schertzinger)
4. "Hey There, Mr. Lonely Heart" – 3:55
5. "Let Us Begin (What Are We Making Weapons For?)" – 5:54
6. "Flying for Me" – 5:34

=== Side two ===
1. "Along for the Ride ('56 T-Bird)" – 4:47 (Danny O'Keefe, Bill Braun)
2. "I Can't Escape" – 3:36
3. "True Love Takes Time" – 4:07 (Dik Darnell, Denver)
4. "One World" – 4:09
5. "It's a Possibility" – 3:11

== Personnel ==
- John Denver – guitar, vocals
- Paulinho Da Costa – percussion
- James Burton – guitar
- Sid Sharp – concertmaster
- Alf Clausen – orchestral arrangements
- Glen Hardin – piano
- Jerry Scheff – bass
- Jerry Carrigan – drums
- Dean Parks – guitar
- Patti Austin – background singer
- Conrad Reeder – background singer
- Denny Brooks – background singer
- Elizabeth Lamers – background singer

== Charts ==
Chart (1986)	Peak position
Australia (Kent Music Report)	90
