= Higher Ground (John Denver album) =

Studio album by John Denver
- Released: June 26, 1988 (AUS); September 29, 1988 (US)
- Genre: Country, pop
- Length: 41:35
- Label: Windstar (United States); RCA (International)
- Producer: John Denver, Roger Nichols

John Denver chronology
| One World (1986) | Higher Ground (1988) | Earth Songs (1990) |

Professional ratings
Review scores
| Source | Rating |
|---|---|
| Allmusic | 3/5 stars |

Higher Ground is the twentieth studio album by American singer-songwriter John Denver. Released in September 1988, it was his first studio album on the Windstar label. It was recorded at Denver's private studio in Snowmass, Colorado, with the exception of "For You" and the didjeridu part in "Sing Australia." These were recorded in Sydney. The album shares its title with Denver's television movie "Higher Ground", which uses the album's title song as its opening theme.

Two charting singles were released from the LP, "For You," a Top 40 hit in Australia, and "Country Girl in Paris," a minor hit in the U.S. The album also includes a cover of Guy Clark's song "Homegrown Tomatoes," a 1981 US Country hit.

== Track listing ==
All songs were written by John Denver, unless stated otherwise.

Side one
| No. | Title | Writer(s) | Length |
|---|---|---|---|
| 1. | "Higher Ground" | John Denver; Lee Holdridge; Joe Henry | 3:35 |
| 2. | "Homegrown Tomatoes" | Guy Clark | 3:20 |
| 3. | "Whispering Jesse" | | 3:03 |
| 4. | "Never a Doubt" | | 3:43 |
| 5. | "Deal with the Ladies" | | 1:38 |
| 6. | "Sing Australia" | | 4:38 |

Side two
| No. | Title | Writer(s) | Length |
|---|---|---|---|
| 7. | "A Country Girl in Paris" | | 3:47 |
| 8. | "For You" | | 3:21 |
| 9. | "All This Joy" | Denver; Glen D. Hardin | 4:33 |
| 10. | "Falling Leaves (The Refugees)" | | 3:38 |
| 11. | "Bread and Roses" | Mimi Fariña; Jim Oppenheim | 4:02 |
| 12. | "Alaska and Me" | | 2:43 |

== Chart performance ==
=== Album ===
| Chart (1988) | Peak position |
|---|---|
| Australian (ARIA Charts) | 5 |
| U.S. Billboard Top Country Albums | 49 |

=== Singles ===
| Year | Single | Peak positions | |
| Year | Single | US Country | AUS |
|---|---|---|---|
| 1988 | "Country Girl in Paris" | 96 | — |
| 1988 | "For You" | — | 21 |

== Certification ==
| Region | Certification | Certified units/sales |
|---|---|---|
| Australia (ARIA) | Gold | 35,000^{^} |
^{^} Shipments figures based on certification alone.

== Personnel ==
- John Denver – guitar, vocals
- Daryl Burgess - drums
- James Burton – guitar
- Glen Hardin – piano
- Jim Horn - saxophone, flute, recorder
- Richard Mellick – piano on "For You"
- Jerry Scheff – bass
- Russell Powell - guitar
- Lee Holdridge – string arrangements
- Danny Wheatman – mandolin, fiddle, harmonica
- Christy O'Leary – uilleann pipes
- Arthur Lazenby – banjo
- Alf Clausen – string arrangements
- Strings Plus – orchestra
- Jim McGillveray – percussion
- Charlie McMahon – didjeridu
