= The Essential Guy Clark =

Greatest hits album by Guy Clark
- Released: January 28, 1997
- Recorded: November 1975 – December 1978
- Genre: Country
- Length: 72:32
- Label: RCA

Guy Clark chronology
Keepers (1997)	The Essential Guy Clark (1997)	Cold Dog Soup (1999)

Alternative cover
- Audiophile re-release cover

Professional ratings
Review scores
Source	Rating
Allmusic	3/5 stars

The Essential Guy Clark is a compilation album by American singer-songwriter Guy Clark, released in 1997.

RCA had previously released Guy Clark – Greatest Hits in 1983 which included nearly all the songs from Clark's first two albums. This compilation includes the missing tracks. In addition, it contains the previously unreleased "Don't Let the Sunshine Fool You" (composed by Clark, but first released by Townes Van Zandt on The Late Great Townes Van Zandt in 1972). All the tracks have been re-mastered.

The compilation was re-released by Audiophile Classics in 2004 with different cover art.

== Track listing ==
All songs by Guy Clark unless otherwise noted.

1. "Texas, 1947" – 3:10
2. "Desperados Waiting for a Train" – 4:31
3. "Like a Coat from the Cold" – 3:20
4. "Instant Coffee Blues" – 3:17
5. "Let Him Roll" – 4:05
6. "Rita Ballou" – 2:49
7. "L.A. Freeway" – 4:57
8. "She Ain't Goin' Nowhere" – 3:28
9. "A Nickel for the Fiddler" – 2:48
10. "That Old Time Feeling" – 4:14
11. "Texas Cookin'" – 3:48
12. "Anyhow, I Love You" – 3:54
13. "Virginia's Real" – 2:59
14. "Broken Hearted People" – 4:43
15. "Black Haired Boy" (Guy Clark, Susanna Clark) – 3:09
16. "Me I'm Feeling the Same" – 3:32
17. "The Ballad of Laverne and Captain Flint" – 3:51
18. "Don't Let the Sunshine Fool You" – 2:54
19. "The Last Gunfighter Ballad" – 2:50
20. "Fools for Each Other" – 4:13
