= The South Coast of Texas =

Studio album by Guy Clark
- Released: 1981
- Recorded: Los Angeles, CA
- Label: Warner Bros.
- Producer: Rodney Crowell

Guy Clark chronology
Guy Clark (1978)	The South Coast of Texas (1981)	Best of Guy Clark (1982)

The South Coast of Texas is the fourth studio album by Texas singer-songwriter Guy Clark, released in 1981.

Guests include Ricky Skaggs, Rosanne Cash and Vince Gill as well as numerous well-known session players. Skaggs would later have a hit with "Heartbroke", and Rodney Crowell, who produced the album, with "She's Crazy for Leavin'".

== Reception ==
Professional ratings
Review scores
Source	Rating
Allmusic	3/5 stars

Allmusic stated in its review: "South Coast of Texas was a transition album toward the mature Clark style, one that was first to emerge on his next album, Better Days. It's not a landmark in his catalog, but neither is it anything that could remotely be considered a failure."

== Track listing ==
All songs written by Guy Clark except as noted.

1. "Who Do You Think You Are" – 3:26
2. "Crystelle" – 3:05
3. "New Cut Road" – 3:45
4. "Rita Ballou" – 3:14
5. "South Coast of Texas" – 3:48
6. "Heartbroke" – 2:58
7. "The Partner Nobody Chose" (Guy Clark, Rodney Crowell) – 3:08
8. "She's Crazy for Leavin'" (Clark, Crowell) – 2:52
9. "Calf-Rope" – 2:35
10. "Lone Star Hotel" – 3:24

== Personnel ==
- Guy Clark – vocals, guitar
- Richard Bennett – guitar, concertina, triangle, lap steel guitar
- Rodney Crowell – guitar, background vocals
- Hank DeVito – guitar, pedal steel guitar
- Emory Gordy – guitar, bass, mandolin, piano
- Glen D. Hardin – keyboards
- Larrie Londin – drums, percussion
- Frank Reckard – guitar
- Ricky Skaggs – background vocals
- Rosanne Cash – background vocals
- Vince Gill – background vocals

== Production notes ==
- Rodney Crowell – producer
- Donivan Cowart – engineer
- Paul Brookside – liner notes

== Chart positions ==
Year	Chart	Position
1981	Billboard Country singles "The Partner Nobody Chose"	38
