= One Night Lonely (video) =

Video live by Mary Chapin Carpenter
- Released: July 12, 2021
- Recorded: November 27, 2020
- Venue: Filene Center at Wolf Trap National Park for the Performing Arts, Wolf Trap, Virginia, United States
- Genre: Country
- Length: 121:29
- Language: English
- Label: Lambent Light

Mary Chapin Carpenter chronology
The Dirt and the Stars (2020)	One Night Lonely (2021)	Looking for the Thread (2025)

One Night Lonely is a 2021 live video album from American country musician Mary Chapin Carpenter. It was recorded and released 25 years after her first live performance video, Jubilee: Live at Wolf Trap, also recorded at the same venue.

== Release and reception ==
The performance followed from a series of "Songs from Home" performances that Carpenter live streamed during the COVID-19 pandemic. Writing for The Arts Desk, Liz Thomson calls this culmination of that series "beautifully shot" and a "a stunning performance" that is "thoughtful, thought-provoking, consoling, and utterly involving". The recording was first made available for digital streaming on November 27, 2020, followed by compact disc and vinyl LP releases on December 4.

The album was nominated for Best Folk Album at the 64th Grammy Awards.

== Track listing ==
1. "The Age of Miracles" – 5:16
2. "Chasing What's Already Gone" – 4:48
3. "Farther Along and Further In" – 3:43
4. "Sometimes Just the Sky" – 5:13
5. "I Have a Need for Solitude" – 4:51
6. "Something Tamed, Something Wild" – 3:58
7. "Houston" – 5:20
8. "I Take My Chances" – 3:54
9. "Grand Central Station" – 4:15
10. "All Broken Hearts Break Differently" – 3:53
11. "This Shirt" – 4:58
12. "I Am a Town" – 5:03
13. "Stones in the Road" – 4:17
14. "Heroes and Heroines" – 4:11
15. "Old D-35" – 5:33
16. "This Is Love" – 5:10
17. "John Doe No. 24" – 6:16
18. "Don't Need Much to Be Happy" – 4:25
19. "He Thinks He'll Keep Her" – 3:54
20. "Why Shouldn't We" – 5:04
21. "Twilight" – 4:29
22. "Late for Your Life" – 4:24
23. "The Hard Way" – 4:15
24. "Between the Dirt and the Stars" – 4:32
25. "The Things That We Are Made Of" – 5:22
26. "Traveler's Prayer" – 4:43

== Personnel ==
- Mary Chapin Carpenter – acoustic guitar, vocals
- Matt Colton – mastering at Metropolis Studios
- Aaron Farrington – live event direction
- Mike Lane – technical direction
- Dominic Monks – mixing
- Fenton Williams – live event direction

== See also ==
- List of 2021 albums
