= Demetria Kalodimos =

American television news presenter

- Born: Morton Grove, Illinois, U.S.
- Education: B.S. in music, Illinois Wesleyan University; M.S. in journalism, University of Illinois at Urbana–Champaign
- Occupation: Television news anchor
- Spouse: Verlon Thompson

Demetria Kalodimos is a television news presenter based in Nashville, Tennessee. She was formerly an anchor for WSMV-TV, an NBC affiliate based in Nashville, Tennessee, where she appeared on weeknight broadcasts at 6 and 10 p.m.

== Biography ==
=== Life and education ===
Kalodimos grew up in Morton Grove, Illinois, a suburb of Chicago. She earned her bachelor's degree in music education from Illinois Wesleyan University, where she lived in Dodds Hall, in 1981. She later earned a master of science degree in journalism from the University of Illinois at Urbana–Champaign. In the early 1990s Kalodimos was part of a lawsuit involving a contractor she hired to build a home. The contractor eventually filed for bankruptcy. In the late 1990s she went through a well-publicized divorce and faced sensational allegations regarding her behavior.

=== Career ===
Kalodimos started her journalism career at WICD in Champaign, Illinois. She joined WSMV in Nashville in 1984. In 2000, she started Genuine Human Productions, a documentary film company focusing on people. Her first feature-length documentary was Pre-Madonna, a film about 1970s Nashville. The film won an award of excellence at the 2004 Berkeley Video and Film Festival.

Kalodimos's contract with WSMV expired on December 31, 2017, and was not renewed. She was the longest continuously serving evening news anchor ever at WSMV.

In October 2022, Kalodimos and fellow journalist Steve Cavendish resurrected the Nashville Banner as an online-based news journal. They partnered with WTVF (NewsChannel5), the CBS affiliate in Nashville, to share their content on air.

== Honors and awards ==
- 1995 - Investigative Reporters and Editors Award for television investigative journalism
- 2005 - Favorite Local News Anchor, Out and About Newspaper
- 2007 - Honorary doctor of humane letters from Illinois Wesleyan University
- 2007 - Investigative Reporters and Editors Award for television investigative journalism
- 2 National Headliner Awards
- 15 Emmy Awards
