= Homegrown Tomatoes =

Single by Guy Clark

from the album Better Days
- B-side: "Fold in a Mirror"
- Released: 1983
- Recorded: Folk, World, country
- Genre: Pop
- Length: 2:55
- Label: Warner
- Songwriter(s): Guy Clark
- Producer(s): Rodney Crowell

Guy Clark singles chronology
"The Partner Nobody Chose" (1981)	"Homegrown Tomatoes" (1983)

"Homegrown Tomatoes" is a song by Guy Clark, later included on his 1983 Better Days album. It is one of his best-known compositions.

The song reached #42 on the US Billboard Country chart during the late summer of 1983.

The song was covered by John Denver in 1988 on his LP Higher Ground. It was also later included on Clark's 1995 compilation albums, Craftsman and his 2007 Anthology LP.

== Chart history ==
Chart (1983)	Peak position
US Billboard Hot Country Singles	42
