= Old No. 1 =

Studio album by Guy Clark
- Released: November 1975
- Studios: RCA Studio B, Nashville, Tennessee
- Genres: Outlaw country, progressive country
- Length: 36:13
- Label: RCA
- Producer: Neil Wilburn

Guy Clark chronology
Old No. 1 (1975)	Texas Cookin' (1976)

Singles from Old No. 1
- 1. "Rita Ballou" Released: March 1976

Professional ratings
Review scores
Source	Rating
AllMusic	5/5 stars
Christgau's Record Guide	B+

Old No. 1 is the 1975 debut album by the Texan singer-songwriter Guy Clark.

The cover of the original LP featured a painting by Susanna Clark and liner notes by Jerry Jeff Walker. It was reissued on CD by Sugar Hill. Both Old No. 1 and Texas Cookin' were re-issued on CD on the Camden label in 2001.

== Track listing ==
All songs written by Guy Clark.

=== Side one ===
1. "Rita Ballou" – 2:49
2. "L.A. Freeway" – 4:43
3. "She Ain't Goin' Nowhere" – 3:27
4. "A Nickel for the Fiddler" – 2:45
5. "That Old Time Feeling" – 4:10

=== Side two ===
1. "Texas – 1947" – 3:10
2. "Desperados Waiting for a Train" – 4:31
3. "Like a Coat from the Cold" – 3:18
4. "Instant Coffee Blues" – 3:15
5. "Let Him Roll" – 4:05

== Personnel ==
- Guy Clark – vocals, guitar
- Mike Leech – bass
- Jerry Kroon – drums
- Larrie Londin – drums
- Chip Young – guitar
- Pat Carter – guitar, background vocals
- Steve Gibson – guitar
- Jerry Carrigan – drums
- Dick Feller – guitar
- Jim Colvard – guitar
- Reggie Young – guitar
- Hal Rugg – dobro, pedal steel
- Jack Hicks – dobro
- David Briggs – piano, background vocals
- Chuck Cochran – piano
- Shane Keister – piano
- Johnny Gimble – fiddle
- Mickey Raphael – harmonica
- Lea Jane Berinati – background vocals, piano
- Rodney Crowell – background vocals
- Emmylou Harris – background vocals
- Gary B. White – background vocals
- Florence Warner – background vocals
- Steve Earle – background vocals
- Sammi Smith – background vocals

== Production notes ==
- Neil Wilburn – producer, remixing
- Paul Brookside – liner notes
- Ray Butts – engineer
- Pat Carter – associate producer
- Susanna Clark – paintings
- Gary Hobish – reissue mastering
- Nathaniel Russell – reissue art director and design
- Filippo Salvadori – reissue producer

== Chart positions ==
Year	Chart	Position
1975	Billboard Country albums	41
