= Texas Cookin' =

Studio album by Guy Clark
- Released: 1976
- Recorded: American Sound Studios, Nashville, TN
- Genre: Country
- Length: 35:17
- Label: RCA
- Producer: Neil Wilburn

Guy Clark chronology
Old No. 1 (1975)	Texas Cookin' (1976)	Guy Clark (1978)

Professional ratings
Review scores
Source	Rating
Allmusic	4.5/5 stars

Texas Cookin' is the second studio album by Texas Outlaw country singer-songwriter Guy Clark, released in 1976.

It was reissued on CD by Sugar Hill. Both Old No. 1 and Texas Cookin' were re-issued on CD on the Camden label in 2001.

== Track listing ==
All songs written by Guy Clark except as noted.

1. "Texas Cookin'" – 3:50
2. "Anyhow, I Love You" – 3:55
3. "Virginia's Real" – 2:59
4. "It's About Time" – 4:57
5. "Good to Love You Lady" – 5:04
6. "Broken Hearted People" – 4:45
7. "Black Haired Boy" (Guy Clark, Susanna Clark) – 3:10
8. "Me I'm Feelin' the Same" – 3:32
9. "The Ballad of Laverne and Captain Flint" – 3:55
10. "The Last Gunfighter Ballad" – 2:51

== Personnel ==
- Guy Clark – vocals, guitar
- Mike Leach – bass
- Jerry Kroon – drums
- Larrie Londin – drums
- Chip Young – guitar
- Brian Ahern – guitar
- Lea Jane Berinati – keyboards, piano, background vocals
- David Briggs – clarinet, piano, keyboards, clavinet, background vocals
- Chuck Cochran – piano
- Charlie Bundy – bass, background vocals
- Susanna Clark – background vocals
- Sammi Smith – background vocals
- Hoyt Axton – background vocals
- Tracy Nelson – background vocals
- Nicolette Larson – background vocals
- Rodney Crowell – guitar, background vocals
- Johnny Gimble – fiddle
- Pete Grant – dobro, pedal steel guitar
- Emmylou Harris – background vocals
- Jack Hicks – banjo
- Chris Laird – drums, percussion, finger cymbals
- Mike Leech – bass, string arrangements
- Waylon Jennings – guitar, harmony vocals
- Steve Keith – fiddle
- Chips Moman – guitar
- Mickey Raphael – harmonica
- Danny Roland – guitar, background vocals
- Tommy Williams – fiddle
- Byron Bach – cello
- Jerry Jeff Walker – guitar, background vocals

== Production notes ==
- Neil Wilburn – producer
- Gary Hobish – reissue mastering
- Nathaniel Russell – reissue art director and design
- Filippo Salvadori – reissue producer

== Chart positions ==
Year	Chart	Position
1976	Billboard Country albums	48
