= Somedays the Song Writes You =

Studio album by Guy Clark
- Released: September 22, 2009
- Genre: Country
- Length: 39:05
- Label: Dualtone
- Producer: Guy Clark, Chris Latham, Verlon Thompson

Guy Clark chronology
The Platinum Collection (2008)	Somedays the Song Writes You (2009)	Songs and Stories (2011)

Professional ratings
Aggregate scores
Source	Rating
Metacritic	78/100
Review scores
Source	Rating
AllMusic	4/5 stars
The Austin Chronicle	3/5 stars
PopMatters	9/10 stars

Somedays the Song Writes You is the thirteenth studio album by American singer-songwriter Guy Clark. It was released on September 22, 2009, under Dualtone Records, and was nominated for Best Contemporary Folk Album at the 53rd Annual Grammy Awards.

== Track list ==
No.	Title	Writer(s)	Length
1.	"Somedays You Write the Song"	Guy Clark, Gary Nicholson, Jon Randall	3:39
2.	"The Guitar"	Clark, Verlon Thompson	4:03
3.	"Hemingway's Whiskey"	Clark, Joe Leathers, Ray Stephenson	2:54
4.	"The Coat"	Clark, Jedd Hughes, Ashley Monroe	3:23
5.	"All She Wants Is You"	Clark, Patrick Davis	3:49
6.	"If I Needed You"	Townes Van Zandt	4:45
7.	"Hollywood"	Clark, Hughes	3:19
8.	"Eamon"	Clark, Rodney Crowell	4:20
9.	"Wrong Side of the Tracks"	Clark, Davis	4:09
10.	"One Way Ticket Down"	Clark, Hughes, Monroe	3:11
11.	"Maybe I Can Paint Over That"	Clark, Thompson, Shawn Camp	4:10
Total length:			39:05

== Personnel ==
- Gina R. Binkley – design
- Shawn Camp – acoustic guitar, acoustic slide guitar, fiddle, mandolin, slide guitar, vocal harmony
- Guy Clark – acoustic guitar, producer, vocals
- Bryn Davies – upright bass, cello, vocal harmony
- Chris Latham – engineer, mastering, mixing, producer
- Kenny Malone – drums, percussion, vocals
- Verlon Thompson – acoustic guitar, harmonica, nylon string guitar, producer, vocal harmony

== Chart performance ==
Chart (2009)	Peak position
US Top Country Albums (Billboard)	59
US Heatseekers Albums (Billboard)	13
US Independent Albums (Billboard)	39
