= Ari Hest =

American musician (born 1979)

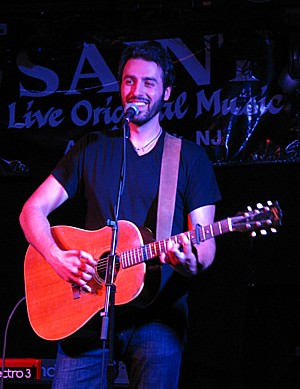
- Hest at The Saint in Asbury Park, New Jersey, May 11, 2011

Background information
- Born: June 16, 1979 (age 47); New York City, U.S.
- Genres: Rock; folk; pop
- Occupations: Singer-songwriter; musician
- Instruments: Guitar; keyboards; harmonica
- Years active: 1999–present
- Labels: Columbia; Project 4
- Website: arihest.com

Ari Hest (born June 16, 1979) is an American singer-songwriter from the Bronx borough of New York.

== Early life and education ==
Hest was born in New York on 16 June 1979. His father, Jeff Hest, plays the horn, used to wrote jingles and is a college music professor. His mother, Lisa Hest is a cantor. His older brother, Danny, was his manager for a time. Hest took piano lessons as a child, and later taught himself to play guitar. He also played baseball in high school.

Hest first attended Cornell University in Ithaca, New York, beginning in 1999 and later transferred to New York University, where he received a degree in communications in 2002.

== Career ==
Hest released an EP, Incomplete and two albums, Come Home and Story After Story all independently as he grew his fan base touring colleges and universities around the U.S.

In March 2004, Hest signed a recording contract with Columbia and recorded the album Someone To Tell and a five-song EP "Guilty Hearts EP" in the fall of 2005. His next EP was called The Green Room Sessions, a home spun recording entirely played and produced on his own. Shortly after releasing that, he worked with producer Mitchell Froom on "The Break-In", which was his last release on Columbia.

As an independent artist once again in 2008, Hest created 52, a subscription based service in which he wrote, recorded and released a new song every week for a year. In 2009, he released Twelve Mondays, a collection of 12 fan-selected songs from those 52, remixed.

Between 2011 and 2014, Hest released three more albums: Sunset Over Hope Street (2011), The Fire Plays (2012) and Shouts and Whispers (2014). Several songs from these albums have appeared in films and TV shows.

In 2016, Ari co-wrote a number of songs with Judy Collins, and the two released an album of duets June 3 entitled Silver Skies Blue, after two years of on-and-off touring together. The album earned Hest his first Grammy Award nomination (it was Collins' first nomination in 40 years). Silver Skies Blue was nominated for Best Folk Album at the 59th Annual Grammy Awards in 2017 but lost to Undercurrent by Sarah Jarosz. This is not Hest's first collaboration - he has two other projects: The Open Sea with Rosi Golan, and more recently, the Brazilian guitar inspired Bluebirds of Paradise with Chrissi Poland.

== Discography ==
- Come Home (2001)
- Story After Story (2002)
- Someone to Tell (2004)
- I've Got You (Download only single, 2007)
- The Break-In (2007)
- 52 (2008)
- Twelve Mondays (2009)
- Sunset Over Hope Street (2011)
- The Fire Plays (2012)
- Shouts and Whispers (2014)
- Silver Skies Blue with Judy Collins (2016)
- Natural (2017)
- Against The Sky (2020)
- The Treehouse Project - Year Three (2025)

=== Extended plays ===
- Incomplete (1999)
- Guilty Hearts (2005)
- The Green Room Sessions (2006)
- Live at the Quick Center (2008)

=== Soundtrack and other albums ===
- Consistency, Live from the Village Underground (2002), Project 4, included with first 1,000 copies of “Story After Story”
- Winter Break: The Movie Soundtrack (2003), Various Artists, with “Strangers Again” from Ari Hest
- DecentXposure: Volume One (2003). Various Artists, with "Consistency" from Ari Hest
- The Lincoln Lawyer soundtrack (2011) Various Artists, with "Now" from Ari Hest
- The Open Sea (with Rosi Golan), "Little Apple" EP (2010)

== Bibliography ==
- Condran, Ed. (Mar 18, 2005) "First Person Plural: Ari Hest Give his Band its Due on New CD". Jersey Alive! Asbury Park Press. Accessed January 5, 2006.
