= Old Friends (Guy Clark album) =

Studio album by Guy Clark
- Released: 1988
- Recorded: Nashville, TN
- Genre: Country
- Length: 28:12
- Label: Sugar Hill
- Producer: Miles Wilkinson

Guy Clark chronology
Guy Clark – Greatest Hits (1983)	Old Friends (1988)	Boats to Build (1992)

Old Friends is an album by the American musician Guy Clark, released in 1988 on Sugar Hill Records. Clark wrote or cowrote seven of the album's ten songs. Rosanne Cash and Emmylou Harris were among the backing vocalists. The album was recorded in Nashville, using an 8-track.

== Critical reception ==
Professional ratings
Review scores
Source	Rating
AllMusic	2.5/5 stars

The Sun-Sentinel wrote that "Clark's half-sung/half-spoken delivery, gentle finger-picking and the songs that are the stars." The Washington Post noted that "when he stops being portentous and settles for warm, Clark's still a fine songcrafter."

== Track listing ==
1. "Old Friends" (Guy Clark, Susanna Clark, Richard Dobson) – 3:12
2. "Hands" (Clark, Joe Henry, Verlon Thompson) – 2:22
3. "All Through Throwin' Good Love After Bad" (Clark, Richard Leigh) – 2:46
4. "Immigrant Eyes" (Clark, Jim Murragh) – 3:37
5. "Heavy Metal" (Clark, Jim McBride) – 3:02
6. "Come from the Heart" (Susanna Clark, Richard Leigh) – 3:18
7. "The Indian Cowboy" (Joe Ely) – 2:21
8. "To Live Is to Fly" (Townes Van Zandt) – 3:15
9. "Watermelon Dream" (Clark) – 3:23
10. "Doctor Good Doctor" (Clark) – 2:33

== Personnel ==
- Guy Clark – vocals, guitar
- Sam Bush – fiddle, mandolin, mandola
- Rosanne Cash – background vocals
- Rodney Crowell – background vocals
- Vince Gill – guitar
- Verlon Thompson – guitar, percussion, background vocals
- Emmylou Harris – background vocals
- Mike Henderson – guitar
- Dave Pomeroy – bass

Production

- Miles Wilkinson – producer, engineer
- Dan Purcell – mastering
