= Guy Clark =

American folk and country singer-songwriter (1941–2016)

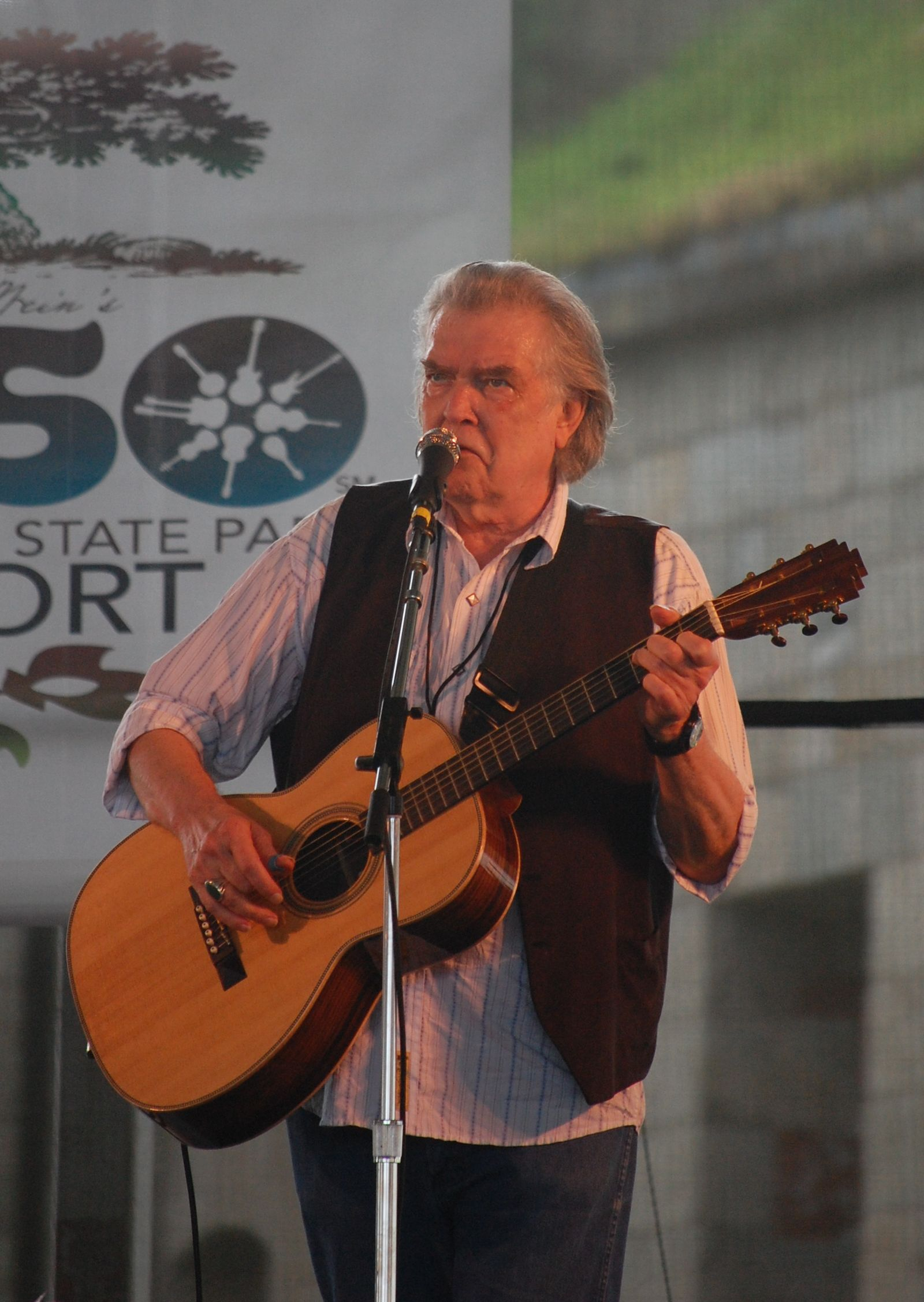
- Clark at the 2009 Newport Folk Festival

Background information
- Born: Guy Charles Clark; November 6, 1941; Monahans, Texas, U.S.
- Died: May 17, 2016 (aged 74) Nashville, Tennessee, U.S.
- Genres: Country; outlaw country; Texas country; folk
- Occupations: Musician, singer-songwriter, producer
- Instruments: Guitar, vocals
- Years active: 1970s–2016
- Labels: RCA, Warner, Sugar Hill, Elektra, Dualtone
- Website: guyclark.com

Guy Charles Clark (November 6, 1941 – May 17, 2016) was an American country singer-songwriter and luthier. He released more than 20 albums, and his songs have been recorded by other artists, including Townes Van Zandt, Bobby Bare, Jerry Jeff Walker, George Strait, Jimmy Buffett, Kathy Mattea, Lyle Lovett, Ricky Skaggs, Steve Wariner, Emmylou Harris, Rodney Crowell, Steve Earle, Johnny Cash, Willie Nelson, Nanci Griffith and Chris Stapleton. He won the 2014 Grammy Award for Best Folk Album: My Favorite Picture of You.

== Career ==
Clark was born in Monahans, Texas. His family moved to Rockport, Texas in 1954. After he graduated from high school in 1960, he spent almost a decade living in Houston as part of the folk music revival in that city. His wife Susanna Talley Clark and he eventually settled in Nashville, where he helped create the Americana genre. His songs "L.A. Freeway" and "Desperados Waiting for a Train" helped launch his career and were covered by numerous performers, including Steve Earle, Jerry Jeff Walker, Nanci Griffith, and Brian Jones. The New York Times described him in its obituary as "a king of the Texas troubadours", declaring his body of work "as indelible as that of anyone working in the Americana idiom in the last decades of the 20th century".

Clark had been a mentor to such other singers as Noel McKay, Steve Earle and Rodney Crowell. He organized Earle's first job as a writer in Nashville. In the 1970s, the Clarks' home in Nashville was an open house for songwriters and musicians, and it features in the film Heartworn Highways, an evocation of the songwriter scene in Nashville at that time.

Numerous artists have charted with Clark-penned tunes. "The Last Gunfighter Ballad" was the title song of Johnny Cash's 1977 studio album. In 1982, Bobby Bare made it to the Country Top 20 with Clark's "New Cut Road". That same year, bluegrass leader Ricky Skaggs hit number one with Clark's "Heartbroke", a song that permanently established his reputation as an ingenious songwriter. Among the many others who have covered Clark's songs are Vince Gill, who took "Oklahoma Borderline" to the Top 10 in 1985; The Highwaymen, who introduced "Desperados Waiting for a Train" to a new generation that same year; John Conlee, whose interpretation of "The Carpenter" rode into the Top 10 in 1987; and John Denver, who recorded Clark's "Homegrown Tomatoes" in 1988. Clark is frequently referred to as the Fifth Highwayman.

Steve Wariner recorded "Baby I’m Yours", a song he co-wrote with Guy Clark, which became a major country hit in 1988; Asleep at the Wheel charted with Clark's "Blowin' Like a Bandit" the same year. Crowell was Clark's co-writer on "She's Crazy for Leavin'", which in 1989 became the third of five straight number-one hits for Crowell. Brad Paisley and Alan Jackson covered Clark's "Out in the Parkin' Lot", co-written with Darrell Scott, on Paisley's Time Well Wasted CD. Jimmy Buffett, obviously influenced by Jerry Jeff Walker's earlier quality cover of "Boats to Build" on 1997's "Cowboy Boots & Bathin Suits", then covered Clark's "Boats to Build" and "Cinco de Mayo in Memphis". Clark credits Townes Van Zandt as being a major influence on his songwriting. One of the most famous photos in country music history was taken on Clark's porch in 1972 of Clark, wife Susanna, Van Zandt, and Daniel Antopolsky by photographer Al Clayton. Clark and Van Zandt were best friends for many years until Van Zandt's death in 1997, and Clark has included a Van Zandt composition on most of his albums. In 1995, he recorded a live album with Van Zandt and Steve Earle, Together at the Bluebird Cafe, which was released in October 2001. Other live material can be found on his album Keepers. Earle released the tribute album Guy in 2019.

In 2006, Clark released Workbench Songs. The album was nominated for Best Contemporary Folk/Americana Album at the Grammy Awards. He also toured with Lyle Lovett, Joe Ely, and John Hiatt in 2004, 2005, and 2007. In May 2008, Clark canceled four concerts after breaking his leg. After two months on crutches, he began to perform again on July 4 at the Smithsonian Folklife Festival in Washington, DC, where he appeared with Verlon Thompson. On June 20, 2009, Clark announced a new album titled Somedays the Song Writes You, which was released on September 22, 2009. It features originals along with a Townes Van Zandt song titled "If I Needed You".

In December 2011, This One's for Him: A Tribute to Guy Clark (a two-CD set) was released by Icehouse Music and produced by longtime fan Tamara Saviano. The CD won Americana Album of the Year at the 2012 Americana Music Honors & Awards. Clark won the Grammy Award for Best Folk Album in 2014 for My Favorite Picture of You.

The final song that Clark completed was co-written with Angaleena Presley and titled "Cheer Up Little Darling". It appeared on Presley's 2017 album Wrangled.

Texas country singer/songwriter Aaron Watson paid tribute to Clark in his song entitled "Ghost of Guy Clark", released in June 2019. In the song, Clark's ghost asks the protagonist to perform a song and is unimpressed; he then encourages the performer to write songs with greater passion.

Gillian Welch and David Rawlings' song "Hashtag", from their 2024 album Woodland, is a tribute to Clark and refers to the moment Welch found out about his death on social media, when his name was accompanied by a hashtag.

== Personal life ==
Clark had one son, Travis Carroll Clark (December 18, 1966 - October 12, 2017; aortic aneurysm), from his first marriage to folksinger Susan Spaw. He was married to songwriter and artist Susanna Clark from 1972 until her death from cancer on June 27, 2012.

On May 17, 2016, Clark died in Nashville following a lengthy battle with lymphoma at the age of 74.

== Discography ==
=== Studio albums ===
Year	Album	Peak chart positions					Label
Year	Album	US Country	US	US Heat	US Indie	US Folk	Label
1975	Old No. 1	41					RCA
1976	Texas Cookin'	48					RCA
1978	Guy Clark						Warner
1981	The South Coast of Texas						Warner
1983	Better Days	48					Warner
1988	Old Friends						Sugar Hill
1992	Boats to Build						Asylum
1995	Dublin Blues						Asylum
1999	Cold Dog Soup						Sugar Hill
2002	The Dark	46					Sugar Hill
2006	Workbench Songs	74		36			Dualtone
2009	Somedays the Song Writes You	59		13	39		Dualtone
2013	My Favorite Picture of You	12	62		14	5	Dualtone

=== Compilations and live albums ===
Year	Album	Label
1979	On The Road Live [live, promo]	Warner
1982	Best of Guy Clark	RCA
1983	Guy Clark – Greatest Hits	RCA
1995	Craftsman	Rounder/Philo
1997	Keepers [live]	Sugar Hill
1997	The Essential Guy Clark	RCA
2001	Together at the Bluebird Cafe [live] (with Townes Van Zandt and Steve Earle)	American Originals
2007	Americana Master Series: Best of the Sugar Hill Years	Sugar Hill
2007	Live from Austin, TX	New West
2007	Hindsight 21-20: Anthology 1975-1995	Raven
2008	The Platinum Collection	Warner
2011	Songs and Stories	Dualtone
2017	Guy Clark: The Best of Dualtone Years	Dualtone

=== Singles ===
Year	Single	US Country	Album
1979	"Fools for Each Other"	96	Guy Clark
1981	"The Partner Nobody Chose"	38	The South Coast of Texas
1983	"Homegrown Tomatoes"	42	Better Days

== Filmography ==
- Heartworn Highways - Documentary, Snapper/Catfish, 1981/2003, with Townes Van Zandt, David Allan Coe, and Steve Earle
- Be Here to Love Me - Documentary, Rake Films, 2004
- Heartworn Highways Revisited 2015
- Without Getting Killed or Caught - Documentary, Slow Uvalde Films, 2020

Awards
Preceded by Cowboy Jack Clement	AMA Lifetime Achievement Award for Songwriting; 2005	Succeeded by Rodney Crowell
