= Keepers (Guy Clark album) =

Live album by Guy Clark
- Released: 1997
- Recorded: October 31 – November 2, 1996, Douglas Corner in Nashville, Tennessee
- Genre: Country
- Length: 64:45
- Label: Sugar Hill
- Producer: Miles Wilkinson, Guy Clark

Guy Clark chronology
Craftsman (1995)	Keepers (1997)	The Essential Guy Clark (1997)

Professional ratings
Review scores
Source	Rating
Allmusic	4/5 stars
Country Standard Time	(favorable)

Keepers is a live album by American singer-songwriter Guy Clark, released in 1997.

Clark's first live album, Allmusic stated in its review "...it's a better greatest-hits record than any available, since all the songs come from one source, and it's a fine example of how live records should be made."

== Track listing ==
All songs by Guy Clark unless otherwise noted.

1. "L.A. Freeway" – 5:54
2. "Texas, 1947" – 3:33
3. "Like a Coat from the Cold" – 3:17
4. "Heartbroke" – 3:45
5. "The Last Gunfighter Ballad" – 3:07
6. "Better Days" – 3:03
7. "Homegrown Tomatoes" – 4:35
8. "She Ain't Goin' Nowhere" – 3:38
9. "South Coast of Texas" – 4:20
10. "That Old Time Feeling" – 4:17
11. "A Little of Both" (Clark, Verlon Thompson) – 4:31
12. "Out in the Parking Lot" (Clark, Darrell Scott) – 4:35
13. "Let Him Roll" – 4:51
14. "Texas Cookin'" – 6:00
15. "Desperados Waiting for a Train" – 5:19

== Personnel ==
- Guy Clark – vocals, guitar
- Travis Clark – bass, background vocals
- Kenny Malone – drums, percussion
- Suzi Ragsdale – accordion, background vocals
- Darrell Scott – guitar, dobro, mandolin, dulcimer, slide guitar
- Verlon Thompson – guitar, background vocals

== Production notes ==
- Miles Wilkinson – producer, engineer, mixing
- Johnny Rosen – assistant engineer
- Carlos Grier – digital editing
- Denny Purcell – mastering
- Michael McCall – liner notes
- Senor McGuire – photography
- Lynne Cook – photography
- Sue Meyer – design
