= Guy Clark – Greatest Hits =

Greatest hits album by Guy Clark
- Released: 1983
- Recorded: Nashville, TN
- Genre: Country
- Label: RCA

Guy Clark chronology
Better Days (1983)	Guy Clark – Greatest Hits (1983)	Old Friends (1988)

Guy Clark – Greatest Hits is a compilation album by Texas singer-songwriter Guy Clark.

== Track listing ==
All songs written by Guy Clark except where noted.

1. "Texas Cookin'" – 3:50
2. "Desperados Waiting for the Train" – 4:31
3. "L.A. Freeway" – 4:43
4. "She Ain't Goin' Nowhere" – 3:27
5. "A Nickel for the Fiddler" – 2:45
6. "Broken Hearted People" – 4:45
7. "Texas – 1947" – 3:10
8. "Let Him Roll" – 4:05
9. "The Last Gunfighter Ballad" – 2:51
10. "Rita Ballou" – 2:49

== Personnel ==
- Guy Clark – vocals, guitar
- Mike Leach – bass
- Jerry Kroon – drums
- Larrie Londin – drums
- Chip Young – guitar
- Pat Carter – guitar
- Steve Gibson – guitar
- Jerry Carrigan – drums
- Dick Feller – guitar
- Jim Colvard – guitar
- Reggie Young – guitar
- Hal Rugg – dobro
- Jack Hicks – dobro
- Hal Rugg – pedal steel guitar
- Chuck Cochran – piano
- Shane Keister – piano
- Johnny Gimble – fiddle
- Mickey Raphael – harmonic
- Lea Jane Berinati – background vocals, piano
- Rodney Crowell – background vocals
- Emmylou Harris – background vocals
- Pat Carter – background vocals
- Gary B. White – background vocals
- Florence Warner – background vocals
- Steve Earle – background vocals
- Sammi Smith – background vocals
- Brian Ahern – guitar
- David Briggs – clarinet, piano, keyboards, clavinet, background vocals
- Chuck Cochran – piano
- Charlie Bundy – bass, background vocals
- Susanna Clark – background vocals
- Sammi Smith – background vocals
- Hoyt Axton – background vocals
- Tracy Nelson – background vocals
- Nicolette Larson – background vocals
- Pete Grant – dobro, pedal steel guitar
- Jack Hicks – banjo
- Chris Laird – drums, percussion, finger cymbals
- Mike Leech – bass, string arrangements
- Waylon Jennings – guitar, harmony vocals
- Steve Keith – fiddle
- Chips Moman – guitar
- Danny Roland – guitar, background vocals
- Tommy Williams – fiddle
- Byron Bach – cello
- Jerry Jeff Walker – guitar, background vocals
