= Cold Dog Soup (album) =

Studio album by Guy Clark
- Released: October 26, 1999
- Genre: Country
- Length: 40:06
- Label: Sugar Hill
- Producer: Guy Clark, Verlon Thompson, Chris Latham, Darrell Scott

Guy Clark chronology
The Essential Guy Clark (1997)	Cold Dog Soup (1999)	The Dark (2002)

Professional ratings
Review scores
Source	Rating
AllMusic	4/5 stars
The Encyclopedia of Popular Music	4/5 stars

Cold Dog Soup is an album by the American singer-songwriter Guy Clark, released in 1999.

== Production ==
The album was recorded in Nashville, with Clark's touring musicians; Emmylou Harris added vocal overdubs.

== Critical reception ==
AllMusic wrote that "the tragedy 'Water Under the Bridge' feels a lot like the folk-blues of Bob Dylan's 'Ballad of Hollis Brown', and in its own way is just as harrowing, with the mandolin fills floating around the guitar lines." No Depression thought that "the title track paints a scene at a Los Angeles bar where Clark, Townes Van Zandt and Tom Waits played gigs in the late ’60s—a delicately surreal portrait of literary ferment a la 1920s Paris or Secessionist Vienna set in Mission Beach." The Chicago Tribune stated that "the album features finely detailed story songs such as 'Sis Draper', about an Arkansas fiddler, and 'Red River', which details the Clarks' ancestors move from Kentucky to West Texas."

== Track listing ==
1. "Cold Dog Soup" (Guy Clark, Mark Sanders) – 3:32
2. "Fort Worth Blues" (Steve Earle) – 4:31
3. "Sis Draper" (Shawn Camp, Clark) – 3:41
4. "Ain't No Trouble to Me" (Clark, Jon Stewart) – 2:58
5. "Water Under the Bridge" (Clark) – 3:10
6. "Forever, for Always, for Certain" (Richard Dobson) – 3:14
7. "Men Will Be Boys" (Clark, Verlon Thompson) – 3:27
8. "Indian Head Penny" (Clark, Verlon Thompson) – 3:29
9. "Bunkhouse Blues" (Clark, Verlon Thompson) – 3:05
10. "Red River" (Clark) – 3:02
11. "Die Tryin'" (Clark, Jon Stewart) – 2:46
12. "Be Gone Forever" (Anna McGarrigle, Keith Sykes) – 3:11

== Personnel ==
- Guy Clark – vocals, guitar
- Shawn Camp – guitar, fiddle, harmony vocals
- Emmylou Harris – harmony vocals
- Darrell Scott – guitar, mandolin, accordion, autoharp, bass, harmony vocals, mandocello
- Verlon Thompson – guitar, banjo, harmonica, harmony vocals

== Production notes ==
- Verlon Thompson – producer
- Darrell Scott - producer
- J.D. Andrew – mixing
- Chris Latham – producer, engineer, mixing
- Randy LeRoy – mastering
- Senor McGuire – photography
- Sue Meyer – design
