= Silver Skies Blue =

Studio album by Judy Collins and Ari Hest
- Released: June 3, 2016
- Genre: Folk, Americana, Contemporary Folk
- Length: 45:11
- Label: Cleopatra

Judy Collins chronology
Strangers Again (2015)	Silver Skies Blue (2016)	A Love Letter To Sondheim (2017)

Ari Hest chronology
Shouts and Whispers (2014)	Silver Skies Blue (2016)	Natural (2017)

Silver Skies Blue is an album by Judy Collins and Ari Hest. It earned them a Grammy Award nomination for Best Folk Album, Hest's first and Collins' first nomination in 40 years. Of the album's 12 tracks, 8 were co-written by Collins and Hest.

Collins and Hest met backstage at a show, and Hest sang on one song on her 2014 Live In Ireland album, prior to collaborating on Silver Skies Blue.

== Track listing ==
No.	Title	Writer(s)	Length
1.	"Drifting Away"	Judy Collins, Ari Hest	3:19
2.	"I Choose Love"	Collins, Hest	3:01
3.	"Silver Skies Blue"	Collins, Hest	3:06
4.	"The Weight"	Hest	3:16
5.	"Slow Burns"	Collins, Hest	3:17
6.	"Let You In"	Collins, Hest	3:57
7.	"Run"	Collins, Hest	4:15
8.	"Aberdeen"	Hest	4:38
9.	"Elena"	Collins, Hest	3:33
10.	"Secret Harbor"	Collins, Hest, Russel Walden	4:33
11.	"Home Before Dark"	David Buskin, Collins, Dwight W. Batteau Jr.	3:35
12.	"Strangers Again"	Marvin Etzioni, Hest	4:41
Total length:			45:11
