= Better Days (Guy Clark album) =

Album by Guy Clark

Studio album by Guy Clark
- Released: 1983
- Recorded: Nashville, TN
- Genre: Country
- Label: Warner Bros.
- Producer: Rodney Crowell

Guy Clark chronology
Best of Guy Clark (1982)	Better Days (1983)	Guy Clark – Greatest Hits (1983)

Professional ratings
Review scores
Source	Rating
Allmusic	link

Better Days is the fifth studio album by Texas singer-songwriter Guy Clark, released in 1983.

The LP contains one hit single, "Homegrown Tomatoes," which reached No. 42 on the U.S. Billboard Country chart. The song was covered by John Denver in 1988 on his LP Higher Ground.

== Track listing ==
All songs written by Guy Clark except as noted.

1. "Blowin' Like a Bandit" – 2:40
2. "Better Days" – 3:05
3. "Homegrown Tomatoes" – 2:58
4. "Supply & Demand" – 3:16
5. "The Randall Knife" – 4:13
6. "The Carpenter" – 3:08
7. "Uncertain Texas" (Guy Clark, Rodney Crowell) – 2:29
8. "No Deal" (Townes Van Zandt) – 3:19
9. "Tears" – 2:49
10. "Fool in the Mirror" – 3:35

== Personnel ==
- Guy Clark – vocals, guitar
- Glen D. Hardin – keyboards
- Tony Brown – keyboards
- Rodney Crowell – background vocals
- Paul Kennerley – bass, background vocals
- Hank DeVito – guitar, pedal steel guitar
- Vince Gill – guitar, background vocals
- Johnny Gimble – fiddle, mandolin
- Emory Gordy – guitar, bass
- Larrie Londin – drums
- Gary Nicholson – guitar
- Reggie Young – guitar

== Production notes ==
- Rodney Crowell – producer
- Bradley Hartman – engineer
- Tim Farmer – assistant engineer
- Glenn Meadows – original mastering
- Danny Mundhenk – assistant engineer
- Paul Brookside – liner notes

== Chart performance ==
Chart (1983)	Peak position
U.S. Billboard Top Country Albums	48
