= Tamara Saviano =

American country music producer and author

Tamara Saviano is an American country music producer and author. She co-produced the Grammy-winning Beautiful Dreamer: The Songs of Stephen Foster, the Grammy-nominated and Americana Award-winning album This One's For Him: A Tribute to Guy Clark, The Pilgrim: A Celebration of Kris Kristofferson, Looking Into You: A Tribute to Jackson Browne and Red Hot: A Memphis Celebration of Sun Records. Saviano also co-produced, with Shawn Camp, Kris Kristofferson's The Cedar Creek Sessions which was nominated for a Grammy in 2016.

As an author, Saviano wrote the memoir The Most Beautiful Girl: A True Story of a Dad, a Daughter and the Healing Power of Music published by American Roots Media in 2014. She is the author of Without Getting Killed or Caught: The Life and Music of Guy Clark, published by Texas A&M University in 2016. She worked on the book for eight years, which was completed shortly after Clark's death. The book won the Belmont Book award in 2017 for the best writing on country music.
