= Verlon Thompson =

- Born: January 5, 1954 (age 72); Binger, Oklahoma
- Genres: Folk music, Americana music
- Occupation: Musician
- Instruments: Guitar, vocals
- Years active: 1981–present
- Label: VNS Records
- Formerly of: Restless Heart
- Website: verlonthompson.com

Verlon Thompson is an American singer, songwriter, guitarist, and troubadour from Binger, Oklahoma. He had long partnered with Guy Clark as a producer, guitarist, and song co-writer.

== Biography ==
Thompson has released a compilation CD called Works.

Thompson's original songs have been covered by many notable musicians, including:

- Randy Travis - Don't Take Your Love Away From Me
- Kenny Rogers - If I Were You
- Barbara Mandrell - You Know What I'm Not Talking About
- The Nitty Gritty Dirt Band - Dancing to the Beat of a Broken Heart
- Sam Bush - The Ballad of Stringbean and Estelle (IBMA Song of the Year Nominee)
- Trisha Yearwood - You Say You Will
- Jimmy Buffett and Alan Jackson - Boats to Build
- Suzy Bogguss - Cross My Broken Heart (Top 20 Billboard chart), No Good Way to Go
- Anne Murray - I Know Too Much, Overboard
- Del McCoury Band - Backslidin' Blues
- Keith Whitley - Lucky Dog
- Dierks Bentley, Jamey Johnson, and Miranda Lambert - Bad Angel (Grammy nominee for vocal collaboration)
- Guy Clark - The Guitar (Grammy nominated as co-producer)
- Tracy Byrd - The First Step (BMI Million Airplay Award)
- T. Graham Brown - Moonshadow Road (Top 20 Billboard Charts)
- The McCarters - Up and Gone (Top 10 Billboard Charts)

In addition, Thompson has recorded guitar parts for Restless Heart, Pam Tillis, and Guy Clark, among others. Thompson was the original lead vocalist of Restless Heart, but was replaced by Larry Stewart before the band released any singles.

Thompson is married to broadcaster Demetria Kalodimos. Together, they created the television series Barnegie Hall in 2017.

== Discography ==
=== Solo recordings ===
- 1990: Verlon Thompson (Capitol Nashville)
- 2009: Live at the Ivey's (Victor Tango Records)
- 2011: Works (Victor Tango Records)

=== With Guy Clark ===
- 1992: Boats to Build (Asylum)
- 1993: Old Friends (Sugar Hill)
- 1995: Dublin Blues (Elektra)
- 1997: Keepers (Sugar Hill)
- 1999: Cold Dog Soup (Sugar Hill)
- 2002: The Dark (Sugar Hill)
- 2009: Somedays the Song Writes You (Dualtone)
- 2011: Songs and Stories (Dualtone)
- 2013: My Favorite Picture of You (Dualtone)

=== Suzi Ragsdale and Verlon Thompson ===
- 1993: Anything Goes (VNS Records)
- 1995: Out of Our Hands (VNS Records)

=== Sue Cunningham and Verlon Thompson ===
- 2014: Find Your Angel (CD Baby)

=== As composer ===
- 1987: Nitty Gritty Dirt Band - "Hold On" (Warner Bros.) - track 7, "Dancing to the Beat of a Broken Heart", co-written with Wayland Holyfield.
- 1988: Randy Travis - Old 8x10 (Warner Bros.) - track 7, "The Blues in Black and White" (co-written with Wayland Holyfield)
- 1989: Suzy Bogguss - Somewhere Between (Capitol) - track 3, "I'm at Home on the Range" (co-written with Suzy Bogguss and Doug Crider); track 7, "Cross My Broken Heart" (co-written with Kye Fleming)
- 1989: Randy Travis - No Holdin' Back (Warner Bros. Nashville) - track 10, "Have a Nice Rest of Your Life" (co-written with Mark D. Sanders)
- 1991: Billy Dean - Billy Dean (Liberty) - track 8, "Gone but Not Forgotten" (co-written with Wayland Holyfield)
- 1991: The Oak Ridge Boys - Unstoppable (RCA) - track 5, "If I Were You" (co-written with Billy Dean)
- 1991: Ronna Reeves - Only the Heart (Mercury) - track 3, "Ain't No Future In The Past" (co-written with Wayland Holyfield)
- 1992: Holly Dunn - Getting It Dunn (Warner Bros.) - track 4, "You Say You Will" (co-written with Beth Nielsen Chapman)
- 1992: Trisha Yearwood - Hearts in Armor (MCA) - track 3, "You Say You Will" (co-written with Beth Nielsen Chapman)
- 1993: Suzy Bogguss - Something Up My Sleeve (Liberty) - track 10, "Something Up My Sleeve" (co-written with Suzi Ragsdale)
- 1993: Bobbie Cryner - Bobbie Cryner (Epic) - track 1, "He Feels Guilty" (co-written with Tommy Polk)
- 1993: Billy Dean - Fire in the Dark (Liberty) - track 3, "That's What I Like About Love" (co-written with Mark Sanders)
- 1993: Beth Nielsen Chapman - You Hold the Key (Reprise) - track 9, "You Say You Will" (co-written with Beth Nielsen Chapman)
- 1993: Kenny Rogers - If Only My Heart Had a Voice (Giant) - track 5, "If I Were You" (co-written with Billy Dean)
- 1994: Joe Diffie - Third Rock from the Sun (Epic) - track 10, "Good Brown Gravy" (co-written with Billy Dean and Bill Kenner)
- 1994: Lari White - Wishes (RCA) - track 5, "If I'm Not Already Crazy" (co-written with Suzi Ragsdale)
- 1996: Randy Travis - Full Circle (Warner Bros.) - track 6, "Don't Take Your Love Away from Me" (co-written with Mark D. Sanders)
- 1998: Pam Tillis - Every Time (Arista Nashville) - track 10, "After Hours" (co-written with Suzi Ragsdale)
- 2000: Chad Brock - Yes! (Warner Bros.) - track 10, "If I Were You" (co-written with Billy Dean)
- 2001: Suzy Bogguss - Live at Caffe Milano - track 6, "Cross My Broken Heart" (co-written with Kye Fleming)
- 2003: Del McCoury Band - It's Just the Night (McCoury Music) - track 2, "Asheville Turnaround" (co-written with Austin Cunningham)
- 2004: Jimmy Buffett - License to Chill (Mailboat / RCA) - track 2, "Boats to Build" (co-written with Guy Clark)
- 2007: Suzy Bogguss - Sweet Danger (Loyal Dutchess) - track 3, "No Good Way to Go"
- 2010: Dierks Bentley - Up on the Ridge (Capitol Records Nashville) - track 6, "Bad Angel" (co-written with Suzi Ragsdale)

=== Also appears on ===
- 1985: Restless Heart - Restless Heart (RCA)
- 1989: Hugh Moffatt - Troubadour (Philo)
- 1994: Pat Alger - Notes and Grace Notes (Liberty)
- 1994: David Ball - Thinkin' Problem (Rhino / Warner Bros.)
- 1994: Tom Paxton - Wearing the Time (Sugar Hill)
- 1994: Randy Travis - This Is Me (Warner Bros.)
- 1994: Ian Tyson - Eighteen Inches of Rain (Vanguard)
- 1995: Stacy Dean Campbell - Hurt City (Columbia)
- 1995: Pam Tillis - All of This Love (Arista Nashville)
- 1997: Darrell Scott - Aloha from Nashville (Sugar Hill)
- 1997: Joy Lynn White - Lucky Few (Little Dog / Mercury)
- 1999: Darrell Scott - Family Tree (Sugar Hill)
- 2000: Clay Greenberg - Tumbleweed (Home Grown)
- 2000: Jelly Roll Johnson - And a Few Close Friends (American Originals)
- 2005: Wayne Scott - This Weary Way (Full Light)
- 2010: Matt King - Hard Country (Atlantic)
- 2010: Watermelon Slim - Ringers (NorthernBlues)
