= Mary Chapin Carpenter discography =

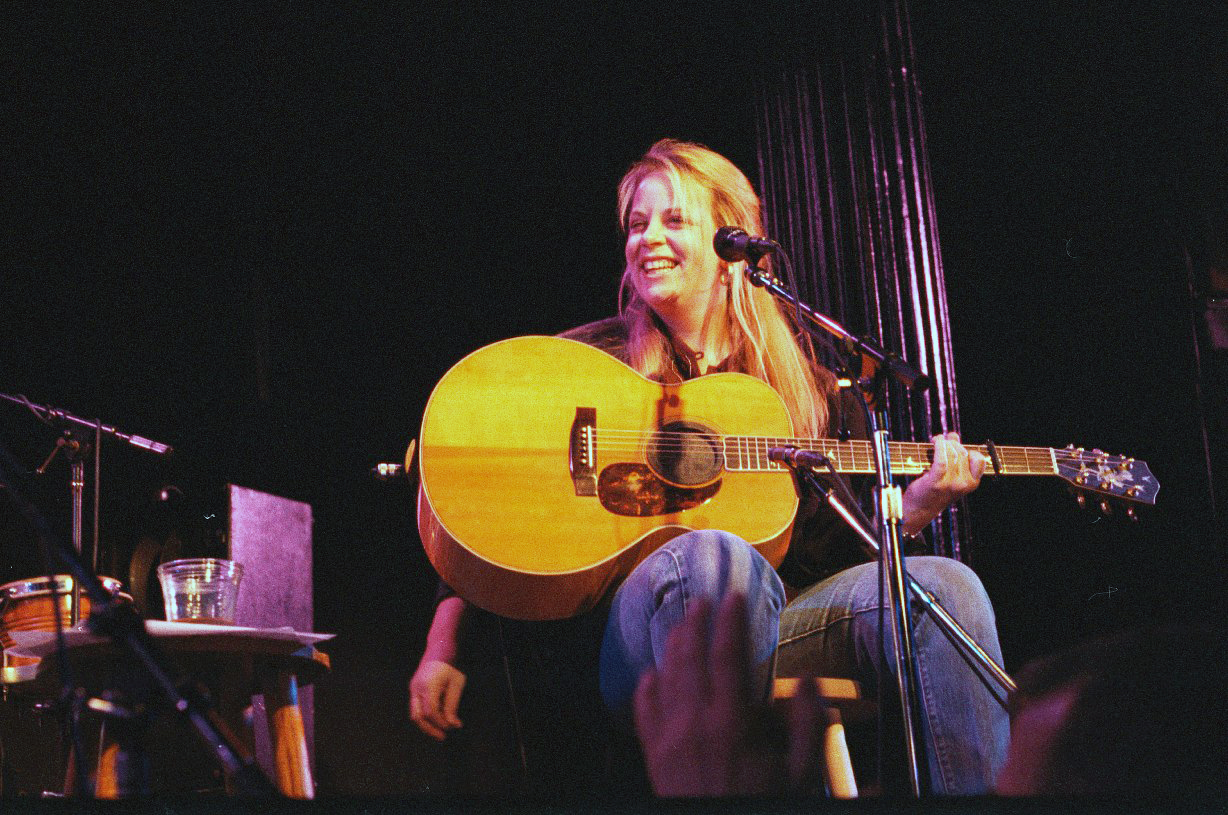
- Carpenter performing in New York City, October 2006
- Studio albums: 17
- Live albums: 2
- Compilation albums: 4
- Singles: 41
- Video albums: 3
- Music videos: 15
- Other appearances: 88

The discography of American singer-songwriter Mary Chapin Carpenter consists of 17 studio albums, four compilation albums, three video albums, 41 singles, 15 music videos, and 88 album appearances. After recording a demo tape, she was signed to Columbia Records in 1987 and released her debut studio album Hometown Girl (1987). In June 1989, Carpenter's second studio album State of the Heart was issued, which transitioned more towards country music. Among its four singles, both "Never Had It So Good" and "Quittin' Time" became top 10 hits on the Billboard Hot Country Singles and Tracks chart.

Carpenter entered the 1990s with her third album, Shooting Straight in the Dark, which was released in October 1990 and certified platinum in sales by the Recording Industry Association of America. Its third single "Down at the Twist and Shout" won the Grammy Award for Best Female Country Vocal Performance in 1992 and became a top 10 hit. In June 1992, Carpenter released Come On Come On, which became her best-selling record. From seven singles issued, the songs "I Feel Lucky", "Passionate Kisses", and "He Thinks He'll Keep Her" became top 10 hits on the Billboard country chart. Her fifth album Stones in the Road (1994) debuted at No. 1 on the Top Country Albums chart and No. 10 on the Billboard 200. Its lead single "Shut Up and Kiss Me" topped the Billboard country chart in 1994. Her sixth studio release entitled A Place in the World (1996) certified gold in sales in the United States. Party Doll and Other Favorites (1998) was Carpenter's first compilation album, also certifying gold in sales from the RIAA.

Carpenter entered the 2000s with her seventh studio album Time* Sex* Love* (2001), debuting at No. 6 on the Billboard Top Country Albums chart. The release was nominated by the Grammy Awards in 2002 for Best-Engineered Album. Her second compilation album, The Essential Mary Chapin Carpenter, was released in 2003. Her eighth studio album, Between Here and Gone was released in 2004. The record was co-produced by Carpenter and pianist Matt Rollings. She returned in 2007 with her ninth studio album The Calling on Zoë Records. The project debuted at No. 10 on the Billboard Top Country Albums chart and sold 100,000 copies within its first few weeks. Carpenter's first holiday album, Come Darkness, Come Light: Twelve Songs of Christmas, was released in 2008.

Carpenter entered the 2010s with her 11th studio album, The Age of Miracles, released in April 2010. Among other entries, The Age or Miracles debuted within the top 10 of the Billboard Top Rock Albums chart. She followed with her 13th studio album Ashes and Roses (2012). Carpenter then collaborated with arranger Vince Mendoza to issue Songs from the Movie (2014), an album of orchestral music. In May 2016, The Things That We Are Made Of marked a return to traditional roots music and debuted at No. 8 on the Top Country Albums chart. Carpenter's 15th studio album Sometimes Just the Sky (2018) contained new versions of previously recorded material and debuted at No. 13 on the Billboard folk albums chart. Carpenter's 16th studio album, The Dirt and the Stars, was released in 2020. Her 17th, Personal History, was released in 2025.

== Albums ==
=== Studio albums ===
List of albums, with selected chart positions and certifications, showing other relevant details
Title	Album details	Peak chart positions							Certifications
Title	Album details	US	US Country	US Folk	AUS	CAN	CAN Country	UK	Certifications
Hometown Girl	Released: July 30, 1987; Label: Columbia; Formats: Vinyl, cassette, CD	—	—	—	178	—	—	—	
State of the Heart	Released: June 13, 1989; Label: Columbia; Formats: Vinyl, cassette, CD	183	28	—	—	—	—	—	RIAA: Gold
Shooting Straight in the Dark	Released: October 9, 1990; Label: Columbia; Formats: Cassette, CD	70	11	—	111	—	—	—	MC: Gold; RIAA: Platinum
Come On Come On	Released: June 30, 1992; Label: Columbia; Formats: Cassette, CD	31	6	—	162	—	4	—	BPI: Silver; MC: 2× Platinum; RIAA: 4× Platinum
Stones in the Road	Released: October 4, 1994; Label: Columbia; Formats: Cassette, CD	10	1	—	81	29	1	26	BPI: Silver; MC: Platinum; RIAA: 2× Platinum
A Place in the World	Released: October 22, 1996; Label: Columbia; Formats: Cassette, CD	20	3	—	121	—	13	36	MC: Gold; RIAA: Gold
Time* Sex* Love*	Released: May 29, 2001; Label: Columbia; Formats: Cassette, CD	52	6	—	164	—	—	57	
Between Here and Gone	Released: April 27, 2004; Label: Columbia; Formats: CD, music download	50	5	—	—	—	—	92	
The Calling	Released: March 6, 2007; Label: Zoë; Formats: CD, music download	59	10	—	—	—	—	95	
Come Darkness, Come Light: Twelve Songs of Christmas	Released: September 30, 2008; Label: Zoë; Formats: CD, music download	155	30	—	—	—	—	—	
The Age of Miracles	Released: April 27, 2010; Label: Zoë; Formats: CD, music download	28	6	1	—	—	—	101	
Ashes and Roses	Released: June 12, 2012; Label: Zoë; Formats: CD, music download	72	16	7	—	—	—	26	
Songs from the Movie	Released: January 14, 2014; Label: Zoë; Formats: CD, music download	75	—	6	—	—	—	95	
The Things That We Are Made Of	Released: May 6, 2016; Label: Lambent Light Records; Formats: CD, music download, vinyl	102	8	3	—	—	—	47	
Sometimes Just the Sky	Released: March 30, 2018; Label: Lambent Light Records; Formats: CD, music download	—	29	13	—	—	—	74	
The Dirt and the Stars	Released: August 7, 2020; Label: Lambent Light Records; Formats: CD, music download	—	35	6	—	—	—	—	
Looking for the Thread (with Julie Fowlis and Karine Polwart)	Released: January 24, 2025; Label: Lambent Light Records; Formats: CD, music download	—	—	—	—	—	—	—	
Personal History	Released: June 6, 2025; Label: Lambent Light Records; Formats: CD, vinyl, music download	—	—	—	—	—	—	—	
"—" denotes a recording that did not chart or was not released in that territory.

=== Compilation albums ===
List of albums, with selected chart positions and certifications, showing other relevant details
Title	Album details	Peak chart positions			Certifications
Title	Album details	US	US Country	AUS	Certifications
Party Doll and Other Favorites	Released: May 25, 1999; Label: Columbia; Formats: Cassette, CD, music download	43	4	164	RIAA: Gold
The Essential Mary Chapin Carpenter	Released: November 4, 2003; Label: Columbia; Formats: CD, music download	—	60	—	
Super Hits	Released: May 22, 2007; Label: Columbia/Legacy; Formats: CD, music download	—	—	—	
Playlist: The Very Best of Mary Chapin Carpenter	Released: August 19, 2008; Label: Columbia/Legacy; Formats: CD, music download	—	—	—	
"—" denotes a recording that did not chart or was not released in that territory.

=== Live albums ===
List of albums, with other relevant details
Title	Album details
Jubilee: Live at Wolf Trap	Released: January 9, 1996; Label: Columbia Records; Formats: VHS, DVD
One Night Lonely	Released: August 13, 2021; Label: Lambent Light; Formats: CD, music download, vinyl

== Singles ==
=== As lead artist ===
List of singles, with selected chart positions, showing other relevant details
Title	Year	Peak chart positions							Album
Title	Year	US	US Cou.	US AC	CAN	CAN Cou.	CAN AC	UK	Album
"A Lot Like Me"	1987	—	—	—	—	—	—	—	Hometown Girl
"Just Because"	1988	—	—	—	—	—	—	—	Hometown Girl
"How Do"	1989	—	19	—	—	44	—	—	State of the Heart
"Never Had It So Good"	1989	—	8	—	—	6	—	—	State of the Heart
"Quittin' Time"	1990	—	7	—	—	8	—	—	State of the Heart
"Something of a Dreamer"	1990	—	14	—	—	8	—	—	State of the Heart
"You Win Again"	1990	—	16	—	—	6	—	—	Shooting Straight in the Dark
"Right Now"	1991	—	15	—	—	14	—	—	Shooting Straight in the Dark
"Down at the Twist and Shout"	1991	—	2	—	—	7	—	—	Shooting Straight in the Dark
"Going Out Tonight"	1991	—	14	—	—	13	—	—	Shooting Straight in the Dark
"I Feel Lucky"	1992	—	4	—	—	3	16	—	Come On Come On
"Not Too Much to Ask" (with Joe Diffie)	1992	—	15	—	—	12	—	—	Come On Come On
"Passionate Kisses"	1993	57	4	11	39	5	17	78	Come On Come On
"The Hard Way"	1993	—	11	—	—	11	—	—	Come On Come On
"The Bug"	1993	—	16	—	—	24	—	—	Come On Come On
"He Thinks He'll Keep Her"	1993	—	2	—	—	6	—	71	Come On Come On
"I Take My Chances"	1994	—	2	—	—	2	—	—	Come On Come On
"Shut Up and Kiss Me"	1994	90	1	—	—	5	—	35	Stones in the Road
"Tender When I Want to Be"	1994	—	6	—	—	2	—	—	Stones in the Road
"House of Cards"	1995	—	21	—	—	22	—	—	Stones in the Road
"Why Walk When You Can Fly"	1995	—	45	—	—	43	—	—	Stones in the Road
"Grow Old with Me"	1996	—	—	17	—	—	—	—	Working Class Hero: A Tribute to John Lennon
"Let Me into Your Heart"	1996	—	11	—	—	5	—	—	A Place in the World
"I Want to Be Your Girlfriend"	1997	—	35	—	—	33	—	—	A Place in the World
"The Better to Dream of You"	1997	—	64	—	—	85	—	—	A Place in the World
"Keeping the Faith"	1997	—	58	—	—	—	—	—	A Place in the World
"Almost Home"	1999	85	22	—	—	45	—	—	Party Doll and Other Favorites
"Wherever You Are"	1999	—	55	—	—	74	—	—	Party Doll and Other Favorites
"Simple Life"	2001	—	53	—	—	—	—	—	Time* Sex* Love*
"This Is Me Leaving You"	2001	—	—	—	—	—	—	—	Time* Sex* Love*
"Beautiful Racket"	2004	—	—	—	—	—	—	—	Between Here and Gone
"What Would You Say to Me"	2004	—	—	—	—	—	—	—	Between Here and Gone
"On with the Song"	2007	—	—	—	—	—	—	—	The Calling
"It Must Have Happened"	2007	—	—	—	—	—	—	—	The Calling
"Christmas Time in the City"	2008	—	—	—	—	—	—	—	Come Darkness, Come Light: Twelve Songs of Christmas
"I Put My Ring Back On"	2010	—	—	—	—	—	—	—	The Age of Miracles
"The Way I Feel"	2010	—	—	—	—	—	—	—	The Age of Miracles
"Soul Companion" (featuring James Taylor)	2012	—	—	—	—	—	—	—	Ashes and Roses
"Ideas Are Like Stars"	2014	—	—	—	—	—	—	—	Songs from the Movie
"Something Tamed Something Wild"	2016	—	—	—	—	—	—	—	The Things That We Are Made Of
"Heroes and Heroines"	2018	—	—	—	—	—	—	—	Sometimes Just the Sky
"Our Man Walter Cronkite"	2019	—	—	—	—	—	—	—	The Dirt and the Stars
"—" denotes a recording that did not chart or was not released in that territory.

=== As featured artist ===
List of singles, with selected chart positions, showing other relevant details
Title	Year	Peak chart positions				Album
Title	Year	US	US Cou.	CAN Cou.	UK	Album
"Romeo" (credited as Dolly Parton and Friends)	1993	50	27	33	—	Slow Dancing with the Moon
"One Cool Remove" (Shawn Colvin with Mary Chapin Carpenter)	1995	—	—	—	40	Cover Girl
"It's Only Love" (Randy Scruggs with Mary Chapin Carpenter)	1998	—	67	—	—	Crown of Jewels
"—" denotes a recording that did not chart or was not released in that territory.

== Videography ==
=== Video albums ===
List of video albums, showing all relevant details
Title	Album details
My Record Company Made Me Do This	Released: November 1, 1994; Label: Columbia; Formats: VHS
Jubilee: Live at Wolf Trap	Released: January 9, 1996; Label: Sony; Formats: DVD, VHS
Musical Tribute to the Red Cross (with Kevin Pollak and Sawyer Brown)	Released: October 27, 2006; Label: Unicorn; Formats: DVD

=== Music videos ===
List of music videos, showing year released and director
Title	Year	Director(s)	Ref.
"Never Had It So Good"	1989	Ken Ross	
"This Shirt"	1990	Bill Pope	
"You Win Again"	1990	Bill Pope	
"Down at the Twist and Shout"	1991	Jack Cole	
"I Feel Lucky"	1992	Jack Cole	
"Passionate Kisses"	1993	Markus Blunder	
"Romeo" (as Dolly Parton and Friends)	1993	Randee St. Nicholas	
"He Thinks He'll Keep Her"	1994	Bud Schaetzle	
"Shut Up and Kiss Me"	1994	Michael Salomon	
"Tender When I Want to Be"	1995	Michael Salomon	
"House of Cards"	1995	Michael Salomon	
"One Cool Remove" (with Shawn Colvin)	1995	David Hogan	
"Let Me Into Your Heart"	1996	Steven Goldmann	
"The Better to Dream of You"	1997	Steven Goldmann	
"Almost Home"	1999	Randy Spear	
"Wherever You Are"	1999	Steven Goldmann	

== Other appearances ==
List of guest appearances, along with other performing artists, showing year released and album name
Title	Year	Other artist(s)	Album
"Happy Trails"	1987	Cathy Fink	When the Rain Comes Down
"I Will Stand Fast"	1988	Fred Small	I Will Stand Fast
"Honeydripper"	1989	Tom Principato	I Know What You're Thinkin'...
"Hammer and a Nail"	1990	Indigo Girls	Nomads Indians Saints
"Last Chance Waltz"	1991	David Wilcox	Home Again
"Climb On (A Back That's Strong)"	1992	Shawn Colvin	Fat City
"Nobody Wins"	1992	Radney Foster	Del Rio, TX 1959
"Jenny Dreamed of Trains"	1992	none	Disney's Country Kids
"Dreamland"	1992	none	'Til Their Eyes Shine (The Lullaby Album)
"The Wheel"	1993	Rosanne Cash	The Wheel
"Talking to a Stranger"	1993	Rodney Crowell	Greatest Hits
"Ain't That as Good"	1993	Patty Larkin	Angels Running
"I Told Him That My Dog Wouldn't Run"	1993	Patty Larkin	Angels Running
"You Ain't Going Nowhere"	1993	Rosanne Cash, Shawn Colvin	The 30th Anniversary Concert Celebration
"Romeo" (credited as "Dolly Parton and Friends")	1993	Dolly Parton	Slow Dancing with the Moon
"The Moon and St. Christopher"	1994	none	1992 Telluride Bluegrass Festival: Incredibly Live
"One Cool Remove"	1994	Shawn Colvin	Cover Girl
"When You Walk in the Room" (featuring Mary Chapin Carpenter and Kim Richey)	1994	Pam Tillis	Sweetheart's Dance
"Out of the Valley"	1994	John Gorka	Out of the Valley
"Flying Red Horse"	1994	John Gorka	Out of the Valley
"It Don't Bring You"	1994	none	Shelter: Best of Contemporary Singer-Songwriters
"Diamonds and Rust"	1995	Joan Baez	Ring Them Bells
"Never Say Die"	1995	Radney Foster	Labor of Love
"We All Get Lucky Sometimes"	1995	Lee Roy Parnell	We All Get Lucky Sometimes
"Where Is a Woman to Go" (featuring Mary Chapin Carpenter K.T. Oslin)	1995	Dusty Springfield	A Very Fine Love
"Grow Old with Me"	1995	none	Working Class Hero: A Tribute to John Lennon
"O Mexico"	1995	Trisha Yearwood	Thinkin' About You
"You Didn't Mind"	1996	Rory Block	Tornado
"Wishing"	1996	Kevin Montgomery	Not Fade Away (Remembering Buddy Holly)
"Endless Seasons"	1996	The Rankin Family	Endless Seasons
"Round of Blues" (Live)	1996	Shawn Colvin	Columbia Records Radio Hour, Vol. 2
"Sugar for Sugar"	1996	Robin and Linda Williams	Sugar for Sugar
"Streets of Gold"	1996	Robin and Linda Williams	Sugar for Sugar
"Dead Man Walking (A Dream Like This)"	1997	none	Dead Man Walking: Music from and Inspired by the Motion Picture
"Somewhere Down Below the Mason Dixon Line"	1997	none	Songs of Jimmie Rodgers: A Tribute
"I'll Never Fall in Love Again"	1997	none	My Best Friend's Wedding: Music from the Motion Picture
"That's Exactly What I Mean"	1997	Patty Loveless	Long Stretch of Lonesome
"I Belong to You"	1998	John Jennings	I Belong to You
"The Next in Line"	1998	John Jennings	I Belong to You
"It's Only Love"	1998	Randy Scruggs	Crown of Jewels
"Oh Lonesome Me"	1998	none	A Tribute to Tradition
"Bells Are Ringing"	1999	none	And So This Is Christmas
"Deserted Soldier"	1999	The Chieftains	Tears of Stone
"Pretty Polly"	1999	Darol Anger	Heritage
"Roses"	1999	Catie Curtis	A Crash Course in Roses
"Rumble"	2000	Robin and Linda Williams	In the Company of Strangers
"So Long, See You Tomorrow"	2000	Robin and Linda Williams	In the Company of Strangers
"Where Are You Now"	2000	Trisha Yearwood	Real Live Woman
"Alone But Not Lonely"	2000	Mary Ann Redmond	Here I Am
"Blue Night"	2000	Ricky Skaggs	Big Mon: The Songs of Bill Monroe
"The Moon and St. Christopher" (Live)	2001	Mary Black	The Best of Mary Black 1991–2001 and Hidden Harvest
"This Shirt" (Live)	2001	none	Concerts for a Landmine-Free World
"Silent Night"	2002	Garrison Starr	Songs from Take Off to Landing
"Hardest Part of Living"	2002	Garrison Starr	Songs from Take Off to Landing
"Spring and All"	2002	none	Going Driftless: An Artist's Tribute to Greg Brown
"Flesh and Blood"	2002	Sheryl Crow, Emmylou Harris	Kindred Spirits: A Tribute to the Songs of Johnny Cash
"Empty Rooms"	2003	Caitlin Cary	I'm Staying Out
"The Next One"	2003	Caitlin Cary	I'm Staying Out
"Lorraine Today"	2003	Caitlin Cary	I'm Staying Out
"Home #235"	2004	Robin and Linda Williams	Deeper Waters
"Old Plank Road"	2004	Robin and Linda Williams	Deeper Waters
"Peace Call"	2004	Eliza Gilkyson	Land of Milk and Honey
"Laughlin Boy"	2005	Tracy Grammer	Flower of Avalon
"Mother, I Climbed"	2005	Tracy Grammer	Flower of Avalon
"Any Way I Do"	2005	Tracy Grammer	Flower of Avalon
"Unchained Melody" (Live)	2005	The Boomchicks; John Cowan	Telluride Bluegrass Festival: 30 Years
"Water and Stone"	2006	Catie Curtis	Long Night Moon
"One More Time"	2007	Donna Hughes	Gaining Wisdom
"Father Time"	2007	Donna Hughes	Gaining Wisdom
"Scattered to the Wind"	2007	Donna Hughes	Gaining Wisdom
"Not Anymore"	2007	Donna Hughes	Gaining Wisdom
"Hold On"	2007	Donna Hughes	Gaining Wisdom
"The Weeping Willow"	2007	Devon Sproule	Keep Your Silver Shined
"Violets of Dawn"	2009	none	The Village (429)
"Before and After"	2010	Carrie Newcomer	Before and After
"Chained to Those Lovin' Arms"	2010	Patty Larkin	25
"Let It Last"	2011	Catie Curtis	Stretch Limousine on Fire
"Traveling Shoes" (featuring Mary Chapin Carpenter and Aoife O'Donovan)	2012	Caroline Herring	Camilia
"White Dress"	2012	Caroline Herring	Camilia
"Home"	2012	Kate Rusby	20
"I Have a Need for Solitude" (with various artists)	2013	none	Transatlantic Sessions 6, Vol. 1
"A Quiet Line"	2013	Lucy Wainwright Roche	There's a Last Time for Everything
"I Guess He'd Rather Be in Colorado"	2013	none	The Music Is You: A Tribute to John Denver
"It Don't Bring You"	2014	Aly Bain	Transatlantic Sessions: Series 6, Vol.3
"Transcendental Reunion" (with various artists)	2014	none	Transatlantic Sessions: Series 6, Vol. 2
"Oh Mama" (with various artists)	2014	none	Transatlantic Sessions: Series 6, Vol. 2
"Catch the Wind"	2016	Joan Baez	75th Birthday Celebration
"All the Roadrunning"	2016	Vince Gill	The Life & Songs of Emmylou Harris: An All-Star Concert Celebration

== See also ==
- List of awards and nominations received by Mary Chapin Carpenter
