= Jubilee: Live at Wolf Trap =

Video live by Mary Chapin Carpenter
- Released: January 9, 1996
- Venue: Filene Center at Wolf Trap National Park for the Performing Arts, Wolf Trap, Virginia, United States
- Genre: Country
- Language: English
- Label: Columbia Music Video

Mary Chapin Carpenter chronology
| Stones in the Road (1994) | Jubilee: Live at Wolf Trap (1996) | A Place in the World (1996) |

Jubilee: Live at Wolf Trap is a 1996 live video album from American country musician Mary Chapin Carpenter. It was recorded and released 25 years before her second live performance video, One Night Lonely, also recorded at the same venue.

== Reception ==
The editorial staff of AllMusic Guide scored this album three out of five stars, with reviewer Perry Seibert commenting that this is a "warm, engaging performance" that will please existing fans and may give her new ones as well.

The video entered Billboard's Top Music Videos chart on January 27, 1996 at number 35 and remained on the charts until at least November 22, 1997 (the subsequent issue does not track this chart).

== Track listing and DVD features ==
1. Program start
2. "Why Walk When You Can Fly"
3. "Passionate Kisses"
4. "I Feel Lucky"
5. "Jubilee"
6. "Shut Up and Kiss Me"
7. "A Keeper for Every Flame"
8. "That's the Way Love Goes"
9. "Come On Come On"
10. "The Last Word"
11. "John Doe No. 24"
12. "Only a Dream"
13. "I Am a Town"
14. "Can't Take Love for Granted"
15. "Stones in the Road"
16. "The Hard Way"
17. "Quittin' Time"
18. "He Thinks He'll Keep Her"
19. "Down at the Twist and Shout"
20. "Jubilee" (reprise)

Special features include a discography and interview footage

== Personnel ==
Adapted from onscreen credits towards the end of the video.

- Mary Chapin Carpenter – acoustic guitar, vocals

Additional musicians

- Joan Baez – vocal duet on "Stones in the Road"
- JT Brown – bass, vocals
- Jonathan Carroll – keyboards, accordion, vocals
- Shawn Colvin – vocal duet on "That's the Way Love Goes"
- John Jennings – guitars, vocals
- Duke Levine – guitars
- Robbie Magruder – drums

Technical personnel

- Jim Brown – direction
- William Campbell – photography

== See also ==
- List of 1996 albums
