= Sometimes Just the Sky =

Studio album by Mary Chapin Carpenter
- Released: March 30, 2018
- Studio: Real World Studios, Box, Wiltshire, England, United Kingdom
- Genre: Country, folk
- Length: 61:16
- Language: English
- Label: Lambent Light
- Producer: Ethan Johns

Mary Chapin Carpenter chronology
The Things That We Are Made Of (2016)	Sometimes Just the Sky (2018)	The Dirt and the Stars (2020)

Sometimes Just the Sky is the 15th studio album by American singer-songwriter Mary Chapin Carpenter, released by Lambent Light Records on March 30, 2018. It features re-recorded songs from earlier in her career, with one track from each of her previous studio albums and a new title track. The album has received positive reviews from critics and was commercially successful, placing on several charts, and topping Official Americana Albums Chart in the United Kingdom.

== Recording and release ==
The album was recorded live in studio at Real World Studios and was accompanied by a tour celebrating 30 years of Carpenter's recording career. Carpenter set about to make the new recordings by choosing songs that were not hits of hers and that she also had not recorded on her 2014 orchestral album Songs from the Movie, which saw 10 cuts from her career reintepreted.

== Reception ==
The editorial staff of AllMusic scored Sometimes Just the Sky 31/2-stars-out-of-5, with reviewer Mark Deming comparing this to Songs from the Movie; he considers this re-recorded material to have "a strong enough personality of its own that it avoids this pitfall" of being weaker than the originals or unable to stand on its own as a musical statement. Jim Hynes of Glide rated this release a nine out of 10, writing that fans can enjoy "intense listening" to the instrumentation and sometimes radical reinterpretations of Carpenter's songs, summing up that "there’s more than enough to savor here" while waiting for an album of new material.

== Track listing ==
All songs written by Mary Chapin Carpenter

1. "Heroes and Heroines" – 4:14
2. "What Does It Mean to Travel" – 3:36
3. "I Have a Need for Solitude" – 4:35
4. "One Small Heart" – 5:18
5. "The Moon and St. Christopher" – 4:25
6. "Superman" – 6:08
7. "Naked to the Eye" – 3:31
8. "Rhythm of the Blues" – 3:59
9. "This Is Love" – 5:20
10. "Jericho" – 4:43
11. "The Calling" – 4:02
12. "This Shirt" – 5:02
13. "Sometimes Just the Sky" – 6:23

== Personnel ==
- Mary Chapin Carpenter – acoustic guitar, vocals
- Dave Bronze – bass guitar
- Aaron Farrington – photography
- Daniel Hosterman – live performance photography
- Oli Jacobs – assistant engineering
- Stephanie Jean – piano, Omnichord, organ, harmonium, Wurlitzer keyboards
- Ethan Johns – acoustic guitar, electric guitar, slide guitar, mandolin, mandocello, tipple, mountain dulcimer, mixing at Three Crows East, production, in-studio photography
- Georgina Leach – violin, viola
- Duke Levine – electric guitar, acoustic guitar, e-bow; mandolin on "Naked to the Eye"
- Dom Monks – recording
- Mandy Parnell – mastering at Black Saloon Studios
- Jeremy Stacey – drums, percussion
- Lisa Wright – design

== Chart performance ==
Chart performance for Sometimes Just the Sky
Chart (2018)	Peak position
US Independent Albums (Billboard)	7
US Folk Albums (Billboard)	13
US Top Country Albums (Billboard)	29
US Top Album Sales (Billboard)	42
UK Albums (OCC)	74
UK Americana Albums (OCC)	1
UK Independent Albums (OCC)	6

== See also ==
- List of 2018 albums
