= A Place in the World (Mary Chapin Carpenter album) =

Studio album by Mary Chapin Carpenter
- Released: October 22, 1996
- Genre: Country
- Length: 45:06
- Label: Columbia Nashville/TriStar
- Producers: Mary Chapin Carpenter; John Jennings

Mary Chapin Carpenter chronology
Jubilee: Live at Wolf Trap (1996)	A Place in the World (1996)	Party Doll and Other Favorites (1999)

Professional ratings
Review scores
Source	Rating
AllMusic	3/5 stars
Chicago Tribune	3/4 stars
Robert Christgau	B−
Entertainment Weekly	B
Q	4/5 stars

A Place in the World is the sixth studio album by American singer-songwriter Mary Chapin Carpenter, released by Columbia Records on October 22, 1996. It rose to No. 3 on the Billboard's Country Albums chart and No. 20 on the Billboard 200, with four of its tracks reaching the Hot Country Songs chart: "Let Me into Your Heart" (No. 11), "I Want to Be Your Girlfriend" (No. 35), and "Keeping the Faith" (No. 58).

== Track listing ==
All songs written by Mary Chapin Carpenter.

No.	Title	Length
1.	"Keeping the Faith"	3:19
2.	"Hero in Your Own Hometown"	3:50
3.	"I Can See It Now"	3:34
4.	"I Want to Be Your Girlfriend"	3:30
5.	"Let Me into Your Heart"	2:54
6.	"What If We Went to Italy"	3:38
7.	"That's Real"	3:53
8.	"Ideas Are Like Stars"	4:05
9.	"Naked to the Eye"	3:54
10.	"Sudden Gift of Fate"	5:05
11.	"The Better to Dream of You"	3:18
12.	"A Place in the World"	4:06
Total length:		45:06

== Personnel ==
- Pete Barenbregge – tenor saxophone
- J.T. Brown – background vocals
- Jon Carroll – piano, accordion, background vocals
- Mary Chapin Carpenter – lead vocals, background vocals, acoustic guitar
- Shawn Colvin – background vocals
- Mike Crotty – baritone saxophone, tenor saxophone
- Bob Glaub – bass guitar
- Rich Haering – trumpet
- John Jennings – acoustic guitar, electric guitar, backpacker, baritone guitar, bass guitar, fretless bass, lap steel guitar, percussion, synthesizer, background vocals
- Duke Levine – electric guitar, mandola
- Robbie Magruder – drums
- Dave Mattacks – drums, tambourine
- Kim Richey – background vocals
- Harry Stinson – drums, cowbell
- Benmont Tench – piano, organ

=== String section ===
- Kim Miller, Margaraet Gutierrez, Lilly Soong Kramer, Theresa Lazar, Steven Romer, Matthew Loden, Mark Dulac, Ozman Kivrak, Joan Singer, Vickie Yanics, Tracy Jasas, Christoff Richter – violins
- Marcio Botelho, Timothy Butler, Russell Powell, Nancy Jo Snyder, David Teie – cellos

Strings and horns conducted and arranged by Michael "Rico" Petruccelli.

== Charts ==
=== Weekly charts ===
Chart (1996)	Peak position
Australian Albums (ARIA)	121
Canadian Country Albums (RPM)	13
Scottish Albums (Official Charts)	33
UK Albums (Official Charts)	36
US Billboard 200	20
US Top Country Albums (Billboard)	3

=== Year-end charts ===
Chart (1996)	Position
US Top Country Albums (Billboard)	75
Chart (1997)	Position
US Top Country Albums (Billboard)	30

== Certifications ==
Region	Certification	Certified units/sales
Canada (Music Canada)	Gold	50,000^{^}
United States (RIAA)	Gold	500,000^{^}
^{^} Shipments figures based on certification alone.
