= The Calling (Mary Chapin Carpenter album) =

Studio album by Mary Chapin Carpenter
- Released: March 6, 2007
- Genre: Country
- Label: Zoë
- Producers: Mary Chapin Carpenter; Matt Rollings

Mary Chapin Carpenter chronology
Between Here and Gone (2004)	The Calling (2007)	Come Darkness, Come Light: Twelve Songs of Christmas (2008)

The Calling is the ninth studio album by American singer-songwriter Mary Chapin Carpenter, released by Zoë Records on March 6, 2007. Carpenter had previously been on Columbia Nashville; this album was her first release on a new label, as well as her first studio album since 2004's Between Here and Gone. Like her previous release, she wrote every song on the album, which went to No. 10 on the Billboard Top Country Albums chart.

Two singles were released, On With the Song and It Must Have Happened, but neither charted on the Billboard Hot Country Songs.

== Reception ==
Professional ratings
Aggregate scores
Source	Rating
Metacritic	(77/100)
Review scores
Source	Rating
About.com	5/5 stars
AllMusic	4/5 stars
BBC Music	(mixed)
The Boston Globe	(positive)
Hot Press	(favorable)
Paste	(6/10)
The Phoenix	3/4 stars
PopMatters	7/10 stars

Thom Jurek of AllMusic gave the album 4-out-of-5-stars and said: "Time will tell, of course, but in The Calling, Carpenter may have her finest moment yet; it also feels like an artistic rebirth. These songs come from her marrow and the conviction she sings them with proves it. Carpenter and her co-producer Matt Rollings should be awfully proud of this one."

== Track listing ==
All songs written by Mary Chapin Carpenter.

1. "The Calling" - 4:17
2. "We're All Right" - 3:47
3. "Twilight" - 4:30
4. "It Must Have Happened" - 4:05
5. "On and on It Goes" - 4:20
6. "Your Life Story" - 4:20
7. "Houston" - 5:45
8. "Leaving Song" - 4:02
9. "On With the Song" - 3:58
10. "Closer and Closer Apart" - 4:31
11. "Here I Am" - 4:17
12. "Why Shouldn't We" - 5:04
13. "Bright Morning Star" - 4:55

== Credits ==
=== Production ===
- Mary Chapin Carpenter, Matt Rollings - producers
- Chuck Ainlay - engineer, mixing
- Scott Kidd - engineer
- Bob Ludwig - mastering

=== Personnel ===
- Mary Chapin Carpenter - vocals, acoustic guitar
- Eric Darken - percussion, vibraphone
- John Jennings - dulcimer, electric guitar, baritone guitar, background vocals
- Russ Kunkel - drums, percussion, cajon
- Dean Parks - electric guitar, acoustic guitar, 12-string guitar
- Matt Rollings - Hammond organ, piano, accordion
- Glenn Worf - bass guitar

== Chart performance ==
Chart (2007)	Peak position
US Billboard 200	55
US Top Country Albums (Billboard)	10
