= Come Darkness, Come Light: Twelve Songs of Christmas =

Studio album by Mary Chapin Carpenter
- Released: September 30, 2008
- Genre: Christmas, country
- Length: 48:55
- Label: Zoë
- Producer: Mary Chapin Carpenter; John Jennings

Mary Chapin Carpenter chronology
| The Calling (2007) | Come Darkness, Come Light: Twelve Songs of Christmas (2008) | The Age of Miracles (2010) |

Come Darkness, Come Light: Twelve Songs of Christmas is the 10th studio album and first Christmas album by American singer-songwriter Mary Chapin Carpenter. It was released on September 30, 2008, by Zoë Records, her second release under this label, and was produced by Carpenter and John Jennings.

The album peaked at No. 30 on the Billboard Top Country Albums chart, No. 155 on the Billboard 200, and No. 7 on the Billboard Top Holiday Albums chart.

== Background ==
Come Darkness Come Light: Twelve Songs of Christmas contained twelve songs of Christmas-themed songs, six of which were written or co-written by Carpenter. The six additional tracks consisted of rare traditional holiday songs. The album features collaborations with Carpenter's producer of many of her previous albums John Jennings. Come Darkness, Come Light includes cover of songs by Robin and Linda Williams, Tommy Thompson, and composer John Rutter. The opening track "Once in Royal David's City" was originally performed during the Festival of Nine Lessons and Carols in Cambridge, England, which Carpenter states she listens to every Christmas. Mark Deming of Allmusic thought that the album focused more on the "thoughtful and spiritual side of the season", while Scott Sexton of About.com said that the album's arrangement evoked "a calming vibe that is perfect for any holiday event".

In an interview with Country Music Television in late 2008, Carpenter explained that she and producer John Jennings tried to create a more solemn approach to the record, without the use of symphonies or orchestras. In the interview, Carpenter commented that she wanted to keep the focus of the album "spare" and make its sound more acoustic.

"That was the whole point from the beginning -- to make a real acoustic record. Whatever instruments we thought might add a texture or color, John was able to provide himself. We brought in Jon Carroll, my longtime keyboard player. He is so gifted, and he really did the heavy lifting on the piano, but John was able to fill in where it was needed. At most, there were three people in the room, but mostly it was me and John. It's really fun to do that. You feel like you're wacky scientists, late at night in the lab, experimenting to your heart's content."

== Critical reception ==
Professional ratings
Review scores
| Source | Rating |
|---|---|
| About.com | 4/5 stars |
| AllMusic | 4/5 stars |
| The Daily Vault | A |

Come Darkness, Come Light: Twelve Songs of Christmas mainly received positive reviews from music magazines and critics. Mark Deming of AllMusic gave the album four out of five stars, and called the record in general to be a "brave" collection of songs to choose. Deming praised producer John Jennings for creating "a record that's as thoughtful in its music as its lyrics". To conclude his review, Deming stated, "Come Darkness, Come Light is a brave and beautiful collection of songs that dares to run counter to what most folks expect from a Christmas album, and it asks some questions worth pondering about the meaning behind the annual celebration while mirroring the simple joys of a snowy night." Come Darkness, Come Light also received a review from Christmas Reviews.com which said that the album was "Folksy" and "warm". Reviewer Carol Swanson praised Carpenter's "Thanksgiving Song", which she found to covey a significant message. In conclusion, Swanson stated, "Mary Chapin Carpenter's throaty, deep vocals provide texture and comfort. Twelve Songs of Christmas delivers a dozen excellent tracks, all nicely wrapped in the soft warmth of MCC's voice. Superb!"

Come Darkness, Come Light was also reviewed by Scott Sexton of About.com, who also gave the record four out of five stars. Sexton reported that the album's tracks "stand the test of time", and although it is not a conventional Christmas album, it does offer "awesome" songs that were not often recorded by other artists. Sexton further praised the release by saying, "Christmas time is the season for giving and that is exactly what country music entertainer, Mary Chapin Carpenter is doing. Fans can hear a new collection of Christmas favorites that have been written by Mary, along with a couple of classics mixed into the album. The whole record gives off a calming vibe that is perfect for any holiday event. Mary has a voice that is great anytime of the year, but for Christmas, her voice is golden." Nick Coleman of the United Kingdom's The Independent found that Come Darkness, Come Light expressed "a feast of genteel cliché and righteous cheer." Coleman in addition praised Carpenter's voice, which he called "mumsy" and "cushioned in Grammy-grabbing micro-arrangements and pitched squarely at the non-evangelistic sensibility in its buttoned-up cardie."

== Track listing ==
| No. | Title | Writer(s) | Length |
|---|---|---|---|
| 1. | "Once in Royal David's City" | Cecil Frances Alexander, Henry John Gauntlett | 3:24 |
| 2. | "Hot Buttered Rum" | Tommy Thompson | 3:29 |
| 3. | "Still, Still, Still" | Traditional | 3:28 |
| 4. | "On a Quiet Christmas Morn" | Robin and Linda Williams | 3:52 |
| 5. | "Come Darkness, Come Light" | Mary Chapin Carpenter | 4:01 |
| 6. | "Christmas Time in the City" | Carpenter, John Jennings | 3:23 |
| 7. | "Candlelight Carol" | John Rutter | 4:00 |
| 8. | "The Longest Night of the Year" | Carpenter | 3:34 |
| 9. | "Thanksgiving Song" | Carpenter | 2:52 |
| 10. | "Bells Are Ringing" | Carpenter, Jennings | 3:34 |
| 11. | "Christmas Carol" | Carpenter | 5:11 |
| 12. | "Children, Go Where I Send Thee" | Traditional | 8:07 |
| Total length: | | | 48:55 |

== Personnel ==
Musicians

- Jon Carroll – piano
- Mary Chapin Carpenter – acoustic guitar, harmony vocals, lead vocals
- John Jennings – accordion, acoustic guitar, bass, drums, electric guitar, harmony vocals, piano, percussion

Technical personnel

- Mary Chapin Carpenter – photography
- John Jennings – engineering, mixing
- Charlie Pilzer – mastering
- Sarah Lainie Radawich – cover design
- Carla Sacks – publicity

== Sales chart positions ==
| Chart (2008) | Peak position |
|---|---|
| US Billboard 200 | 155 |
| US Top Country Albums (Billboard) | 30 |
| US Top Holiday Albums (Billboard) | 7 |
