= The Age of Miracles (album) =

Studio album by Mary Chapin Carpenter
- Released: April 27, 2010
- Genres: Folk; country
- Length: 50:12
- Label: Zoë
- Producers: Mary Chapin Carpenter; Matt Rollings

Mary Chapin Carpenter chronology
Come Darkness, Come Light: Twelve Songs of Christmas (2008)	The Age of Miracles (2010)	Ashes and Roses (2012)

The Age of Miracles is the 11th studio album by American singer-songwriter Mary Chapin Carpenter, released on April 27, 2010 by Zoë Records, her third album released under the Zoë label.

Produced by Carpenter and Matt Rollings, the album peaked at No. 6 on Billboard's Country Albums chart and No. 28 on the Billboard 200.

== Background and content ==
The Age of Miracles consists of twelve tracks of new material, all of which were written solely by Mary Chapin Carpenter. In an interview, Carpenter explained the album's thematic significance. She commented that the album's title track reflects on Hurricane Katrina and its aftermath, while the album's seventh track ("Mrs. Hemingway") is about the first wife of author Ernest Hemingway. She also mentioned that the fifth track "4 June 1989" explains the Tiananmen Square Massacre and its remembrance by Chinese activist Chen Gueng.

The album is generally considered to feature a mix of styles. Cody Miller of PopMatters found that The Age of Miracles contained mainly a mixture of "uptempo numbers and mournful ballads," and that the release was "classic MCC: sober, insightful, whimsical, and beautiful." However, in contrast, Jonathan Keefe of Slant Magazine commented that the album's production never strays too far from the "pedestrian, coffeehouse blend of hushed acoustic strumming." The album reflects its country roots, with Vince Gill and Alison Krauss performing background vocals on several songs. However, other tracks, such as the ninth song "What You Look For," sound "electric" according to Engine 145 magazine.

Thematically, tracks on The Age of Miracles sound more emotional, according to PopMatters, who described "The Way I Feel" as having "plenty of room to relive the frustration she displayed so measured and matured on “Passionate Kisses”." In addition, the track "Iceland" uses metaphors to explain the song's thesis.

== Critical reception ==
Professional ratings
Aggregate scores
Source	Rating
Metacritic	(63/100)
Review scores
Source	Rating
AllMusic	4/5 stars
Billboard	(favorable)
The Boston Globe	(average)
Paste	(3.6/10)
The Phoenix	2.5/4 stars
PopMatters	6/10 stars
Q	3/5 stars
Slant Magazine	2/5 stars
Engine 145	3.5/5 stars
Under the Radar	4/10 stars

The Age of Miracles mainly received positive reviews from music critics and magazines. On Metacritic, it has been given a score of 63 out of 100 based on 9 "generally favorable reviews". Mark Deming of AllMusic gave the release four out of five stars, calling the album "literate and thoughtful." Deming later concluded "Mary Chapin Carpenter doesn't sound especially concerned with how much product she'll move on The Age of Miracles; instead, she's made an album that speaks with honesty and clarity about the mysteries of love and fate, and she communicates well enough that it's hard to imagine anyone who has ever thought about the ways life can turn on a dime not being moved by the beauty of this music." Engine 145's Jim Caligiuri gave the album three and a half out of five stars, finding that the effort had a "distinct point of view" but was too outspoken and "Folksie." Caligiuri later concluded by saying "Hot young country, or whatever they’re calling it these days, it’s not – but those seeking something with meaning and artistry will find a lot to appreciate in The Age Of Miracles."

The Age of Miracles was also reviewed by Jonathan Keefe of Slant Magazine, who only gave the album two out of five stars. Keefe found that although the album was inspired by current events, the material seemed to feel "dull" and "lifeless." Keefe explained his reasoning, saying "Carpenter's early albums balanced her folkier tendencies with inspired elements of contemporary country and pop. But on Miracles, she and co-producer Matt Rollings rarely stray from a pedestrian, coffeehouse blend of hushed acoustic strumming. Songs like 'We Traveled So Far,' 'I Was a Bird,' and 'I Have a Need for Solitude' run together as though afraid to impose themselves, resulting in an album that seems a great deal longer than it really is." Finally, the album was reviewed by PopMatters' Cody Miller, who gave the release a six out of ten rating. Miller reported that "The Age Of Miracles confirms once again (not that it was ever in question) that Carpenter is a strong songwriter and a seasoned singer. For every single Sugarland, Lady Antebellum, or Swift rackup, Carpenter should be thanked."

== Track listing ==
All songs composed by Mary Chapin Carpenter.

1. "We Traveled So Far" – 4:27
2. "Zephyr" – 3:34
3. "I Put My Ring Back On" – 2:45
  - featuring Vince Gill
4. "Holding Up the Sky" – 4:48
5. "4 June 1989" – 4:47
6. "I Was a Bird" – 3:26
7. "Mrs. Hemingway" – 5:59
8. "I Have a Need for Solitude" – 3:43
9. "What You Look For" – 4:08
10. "Iceland" – 4:44
11. "The Age of Miracles" – 4:32
12. "The Way I Feel" – 3:19

Amazon exclusive bonus track

13. "The Edge of the World" – 5:14

iTunes exclusive bonus track

13. "This Is Home" – 5:35

== Personnel ==
- Mary Chapin Carpenter – lead vocals
- Eric Darken – percussion
- Dan Dugmore – 12-string guitar, steel guitar
- Vince Gill – background vocals (track 3)
- Russ Kunkel – drums
- Alison Krauss – background vocals
- Duke Levine – acoustic guitar, electric guitar
- Matt Rollings – b-3 organ, piano
- Glenn Worf – bass

== Chart positions ==
Chart performance for The Age of Miracles
Chart (2010)	Peak position
US Billboard 200	28
US Top Country Albums (Billboard)	6
US Americana/Folk Albums (Billboard)	1
