= Ashes and Roses =

Studio album by Mary Chapin Carpenter
- Released: June 12, 2012
- Length: 58:12
- Label: Zoë
- Producer: Mary Chapin Carpenter; Matt Rollings

Mary Chapin Carpenter chronology
The Age of Miracles (2010)	Ashes and Roses (2012)	Songs from the Movie (2014)

Ashes and Roses is the 12th studio album by American singer-songwriter Mary Chapin Carpenter, released on June 12, 2012 by Zoë Records, her fourth album released under the Zoë label.

Produced by Carpenter and Matt Rollings, the album contains 13 original songs written by Carpenter on the standard release, and 14 tracks on the Barnes & Noble exclusive edition.

== Track listing ==
All songs composed by Mary Chapin Carpenter.

1. "Transcendental Reunion" – 4:47
2. "What to Keep and What to Throw Away" – 4:33
3. "The Swords We Carried" – 4:05
4. "Another Home" – 4:29
5. "Chasing What's Already Gone" – 4:57
6. "Learning the World" – 4:30
7. "I Tried Going West" – 4:16
8. "Don't Need Much to Be Happy" – 4:22
9. "Soul Companion" (featuring James Taylor) – 4:00
10. "Old Love" – 4:44
11. "New Year's Day" – 4:56
12. "Fading Away" – 4:19
13. "Jericho" – 4:01

Barnes & Noble exclusive bonus track

14. "The One Who's Not Enough" – 3:28
