= State of the Heart (album) =

Studio album by Mary Chapin Carpenter
- Released: June 13, 1989
- Genre: Country
- Length: 38:21
- Label: Columbia Nashville
- Producers: Mary Chapin Carpenter; John Jennings

Mary Chapin Carpenter chronology
Hometown Girl (1987)	State of the Heart (1989)	Shooting Straight in the Dark (1990)

Singles from State of the Heart
- 1. "How Do" Released: April 15, 1989; 2. "Never Had It So Good" Released: September 2, 1989; 3. "Quittin' Time" Released: January 6, 1990; 4. "Something of a Dreamer" Released: June 16, 1990

Professional ratings
Review scores
Source	Rating
Allmusic	3/5 stars
Chicago Tribune	3/4 stars
Q	3/5 stars

State of the Heart is the second studio album by American singer-songwriter Mary Chapin Carpenter, released by Columbia Records on June 13, 1989.

Featuring a more country sound than her debut Hometown Girl (1987), State of the Heart eventually rose to the No. 28 position on the Billboard's Country Albums chart, with four of its tracks finding places within the Hot Country Singles chart. Chronologically, they were "How Do" at No. 19, "Never Had It So Good" at No. 8, "Quittin' Time" at No. 7, and "Something of a Dreamer" at No. 14.

== Track listing ==
All songs written by Mary Chapin Carpenter unless noted.

No.	Title	Writer(s)	Length
1.	"How Do"		2:09
2.	"Something of a Dreamer"		2:56
3.	"Never Had It So Good"	Carpenter, John Jennings	4:04
4.	"Read My Lips"		3:05
5.	"This Shirt"		3:48
6.	"Quittin' Time"	Robb Royer, Roger Linn	3:52
7.	"Down in Mary's Land"		2:27
8.	"Goodbye Again"		4:47
9.	"Too Tired"		2:28
10.	"Slow Country Dance"		4:00
11.	"It Don't Bring You"		4:45
Total length:			38:21

== Credits ==
- Mary Chapin Carpenter, John Jennings – producers
- Bob Dawson – production assistance, recording, mixing
- Ted Jensen – mastering

=== The band ===
- Mary Chapin Carpenter – acoustic guitars, lead & backing vocals
- John Jennings – electric & acoustic guitars, synthesizers, backing vocals, bass ("Too Tired"), piano ("This Shirt")
- Peter "Tex Luigi" Bonta – accordion, keyboards, acoustic guitar ("How Do")
- Jon Carroll – organ, piano, keyboards
- Rico Petrucelli – bass, fretless bass
- Robbie Magruder – drums, percussion

=== Additional personnel ===
- Mike Auldridge – dobro, pedal steel ("Slow Country Dance")
- Tommy Hannum – pedal steel ("How Do")
- Rickie Simpkins – fiddle, mandolin
- Shawn Colvin – backing vocals
- Kim Miller, David Premo, Bruce Myers, Steven Day – string quartet ("Goodbye Again")
- William Zsembery – French horn
- Strings written, arranged & conducted by Rico Petrucelli

== Charts ==
=== Weekly charts ===
Chart (1989–1990)	Peak position
US Billboard 200	183
US Top Country Albums (Billboard)	28

=== Year-end charts ===
Chart (1990)	Position
US Top Country Albums (Billboard)	38
