= Shut Up and Kiss Me (Mary Chapin Carpenter song) =

Single by Mary Chapin Carpenter

from the album Stones in the Road
- B-side: "End of My Pirate Days"
- Released: August 29, 1994
- Genre: Country
- Length: 3:42
- Label: Columbia
- Songwriter: Mary Chapin Carpenter
- Producers: Mary Chapin Carpenter; John Jennings

Mary Chapin Carpenter singles chronology
| "I Take My Chances" (1994) | "Shut Up and Kiss Me" (1994) | "Tender When I Want to Be" (1994) |

"Shut Up and Kiss Me" is a song written and recorded by American country music artist Mary Chapin Carpenter. It was released in August 1994 as the first single from her album Stones in the Road. The song became her only number one hit on the Billboard Hot Country Singles & Tracks (now Hot Country Songs) charts on November 19, 1994; it also peaked at number 90 on the Billboard Hot 100. The song features Lee Roy Parnell accompanying on slide guitar, Benmont Tench on piano, Don Dixon on bass, Kenny Aronoff on drums, and Trisha Yearwood providing backing vocals. The song also won Carpenter a Grammy Award in 1995 for Best Female Country Vocal Performance.

== Music video ==
The music video was directed by Michael Salomon and premiered in late 1994. It features Carpenter wearing a black shirt and white pants singing the song with a band in a studio, and a resting dog. Parnell also appears in the video doing the guitar solo on a TV monitor.

== Chart positions ==
| Chart (1994) | Peak position |
|---|---|
| Canada Country Singles (RPM) | 3 |
| Scottish Singles Sales (Official Charts) | 18 |
| UK Singles Chart | 35 |
| US Billboard Hot 100 | 90 |
| US Hot Country Songs (Billboard) | 1 |

=== Year-end charts ===
| Chart (1994) | Position |
|---|---|
| Canada Country Tracks (RPM) | 41 |
