= Stones in the Road =

Studio album by Mary Chapin Carpenter
- Released: October 4, 1994
- Genre: Country
- Length: 55:35
- Label: Columbia Nashville
- Producers: Mary Chapin Carpenter; John Jennings

Mary Chapin Carpenter chronology
Come On Come On (1992)	Stones in the Road (1994)	Jubilee: Live at Wolf Trap (1996)

Singles from Stones in the Road
- 1. "Shut Up and Kiss Me" Released: August 29, 1994; 2. "Tender When I Want to Be" Released: December 5, 1994; 3. "House of Cards" Released: March 25, 1995; 4. "Why Walk When You Can Fly?" Released: June 1995

Professional ratings
Review scores
Source	Rating
AllMusic	link
Chicago Tribune	link
Entertainment Weekly	B link
Los Angeles Times	link
Q	link

Stones in the Road is the fifth studio album by American singer-songwriter Mary Chapin Carpenter, released by Columbia Records on October 4, 1994. It became Carpenter's first album to reach No. 1 on the Billboard Country Albums chart, and first album to reach the top 10 on the Billboard 200, peaking at No. 10. It also contains her first No. 1 Hot Country Singles hit, "Shut Up and Kiss Me", which also reached No. 90 on the Billboard Hot 100. Other charting singles were "Tender When I Want to Be" (No. 6), "House of Cards" (No. 21), and "Why Walk When You Can Fly?" at (No. 45).

The nostalgically themed title track was first recorded by folk singer Joan Baez for her 1992 studio album Play Me Backwards, to whom Carpenter first pitched the song during a joint concert appearance before she recorded it herself. It was also featured in the 1995 film Bye Bye Love. Carpenter earned two Grammy Awards in 1995 for her work on the album: Best Country Album and Best Female Country Vocal Performance (for "Shut Up and Kiss Me"), the fourth straight year she won the latter category. In 2006, Country Universe called it the best Contemporary Country Album of all time.

The track "John Doe No. 24" was based off the story of John Doe Boyd, a Black deaf man who was institutionalized in Illinois for over 40 years and whose true identity is unknown.

== Track listing ==
All tracks are written by Mary Chapin Carpenter.

No.	Title	Length
1.	"Why Walk When You Can Fly?"	3:31
2.	"House of Cards"	3:45
3.	"Stones in the Road"	4:31
4.	"A Keeper for Every Flame"	3:46
5.	"Tender When I Want to Be"	2:54
6.	"Shut Up and Kiss Me"	3:40
7.	"The Last Word"	3:25
8.	"The End of My Pirate Days"	5:02
9.	"John Doe No. 24"	5:44
10.	"Jubilee"	4:36
11.	"Outside Looking In"	4:42
12.	"Where Time Stands Still"	3:40
13.	"This Is Love"	6:19
Total length:		55:35

== Personnel ==
Adapted from Stones in the Road liner notes.

Musicians

- Kenny Aronoff - drums (2, 3, 5, 6, 10, 11, 13), percussion (11, 13)
- Paul Brady - tin whistle (10), background vocals (10)
- J. T. Brown - fretless bass (1, 8), bass guitar (4, 7)
- Mary Chapin Carpenter - vocals; acoustic guitar (all tracks except 12), background vocals (1, 2, 4, 10)
- Jon Carroll - piano (1, 7, 8), accordion (1)
- Shawn Colvin - background vocals (10)
- Don Dixon - bass guitar (2, 3, 5, 6, 10, 11, 13), arco bass (5)
- Stuart Duncan - fiddle (1), mandolin (1)
- John Jennings - electric guitar (2, 4, 5, 7, 13), acoustic guitar (1, 3, 4), baritone guitar (5, 6, 11), background vocals (2, 4, 6), Hammond C-3 organ (4), percussion (4), cowbell (6), plucked piano (8), bass guitar (8), "beach guitar" (10, 13)
- Robbie Magruder - drums (1, 4, 7, 8)
- Branford Marsalis - soprano saxophone (9)
- Alan O'Bryant - background vocals (1)
- Lee Roy Parnell - electric slide guitar (6, 13)
- Matt Rollings - piano (1, 4, 12, 13)
- Steuart Smith - electric guitar (2, 3, 4, 5, 8, 11, 13)
- Benmont Tench - Hammond C-3 organ (2, 3, 11), piano (3, 6, 10, 11, 13)
- Robin and Linda Williams - background vocals (1)
- Trisha Yearwood - background vocals (5, 6)

Production

- Mary Chapin Carpenter - producer
- Dave Chavez - recording assistant
- Bob Dawson - recording, mixing
- Caroline Greyshock - photography
- John Jennings - producer
- Bill Johnson - art direction
- Denny Purcell - mastering
- James Saez - additional recording

== Charts ==
=== Weekly charts ===
Chart (1994)	Peak position
Australian Albums (ARIA Charts)	81
Canadian Albums (RPM)	29
Canadian Country Albums (RPM)	1
US Billboard 200	10
US Top Country Albums (Billboard)	1

=== Year-end charts ===
Chart (1994)	Position
US Top Country Albums (Billboard)	39
Chart (1995)	Position
US Billboard 200	87
US Top Country Albums (Billboard)	13
