= The Dirt and the Stars =

Studio album by Mary Chapin Carpenter
- Released: August 7, 2020
- Recorded: January–February 2020
- Studio: Real World (Box)
- Genre: Americana; country; folk
- Length: 58:29
- Label: Lambent Light
- Producer: Ethan Johns

Mary Chapin Carpenter chronology
Sometimes Just the Sky (2018)	The Dirt and the Stars (2020)	One Night Lonely (2021)

The Dirt and the Stars is the 16th studio album by American singer-songwriter Mary Chapin Carpenter, released by Lambent Light Records on August 7, 2020.

== Background and recording ==
In a press release, Carpenter described the songs on the album as "very personal" and "difficult in some ways, and definitely come from places of pain and self-illumination, but also places of joy, discovery and the rewards of self- knowledge." She wrote the album at her Virginia farmhouse and recorded it at Peter Gabriel's Real World Studios near Bath, England between January and February 2020 prior to lockdowns stemming from the COVID-19 pandemic.

== Critical reception ==
Bob Paxman of Sounds of Nashville gave The Dirt and the Stars a positive review, praising Carpenter for her ability to "[get] her message across with lyrical passages that could easily pass for straight poetry" and the album's cohesiveness that allows the songs to "build with nice opening sequences". Thom Jurek of AllMusic gave the album four out of five stars, highlighting the use of Carpenter's "empathic" band to "erase all boundaries between singer and song", and describing it as one of her standout albums from her entire repertoire. Sam Sodomsky of Pitchfork was similarly positive, giving the album a 7.7 out of 10. He wrote: "Three decades into her career, one of country music’s most reliable and empathetic songwriters offers a profoundly intimate record, full of hushed revelations."

== Track listing ==
All tracks are written by Mary Chapin Carpenter.

No.	Title	Length
1.	"Farther Along and Further In"	4:57
2.	"It's Ok to be Sad"	5:05
3.	"All Broken Hearts Break Differently"	4:42
4.	"Old D-35"	5:55
5.	"American Stooge"	6:05
6.	"Where the Beauty Is"	3:51
7.	"Nocturne"	6:16
8.	"Secret Keepers"	3:23
9.	"Asking for a Friend"	5:13
10.	"Everybody's Got Something"	5:19
11.	"Between the Dirt and the Stars"	7:43
Total length:		58:29

Vinyl-only bonus tracks
No.	Title	Length
12.	"Traveler's Prayer"	5:09
13.	"Our Man Walter Cronkite"	3:45
Total length:		67:23

Spotify, iTunes and Apple Music bonus tracks
No.	Title	Length
12.	"Our Man Walter Cronkite"	3:44
13.	"Traveler's Prayer"	5:09
Total length:		67:23

== Personnel ==
Credits adapted from the vinyl edition's liner notes and track listing.

- Mary Chapin Carpenter – vocals, acoustic guitar (all tracks); co-production (track 13)
- Ethan Johns – production (all tracks), Continuum (1, 7), mandolin (1, 10), electric guitar (2, 3, 5, 8), percussion (2, 5, 6, 8)
- Dom Monks – engineering, mixing
- Matt Colton – mastering
- Jeremy Stacey – drums (1–3, 5–8, 10, 11), percussion (3), hand chimes (4)
- Nick Pini – electric bass (1, 5, 6, 8, 11), double bass (2–4, 7, 9, 10); Fender Bass VI, Moog (3)
- Matt Rollings – piano (all tracks), Hammond organ (2, 5, 6, 11)
- Duke Levine – electric guitar (all tracks), 12-string acoustic guitar (2), mandolin (10)
- Jamie Mefford – co-production (12)
- Aaron Farrington – photography
- Chris Tetzeli – photography
- Mark Berger – package layout

== Chart performance ==
Chart performance for The Dirt and the Stars
Chart (2020)	Peak position
US Independent Albums (Billboard)	43
US Folk Albums (Billboard)	6
US Top Country Albums (Billboard)	35
US Top Album Sales (Billboard)	14
UK Independent Albums (OCC)	7
UK Americana Albums (OCC)	2
