= Something of a Dreamer =

Single by Mary Chapin Carpenter

from the album State of the Heart
- B-side: "Slow Country Dance"
- Released: June 16, 1990
- Genre: Country
- Length: 2:56
- Label: Columbia
- Songwriter: Mary Chapin Carpenter
- Producers: John Jennings, Mary Chapin Carpenter

Mary Chapin Carpenter singles chronology
"Quittin' Time" (1990)	"Something of a Dreamer" (1990)	"You Win Again" (1990)

"Something of a Dreamer" is a song written and recorded by American country music artist Mary Chapin Carpenter. It was released in June 1990 as the fourth single from the album State of the Heart. The song reached #14 on the Billboard Hot Country Singles & Tracks chart.

== Chart performance ==
Chart (1990)	Peak position
Canada Country Singles (RPM)	8
US Hot Country Songs (Billboard)	14
