= Never Had It So Good =

Single by Mary Chapin Carpenter

from the album State of the Heart
- B-side: "Other Streets and Other Towns"
- Released: September 2, 1989
- Genre: Country
- Length: 4:05
- Label: Columbia
- Songwriters: Mary Chapin Carpenter, John Jennings
- Producers: Mary Chapin Carpenter, John Jennings

Mary Chapin Carpenter singles chronology
"How Do" (1989)	"Never Had It So Good" (1989)	"Quittin' Time" (1990)

"Never Had It So Good" is a song co-written and recorded by American country music artist Mary Chapin Carpenter. It was released in September 1989 as the second single from the album State of the Heart. The song reached #8 on the Billboard Hot Country Singles & Tracks chart. Carpenter wrote and produced the song with John Jennings.

== Content ==
The song is about a relationship with Carpenter's ex-boyfriend at the time, telling him that he "never had it so good" now that he is in another relationship. Carpenter said of the song, "when I wrote it, I had no idea it would wind up on the radio. Neither did he."

== Critical reception ==
An uncredited review in Cashbox was favorable toward the song, stating that "This cut brings out Carpenter’s distinct vocals like never before and lets us know just how beautifully she can handle a tune guaranteed to conquer radio airplay. 'Never Had It So Good'[...]expresses the true contentment within a relationship—and rising star Carpenter has never sounded so good."

== Chart performance ==
Chart (1989)	Peak position
Canada Country Singles (RPM)	6
US Hot Country Songs (Billboard)	8

=== Year-end charts ===
Chart (1989)	Position
Canada Country Tracks (RPM)	70
