= How Do =

Single by Mary Chapin Carpenter

from the album State of the Heart
- B-side: "It Don't Bring You"
- Released: April 15, 1989
- Genre: Country
- Length: 2:09
- Label: Columbia
- Songwriter: Mary Chapin Carpenter
- Producers: John Jennings, Mary Chapin Carpenter

Mary Chapin Carpenter singles chronology
"Just Because" (1988)	"How Do" (1989)	"Never Had It So Good" (1989)

"How Do" is a song written and recorded by American country music artist Mary Chapin Carpenter. It was released in April 1989 as the first single from the album State of the Heart. The song reached #19 on the Billboard Hot Country Singles & Tracks chart.

== Content ==
"How Do" is described by an uncredited article in The Tennessean as "portray[ing] a woman who has set her sights on entertaining a man who's obviously new in town". The same publication also stated that the song contained numerous electric guitar and steel guitar fills.

== Chart performance ==
Chart (1989)	Peak position
Canada Country Singles (RPM)	44
US Hot Country Songs (Billboard)	19
