= Between Here and Gone =

Studio album by Mary Chapin Carpenter
- Released: April 27, 2004
- Recorded: August–December 2003
- Genre: Country
- Label: Columbia Nashville
- Producer: Mary Chapin Carpenter; Matt Rollings

Mary Chapin Carpenter chronology
| The Essential Mary Chapin Carpenter (2003) | Between Here and Gone (2004) | The Calling (2007) |

Professional ratings
Aggregate scores
| Source | Rating |
|---|---|
| Metacritic | (71/100) |
Review scores
| Source | Rating |
| About.com | 5/5 stars |
| AllMusic | 4/5 stars |
| Blender | 3.5/5 stars |
| Entertainment Weekly | B+ |
| People | 2/4 stars |
| Q | 2/5 stars |

Between Here and Gone is the eighth studio album by American singer-songwriter Mary Chapin Carpenter, released by Columbia Nashville on April 27, 2004. It reached No. 5 on Billboard's Top Country Albums chart, although the album itself produced no chart singles. The title track was written by Carpenter upon hearing of the death of singer-songwriter Dave Carter.

This was Carpenter's last studio album on Columbia Records Nashville.

== Track listing ==
All songs written by Mary Chapin Carpenter

1. "What Would You Say to Me" – 3:43
2. "Luna's Gone" – 4:16
3. "My Heaven" – 5:53
4. "Goodnight America" – 5:36
5. "Between Here and Gone" – 5:08
6. "One Small Heart" – 6:02
7. "Beautiful Racket" – 4:40
8. "Girls Like Me" – 4:27
9. "River" – 4:21
10. "Grand Central Station" – 4:25
11. "The Shelter of Storms" – 5:18
12. "Elysium" – 5:29

Barnes & Noble Limited Edition (Bonus CD)

Live acoustic performance from the Singer/Songwriter tour, October 2003:

1. "I Still Miss Someone" (live) – 5.17
2. "This Shirt" (live) – 5.08
3. "Late for Your Life" (live) – 4:57

Borders Limited Edition (Bonus DVD)

1. "Down at the Twist and Shout" (music video)
2. "I Feel Lucky" (music video)
3. "Shut Up and Kiss Me" (music video)
4. "The Better to Dream of You" (music video)
5. "Almost Home" (music video)

== Personnel ==
- David Angell - violin
- Richard Bennett - electric guitar
- Mary Chapin Carpenter - acoustic guitar, Leslie guitar, lead vocals, background vocals
- Chad Cromwell - drums
- Eric Darken - percussion
- Dan Dugmore - steel guitar
- Stuart Duncan - fiddle
- Shannon Forrest - drums
- Rob Ickes - dobro
- John Jennings - acoustic guitar
- Viktor Krauss - bass guitar
- Anthony LaMarchina - cello
- Russ Powell - acoustic guitar
- Jerry McPherson - electric guitar
- Tim O'Brien - mandolin
- Dean Parks - electric guitar
- Matt Rollings - keyboards
- Garrison Starr - background vocals
- Mary Kathryn Van Osdale - viola
- Kristin Wilkinson - string arrangements, viola
- Glenn Worf - bass guitar

== Chart performance ==
| Chart (1989–1990) | Peak position |
|---|---|
| US Billboard 200 | 50 |
| US Top Country Albums (Billboard) | 5 |
