= Let Me into Your Heart =

Single by Mary Chapin Carpenter

from the album A Place in the World
- Released: September 23, 1996
- Genre: Country
- Length: 2:54
- Label: Columbia
- Songwriter: Mary Chapin Carpenter
- Producers: John Jennings, Mary Chapin Carpenter

Mary Chapin Carpenter singles chronology
"Why Walk When You Can Fly" (1995)	"Let Me into Your Heart" (1996)	"I Want to Be Your Girlfriend" (1997)

"Let Me into Your Heart" is a song written and recorded by American country music artist Mary Chapin Carpenter. It was released in September 1996 as the first single from the album A Place in the World. The song reached number 11 on the Billboard Hot Country Singles & Tracks chart and number 5 on the RPM Country Tracks in Canada.

== Music video ==
The music video was directed by Steven Goldmann and premiered in September 1996 and featured guest Bill Irwin as the romantic interest.

== Chart performance ==
Chart (1996–1997)	Peak position
Australia (ARIA)	163
Canada Country Singles (RPM)	5
US Hot Country Songs (Billboard)	11
