= Quittin' Time =

Single by Mary Chapin Carpenter

from the album State of the Heart
- B-side: "Heroes and Heroines"
- Released: January 6, 1990
- Genre: Country
- Length: 3:52
- Label: Columbia
- Songwriters: Robb Royer, Roger Linn
- Producers: Mary Chapin Carpenter, John Jennings

Mary Chapin Carpenter singles chronology
"Never Had It So Good" (1989)	"Quittin' Time" (1990)	"Something of a Dreamer" (1990)

"Quittin' Time" is a song written by Robb Royer and Roger Linn, and recorded by American country music artist Mary Chapin Carpenter. It was released in January 1990 as the third single from the album State of the Heart. The song reached No. 7 on the Billboard Hot Country Singles & Tracks chart.

== Content ==
The song is about a relationship that has failed, with the narrator describing the end of the relationship as "quittin' time".

== Critical reception ==
A review in Billboard was positive, stating that the song was "A spirited but rueful acknowledgment of love gone stale" and had a "clean, insistent instrumental sound" similar in concept to its predecessor, "Never Had It So Good".

== Chart performance ==
Chart (1990)	Peak position
Canada Country Singles (RPM)	8
US Hot Country Songs (Billboard)	7

=== Year-end charts ===
Chart (1990)	Position
Canada Country Tracks (RPM)	83
US Country Songs (Billboard)	70

== Other Treatments ==
Lou Ann Barton was performing this song in her shows in the mid 1980s. Barton recorded a version for her 1986 album Forbidden Tones.
