= House of Cards (Mary Chapin Carpenter song) =

Single by Mary Chapin Carpenter

from the album Stones in the Road
- B-side: "Jubilee"
- Released: March 25, 1995
- Genre: Country
- Length: 3:45
- Label: Columbia
- Songwriter(s): Mary Chapin Carpenter
- Producer(s): John Jennings; Mary Chapin Carpenter

Mary Chapin Carpenter singles chronology
"Tender When I Want to Be" (1994)	"House of Cards" (1995)	"Why Walk When You Can Fly" (1995)

"House of Cards" is a song written and recorded by American country music artist Mary Chapin Carpenter. it was released in March 1995 as the third single from the album Stones in the Road. The song reached #21 on the Billboard Hot Country Singles & Tracks chart.

== Content ==
The narrator sings of growing up in a small home in a small community, reflecting on knowing the “groan of every stair” in the house and the “name of every street” in the town. She reflects that while these small communities and homes seem perfect and ideal to an outsider, they hide their own secrets and perils, and that everyone’s greatest fear is that their “house of cards” will be discovered and everything will crash down around them.

== Music video ==
The music video begins by showing a family smiling happily for a family photo. Once the photo is taken, the façade falls away and the fighting, despair, and turmoil of the family is revealed. The father is an alcoholic who is buried in his work and talking to a mistress on the phone, the mother is mentally overwhelmed trying to hold up the image of her "perfect" family and chain smokes as a way to escape her reality as she works on a stack of Christmas cards. The older child struggles with beauty and self-esteem issues, while the younger child, feeling like he is caught in the crossfire of the family turmoil, retreats to the attic of the home, where he builds a large house of playing cards which in the end crashes to the ground.

== Personnel ==
- Kenny Aronoff – drums
- Mary Chapin Carpenter – lead and background vocals, acoustic guitar
- Don Dixon – bass guitar
- John Jennings – electric guitar, background vocals
- Steuart Smith – electric guitar
- Benmont Tench – Hammond C-3 organ

== Chart performance ==
Chart (1995)	Peak position
US Hot Country Songs (Billboard)	21
Canadian RPM Country Tracks	22
