= Hometown Girl (album) =

Studio album by Mary Chapin Carpenter
- Released: July 30, 1987
- Genre: Country
- Length: 42:21
- Label: Columbia
- Producers: Steve Buckingham; John Jennings

Mary Chapin Carpenter chronology
| Hometown Girl (1987) | State of the Heart (1989) |

Alternative cover

Professional ratings
Review scores
| Source | Rating |
|---|---|
| AllMusic | 2.5/5 stars |

Hometown Girl is the debut album from American singer-songwriter Mary Chapin Carpenter. It was released on July 30, 1987 (see 1987 in country music) on Columbia Records. The album did not produce any chart singles. It was produced by John Jennings, except for the track "Come On Home", which was produced by Steve Buckingham.

Vik Iyengar of AllMusic gave the album a two-and-a-half star rating out of five, saying that although "her songwriting skills are apparent" on the album, it did not contain as many "rollicking" tunes as Carpenter's following albums. The Washington Post gave it a more favorable review, praising the songs that Carpenter wrote.

Initially, Carpenter intended to include the John Stewart song "Runaway Train" on this album. Her version did not make the final cut, and was instead recorded by Rosanne Cash on her 1987 album King's Record Shop.

== Track listing ==
All songs written by Mary Chapin Carpenter unless noted.

1. "A Lot Like Me" – 4:37
2. "Other Streets and Other Towns" – 5:00
3. "Hometown Girl" – 4:53
4. "Downtown Train" (Tom Waits) – 4:10
5. "Family Hands" – 4:34
6. "A Road Is Just a Road" (Carpenter, John Jennings) – 3:11
7. "Come On Home" (Pat Bunch, Mary Ann Kennedy, Pam Rose) – 3:17
8. "Waltz" – 3:24
9. "Just Because" – 4:58
10. "Heroes and Heroines" – 4:46

== Personnel ==
As listed in liner notes.

- Steve Buckingham — acoustic guitar
- Mary Chapin Carpenter — acoustic guitar, vocals
- Jon Carroll — piano, Cream of Wheat can
- Jonathan Edwards — background vocals, harmonica
- John Jennings — acoustic guitar, electric guitar, mandolin, synthesizer, castanets, piano, fretless bass, background vocals
- Robbie Magruder — drums, percussion
- Mark O'Connor — fiddle, mandolin, mandola
- Rico Petruccelli — bass guitar, vibraphone
- Tony Rice — acoustic guitar
- Mike Stein — fiddle
- Scott Young — oboe

== Charts ==
| Chart (1987–1992) | Peak position |
|---|---|
| Australian Albums (ARIA) | 178 |
