= Tender When I Want to Be =

Single by Mary Chapin Carpenter

from the album Stones in the Road
- B-side: "John Doe No 24"
- Released: December 5, 1994
- Genre: Country
- Length: 2:54
- Label: Columbia
- Songwriter: Mary Chapin Carpenter
- Producers: Mary Chapin Carpenter; John Jennings

Mary Chapin Carpenter singles chronology
"Shut Up and Kiss Me" (1994)	"Tender When I Want to Be" (1994)	"House of Cards" (1995)

"Tender When I Want to Be" is a song written and recorded by American country music artist Mary Chapin Carpenter. It was released in December 1994 as the second single from her album Stones in the Road. The song reached number 6 on the Billboard Hot Country Singles & Tracks chart in February 1995.

== Critical reception ==
Deborah Evans Price, of Billboard magazine reviewed the song favorably, calling it a "think-while-you-dance pop/country tune about grown-up emotions." She goes on to say that Carpenter continues to "light up country radio with incisive, intelligent lyrics and a talent for creating just the right melody."

== Music video ==
The music video was directed by Michael Salomon and premiered in early 1995.

== Personnel ==
- Kenny Aronoff–drums
- Mary Chapin Carpenter–lead vocals, acoustic guitar
- Don Dixon–bass guitar, arco bass
- John Jennings–electric guitar, baritone guitar
- Steuart Smith–electric guitar
- Trisha Yearwood–background vocals

== Chart performance ==
"Tender When I Want to Be" debuted at number 59 on the U.S. Billboard Hot Country Singles & Tracks for the week of December 10, 1994.

Chart (1994–1995)	Peak position
Canada Country Singles (RPM)	2
US Hot Country Songs (Billboard)	6

=== Year-end charts ===
Chart (1995)	Position
Canada Country Tracks (RPM)	44
