= Looking for the Thread =

Studio album by Mary Chapin Carpenter, Julie Fowlis, and Karine Polwart
- Released: January 24, 2025
- Recorded: 2024
- Studio: Real World (Box)
- Length: 47:28
- Label: Lambent Light Records; Thirty Tigers
- Producer: Josh Kaufman

Mary Chapin Carpenter chronology
One Night Lonely (2021)	Looking for the Thread (2025)	Personal History (2025)

Julie Fowlis chronology
Allt: Volume II Cuimhne (2024)	Looking for the Thread (2025)

Karine Polwart chronology
Still as Your Sleeping (2021)	Looking for the Thread (2025)

Looking for the Thread is a collaborative studio album by American singer-songwriter Mary Chapin Carpenter and Scottish musicians Julie Fowlis and Karine Polwart. It was released on January 24, 2025, by Lambent Light Records with distribution by Thirty Tigers.

The album was preceded by the release of two singles. The first single, "Hold Everything", was released on November 24, 2024. The second single, "A Heart That Never Closes", was released on January 10, 2025.

== Background and recording ==
Carpenter first reached out to Fowlis and Polwart in hopes of helping her with an album in 2022 before subsequently meeting together in Northern Scotland for two writing sessions in which eventuated in the recording of what would become Looking for the Thread in early 2024; it was recorded at the Real World Studios in Box, England. Of the recording process, Polwart said in a press release that the musicians who contributed to the album were attentive to the music at the time of recording, adding that the songs were not "pre-produced to within an inch of their lives".

== Critical reception ==
Upon release, Looking for the Thread received positive acclaim from critics. Lyndon Bolton of Folk Alley wrote: "[Mary Chapin] Carpenter's rich, empathetic American folk blends beautifully with the Scots, [Julie] Fowlis and [Karine] Polwart, who add their own traditional and contemporary styles." Mike Davies of KLOF Magazine opined that the album "offers a captivating meeting of different but kindred musical minds from different genres and cultures coming seamlessly together with shared themes and emotions".

== Track listing ==
Looking for the Thread track listing
No.	Title	Writer(s)	Length
1.	"Gràdh Geal Mo Chridhe"	Cameron Ralston; Chris Vatalaro; Josh Kaufman; Julie Fowlis; Rob Burger	4:26
2.	"A Heart That Never Closes"	Mary Chapin Carpenter	5:02
3.	"Rebecca"	Karine Polwart	3:52
4.	"Looking for the Thread"	Carpenter	5:22
5.	"Hold Everything"	Polwart	5:10
6.	"Silver in the Blue"	Fowlis	4:16
7.	"You Know Where You Are"	Polwart; Pippa Murphy	5:08
8.	"Satellite"	Carpenter	4:50
9.	"Buidheann Mo Chridhe Clann Ualrig"	Fowlis	4:04
10.	"Send Love"	Carpenter	5:10
Total length:			47:28

== Personnel ==
Credits adapted from the album's liner notes.

- Mary Chapin Carpenter – vocals, acoustic guitar
- Julie Fowlis – vocals, whistle
- Karine Polwart – vocals, acoustic guitar, tenor guitar, 12-string guitar
- Josh Kaufman – baritone guitar, electric guitar, nylon guitar, keyboards, production
- Rob Burger – piano, organ, accordion
- Cameron Ralston – acoustic bass, electric bass
- Chris Vatalaro – drums, percussion
- Caoimhín Ó Raghallaigh – hardanger d'amore
- D. James Goodwin – engineering, mixing, mastering
- Katie May – engineering assistance
- Gillian O'Mara – cover art
- Mark Berger – art direction, design

== Chart performance ==
Chart performance for Looking for the Thread
Chart	Peak position
Scottish Albums (OCC)	9
UK Americana Albums (OCC)	6
UK Independent Albums (OCC)	8
