= Personal History (album) =

2025 studio album by Mary Chapin Carpenter

Studio album by Mary Chapin Carpenter
- Released: June 6, 2025
- Studio: Real World
- Genre: Country folk
- Labels: Lambent Light Records; Thirty Tigers
- Producer: Josh Kaufman

Mary Chapin Carpenter chronology
Looking for the Thread (2025)	Personal History (2025)

Personal History is the 17th studio album by American singer-songwriter Mary Chapin Carpenter, released on June 6, 2025, by Lambent Light Records with distribution by Thirty Tigers.

== Critical reception ==
Mark Deming of AllMusic gave Personal History four out of five stars, calling it a "triumph, offering an unguarded look into her heart and her soul." Henry Carrigan of Folk Alley stated: "It may be her best album yet, and it is certainly one of the best albums of the year so far."

== Track listing ==
All songs written by Mary Chapin Carpenter.

No.	Title	Length
1.	"What Did You Miss"	5:00
2.	"Paint + Turpentine"	3:40
3.	"New Religion"	4:23
4.	"Girl And Her Dog"	5:00
5.	"The Saving Things"	4:54
6.	"Hello My Name Is"	6:10
7.	"Bitter Ender"	3:28
8.	"The Night We Never Met"	3:32
9.	"Home Is A Song" (ft. Anaïs Mitchell)	4:06
10.	"Say It Anyway"	3:43
11.	"Coda"	4:48

== Charts ==
Weekly chart performance for Personal History
Chart (2025)	Peak position
Scottish Albums (Official Charts)	89
UK Americana Albums (OCC)	4
UK Country Albums (Official Charts)	1
