= The Things That We Are Made Of =

Studio album by Mary Chapin Carpenter
- Released: May 6, 2016
- Recorded: Spring and Summer 2015
- Genre: Americana
- Length: 48:49
- Label: Lambent Light Records
- Producer: Dave Cobb

Mary Chapin Carpenter chronology
Songs from the Movie (2014)	The Things That We Are Made Of (2016)	Sometimes Just the Sky (2018)

The Things That We Are Made Of is the 14th studio album by American singer-songwriter Mary Chapin Carpenter, released by Lambent Light Records on May 6, 2016. The album was produced by Dave Cobb.

== Background ==
Carpenter recorded The Things That We Are Made Of at Dave Cobb's Low Country Sound studio in Nashville, Tennessee; production was helmed by Cobb. She began writing the material for the album about four years prior, and described the writing process as similar to those of her previous works in an interview with Diane Rehm: "[W]henever I've started a record, I haven't really had, like, a topic or an agenda or anything to sort of stitch the songs together. They just kind of come out. And when I finished the writing for [The Things That We Are Made Of], I was able to sort of see it as one thing and it really was this sort of document of where I am in my life, what this age that I'm at is bringing to me, [and] what I have lost along the way." In another interview with HuffPost, Carpenter said that the album's songs "poses questions at every verse", further adding that "What I was trying to articulate is that duality, two sides of ourselves that want to be unanswerable but also want that deep connection and safety. How to reconcile those two things? The song "Something Tamed Something Wild" poses that question and those conversations run through the record."

== Critical reception ==
Professional ratings
Review scores
Source	Rating
AllMusic	4/5 stars
Pitchfork	6.8/10

Upon release, The Things We Are Made Of received mixed reviews from music critics. Benjamin Naddaff-Hafrey of NPR called the album "surprising", however he praised Dave Cobb's production for "stripping Carpenter's arrangements back" in contrast to her previous album Songs from the Movie (2014). He also wrote: "In the process, she makes you believe that the lucky end of the stories we tell ourselves is the ability to look through memories and find real acceptance — the things we're made of and the strength to set off again."

== Track listing ==
All tracks are written by Mary Chapin Carpenter.

No.	Title	Length
1.	"Something Tamed Something Wild"	3:46
2.	"The Middle Ages"	3:48
3.	"What Does It Mean to Travel"	3:09
4.	"Livingston"	5:13
5.	"Map of My Heart"	2:57
6.	"Oh Rosetta"	4:39
7.	"Deep Deep Down Heart"	4:34
8.	"Hand on My Back"	5:14
9.	"The Blue Distance"	5:04
10.	"Note on a Windshield"	4:49
11.	"The Things That We Are Made Of"	5:30
Total length:		48:49

Digital bonus tracks
No.	Title	Length
12.	"Between the Wars (Charleston 1937)"	4:03
13.	"88 Constellations"	5:00
Total length:		57:52

== Personnel ==
Credits for The Things That We Are Made Of adapted from AllMusic.

Musicians

- Mary Chapin Carpenter - vocals, acoustic guitar, electric guitar
- Dave Cobb - acoustic guitar, electric guitar, gut string guitar, mellotoron, moog, percussion, synthesizer
- Brian Allen - bass
- Annie Clements - bass
- Eamon McLoughlin - strings
- Chris Powell - drums, percussion
- Jimmy Walace - hammond B3, piano
- Mike Webb - fender rhodes, hammond B3, mellotron, piano, reed organ

Technical

- Dave Cobb - production, mixing
- Pete Lyman - mastering engineer
- Eamon McLoughlin - strings engineer
- Matt Ross-Spang - engineering, mixing
- Mike Stankiewicz - assistant engineering

Design

- Aaron Farrington - photography
- Kit Peltzel - artwork design
- Lisa Wright - artwork design

== Chart performance ==
Chart performance for The Things That We Are Made Of
Chart (2016)	Peak position
UK Albums (OCC)	47
UK Americana Albums (OCC)	3
US Billboard 200	103
US Top Country Albums (Billboard)	8
US Americana/Folk Albums (Billboard)	3
US Independent Albums (Billboard)	4
US Top Album Sales (Billboard)	42
