= Songs from the Movie =

Studio album by Mary Chapin Carpenter
- Released: January 14, 2014
- Recorded: 2013
- Studios: AIR Studios, London, England, United Kingdom
- Genre: Country
- Length: 52:18
- Language: English
- Labels: Zoë (North America); Decca/Rounder (Europe)
- Producers: Mary Chapin Carpenter; Vince Mendoza; Matt Rollings

Mary Chapin Carpenter chronology
Ashes and Roses (2012)	Songs from the Movie (2014)	The Things That We Are Made Of (2016)

Songs from the Movie is the 13th studio album by American singer-songwriter Mary Chapin Carpenter, released by Zoë Records on January 14, 2014. The album is orchestral music re-recordings of her songs, guided by American composer Vince Mendoza. It has received positive reviews from critics.

== Recording and release ==
According to the review aggregator Metacritic, Songs from the Movie received "" based on a weighted average score of four out of 100 from generally positive critic scores. After this album's 2014 release, she performed selections from it with the BBC Scottish Symphony Orchestra at the Celtic Connections festival in Glasgow, Scotland, as well as select performances with domestic orchestras. In 2014, Carpenter's touring schedule included a mix of orchestral performances comprising selections from Songs from the Movie, as well as acoustic sets featuring Jon Carroll, multi-instrumentalist John Doyle, and opening act Tift Merritt. To select the songs, Carpenter collaborated with co-producers Mendoza and Matt Rollings, whittling down a list of songs that were lyrically challenging and told complex stories from throughout her recording career.

== Reception ==
The editorial staff of AllMusic named this the "Best of 2014" and scored it 3.5 out of five stars, with reviewer Thom Jurek noting Carpenter's diverse influences outside of country music and noted how she has "remained vital, productive, and has a track record of consistency most artists would—or at least should—envy" and opining that Mendoza was able to complement her voice with the performers to make an album that is "an almost painterly soundtrack" to Carpenter's life and work. Writing for Country Standard Time, Jeffrey B. Remz thought the album needed "a bit more energy" and "veers decidedly towards the precious and pretty side, but sometimes a bit too much so." The Guardian's Robin Deneslow scored Songs from the Movie three out of five stars, calling the experiment a "brave reworking" of her songs that sometimes has the instrumentation overwhelm the songwriting. Nick Coleman of The Independent scored this album two out of five stars, opining that the compositions are good songs by Carpenter, but that they are "fluffed up massively in a compressed space like this, also a rather stifling one".

== Track listing ==
All songs written by Mary Chapin Carpenter

1. "On and On It Goes" – 4:26
2. "I Am a Town" – 5:01
3. "Between Here and Gone" – 5:06
4. "Ideas Are Like Stars" – 4:17
5. "The Dreaming Road" – 5:47
6. "Only a Dream" – 5:56
7. "Come On Come On" – 5:30
8. "Mrs. Hemingway" – 6:21
9. "Where Time Stands Still" – 3:46
10. "Goodnight America" – 6:08

== Personnel ==
- Mary Chapin Carpenter – vocals, production
- Dave Arch – piano
- Chuck Ainsley – mixing at Sound Stage Studios
- John Badbury – violin
- Mark Berrow – violin
- Richard Berry – horn
- Rachel Bolt – viola
- Thomas Bowes – violin
- Jon Carnac – first clarinet
- David Chatterton – bassoon
- Luis Conte – percussion on "Goodnight America"
- Dave Daniels – cello
- Yona Dunsford – choir metro voice
- Philip Eastop – horn
- Liz Edwards – violin
- Richard Edwards – tenor trombone
- Peter Erskine – percussion on "On and On It Goes", "I Am a Town", "Between Here and Gone", "Ideas Are Like Stars", "The Dreaming Road", "Only a Dream", "Come On Come On", and "Goodnight America"
- Jonathan Evans-Jones – violin
- Alice Fearn – choir metro voice
- Joanna Forbes – choir metro voice
- Soophia Foroughi – choir metro voice
- Dave Fuest – clarinet
- Roger Garland – violin
- Alex Gibson – choir metro voice
- Caitlyn Gordon – choir metro voice
- Russ Harrington – interior photography
- Bill Hawkes – viola
- Claire Henry – choir metro voice
- Mike Hext – first tenor trombone
- Eloise Irving – choir metro voice
- Garfield Jackson – viola
- Leah Jackson – choir metro voice
- Karen Jones – first flute and alto flute
- Skaila Kanga – harp
- Helen Keen – flute and alto flute
- Paul Kegg – cello
- Nikki Kennedy – choir metro voice
- Gary Kettel – percussion
- Mike Kidd – horn
- Patrick Kiernan – violin
- Boguslaw Kostecki – violin
- Peter Lale – first viola
- Patrick Lannigan – bass
- Chris Laurence – stand-up rhythm
- Julian Leaper – violin
- Anthony Lewis – cello
- Martin Loveday – cello
- Bob Ludwig – mastering at Gateway Mastering
- Richard Macintyre – cover photography
- Steve Mair – bass
- Rita Manning – violin
- Jane Marshall – oboe
- Oren Marshall – tuba
- Stephen Maw – contra bassoon
- Dani May – choir metro voice
- Polly May – choir metro voice
- Vince Mendoza – orchestra arrangements, conducting, production
- Chloe Morgan – choir metro voice
- Kate Musker – viola
- Everton Nelson – violin
- Anna Noakes – flute and alto flute
- Abbie Osmon – choir metro voice
- Andy Parker – viola
- Chris Parkes – first horn
- Tom Pearce – choir master
- Tom Pigott-Smith – violin
- Anthony Pleeth – first cello
- Maciej Rakowski – violin
- Jonathan Rees – violin
- Frank Ricotti – first percussion
- George Robertson – viola
- Matt Rollings – additional piano on "Goodnight America", production
- Frank Schaefer – cello
- Emlyn Singleton – violin
- Richard Skinner – first bassoon
- Dave Stewart – bass trombone
- David Theodore – oboe
- Cathy Thompson – violin
- Chris Tombling – violin
- Rebecca Trehearn – choir metro voice
- Michael Valerio – acoustic bass on "On and On It Goes", "I Am a Town", "Between Here and Gone", "Ideas Are Like Stars", "The Dreaming Road", "Only a Dream", "Come On Come On", and "Goodnight America"
- Vicci Wardman – viola
- Stacey Watton – first bass
- Bruce White – viola
- Debbie Widdup – violin
- Paul Willey – violin
- Jonathan Williams – cello
- Dave Woodcock – violin

== See also ==
- List of 2014 albums
