= Mary Chapin Carpenter =

American singer-songwriter (born 1958)

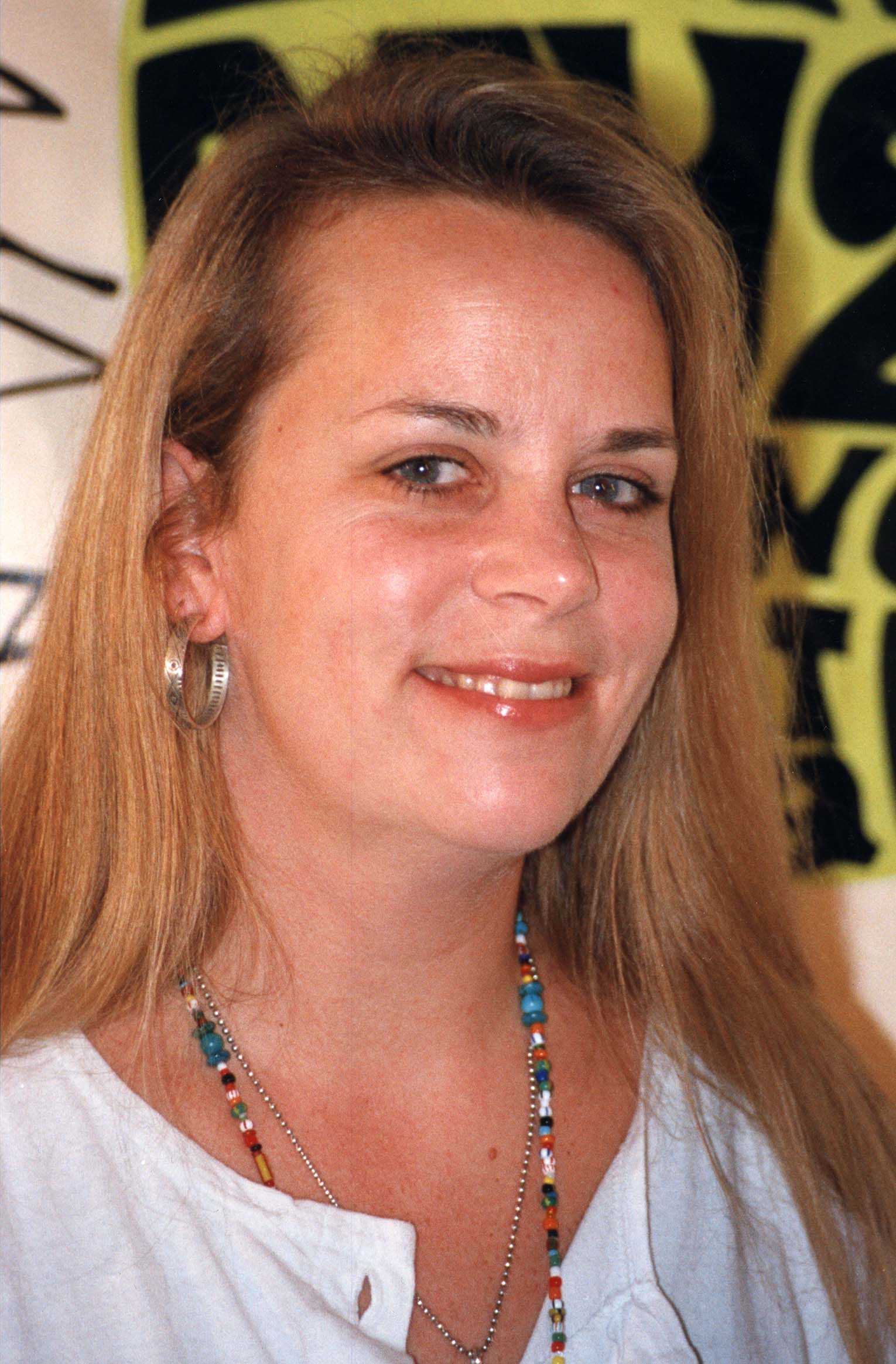
- Carpenter in 1995
- Born: February 21, 1958 (age 68); Princeton, New Jersey, U.S.
- Education: Brown University (BA)
- Occupations: Singer; songwriter
- Awards: Full list
- Musical career
- Genres: Country; folk
- Instruments: Vocals; acoustic guitar
- Works: Mary Chapin Carpenter discography
- Years active: 1987–present
- Labels: Columbia Nashville; Zoë; Lambent Light/Thirty Tigers
- Spouse: Timmy Smith (m. 2002; div. 2010)
- Website: marychapincarpenter.com

Mary Chapin Carpenter (Note: Carpenter's albums spelled her first name "Mary-Chapin" until 1994.) (born February 21, 1958) is an American country and folk music singer-songwriter. Carpenter spent several years singing in Washington, D.C.-area clubs before signing in the late 1980s with Columbia Records. Although her first album, 1987's Hometown Girl, did not produce any charting singles, she broke through with 1989's State of the Heart and 1990's Shooting Straight in the Dark.

Carpenter's most successful album is 1992's Come On Come On, which accounted for seven singles and was certified quadruple platinum in the United States for shipments of four million copies. Follow-up Stones in the Road appeared two years later and won Carpenter the Grammy Award for Best Country Album, while certifying double platinum for shipments of two million copies. After a number of commercially unsuccessful albums throughout the first decade of the 21st century, she exited Columbia for Zoë Records. Her first album for this label was 2007's The Calling. Since leaving Zoë Records in 2015, Carpenter has recorded for her own Lambent Light label, distributed by Thirty Tigers.

Carpenter has won five Grammy Awards, from 18 nominations, including four consecutive wins in the category of Best Female Country Vocal Performance between 1992 and 1995. She has charted 27 times on the Billboard Hot Country Songs charts, with her 1994 single "Shut Up and Kiss Me" reaching number one. Her musical style takes influence from contemporary country and folk, with many of her songs including feminist themes. While largely composed of songs she wrote herself or with longtime producer John Jennings, her discography includes covers of Gene Vincent, Lucinda Williams, and Dire Straits.

== Early life ==
Mary Chapin Carpenter was born February 21, 1958, in Princeton, New Jersey. Her father, Chapin Carpenter Jr., was an executive for Life magazine. When she was 12 years old, the family moved to Tokyo, Japan, and lived there for about two years, as her father was looking to begin an Asian edition of Life. Her mother, Mary Bowie Robertson, was a folk music singer and guitarist. As a child, Carpenter learned to play her mother's ukulele and classical guitar in addition to writing songs. She was also inspired by her seventh-grade science teacher, who was a guitarist as well. After her family moved to Washington, D.C., in 1974, Carpenter played folk venues in the area. She attended Brown University and graduated with a degree in American civilization. She began performing cover songs at the folk venues, but by 1981 she had added original material. She befriended John Jennings, a songwriter, instrumentalist, and record producer. The two began collaborating and put together a demo cassette of several of Carpenter's songs which she sold at concerts.

== Musical career ==
=== 1987–1991: Early years with Columbia Records ===
Jennings had originally planned to sign Carpenter to an independent label, but the owner of a Washington, D.C. nightclub submitted some of Carpenter's demos to a representative of Columbia Records' Nashville division. This led to her signing with that label in 1987, only two days before she was slated to sign the contract with the other independent label. Columbia released her debut album Hometown Girl in 1987. The label hyphenated her first name as "Mary-Chapin" to indicate that it was a compound given name and lessen the possibility of her being referred to as just Mary. Her albums would continue to punctuate her name in this fashion until 1994. Of the ten songs on Hometown Girl, Carpenter wrote or co-wrote eight. The two exceptions were "Come On Home" and a cover of Tom Waits' "Downtown Train". She had also recorded John Stewart's "Runaway Train" with the intent of including it on the album, but Columbia removed this song because Rosanne Cash had also recorded it and wanted to issue it as a single. Jennings played guitar, synthesizer, piano, bass guitar, and mandolin on the album, while Mark O'Connor contributed on fiddle and Tony Rice on acoustic guitar. Musician Jon Carroll played piano and also provided percussion by shaking a Cream of Wheat can. While the album did not produce any charting singles, it received word of mouth attention in folk music circles, which led to her being booked to perform at the Philadelphia Folk Festival in addition to serving as an opening act for Emmylou Harris.

Because of her first album's commercial failure, Carpenter sought to make her next one more appealing to country radio. She charted for the first time in early 1989 with "How Do", which ascended to number 19 on the Billboard Hot Country Songs charts. The song served as the lead single to her second Columbia album, State of the Heart. "Never Had It So Good", a song which Carpenter wrote with Jennings, became her first top-ten country hit by the end of 1989. After it were "Quittin' Time" (co-written by Robb Royer and Roger Linn) and "Something of a Dreamer", which Carpenter wrote by herself. William Ruhlmann of AllMusic thought that Carpenter was "still in transition" between the folk influences of her debut and the more mainstream country sounds of her later albums. She won Top New Female Vocalist from the Academy of Country Music in 1989. At the 33rd Annual Grammy Awards in 1991, "Quittin' Time" was nominated for a Grammy Award for Best Female Country Vocal Performance.

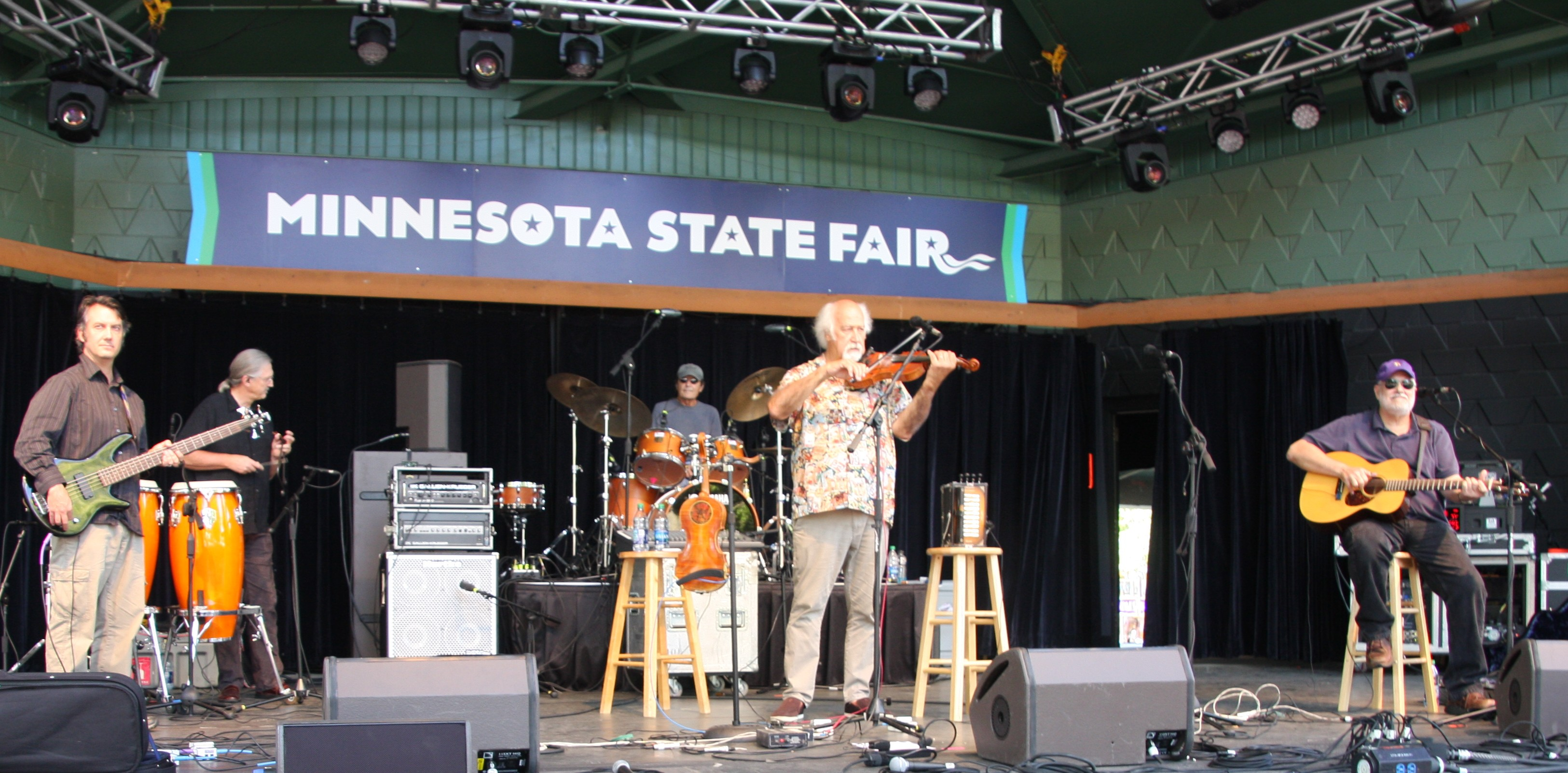
Carpenter's 1991 single "Down at the Twist and Shout" features Cajun band BeauSoleil, pictured in 2016.

Her third Columbia album was 1990's Shooting Straight in the Dark. Its first single release was her own composition "You Win Again". After it was a cover of Gene Vincent and the Blue Caps' "Right Now". Both of these cuts achieved top-20 peaks on Hot Country Songs upon release. "Down at the Twist and Shout", which featured instrumentation from Cajun band BeauSoleil, peaked at number two in 1991. Released last from the album was the top-20 hit "Going Out Tonight". Folk singer Shawn Colvin, a frequent collaborative partner for Carpenter, sang duet vocals on the closing track "The Moon and St. Christopher". Don Dixon played bass guitar and sang backing vocals on the "Right Now" cover, and Matt Rollings contributed on piano. Jennings continued to serve as producer in addition to playing several instruments and contributing backing vocals. Jim Bohen of the Morristown, New Jersey, Daily Record thought that the album was more upbeat than its predecessors, citing "You Win Again" and "Down at the Twist and Shout" as examples. Mike DeGagne of AllMusic thought that the involvements of BeauSoleil and Colvin helped expand Carpenter's sound; he also praised her lyrics on "Halley Came to Jackson" and her vocal delivery on "What You Didn't Say". "Down at the Twist and Shout" accounted for Carpenter's first Grammy Award win in 1992, in the category of Best Female Country Vocal Performance; the song was also nominated that year for Best Country Song. The same year she won Top Female Vocalist from the Academy of Country Music. The Country Music Association (CMA) awarded her Female Vocalist of the Year in both 1992 and 1993.

=== 1992–1995: Come On Come On and Stones in the Road ===
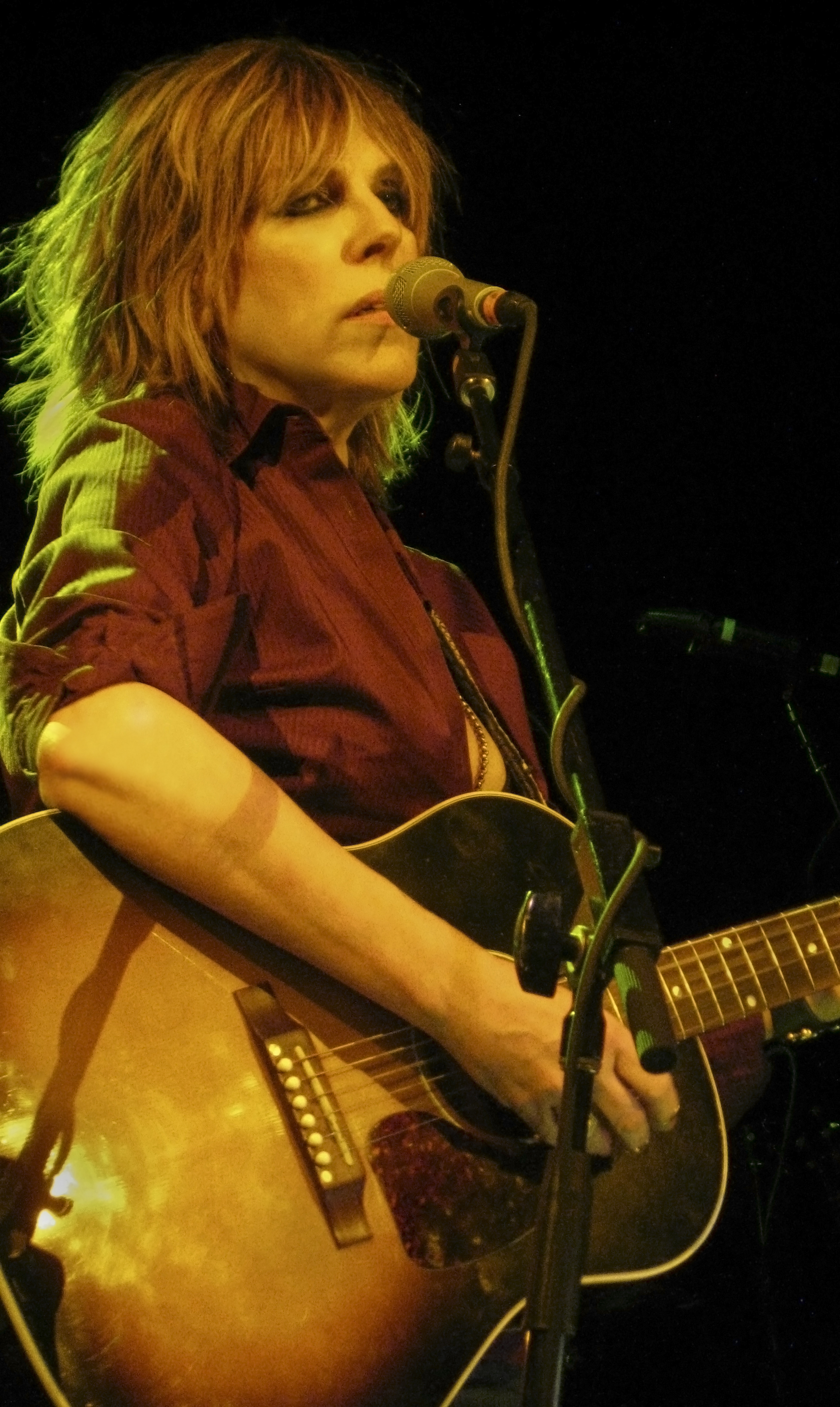
Carpenter's 1993 single "Passionate Kisses" was written and originally recorded by Lucinda Williams, pictured in 2009.

Come On Come On, Carpenter's fourth Columbia album, was also her most commercially successful. A decade after its 1992 release, it was certified quadruple platinum by the Recording Industry Association of America (RIAA), honoring shipments of four million copies in the United States. It also charted a total of seven singles between 1992 and 1994. First among these was "I Feel Lucky". Upon its release to country radio, it achieved a peak of number four on Hot Country Songs. The song was also a crossover hit in Canada, reaching top five on the country charts and number sixteen on the Adult Contemporary charts (both then published by RPM). The next release from the album was "Not Too Much to Ask", a duet with Joe Diffie. Following this was a cover of Lucinda Williams' 1989 single "Passionate Kisses". In addition to becoming a top-five country hit, Carpenter's rendition of the song went to number 57 on the Billboard Hot 100 and number 11 on the Adult Contemporary charts, her first entry on either. In 1993, Carpenter joined other female country singers including Patty Loveless and Kathy Mattea for a television special on CBS titled The Women of Country.

The next single off Come On Come On was "The Hard Way", followed by a cover of Dire Straits' "The Bug". After it came the top-ten hits "He Thinks He'll Keep Her" and "I Take My Chances". Carpenter co-wrote "I Feel Lucky", "Not Too Much to Ask", "He Thinks He'll Keep Her", and "I Take My Chances" with Don Schlitz, and wrote "The Hard Way" by herself. Come On Come On accounted for a number of Grammy Award wins and nominations for Carpenter. "I Feel Lucky" and "Passionate Kisses" won in the category of Best Female Country Vocal Performance in 1993 and 1994 respectively, while "The Hard Way" was nominated by the same association for Best Country Song. Like its predecessor, Come On Come On featured several musical collaborators. Colvin provided backing vocals on "The Hard Way", "Passionate Kisses", and the title track, with the Indigo Girls also appearing on the former. In addition, Rosanne Cash provided vocals to "Rhythm of the Blues". Former Sly and the Family Stone member Andy Newmark played drums on three tracks. David Browne of Entertainment Weekly thought the album had more "edge and directness" than its predecessors, and thought that the lyrics had a theme of "women caught between tradition and contemporary roles who realize that the solution lies with their own inner resolve".

Later in 1994, Carpenter released Stones in the Road. Upon its release, it became her only one to reach number one on the Billboard Top Country Albums charts. Likewise, the lead single "Shut Up and Kiss Me" became her only number one on Hot Country Songs. Follow-up "Tender When I Want to Be" peaked at number six, but the next two singles were less successful. "House of Cards" peaked at 21, while "Why Walk When You Can Fly?" became her first to miss top 40 entirely. Stones in the Road was certified double platinum for American sales of two million copies. Carpenter wrote every song on the album by herself. Among the contributing musicians were drummer Kenny Aronoff and keyboardist Benmont Tench. "Shut Up and Kiss Me" and "Tender When I Want to Be" both featured backing vocals from Trisha Yearwood, while Lee Roy Parnell played slide guitar on both the former and closing track "This Is Love". The title track was inspired by her memories of seeing Robert F. Kennedy's funeral procession when she was young. Reviewing the album for AllMusic, Thom Jurek stated that "Carpenter cut back on the number of hooks in her melodies, creating a palette that required closer listening to appreciate". He compared "Tender When I Want to Be" to the work of Bruce Springsteen, and considered "John Doe No. 24" and "The End of My Pirate Days" "moodier" than her previous works. Stones in the Road won Carpenter her first Grammy Award for Best Country Album at the 37th Annual Grammy Awards. At the same ceremony, "Shut Up and Kiss Me" won Best Female Country Vocal Performance and was nominated for Best Country Song, thus meaning that Carpenter won the former award in four consecutive years. She also received her first nomination outside the association's country music categories that year, when "He Thinks He'll Keep Her" was nominated for Record of the Year.

=== 1996–1999: Continuation of Columbia years ===
In 1996, Carpenter recorded a song titled "Dreamland" for a multi-artist album of lullabies called 'Til Their Eyes Shine: The Lullaby Album. The same year HarperCollins published the song's lyrics in a children's book also titled Dreamland, with illustrations by Julia Noonan. All profits from sales of the book were donated to the Institute for Intercultural Understanding, a children's advocacy group. Her last studio album to be released in the 1990s was 1997's A Place in the World. As was the case with Stones in the Road, she wrote every song on the album by herself. Carpenter told Russ DeVault of The Atlanta Constitution (now The Atlanta Journal-Constitution) before the album's release that she wished she had more time to record the album because she "likes to tweak things". She also stated that the title track represented a "sense of identity" and "search for fulfillment". Lead single "Let Me into Your Heart" made number eleven on the country music charts. Three singles followed—"I Want to Be Your Girlfriend", "The Better to Dream of You", and "Keeping the Faith"— but these three were considerably less successful. "Let Me into Your Heart" accounted for a Grammy nomination for Best Female Country Vocal Performance, her last in that category. Jurek wrote that the album "doesn't offer the deep reflective rewards of Stones in the Road, nor is it quite as kinetic as Come On Come On". Despite this, he thought that it was "well-crafted" and considered "Let Me into Your Heart" to have influences of soul music. After this album, Carpenter stated that she began to feel "malaise" toward the pace of her career. As a result, she deliberately scheduled fewer touring dates to allow herself more time spent with family and friends. She also expressed disdain toward A Place in the World, as she felt her management had pressured her into making a "commercially viable" album instead of letting her choose songs she wanted to record. As a result, she hired a new manager, Ron Fierstein, who at the time was also serving in this capacity for Colvin. Fierstein was supportive of Carpenter's decision to slow the pace of her career, and encouraged her to focus on touring and selecting songs until she felt she was ready to make another album.

In 1999 she released her first greatest hits album Party Doll and Other Favorites. Unlike most greatest hits packages, this consisted mostly of live recordings curated from various concerts and television appearances throughout the 1990s. It also included new studio recordings, which Carpenter and Jennings produced with Blake Chancey. The title track was a cover of Mick Jagger's "Party Doll", from his 1987 album Primitive Cool. Two of the new recordings, "Almost Home" and "Wherever You Are", were issued as singles, with the former becoming her last top-40 country hit. Eli Messinger of Country Standard Time thought that the more up-tempo tracks such as "Down at the Twist and Shout" and "Shut Up and Kiss Me" showed "just how much fun Carpenter can be", while overall praising the album for including the majority of her hit singles.

=== 2000–2004: Departure from Columbia ===
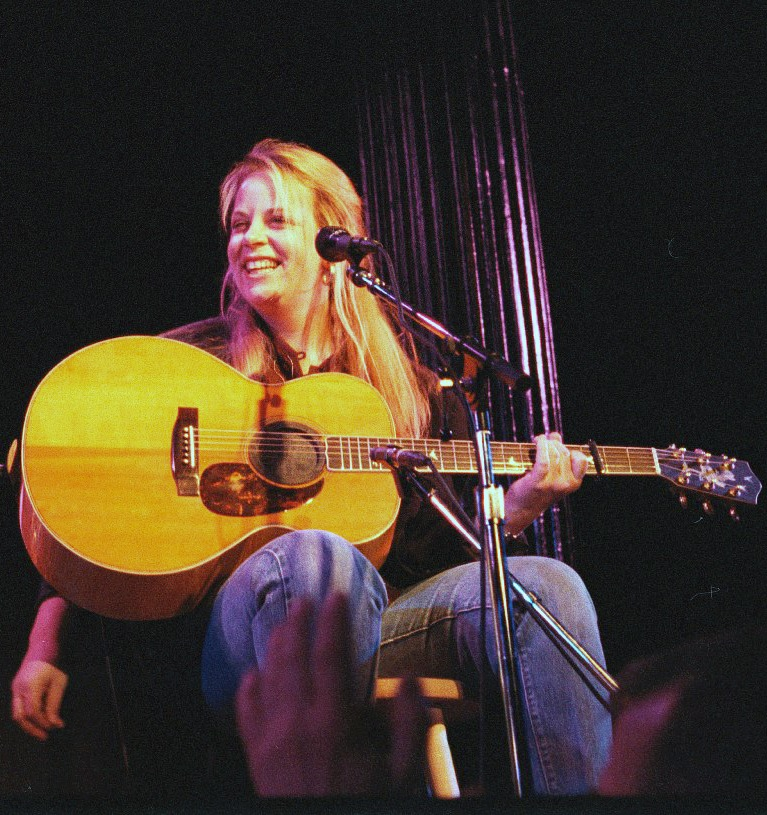
Carpenter in 2006

Her next Columbia album was 2000's Time* Sex* Love*. Lead single "Simple Life" accounted for her last chart entry to date, peaking at number 53 on Hot Country Songs. According to Carpenter, the asterisks in the title represented an abbreviation of its full name: "Time is the great gift; sex is the great equalizer; love is the great mystery". This was a response that Jennings had to Carpenter when she stated that those three concepts were all represented in the album's lyrical content. Carpenter recorded the album at AIR Studios, a studio in London owned by George Martin. Chancey once again assisted her and Jennings on production duties. She wrote every song on the album, collaborating with Kim Richey, Gary Burr, and Jennings on some tracks. She also said that unlike with A Place in the World, she wanted to focus on making an album that she enjoyed, instead of attempting to find songs which would be successful at radio. Throughout 2000 and 2001, she toured in both the United Kingdom and the United States, with Steve Earle joining her for the latter. Stephen Thomas Erlewine of AllMusic said of the album that it "found Carpenter departing somewhat from her country-inflected sound and ruminating on relationships and career from a distinctly middle-aged perspective". John Kenyon of the Cedar Rapids, Iowa Gazette thought the album was well-produced but considered it too long and lacking in musical variety. During this album's corresponding tour, Carpenter underwent arthroscopic surgery for a knee injury and thus had to perform most of the concerts while seated. She also told Dave Scheiber of the Tampa Bay Times that while the album's songs were positively received in concert, she was disappointed by the lack of radio play and questioned whether she still considered herself a country artist.

In 2002, Carpenter joined Emmylou Harris, Bruce Cockburn, and Patty Griffin in a benefit concert for Campaigning for a Landmine Free World, an organization dedicated to raising awareness of landmines left behind in former war zones. This concert was held at the Thomas Wolfe Auditorium in Asheville, North Carolina. She was also named by Habitat for Humanity as the head of their Build Project, which employed women to build houses for the homeless across the United States. Her contract with Columbia ended with her eighth studio album, 2004's Between Here and Gone. Before its release, she stated in an interview with National Public Radio (NPR) that the title track was inspired by the death of songwriter Dave Carter. Other songs on the album were inspired by the emotions Carpenter felt after the September 11 attacks. For this album, Carpenter chose session pianist Matt Rollings to produce, as she wanted to achieve a different production style than John Jennings offered. Despite this, Jennings still played several instruments on the album. Other musicians included Mac McAnally, Stuart Duncan, and Viktor Krauss. The album's cover art was painted by Atlanta, Georgia-based painter Donna Mintz, who gave the original art to her as a gift and stated that she often listened to Carpenter's albums for inspiration. Jurek thought the album was "a sophisticated but very accessible recording, pleasant in its tempos and in its lush presentation."

=== 2007–2014: Zoë Records ===
After leaving Columbia Records, Carpenter signed with the independent Zoë Records (a division of Rounder Records) in 2006. Her first release for the label was 2007's The Calling. While it accounted for no charting singles, the release reached number ten on the Billboard country albums charts. It was also nominated for the Grammy Award for Best Contemporary Folk Album in 2007. Once again she wrote the entire album by herself and co-produced with Rollings. Jurek thought the album had stronger rock music influences than its predecessors due to a heavier use of electric guitar and drums, while saying of the album's lyrics that she "has a hell of a way of looking at life from all sides". Shortly after the album's release Carpenter was hospitalized for a pulmonary embolism, which forced her to cancel all concert dates that year. After being released from the hospital on April 27, 2007, she issued a statement on her website saying she was recovering and planned to tour again in 2008. Once she had recovered she began work on Come Darkness, Come Light: Twelve Songs of Christmas, her first album of Christmas music. This was released in 2008. For this project, Carpenter covered tracks by Robin and Linda Williams and the Red Clay Ramblers. She also included renditions of the carol "Once in Royal David's City" and the African-American spiritual "Children, Go Where I Send Thee", in addition to a number of songs she wrote herself. Jennings returned as producer for this project. She stated that the two intentionally sought to make the recording "spare", and thus did most of the songs with Jennings playing various acoustic instruments and Jon Carroll on piano.

She continued to record for Zoë Records throughout the 2010s, with her next project being The Age of Miracles in 2010. Many of the songs on this album were inspired by the emotions she felt after suffering her embolism, particularly the impact it had on her touring and recording career at the time. In particular, she stated that the track "Iceland" represented the "feelings of loss and darkness and disconnection" she felt while hospitalized, and closing track "The Way I Feel" was about the "resilience" she felt after successfully recovering. Rollings co-produced and contributed on piano and Hammond organ, while Dan Dugmore played steel guitar and twelve-string guitar. The album also featured duets with Alison Krauss and Vince Gill. Mark Deming of AllMusic wrote that the album was "a literate and thoughtful set of songs that speak to the concerns of the heart and soul with equal portions of compassion and intelligence", although he thought it might not appeal to fans of Carpenter's more up-tempo work such as "Shut Up and Kiss Me". Jonathan Keefe of Slant Magazine was less favorable toward the album, praising the lyrics of the title track and "I Put My Ring Back On" but overall criticizing the album's sound as "a pedestrian, coffeehouse blend of hushed acoustic strumming." In July 2010, Carpenter performed "I Feel Lucky" at the Grand Ole Opry before doing a concert at the Tennessee Performing Arts Center to promote The Age of Miracles. Throughout mid-2011, she toured across the United States in support of this album.

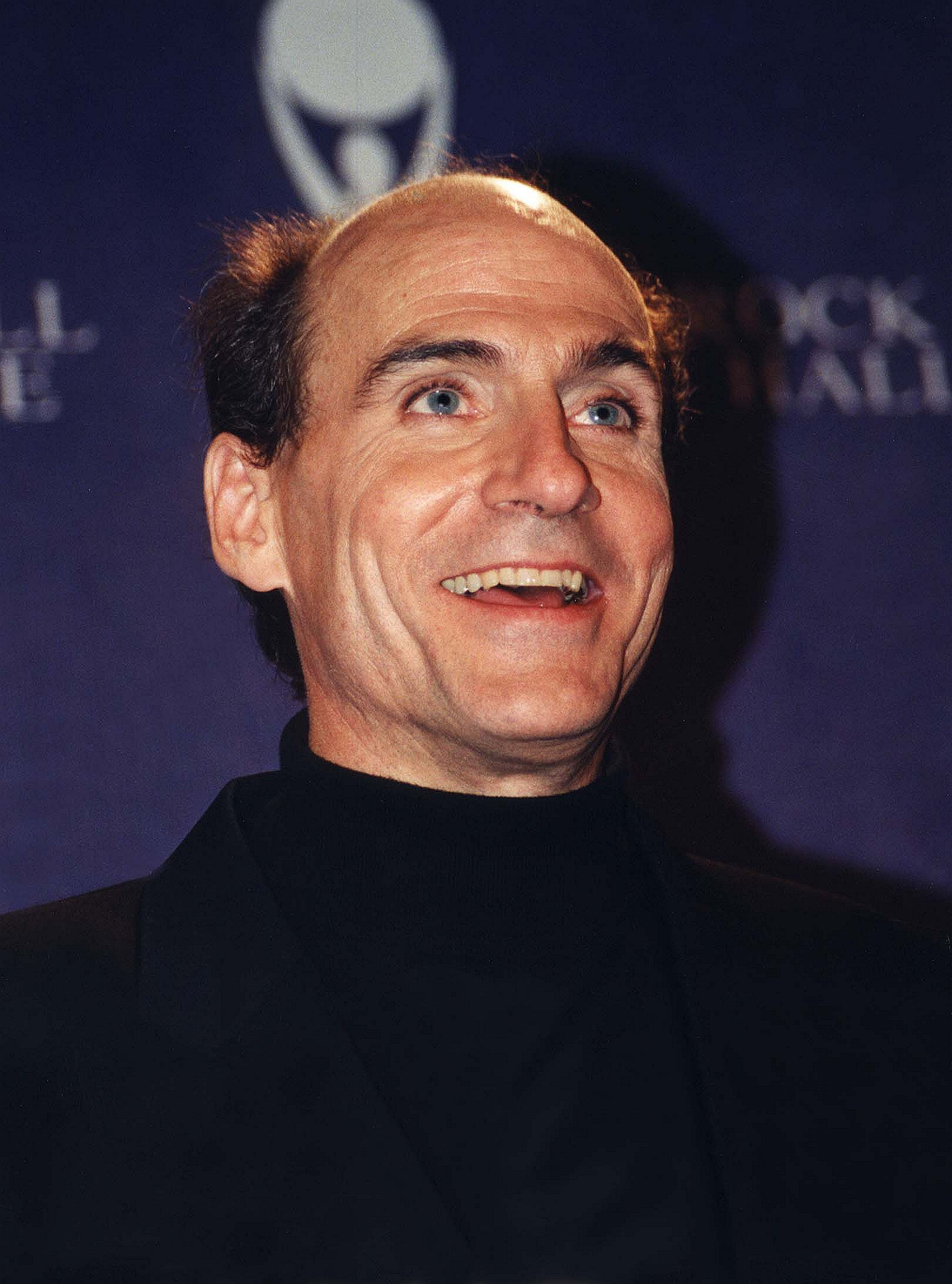
Carpenter's 2012 album Ashes and Roses included a duet with James Taylor, pictured in 2000.

Ashes and Roses followed on Zoë in 2012. Two personal life events influenced this album's songs: the death of her father, and her divorce from her husband. James Taylor provided duet vocals on the track "Soul Companion". Jurek called this project "the most confessional record of her career" and praised the use of Hammond organ and mandolin in the production. Allison Stewart of The Washington Post wrote that it had "woeful and beautiful coffeehouse folk songs, decorated with sparing, almost offhanded instrumentation that’s often limited to guitars and pianos." Keefe was less favorable toward the project, criticizing Carpenter's "hushed" vocal tone and the lack of hooks. Her next project was 2013's Songs from the Movie, a collaboration with composer and conductor Vince Mendoza. This consisted of orchestral re-recordings of existing songs in her catalog. After this album's 2014 release, she performed selections from it with the BBC Scottish Symphony Orchestra at the Celtic Connections festival in Glasgow, Scotland. Writing for Country Standard Time, Jeffrey B. Remz thought the album needed "a bit more energy" and "veers decidedly towards the precious and pretty side, but sometimes a bit too much so." In 2014, Carpenter's touring schedule included a mix of orchestral performances comprising selections from Songs from the Movie, as well as acoustic sets featuring Jon Carroll, multi-instrumentalist John Doyle, and opening act Tift Merritt.

=== 2015–present: Albums on Lambent Light ===
After leaving the Zoë label, she began recording her next album in 2015 with production work from Dave Cobb. This album, The Things That We Are Made Of, was released in 2016 via Carpenter's own Lambent Light Records label, with distribution rights by Thirty Tigers. In addition to producing the album, Cobb played guitar, Moog synthesizer, and Mellotron. "Something Tamed Something Wild" was selected as the lead single. Carpenter promoted the album with a number of dates throughout 2016, starting with a concert at Wolf Trap National Park for the Performing Arts in Washington, D.C., that July. Carpenter said that she intentionally intended for her vocal tracks to be "imperfect", and that she had difficulty "relinquishing control" of production duties. She also said that some of the songs were inspired by her walking her dog through the Blue Ridge Mountains. Prior to the album's release, NPR streamed it online through its First Listen program. Scott Stroud of The Associated Press described Cobb's production as "elegant" and considered it well suited to Carpenter's voice; he also thought that Carpenter's lyrics showed an "unexpectedly poignant turn of phrase". Also in 2015, longtime collaborator John Jennings died of kidney cancer.

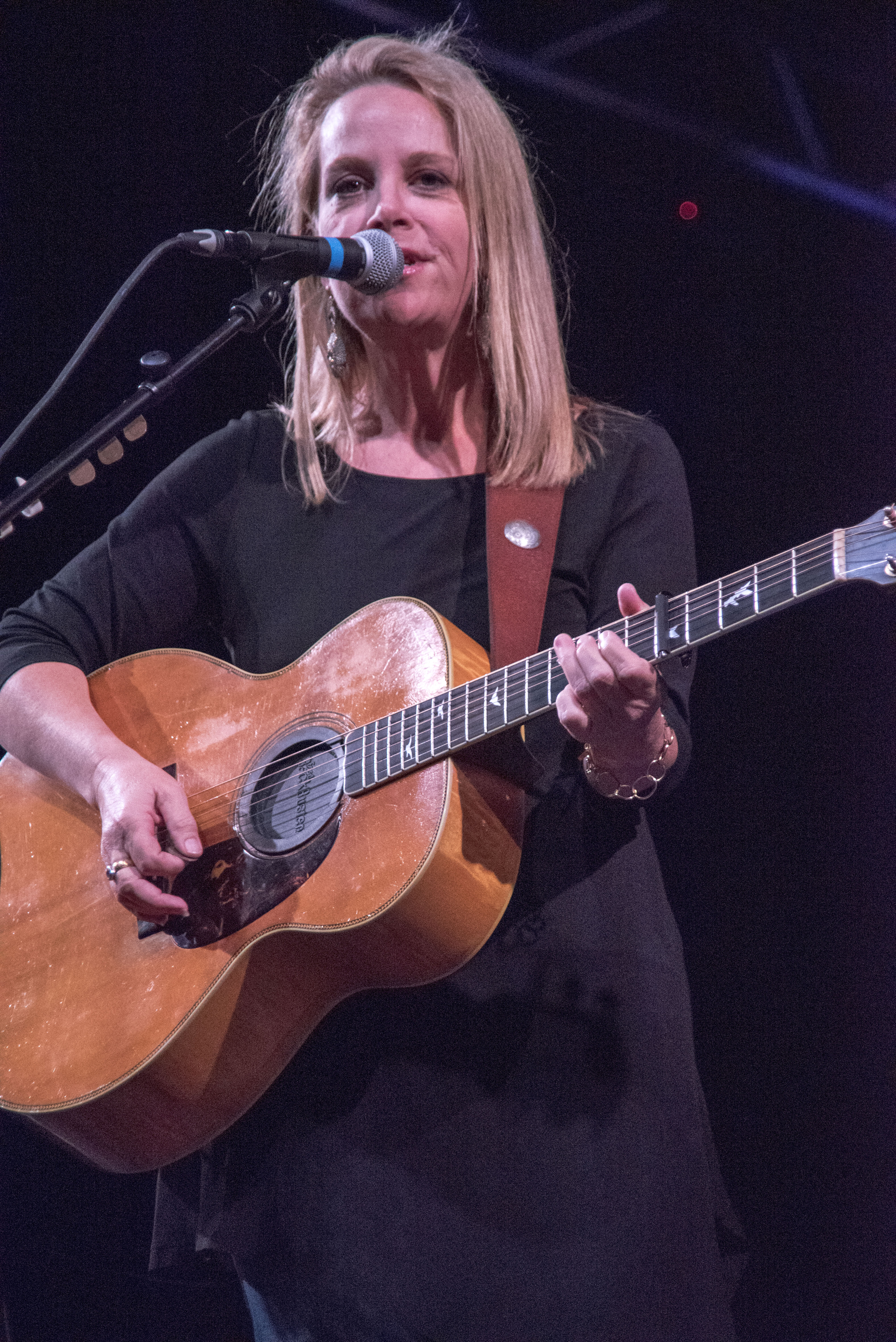
Carpenter performing in 2015

Next on Lambent Light was 2018's Sometimes Just the Sky. This album consisted of re-recordings of tracks from each of her previous albums, as well as the title track, the only original composition. English record producer Ethan Johns produced the project, in addition to selecting all of the musicians except for Carpenter's touring guitarist Duke Levine. The musicians recorded the project at Real World Studios, owned by Peter Gabriel. After its release, she embarked on a tour throughout mid-2018 in support. Following this project, she and Johns began work on another album. However, production was put on hiatus in early 2020 due to the COVID-19 pandemic. In response, Carpenter began streaming live acoustic performances online. The second project with Johns, The Dirt and the Stars, was released in August 2020. Also in 2020, she returned to Wolf Trap where, without an audience present, she performed a 26-song solo acoustic set. This set was recorded as an album and DVD release titled One Night Lonely, which received a Grammy Award for Best Folk Album nomination. Once COVID-19 restrictions subsided across the United States, she announced plans to tour with Colvin in 2021. Due to a shoulder injury, she canceled these tour dates and did not begin touring again until 2022. Her tours in this timespan included a number of songs from The Dirt and the Stars.

Carpenter's next album was released in January 2025. Titled Looking for the Thread, it is a collaboration with Scottish folk singers Julie Fowlis and Karine Polwart. She had met the two at the Celtic Connections music festival in Glasgow, and Fowlis and Polwart agreed to collaborate because they were fans of Carpenter's music.

Carpenter released a new album on June 6, 2025, titled Personal History, via Lambent Light/Thirty Tigers.

== Collaborations and other works ==
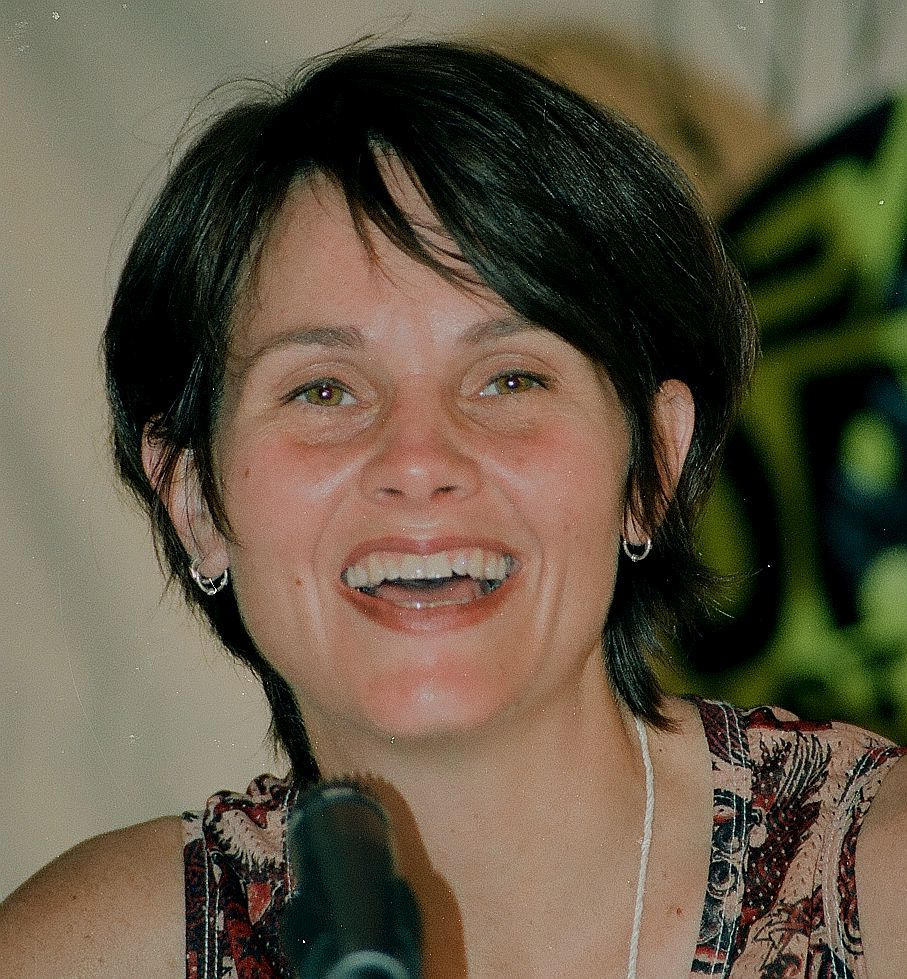
Carpenter has collaborated with Shawn Colvin (pictured in 1995) on a number of occasions.

Carpenter has appeared on a number of works by other artists. One of her first guest appearances was on the Indigo Girls' 1990 album Nomads Indians Saints, where she provided vocals to the track "Hammer and a Nail". She did likewise to Colvin's "Climb on a Back That's Strong" and Radney Foster's "Nobody Wins", both from 1992. A year later, she joined Billy Ray Cyrus, Kathy Mattea, Tanya Tucker, and Pam Tillis on Dolly Parton's single "Romeo". This song was nominated for a Grammy Award for Best Country Collaboration with Vocals in 1994. Another collaboration with Colvin, "One Cool Remove", was released as a single from Colvin's 1994 album Cover Girl. This rendition was a charted single for both artists in the United Kingdom a year later. Also in 1994, Carpenter and Kim Richey sang backing vocals on Tillis' cover of Jackie DeShannon's "When You Walk in the Room", a single from the album Sweetheart's Dance.

In 1996, she sang a cover of John Lennon's "Grow Old with Me" on the multi-artist tribute album Working Class Hero: A Tribute to John Lennon. This rendition peaked at number 17 on the Adult Contemporary chart. She sang the song "Dead Man Walking (A Dream Like This)" for the soundtrack of the 1996 movie Dead Man Walking. A year later, she covered Dionne Warwick's "I'll Never Fall in Love Again" for the soundtrack of the movie My Best Friend's Wedding. Carpenter also appeared on bluegrass musician Randy Scruggs' only charted single "It's Only Love", from his 1998 album Crown of Jewels. In 2002, she joined Sheryl Crow and Emmylou Harris to cover Johnny Cash's "Flesh and Blood" for the tribute album Kindred Spirits: A Tribute to the Songs of Johnny Cash. This track received a nomination for Best Country Collaboration with Vocals at the 45th Annual Grammy Awards.

Carpenter is credited as a writer on a number of songs for other artists. These include Cyndi Lauper's "Sally's Pigeons", Wynonna Judd's "Girls with Guitars", Trisha Yearwood's "Where Are You Now", and Terri Clark's "No Fear".

== Musical style ==
Carpenter's music is defined by her folk music influences and lyrical focus. Erlewine wrote that Carpenter "found favor on country radio in the 1980s and '90s by taking her emotionally intelligent songs to a mass audience." Of her 1980s albums, he stated that "Country radio was hesitant to play her soft, folky, feminist material, but she received good reviews and airplay on more progressive country stations, as well as college radio". In the Virgin Encyclopedia of Country Music, Colin Larkin noted the use of electric guitar in her more upbeat material such as "Passionate Kisses" and "The Hard Way", while also referring to "House of Cards" as "thought-provoking". He also stated, "she, together with the likes of Trisha Yearwood, Suzy Bogguss, and Kathy Mattea, has brought fresh melody to an old and sometimes predictable genre." Larry Katz of the Red Deer Advocate contrasted her with Yearwood and Wynonna Judd, noting that unlike those artists, Carpenter usually wrote her songs herself instead of relying on Nashville-based songwriters. Alanna Nash of Entertainment Weekly thought that by being a graduate of an Ivy League college, Carpenter "seemed the least likely female to go the distance on the country charts". Similarly, Katz thought that her upbringing was atypical of country music, which is more commonly associated with demographics pertaining to the rural Southern United States.

Nash also noted the difference between "decidedly noncountry themes like Halley’s Comet and the spiritual life of old shirts" in contrast to her more up-tempo material such as "Down at the Twist and Shout". In a review of Stones in the Road for the same publication, Browne contrasted that album with Come On Come On, saying of the latter that "her square-jawed voice, leaner lyrics, and the sturdy-as-a-wooden-fence folk rock combined to make a deserved[...]breakthrough." He also said of her writing style that Carpenter "sounds like someone who sits down and thinks about it — a lot — before committing it to song. Not since the heyday of Gordon Lightfoot has a singer-songwriter been so damn reasonable." Mike DeGagne of AllMusic said of Carpenter's lyrics that she "portray[s] maturely the perils of romance and heartbreak from a female perspective". Writing for American Songwriter, Deborah Evans Price noted themes of feminism due to many of her songs being about single women attempting to overcome setbacks in her life; of this, Carpenter stated that "I've just been kind of writing for me." Similarly, Nash stated that many of the songs on Shooting Straight in the Dark featured women protagonists who "take matters into their own hands". Eli Messinger of Country Standard Time described her singing voice as having "empathic clarity and force", particularly on "Passionate Kisses" and "He Thinks He'll Keep Her". He also stated that the former song had a theme of "desire", and the latter a "call to self-fulfillment". Keefe found influences of folk and country pop in her 1990s albums, but thought that much of her work in the 21st century was "mixed" due to a lack of uptempo material and lyrical themes which he considered too similar to each other. He described the stronger tracks on these albums as appealing to adult album alternative formats.

== Personal life ==
Carpenter was unmarried for most of her recording career. In a 1994 profile, Dana Kennedy of Entertainment Weekly referred to Carpenter as "a spokes-singer for the thirtysomething single woman". On June 1, 2002, she married Timmy Smith, a general contractor then working in Batesville, Virginia. Actress Sissy Spacek and singer Dave Matthews were in attendance at the wedding. By 2007, the couple lived on a farm outside Charlottesville, Virginia. The couple divorced shortly before the release of Ashes and Roses (2012), at which point Carpenter continued to live on the farm. That album's track "What to Keep and What to Throw Away" was inspired by her divorce from Smith.

Carpenter was the author of four columns in The Washington Times from December 2008 to March 2009, in which she discussed topics related to music and politics. Ben Walsh of The Independent cited this, along with her involvements in various charities, as examples of Carpenter's liberal political leanings. Relatedly, she told The Buffalo News in 1995 that she considered herself to be politically liberal; she also stated that "it seems as if the Republicans co-opted the entire country music community. In fact, a lot of country artists are Democrats."

== Awards ==
Carpenter has won five Grammy Awards, three Academy of Country Music awards, and two Country Music Association awards.

== Discography ==
Studio albums

- Hometown Girl (1987)
- State of the Heart (1989)
- Shooting Straight in the Dark (1990)
- Come On Come On (1992)
- Stones in the Road (1994)
- A Place in the World (1996)
- Time* Sex* Love* (2001)
- Between Here and Gone (2004)
- The Calling (2007)
- The Age of Miracles (2010)
- Ashes and Roses (2012)
- Songs from the Movie (2014)
- The Things That We Are Made Of (2016)
- Sometimes Just the Sky (2018)
- The Dirt and the Stars (2020)
- Personal History (2025)

Christmas albums

- Come Darkness, Come Light: Twelve Songs of Christmas (2008)

Collaborative albums

- Looking for the Thread (2025) (with Julie Fowlis and Karine Polwart)
