= Duke Levine =

American guitarist

Duke Levine (born November 29, 1961) is an American guitarist, known primarily for his rock and country music playing as a session musician.

Levine was born in Worcester, Massachusetts, United States. He has recorded and performed with Shawn Colvin, Peter Wolf, Lucy Kaplansky, Bill Morrissey, Jonatha Brooke, John Gorka, David Maxwell, Dennis Brennan, Jeanie Stahl, Ellis Paul, Mary Chapin Carpenter, Slaid Cleaves and many others. From 2009 to 2015, he was the touring guitarist for The J. Geils Band and is currently playing with Bonnie Raitt. He frequently performs live with The Duke Levine Band and Slaid Cleaves.

== Discography ==
- 1992: Nobody's Home
- 1994: Country Soul Guitar
- 1997: Lava
- 2007: Beneath the Blue
- 2016: The Fade Out
- 2021: Left To My Own Devices
- 2025: Duke Levine & The Super Sweet Sounds of the ’70s
