= Zoë Records =

- Parent company: Concord (until 2026); BMG Rights Management (since 2026)
- Distributor: Universal Music Group
- Genre: Folk rock, pop
- Country of origin: U.S.
- Official website: www.rounder.com

Zoë Records is an independent record label that is a part of the Rounder Records group. Zoë predominantly distributes albums by folk rock and alternative pop artists. Artists who have released albums on the label include Mary Chapin Carpenter, Lisa Loeb, Grant Lee Phillips, Juliana Hatfield, Jules Shear, and The Nields. Preteen pop girl group Girl Authority also recorded for the label.

== Distribution ==
Zoë is also the American distributor for releases by a number of Canadian artists who have separate deals with major or independent labels in Canada, such as Jann Arden, Cowboy Junkies, Sarah Harmer, Kathleen Edwards, Great Big Sea, Rush, the Cash Brothers, and the Tragically Hip. The record label is named after Zoë Virant, the daughter of CEO John Virant and former member of pop group Girl Authority.

== Roster ==
- Mary Chapin Carpenter
- Merrie Amsterburg
- The Harris
- Felix Brothers
- Jann Arden
- The Bacon Brothers
- Blake Babies
- BoDeans
- Dean & Britta
- Tracy Bonham
- Cash Brothers
- Cowboy Junkies
- The Damnwells
- Gord Downie
- Minnie Driver
- Chris Duarte Group
- Juliana Hatfield
- Nicolai Dunger
- Kathleen Edwards
- Euphoria (Canadian band)
- Girl Authority
- Great Big Sea
- Kay Hanley
- Sarah Harmer
- The Kennedys
- King Wilkie
- The Knitters
- John Linnell
- Lisa Loeb
- Laura Love
- Nerissa & Katryna Nields
- The Nields
- Dolores O'Riordan
- Steven Page
- Grant-Lee Phillips
- Marky Ramone and the Intruders
- Rush
- Jules Shear
- Duncan Sheik
- Shivaree
- Tangle Eye
- Vienna Teng
- They Might Be Giants
- The Tragically Hip
- Martha Wainwright
- King Wilkie
- Philip "Money" Owusu

== See also ==
- List of record labels
