= John Jennings (musician) =

American musician, producer (1953–2015)

- Born: John Edward Jennings; November 22, 1953; Harrisonburg, Virginia, U.S.
- Died: October 16, 2015 (aged 61) Rockville, Maryland, U.S.
- Genres: Rock; country
- Occupations: Guitarist; record producer
- Instrument: Guitar
- Years active: 1987-2014

John Edward Jennings (November 22, 1953 – October 16, 2015) was an American musician: a guitarist, multi-instrumentalist, and music producer.

== Career ==
Among his credits as a producer are eight albums which he produced for Mary Chapin Carpenter, as well as releases by BeauSoleil, John Gorka, and Janis Ian. Jennings has played acoustic, electric, slide, lap, steel and baritone guitars, synthesizers, organ, piano and percussion, sung background vocals and/or produced albums for Carpenter, the Indigo Girls, the Rankin Family, Niamh Kavanagh, Cheryl Wheeler, Iris DeMent, George Jones and Robin & Linda Williams, among many others. As a recording artist, he has five albums to his credit.

After Bill Danoff (of the Starland Vocal Band) introduced him to Mary Chapin Carpenter, they began performing together in the Washington, D.C., area. An album recorded to be sold at their shows was released by Columbia Records as Carpenter's 1987 debut album, Hometown Girl.

He has been nominated for several Grammy awards, and has won more than 20 Wammie (Washington Area Music Association) awards over the last 20 years.

== Personal life ==
John Jennings was diagnosed with metastatic kidney cancer in March 2014. He died on October 16, 2015.

== Discography ==
=== Albums ===
- Buddy (1997)
- I Belong To You (1998)
- More Noise From Nowhere (2007)
- It's All Good (2007)
