= Shawn Colvin discography =

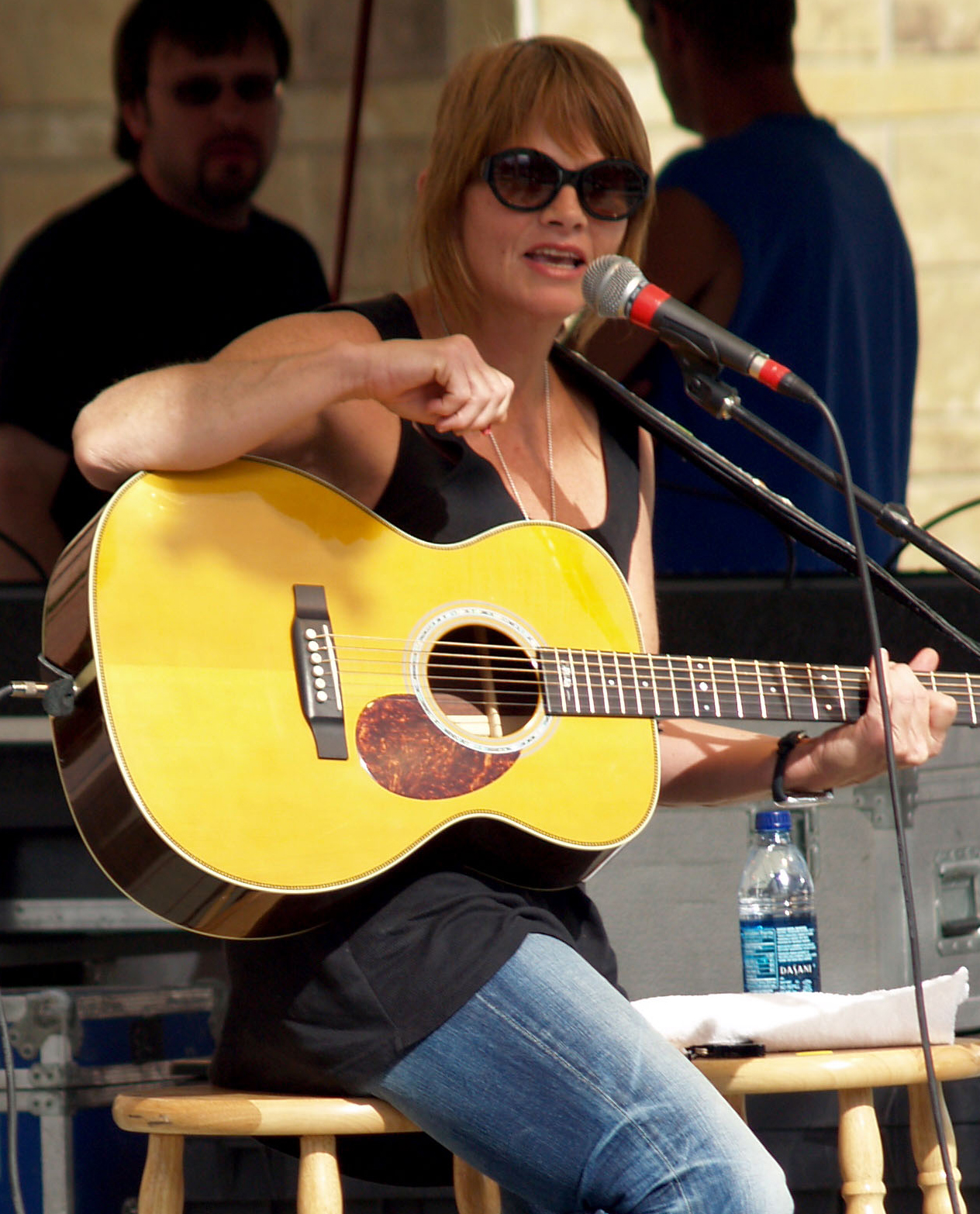
- Colvin in 2008
- Studio albums: 12
- Live albums: 2
- Singles: 16

The discography of Shawn Colvin, an American singer-songwriter and musician, consists of eight studio albums, two live albums and sixteen singles.

== Studio albums ==
Title	Album details	Peak chart positions						Certifications (sales threshold)
Title	Album details	US	US Rock	US Folk	AUS	NZ	UK	Certifications (sales threshold)
Steady On	Release date: October 17, 1989; Label: Columbia; Formats: LP, CD, cassette	111	—	—	102	—	—	
Fat City	Release date: October 27, 1992; Label: Columbia; Formats: CD, cassette, LP (Spain only)	142	—	—	137	—	—	
Cover Girl	Release date: August 23, 1994; Label: Columbia; Formats: CD, cassette	48	—	—	—	—	67	
A Few Small Repairs	Release date: October 1, 1996; Label: Columbia; Formats: CD, cassette	39	—	—	48	24	100	US: Platinum
Holiday Songs and Lullabies	Release date: October 27, 1998; Label: Columbia; Formats: CD, cassette	181	—	—	—	—	—	
Whole New You	Release date: March 27, 2001; Label: Columbia; Formats: CD	101	—	—	—	—	122	
These Four Walls	Release date: September 12, 2006; Label: Nonesuch; Formats: CD, music download	109	—	—	—	—	104	
All Fall Down	Release date: June 5, 2012; Label: Nonesuch; Formats: CD, music download	126	45	7	—	—	—	
Uncovered	Release date: September 25, 2015; Label: Fantasy; Formats: LP, CD, music download	175	—	—	—	—	—	
Colvin & Earle (with Steve Earle)	Release date: June 10, 2016; Label: Fantasy; Formats: LP, CD, music download	128	16	8	—	—	—	
The Starlighter	Release date: February 23, 2018; Label: SLCRecordings; Formats: CD, music download	—	—	—	—	—	—	
Steady On: 30th Anniversary Acoustic Edition	Release date: 2019; Label: SLCRecordings; Formats: CD, music download	—	—	—	—	—	—	
"—" denotes releases that did not chart

== Live albums ==
Title	Album details
Live '88	Release date: October 1995; Label: Plump Records; Formats: CD, cassette
Live	Release date: June 2009; Label: Nonesuch; Formats: CD, Download

== Compilation albums ==
Title	Album details
Polaroids: A Greatest Hits Collection	Release date: November 23, 2004; Label: Columbia Records; Formats: CD, music download
The Best of Shawn Colvin	Release date: July 20, 2010; Label: Camden; Formats: CD, music download

== Singles ==
Year	Single	Peak chart positions							Album
Year	Single	US	US AC	US Alt	US Adult	AUS	CAN	UK	Album
1990	"Steady On"	—	30	23	—	99	—	—	Steady on
1990	"Diamond in the Rough"	—	—	—	—	—	—	—	Steady on
1992	"Round of Blues"	—	44	25	—	—	—	73	Fat City
1992	"Climb on (A Back That's Strong)"	—	—	—	—	—	—	—	Fat City
1993	"I Don't Know Why"	—	16	—	—	—	59	62	Fat City
1994	"Every Little Thing He Does Is Magic"	—	—	—	—	178	—	65	Cover Girl
1995	"One Cool Remove" (with Mary Chapin Carpenter)	—	—	—	—	—	—	40	Cover Girl
1995	"I Don't Know Why" (re-release)	—	—	—	—	—	—	52	Fat City
1997	"Get Out of This House"	—	—	—	—	—	—	70	A Few Small Repairs
1997	"Sunny Came Home"	7	1	—	1	44	3	29	A Few Small Repairs
1997	"You and The Mona Lisa"	—	—	—	31	—	—	—	A Few Small Repairs
1998	"Nothin' on Me"	—	—	—	24	96	25	—	A Few Small Repairs
2001	"Whole New You"	—	24	—	—	—	—	—	Whole New You
2001	"Bound to You"	—	—	—	—	—	—	—	Whole New You
2006	"Fill Me Up"	—	—	—	—	—	—	—	These Four Walls
2006	"Let It Slide"	—	—	—	—	—	—	—	These Four Walls
2007	"Crazy"	—	—	—	—	—	—	—	Non-album single
2012	"All Fall Down (McKean/Cavallo Radio Mix)"	—	—	—	—	—	—	—	All Fall Down
"—" denotes releases that did not chart

== Other contributions ==
- Tom Russell – Heart On A Sleeve – Duet and background vocals on several tracks – Frontera – 1984
- Bruce Hornsby & The Range – A Night on the Town – Appearance on 4 tracks – "Barren Ground", "Stander on the Mountain", "Lost Soul" and "Special Night" – RCA – 1990
- It Could Happen to You: Musici from the Motion Picture – Track 1: "Young at Heart" – Tony Bennett and Shawn Colvin – Sony – 1994
- Beat the Retreat: Songs by Richard Thompson – "A Heart Needs a Home" (with Loudon Wainwright III) (1995, Capitol)
- Curtis Stigers – Time Was – Track 8: "Time Was" (Duet with Curtis Stigers) – Arista – 1995
- Till the Night Is Gone: Tribute to Doc Pomus – Track 3: "Viva Las Vegas" – Forward (2) – 1995
- One Fine Day: Music from the Motion Picture – Track 5: "Someone Like You" – Sony – 1996
- Grace of My Heart – Track 5: "Between Two Worlds" – MCA Soundtracks – 1996
- Jimmy Webb – Ten Easy Pieces Track 7: "Didn't We" (Harmony Vocals) – Guardian Records – 1996
- Legacy: A Tribute to Fleetwood Mac's Rumours – Track 7: "The Chain" – Atlantic Records – 1998
- Sesame Street: Elmopalooza! – Track 6: "I Don't Want to Live on the Moon" (with Ernie) – Sony Wonder – 1998
- Armageddon: The Album – Track 6: "When the Rainbow Comes" – 1998
- Runaway Bride: Music from the Motion Picture – Track 8: "Never Saw Blue Like That" – Sony – 1999
- Bela Fleck and the Flecktones – Outbound – Track 3: "A Moment So Close" (Vocals) – 2000
- The Emperor's New Groove (Soundtrack) – Track 7: "One Day She'll Love Me" (with Sting) - Walt Disney Records - 2000
- Chris Botti – Night Sessions – Track 5: "All Would Envy" (Lead Vocals) – Columbia – 2001
- The Little Bear Movie – "Great Big World", "Everybody Wants to Paint My Picture" – 2001
- Serendipity: Music from the Miramax Motion Picture Track 7: "When You Know" – Sony – 2001
- Stuart Little 2: Music from and Inspired by – Track 7: "Hold On To The Good Things" – Sony – 2002
- 107.1 KGSR Radio Austin – Broadcasts, Vol.10 – Track 7: "Not a Drop of Rain" – 2002
- WYEP Live and Direct: Volume 4 – On Air Performances – Track 3: "Whole New You" – 2002
- Because of Winn-Dixie – Track 9: “Fly” – Nettwerk – 2005
- Born to the Breed: A Tribute to Judy Collins – Track 1: "Secret Gardens" – Wildflower Records – 2008
- This One's for Him: A Tribute to Guy Clark Volume 1, Track 3: "All He Wants Is You" – Icehouse Music – 2011
- Buddy Miller – Buddy Miller's Majestic Silver Strings – Track 8: "That's the Way Love Goes" – New West Records – 2011
- Judy Collins – Bohemian – Track 2: "Cactus Tree" (with Judy Collins) – Wildflower Records Under Exclusive License to Cleopatra Records, Inc. – 2011
- Looking Into You: A Tribute to Jackson Browne – Track 20: "Call It a Loan" – Music Road Records – 2014
- Billy Childs – Map to the Treasure: Reimagining Laura Nyro – Track 8: "Save the Country" (with Chris Botti) – Sony Masterworks – 2014
- Buddy Miller & Friends – Cayamo Sessions at Sea – Track 8: "Wild Horses" – New West Records – 2016
