= The Essential Mary Chapin Carpenter =

Compilation album by Mary Chapin Carpenter
- Released: November 4, 2003
- Genre: Country
- Length: 69:31
- Label: Columbia
- Producers: Blake Chancey; Mary Chapin Carpenter; Gregg Geller; Mark Isham

Mary Chapin Carpenter chronology
Time* Sex* Love* (2001)	The Essential Mary Chapin Carpenter (2003)	Between Here and Gone (2004)

Professional ratings
Review scores
Source	Rating
AllMusic	4/5 stars

The Essential Mary Chapin Carpenter is the second compilation album by American singer-songwriter Mary Chapin Carpenter, released by Columbia Records on November 4, 2003. Unlike Carpenter's first compilation album, Party Doll and Other Favorites (1999), which comprised a mix of studio and live versions of her greatest hits, The Essential Mary Chapin Carpenter features the original studio versions only.

== Reception ==
The album reached No. 63 on Billboard's Top Country Albums chart. AllMusic rated the collection 4-out-of-5-stars, writing: "While the majority of these tracks are also included on Party Doll and Other Favorites, the difference is Essential contains the radio versions, not alternate takes or live tracks. Both discs are recommended to fans of Carpenter's modern folk/country hybrid." Barnes & Noble stated: "It's a challenge to summarize Mary Chapin Carpenter's deep catalogue on one disc, but this Essential release does a fine job of surveying the impressive range and sophistication of the singer-songwriter's music over the past decade-plus." Andy Gill summarized in an Uncut magazine review that "The mould-breaking Nashville singer-songwriter [got] a marvellous Best-Of.", noting in the review that "The largest part of this compilation comes from 1992's Come On, Come On, the album that broke her to a mainstream audience through Grammy-winning country hits like [Lucinda Williams'] 'Passionate Kisses'; the wry 'I Feel Lucky' and especially the anthemic instant classic 'He Thinks He'll Keep Her', about an ignored wife pining for affection."

== Track listing ==
All songs written by Mary Chapin Carpenter, except where noted.

No.	Title	Writer(s)	Original album	Length
1.	"Stones in the Road"		Stones in the Road (1994)	4:32
2.	"The Long Way Home"		Time* Sex* Love* (2001)	4:54
3.	"Shut Up and Kiss Me"		Stones in the Road (1994)	3:41
4.	"I Take My Chances"	Carpenter; Don Schlitz	Come On Come On (1992)	3:45
5.	"I Feel Lucky"	Carpenter; Schlitz	Come On Come On (1992)	3:31
6.	"Almost Home"	Carpenter; Beth Nielsen Chapman; Annie Roboff	Party Doll and Other Favorites (1999)	4:37
7.	"Halley Came to Jackson"		Shooting Straight in the Dark (1990)	3:10
8.	"I Am a Town"		Come On Come On (1992)	5:05
9.	"Quittin' Time"	Robb Royer; Roger Linn	State of the Heart (1989)	3:51
10.	"Down at the Twist and Shout"		Shooting Straight in the Dark (1990)	3:21
11.	"He Thinks He'll Keep Her"	Carpenter; Schlitz	Come On Come On (1992)	4:03
12.	"Only a Dream"		Come On Come On (1992)	5:32
13.	"Late for Your Life"		Time* Sex* Love* (2001)	5:35
14.	"The Hard Way"		Come On Come On (1992)	4:23
15.	"Passionate Kisses"	Lucinda Williams	Come On Come On (1992)	3:21
16.	"10,000 Miles"	Traditional	From the film Fly Away Home (1996)	6:10
Total length:				69:31

== Charts ==
Chart (2003)	Peak position
US Top Country Albums (Billboard)	60
