= List of awards and nominations received by Mary Chapin Carpenter =

Mary Chapin Carpenter awards and nominations
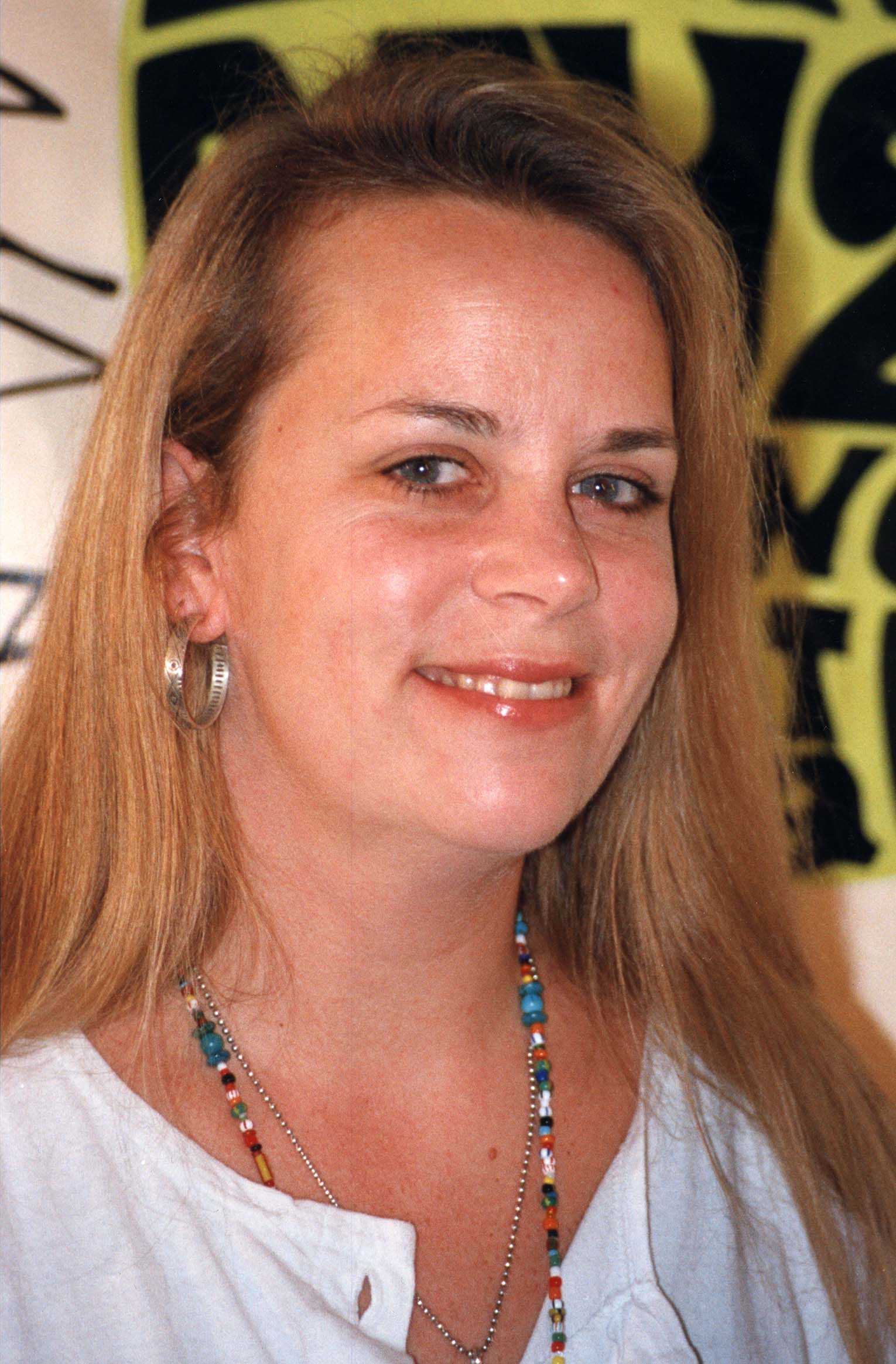
- Carpenter in 2010
Awards and nominations
Award	Wins	Nominations
Academy of Country Music Awards	3	11
Country Music Association Awards	2	10
Grammy Awards	5	18

Totals (Note: Certain award groups do not simply award one winner. They acknowledge several different recipients, have runners-up, and have third place. Since this is a specific recognition and is different from losing an award, runner-up mentions are considered wins in this award tally. For simplification and to avoid errors, each award in this list has been presumed to have had a prior nomination.)
- Wins: 9
- Nominations: 39

American country music and folk music singer Mary Chapin Carpenter has received five Grammy Awards, two Academy of Country Music Awards, and two Country Music Association Awards. Her first industry award win came in 1989, when she won Top New Female Vocalist from the Academy of Country Music. Her second came in 1992, when she won Female Vocalist of the Year from the Country Music Association. Carpenter won her first Grammy Award that same year, for Best Female Country Vocal Performance for her hit single "Down at the Twist and Shout".

== List of awards ==
Year	Association	Category	Nominated work	Result	Ref.
1989	Academy of Country Music Awards	Top New Female Vocalist	—N/a	Won	
1990	Academy of Country Music Awards	Top Female Vocalist	—N/a	Nominated	
1991	Country Music Association Awards	Horizon Award	—N/a	Nominated	
1991	Academy of Country Music Awards	Song of the Year	"Down at the Twist and Shout"	Nominated	
1991	Academy of Country Music Awards	Top Female Vocalist	—N/a	Nominated	
1991	Grammy Awards	Best Female Country Vocal Performance	"Quittin' Time"	Nominated	
1992	Country Music Association Awards	Female Vocalist of the Year	—N/a	Won	
1992	Country Music Association Awards	Single of the Year	"I Feel Lucky"	Nominated	
1992	Country Music Association Awards	Song of the Year	"Down at the Twist and Shout"	Nominated	
1992	Academy of Country Music Awards	Song of the Year	"I Feel Lucky"	Nominated	
1992	Academy of Country Music Awards	Album of the Year	Come On Come On	Nominated	
1992	Grammy Awards	Best Female Country Vocal Performance	"Down at the Twist and Shout"	Won	
1992	Grammy Awards	Best Country Song	"Down at the Twist and Shout"	Nominated	
1993	Country Music Association Awards	Female Vocalist of the Year	—N/a	Won	
1993	Country Music Association Awards	Album of the Year'	Come On Come On	Nominated	
1993	Academy of Country Music Awards	Top Female Vocalist	—N/a	Won	
1993	Grammy Awards	Best Female Country Vocal Performance	"I Feel Lucky"	Won	
1993	Grammy Awards	Best Country Song	"I Feel Lucky"	Nominated	
1993	Grammy Awards	Best Country Vocal Collaboration with Vocals	"Not Too Much to Ask" (with Joe Diffie)	Nominated	
1994	Country Music Association Awards	Female Vocalist of the Year	—N/a	Nominated	
1994	Country Music Association Awards	Single of the Year	"He Thinks He'll Keep Her"	Nominated	
1994	Country Music Association Awards	Song of the Year	"He Thinks He'll Keep Her"	Nominated	
1994	Academy of Country Music Awards	Top Female Vocalist	—N/a	Nominated	
1994	Academy of Country Music Awards	Album of the Year	Stones in the Road	Nominated	
1994	Grammy Awards	Best Female Country Vocal Performance	"Passionate Kisses"	Won	
1994	Grammy Awards	Best Country Collaboration with Vocals	"Romeo" (with Dolly Parton and friends)	Nominated	
1994	Grammy Awards	Best Country Song	"The Hard Way"	Nominated	
1995	Country Music Association Awards	Female Vocalist of the Year	—N/a	Nominated	
1995	Grammy Awards	Best Female Country Vocal Performance	"Shut Up and Kiss Me"	Won	
1995	Grammy Awards	Best Country Album	Stones in the Road	Won	
1995	Grammy Awards	Best Country Song	"Shut Up and Kiss Me"	Nominated	
1995	Grammy Awards	Record of the Year	"He Thinks He'll Keep Her"	Nominated	
1997	Grammy Awards	Best Female Country Vocal Performance	"Let Me into Your Heart"	Nominated	
2003	Grammy Awards	Best Country Collaboration with Vocals	"Flesh and Blood" (with Sheryl Crow and Emmylou Harris)	Nominated	
2008	Grammy Awards	Best Contemporary Folk Album	The Calling	Nominated	
2011	Grammy Awards	Best Contemporary Folk Album	The Age of Miracles	Nominated	
2022	Grammy Awards	Best Folk Album	One Night Lonely	Nominated	
2023	Academy of Country Music Awards	Poet's Award	—N/a	Won	

== See also ==
- Mary Chapin Carpenter discography
