= Party Doll and Other Favorites =

Compilation album by Mary Chapin Carpenter
- Released: May 25, 1999
- Genre: Country
- Length: 72:35
- Label: Columbia Nashville
- Producers: Blake Chancey; Mary Chapin Carpenter; Mark Isham; John Jennings

Mary Chapin Carpenter chronology
| A Place in the World (1996) | Party Doll and Other Favorites (1999) | Time* Sex* Love* (2001) |

Professional ratings
Review scores
| Source | Rating |
|---|---|
| AllMusic | 4/5 stars |
| Entertainment Weekly | A |
| Q | 3/5 stars |
| Robert Christgau | (dud) |
| Rolling Stone | 3/5 stars |

Party Doll and Other Favorites is the first compilation album by American singer-songwriter Mary Chapin Carpenter, released by Columbia Records on May 25, 1999. It comprises a mix of her greatest hits, several album cuts, and newly recorded tracks, including "Almost Home", which reached No. 22 on Billboard's Hot Country Songs chart and No. 85 on the Billboard Hot 100.

== Content ==
The collection uses live or special event recordings in place of the studio cuts in several cases, others like "I Feel Lucky" and "He Thinks He'll Keep Her" are the original album versions. Of the new material, "Almost Home" and "Wherever You Are" were both released as singles, respectively reaching No. 22 and No. 55 on the Billboard Hot Country Songs in 1999. The track "Can't Take Love for Granted" was taken from a live performance on Late Show with David Letterman; the song, originally a ballad appearing on her third album, Shooting Straight in the Dark, differed from the album version, in that it was performed as a rowdy, guitar-driven rock and roll performance.

Some of the songs on this album originally appeared on other sources. "Dreamland" previously appeared on the 1992 compilation 'Til Their Eyes Shine... The Lullaby Album, "Grow Old with Me" comes from Working Class Hero: A Tribute to John Lennon, and "10,000 Miles" comes from the 1996 film Fly Away Home. Carpenter produced most of the album with her usual producer, John Jennings, except for "Wherever You Are" and "Almost Home", which she produced with Blake Chancey, and "10,000 Miles", which was produced by Mark Isham.

== Track listing ==
All songs written by Mary Chapin Carpenter, except where noted.

1. "Can't Take Love for Granted" – 3:47
  - live recording from the Late Show with David Letterman - May 18, 1995
2. "Wherever You Are" – 4:16
3. "Down at the Twist and Shout" – 3:18
  - live recording from Super Bowl XXXI with BeauSoleil - January 1997
4. "I Feel Lucky" (Carpenter, Don Schlitz) – 3:31
5. "Dreamland" – 3:03
6. "Passionate Kisses" (Lucinda Williams) – 3:21
7. "Quittin' Time" (Roger Linn, Robb Royer) – 6:10
  - live recording from the Ryman Auditorium - November 1994
8. "This Shirt" – 3:47
9. "Grow Old with Me" (John Lennon) – 3:22
10. "He Thinks He'll Keep Her" (Carpenter, Schlitz) – 4:02
11. "I Take My Chances" (Carpenter, Schlitz) – 4:22
  - live recording at the Barrymore Theatre, Madison, Wisconsin - November 1998
12. "Shut Up and Kiss Me" – 3:41
13. "The Hard Way" – 4:54
  - from the PBS special In the Spotlight and the DVD/Video Jubilee: Live at Wolftrap
14. "10,000 Miles" (Traditional) – 6:11
  - from the film Fly Away Home
15. "Stones in the Road" – 4:34
  - live recording from Her Majesty's Theatre, London - December 4, 1994
16. "Almost Home" (Carpenter, Beth Nielsen Chapman, Annie Roboff) – 4:37
17. "Party Doll" (Mick Jagger) – 5:39

== Charts ==
=== Weekly charts ===
| Chart (1999) | Peak position |
|---|---|
| Australian Albums (ARIA) | 164 |
| US Billboard 200 | 43 |
| US Top Country Albums (Billboard) | 4 |

=== Year-end charts ===
| Chart (1999) | Position |
|---|---|
| US Top Country Albums (Billboard) | 30 |

== Certifications ==
| Region | Certification | Certified units/sales |
|---|---|---|
| United States (RIAA) | Gold | 500,000^{^} |
^{^} Shipments figures based on certification alone.
