= Polaroids: A Greatest Hits Collection =

Greatest hits album by Shawn Colvin
- Released: November 23, 2004
- Genre: Rock, contemporary folk
- Label: Columbia
- Producer: Shawn Colvin, John Leventhal

Shawn Colvin chronology
Whole New You (2001)	Polaroids: A Greatest Hits Collection (2004)	These Four Walls (2006)

Professional ratings
Review scores
Source	Rating
Allmusic	4.5/5 stars

Polaroids: A Greatest Hits Collection is a compilation album by American singer-songwriter and musician Shawn Colvin, released in 2004. The cover song, "I'll Be Back" by The Beatles, is unique to this collection.

== Track listing ==
Polaroids: A Greatest Hits Collection track listing
No.	Title	Writer(s)	Original album	Length
1.	"Steady On"	Shawn Colvin; John Leventhal	Steady On, 1989	4:56
2.	"Diamond in the Rough"	Colvin; Leventhal	Steady On	5:00
3.	"Shotgun Down the Avalanche"	Colvin; Leventhal	Steady On	5:01
4.	"Round of Blues"	Colvin; Larry Klein	Fat City, 1992	4:43
5.	"Polaroids"	Colvin	Fat City	5:49
6.	"I Don't Know Why"	Colvin	Fat City	4:37
7.	"Every Little Thing (He) Does Is Magic"	Sting	Cover Girl, 1994	3:17
8.	"This Must Be the Place (Naïve Melody)" (live)	David Byrne; Chris Frantz; Jerry Harrison; Tina Weymouth	Cover Girl	4:02
9.	"Sunny Came Home"	Colvin; Leventhal	A Few Small Repairs, 1996	4:25
10.	"You and the Mona Lisa"	Colvin; Leventhal	A Few Small Repairs	4:06
11.	"Get Out of This House"	Colvin; Leventhal	A Few Small Repairs	4:16
12.	"The Facts About Jimmy"	Colvin; Leventhal	A Few Small Repairs	5:24
13.	"Whole New You"	Colvin; Leventhal	Whole New You, 2001	4:02
14.	"A Matter of Minutes"	Colvin; Leventhal	Whole New You	5:08
15.	"I'll Be Back"	John Lennon & Paul McCartney	New recording	3:41
