= Live (Shawn Colvin album) =

Live album by Shawn Colvin
- Released: June 23, 2009
- Recorded: July 28–30, 2008
- Venue: Yoshi's San Francisco
- Label: Nonesuch

Shawn Colvin chronology
These Four Walls (2006)	Live (2009)	The Best of Shawn Colvin (2010)

Live is the second live album from Shawn Colvin. It was recorded between July 28–30, 2008 at Yoshi's San Francisco It was released by Nonesuch Records on June 23, 2009.

== Track listing ==
Songs written by Shawn Colvin and John Leventhal unless noted otherwise.

No.	Title	Writer(s)	Length
1.	"Polaroids"	Shawn Colvin	5:05
2.	"A Matter of Minutes"		4:31
3.	"Shotgun Down the Avalanche"		4:01
4.	"Twilight"	Jaime "Robbie" Robertson	3:07
5.	"Trouble"	Shawn Colvin; John Leventhal; Tom Littlefield	3:55
6.	"Tennessee"		4:01
7.	"Nothing Like You"		3:38
8.	"Sunny Came Home"		4:10
9.	"Fill Me Up"		3:28
10.	"Wichita Skyline"		3:42
11.	"I'm Gone"	Shawn Colvin	3:25
12.	"Ricochet in Time"	Shawn Colvin	4:10
13.	"Diamond in the Rough"		4:04
14.	"Crazy"	Brian Burton; Thomas DeCarlo Callaway-Burton; Gian Franco Reverberi; Gian Piero Reverberi	4:18
15.	"This Must Be the Place (Naïve Melody)"	David Byrne; Jerry Harrison; Chris Frantz; Tina Weymouth	4:44
Total length:			1:00:19
