= Live 88 =

Live 88 may refer to:

- Live '88 (Supertramp album)
- Live '88 (Shawn Colvin album)
- Live 88 (Ekatarina Velika album)
