= Holiday Songs and Lullabies =

Studio album by Shawn Colvin
- Released: October 27, 1998; Reprint on October 25, 2005
- Recorded: June 1998
- Genres: Christmas, contemporary folk, lullaby
- Length: 36:51
- Label: Columbia
- Producer: Doug Petty

Shawn Colvin chronology
A Few Small Repairs (1996)	Holiday Songs and Lullabies (1998)	Whole New You (2001)

Professional ratings
Review scores
Source	Rating
Allmusic	3/5 stars

Holiday Songs and Lullabies is a studio album by American singer-songwriter and musician Shawn Colvin. It was released in 1998 on Columbia Records.

== Tracks ==
1. "In the Bleak Midwinter" (Traditional) – 4:04
2. "Christmas Time Is Here" (Vince Guaraldi, Lee Mendelson) – 2:37
3. "Now the Day Is Over" (Traditional) – 1:47
4. "Rocking" (Traditional) – 2:33
5. "Windy Nights" (Robert Louis Stevenson, Alec Wilder) – 3:10
6. "All Through the Night" (Traditional) – 2:03
7. "Love Came Down at Christmas" (Traditional) – 3:04
8. "Silent Night" (Josef Mohr, Franz Gruber) – 3:22
9. "All the Pretty Li'l Horses" (Traditional) – 1:43
10. "Little Road to Bethlehem" (Michael Head, Margaret Rose) – 2:52
11. "Seal Lullaby" (Rudyard Kipling, Alec Wilder) – 2:29
12. "Evening Is a Little Boy/The Night Will Never Stay" (Eleanor Farjeon, Frances Frost, Alec Wilder) – 3:09
13. "The Christ Child's Lullaby" (Traditional) – 2:19
14. "Close Your Eyes" (Johannes Brahms, William Engvick) – 1:39

== Sequel ==
A sequel "The Starlighter" is due for release February 23, 2018

== Personnel ==
- Shawn Colvin – vocals, guitar
- Larry Campbell – mandolin, pedal steel guitar, fiddle
- Andy Hess – bass
- Ben Street – bass
- Mark Egan – bass
- Steuart Smith – guitar
- Shawn Pelton – drums
- Dan Petty – guitar, lap steel guitar
- Doug Petty – organ, piano
- Paul Frazier – background vocals
- Marlon Saunders – background vocals
- Jill Seifers – background vocals
- Clark Gayton – euphonium
- John Clark – French horn
- David Taylor – bass trombone
- Jim Pugh – trombone
- Kenny Rampton – flugelhorn
- John Owens – flugelhorn
- Alan J. Stepansky – cello
- Sandra Park – violin
- Sharon Yamada – violin
- Rebecca Young – viola
- Rev. Dan Willis – oboe

Production notes:

- Doug Petty – producer, arranger, string and brass arrangements
- Maurice Sendak – artwork
- Alec Wilder – arranger
- Aaron Keane – engineer
- Steve Addabbo – engineer
- Ray Martin – engineer
- Fred Remmert – engineer
- Noah Simon – assistant engineer
- George Morgan – assistant engineer
- Matt Kane – assistant engineer
- Joe Ferla – mixing
- Greg Calbi – mastering
- Neil Kellerhouse – design
- Mary Maurer – art direction, design
- Deborah Feingold – photography

== Chart positions ==
Year	Chart	Position
1998	The Billboard 200	181
