= The Best of Shawn Colvin =

2010 compilation album by Shawn Colvin

Compilation album by Shawn Colvin
- Released: July 20, 2010

Shawn Colvin chronology
Live (2009)	The Best of Shawn Colvin (2010)	Playlist: The Very Best of Shawn Colvin (2012)

The Best of Shawn Colvin is a compilation album by Shawn Colvin released on July 20, 2010.

== Track listing ==
1. "Never Saw Blue Like That"
2. "In the Bleak Mid-winter"
3. "Little Road to Bethlehem"
4. "Sunny Came Home"
5. "When the Rainbow Comes"
6. "Every Little Thing (He) Does Is Magic"
7. "One Cool Remove"
8. "If These Walls Could Speak"
9. "Get Out of This House"
10. "Steady On"
11. "Wichita Skyline"
12. "You and the Mona Lisa"
13. "A Matter of Minutes"
14. "Now the Day Is Over"
15. "Polaroids"
16. "Shotgun Down the Avalanche"
