= So Good to See You =

So Good to See You may refer to:

- "So Good to See You", a song by Cheap Trick from the album In Color
- "So Good to See You", a song by Shawn Colvin from the album These Four Walls
