= You Win Again =

You Win Again may refer to:

- You Win Again (album), a 2000 album by Van Morrison and Linda Gail Lewis
- "You Win Again" (Bee Gees song), 1987
- "You Win Again" (Hank Williams song), 1952
- "You Win Again" (Mary Chapin Carpenter song)
- "You Win Again", a song by Jason Raize
- "So You Win Again", a 1977 song by Hot chocolate
- "You Win Again" (Nashville), a 2013 TV episode
