= Colvin & Earle =

Studio album by Shawn Colvin and Steve Earle
- Released: June 10, 2016
- Studio: Buddy's House
- Genres: Americana, folk
- Length: 33:45
- Language: English
- Label: Fantasy
- Producer: Buddy Miller

Shawn Colvin chronology
| Uncovered (2015) | Colvin & Earle (2016) | The Starlighter (2018) |

Steve Earle chronology
| Terraplane (2015) | Colvin & Earle (2016) | So You Wanna Be an Outlaw (2017) |

Colvin & Earle is a studio album from American folk and roots musicians Shawn Colvin and Steve Earle, released in 2016. The recording is a product of a decades-long friendship between the two singer-songwriters and has garnered positive critical reception.

== Recording and release ==
Shawn Colvin and Steve Earle first met in the mid-1980s, when Earle was on tour and Colvin was an opening act and she first met album producer Buddy Miller in the 1970s. The two became friends and Colvin covered Earle's song "Someday" on her 1994 album Cover Girl. This project was inaugurated by Colvin, who reached out to Earle to collaborate in 2014, initially planning on only touring together. The duo participated in three songwriting sessions and chose a few covers to perform to make up the album. The track "You’re Still Gone" was begun by Miller's wife Julie Miller and completed by Colvin and Earle; this is a departure for Earle, who had not typically co-written before. The duo promoted this album with a tour and the singles "You're Right (I'm Wrong)" and "Come What May".

== Reception ==
The editorial staff of AllMusic Guide gave this album 3.5 out of five stars, with reviewer Mark Deming for having "a lively and spontaneous atmosphere", with production that creates "a sound that's rich but doesn't sound fussed over". Robin Denselow of The Guardian gave the album three out of five stars, noting the versatility of Earle's musicianship. For NPR's First Listen, Jewly Hight gave a positive review that highlighted the unique blending of the performers' strengths, summing up, "tousled nature of their mutuality makes [the album] arresting". In American Songwriter, Hal Horowitz scored this album 3.5 out of five stars for the "alluring, attractive pairing" of the musicians and producer, along with the craftsmanship of the backing band.

== Track listing ==
1. "Come What May" (Shawn Colvin and Steve Earle) – 3:13
2. "Tell Moses" (Colvin and Earle) – 3:41
3. "Tobacco Road" (John D. Loudermilk) – 2:50
4. "Ruby Tuesday" (Jagger/Richards) – 3:35
5. "The Way That We Do" (Colvin and Earle) – 4:21
6. "Happy and Free" (Colvin and Earle) – 2:17
7. "You Were on My Mind" (Sylvia Fricker) – 2:57
8. "You’re Right (I’m Wrong)" (Colvin and Earle) – 4:14
9. "Raise the Dead" (Emmylou Harris) – 2:51
10. "You’re Still Gone" (Colvin, Earle, and Julie Miller) – 3:40

Bonus tracks on deluxe edition

11. "Someday" (Earle) – 3:52
12. "That Don’t Worry Me Now" (Colvin and John Leventhal) – 3:16
13. "Baby's in Black" (Lennon/McCartney) – 2:23

== Personnel ==
- Shawn Colvin – guitar, vocals
- Steve Earle – guitar, vocals, mandolin, bouzouki, mandocello, harmonica
- Richard Bennett – guitar
- Andrew Darby – mastering assistance
- Collin Dupuis – engineering, mixing at Club Roar
- Fred Eltringham – drums, percussion
- Adam Grover – mastering assistance
- Stephanie Hamood – engineering assistance
- Timothy Hogan – logo design
- Kelley Looney – bass guitar on "You're Right (I'm Wrong)" and "Raise the Dead"
- Andrew Mendelson – mastering at Georgetown Masters
- Buddy Miller – guitar, harmonium, production
- Gabe Millman – mastering assistance
- Carrie Smith – package design
- Alexandra Valenti – photography
- Chris Wood – bass guitar

== See also ==
- List of 2016 albums
