= Time* Sex* Love* =

Studio album by Mary Chapin Carpenter
- Released: May 29, 2001
- Recorded: November 2000–January 2001
- Studios: AIR (London, UK)
- Genre: Country
- Label: Columbia Nashville
- Producers: Mary Chapin Carpenter; Blake Chancey; John Jennings

Mary Chapin Carpenter chronology
Party Doll and Other Favorites (1999)	Time* Sex* Love* (2001)	The Essential Mary Chapin Carpenter (2003)

Professional ratings
Aggregate scores
Source	Rating
Metacritic	(81/100)
Review scores
Source	Rating
About.com	(favorable)
AllMusic	4/5 stars
Billboard	(favorable)
Entertainment Weekly	B−
Los Angeles Times	2.5/4 stars
Q	4/5 stars
Rolling Stone	3.5/5 stars

Time* Sex* Love* is the seventh studio album by American singer-songwriter Mary Chapin Carpenter, released by Columbia Nashville on May 29, 2001. It rose to No. 6 on the Billboard Country Albums chart and produced two singles: "Simple Life," which peaked at No. 53 on the Hot Country Songs chart, and "This Is Me Leaving You", which failed to chart. Despite its low airplay ranking, "Simple Life" spent 28 weeks on Billboard's Top 25 Country Singles Sales chart, peaking at No. 8 on May 5, 2001.

The album was recorded at George Martin's AIR Studios in London.

The asterisks in the title refer to a comment producer John Jennings made about the album's content: "Time is the great gift; sex is the great equalizer; love is the great mystery"

== Track listing ==
All tracks are written by Mary Chapin Carpenter; co-writers as indicated.

No.	Title	Writer(s)	Length
1.	"Whenever You're Ready"	Gary Burr	6:04
2.	"Simple Life"		3:50
3.	"Swept Away"	Kim Richey	4:47
4.	"Slave to the Beauty"		5:09
5.	"Maybe World"	Burr	3:52
6.	"What Was It Like"	Burr	4:01
7.	"King of Love"		5:23
8.	"This Is Me Leaving You"	John Jennings	3:45
9.	"Someone Else's Prayer"		4:34
10.	"The Dreaming Road"		6:20
11.	"Alone but Not Lonely"		4:24
12.	"The Long Way Home"		4:54
13.	"In the Name of Love"		4:20
14.	"Late for Your Life"		5:38

Hidden track
No.	Title	Length
15.	"Goin' Home" (starting at 7:00 after 1:22 silence on track 14)	5:45
Total length:		72:46

== Personnel ==
- Mary Chapin Carpenter - acoustic guitar, lead vocals, background vocals
- Jon Carroll - Hammond organ, piano, synthesizer, background vocals, Wurlitzer
- David Daniels - cello
- Isobel Griffiths - arranger, conductor, contractor
- Nick Ingman - arranger, conductor, string arrangements
- John Jennings - clevenger bass, 12-string electric guitar, acoustic guitar, baritone guitar, electric guitar, hi-string guitar, percussion, programming, slide guitar, tambourine, background vocals
- Russ Powell - guitar
- Patrick Kiernan - violin
- Boguslaw Kostecki - violin
- Peter Lale - viola
- Duke Levine - 12-string electric guitar, 12-string acoustic guitar, electric guitar, mandola, electric sitar, slide guitar
- Rita Manning - violin
- Dave Mattacks - drums, percussion
- Steve Nathan - piano, synthesizer
- Tony Pleeth - cello
- Garrison Starr - background vocals
- Mike Thompson - French horn
- Brice White - viola
- Glenn Worf - bass guitar, clevenger bass, fretless bass
- Gavyn Wright - violin

== Charts ==
=== Weekly charts ===
Chart (2001)	Peak position
Australian Albums (ARIA)	164
US Billboard 200	52
US Top Country Albums (Billboard)	6

=== Year-end charts ===
Chart (2001)	Position
Canadian Country Albums (Nielsen SoundScan)	86
US Top Country Albums (Billboard)	47
