= Julie Speed =

American artist

- Born: 1951 (age 74–75); Chicago, Illinois, U.S.
- Known for: Contemporary art

Julie Speed (born 1951) is an American artist. After dropping out of Rhode Island School of Design at age 19, Speed spent her twenties moving around the U.S. and Canada working pickup jobs (house painter, horse trainer, ad writer, farm worker, etc.) until moving to Texas in 1978, where she settled down and taught herself to paint. She switches back and forth regularly between oil painting, printmaking, collage, gouache and drawing, often combining disciplines. Two large volumes of her work, Julie Speed, Paintings, Constructions and Works on Paper, 2004 and Speed, Art 2003-2009 have been published by the University of Texas. She lives and works in Marfa, Texas. In her words, “I keep hours just like a real job, only longer, and in my spare time I read books, drink tequila, and garden.”

She is also known for painting the album cover for the Shawn Colvin album A Few Small Repairs.

== Style and technique ==
Speed paints surreal scenes in a realistic style with oil and gouache. Her collages incorporate scientific illustrations and architectural drawings. In collaboration with her husband Fran Christina, and Flatbed Press in Austin, Texas, she creates limited edition etchings.

Julie Speed, LUCKY, 2013

"Speed’s work has been described as surrealist, hallucinogenic, iconoclastic and absurdist. Her detailed microorganism paintings, such as Blue or Metamporphoses, bring to mind the intricate scientific prints of Ernst Haeckel. The disquiet of her portraits, particularly the Hostage and Jawbone series, evoke the unflinching pathos of Otto Dix. Her continued reference to Renaissance themes and images combine the allegory of Bosch and Bruegel with the flatness usually found in Mexican primitivism. And yet, none of these influences begin to encapsulate the strangeness of Speed’s work. Speed’s unique vision is most pronounced in collage, although this term is inadequate to fully describe her compositions, which combine etching, gouache, mixed media, ink, and found paper. The animating spirit of her work lies in the spirit of collage — even her paintings seem to stem from some incongruous “other” place, a hidden layer hovering imperceptibly in the background, immediately jarring the viewer. “

-Leigh Baldwin ( February 2013) “Force of Confusion” published by The Southwest School of Art, San Antonio

"Julie Speed is a neo-Surrealist whose inspirations range from old master and Mughal painting to that of 20th-century master of arcana, John Graham…... Lovable this imagery isn't, but it grows on you, largely because Ms. Speed's grasp of it is firm and her technical mastery impressive.”

-Grace Glueck (January 2006). " Art in Review” New York Times

Barbara Rose, writing in the Gerald Peters Gallery catalog in April 2005, described Speed's artistic style as iconoclastic and incongruous, comparing her to an outsider artist.

Barbara Rose (April 2005) “Julie Speed, Iconoclast” published by the Gerald Peters Gallery, NY.

== Solo exhibitions ==
- 2019-2020 Julie Speed: East of the Sun & West of the Moon The Taubman Museum of Art, Roanoke, Virginia
- 2018-2019 Julie Speed: East of the Sun & West of the Moon El Paso Museum of Art, El Paso, Texas
- 2017, Excerpts from the Undertoad: Julie Speed LHUCA (Louise Hopkins Underwood Center for the Arts) Lubbock, Texas
- 2016-17 Julie Speed, Evoke Contemporary, Santa Fe, N.M.
- 2016 Julie Speed: Undertoad The International Museum of Art & Science, McAllen, Texas
- 2016 Julie Speed: Undertoad Ruiz-Healy Art, San Antonio, Texas and Flatbed Press, Austin, Texas
- 2014 Julie Speed- Paper Cut: Selected Works on Paper The Grace Museum, Abilene, Texas
- 2013 Julie Speed: Cut-up, Southwest School of Art, San Antonio
- 2012-2013 Julie Speed: Snug Harbor, Nicolaysen Art Museum, Casper, Wyoming and The Longview Museum of Art, Longview, Texas
- 2011 The Pirate Queen Flatbed Press, Austin, Texas
- 2011 Julie Speed, Boxes and Collages 2011 and The Pirate Queen & Other New Etchings Gerald Peters Gallery, New York, N.Y.
- 2010 Julie Speed: Not From Here, Gerald Peters Gallery, New York, N.Y.
- 2008 Julie Speed, George Billis Gallery, New York, New York
- 2008 Julie Speed, George Billis Gallery, Los Angeles, California
- 2007 Talking Room, Galleri Urbane, Marfa, Texas
- 2007 Bible Studies, Westby Gallery, Rowan University, New Jersey
- 2006 Heads, Gerald Peters Gallery, Dallas, Texas
- 2006 Bible Studies, Gerald Peters Gallery, Dallas, Texas
- 2005 Bible Studies, Gerald Peters Gallery, Dallas, Texas
- 2005 Bible Studies, Flatbed Press, Austin, Texas
- 2005 Bible Studies, Galleri Urbane, Marfa, Texas
- 2005 Julie Speed, Gerald Peters Gallery, New York, New York
- 2004 Julie Speed, Blue Star Contemporary Art Center, San Antonio, Texas
- 2004 Julie Speed: Squares, Gerald Peters Gallery, Dallas, Texas
- 2003 The Murder of Kassimer Malevich, Etherington Fine Art, Vineyard Haven, Massachusetts
- 2003 Alters of My Ancestors, Art House, Jones Center for Contemporary Art, Austin Texas
- 2003 Alters of My Ancestors, Art Museum of Southeast Texas, Beaumont, Texas
- 2002 Alters of My Ancestors, Pillsbury and Peters Fine Art, Dallas, Texas
- 2002 Alters of My Ancestors, Lawndale Art Center, Houston, Texas
- 2002 Pillsbury and Peters, Dallas, Texas
- 2000 McMurtrey Gallery, Houston, Texas
- 2000 Queen of My Room: A Survey of Work by Julie Speed, 1989-1999, Dallas Visual Art Center, Dallas, Texas
- 2000 Queen of My Room: A Survey of Work by Julie Speed, 1989-1999, Galveston Arts Center, Galveston, Texas
- 2000 Queen of My Room: A Survey of Work by Julie Speed, 1989-1999, South Texas Institute for the Arts, Corpus Christi, Texas
- 1999 Queen of My Room: A Survey of Work by Julie Speed, 1989-1999, Austin Museum of Art, Austin, Texas
- 1997 McMurtrey Gallery, Houston, Texas
- 1997 Allene LaPides Gallery, Santa Fe, New Mexico
- 1996 Allene LaPides Gallery, Santa Fe, New Mexico
- 1995 Davidson Gallery, Seattle, Washington
- 1995 Tarrytown Gallery, Austin, Texas
- 1994 Carrington-Gallagher Gallery, San Antonio, Texas
- 1994 Ron Hall Gallery, Dallas, Texas
- 1993 Jansen-Perez Gallery, San Antonio, Texas
- 1992 Tarrytown Gallery, Austin, Texas
- 1991 Guerilla Gallery, Austin, Texas
- 1990 Scott-Allan Gallery, New York, New York
- 1989 Joy Horwitch Gallery, Chicago, Illinois
- 1989 J.B. Tollett Gallery, Austin, Texas

== Other publications ==
- 2018 Julie Speed : East of the Sun & West of the Moon https://www.amazon.com/dp/1532384750/ref=cm_sw_em_r_mt_dp_U_5cw-CbP1QEPC7 published by the El Paso Museum of Art by Dr. Patrick Cable Shaw, preface by Victoria Ramirez, EPMA director
- Julie Speed: Snug Harbor Julie Speed, Lisa Hatchadoorian: 9780979848575: Amazon.com: Books https://www.amazon.com/dp/0979848571/ref=cm_sw_em_r_mt_dp_U_kiw-Cb430HDBB
- Paintings, Constructions, and Works on Paper, 2004, University of Texas Press. ISBN 978-0-292-70272-1. Includes color plates of 100 works, essays by art historians Elizabeth Ferrer and Edmund P. Pilsbury, and selected excerpts from "Books of Conversation" where Speed answers questions from the museum-goers.
- Texas Monthly Talks. Interview with Evan Smith for KLRU-TV, Austin, Texas
- "Behind the veil: visions of third eyes, dismembered body parts, monkeys and more appear to Julie Speed - and she paints them", 2005, Southwest Art.
- Speed: art, 2003-2009, 2009, University of Texas Press. ISBN 978-0-292-71994-1. Includes color plates of Speed's works, fiction by A. M. Homes, essay by art historian Elizabeth Ferrer, and essay by Julie Speed.
- Queen of Her Room (trt: 27.28) A portrait of Julie Speed, visual artist and poet, for Gallery HD. Produced and Directed by Karen Bernstein
- Austin Now, Julie Speed produced by Domenique Bellavia KLRU television
- "I [art] Marfa", exilés artistiques au Texas 3/5, Episode 2: Julie Speed, artiste by Katie Callan et Sebastien Carayol, Produit par: Petit Dragon, en association avec ARTE France 3/7/2014
- A (Third) Eye for Detail by Antoine Sanfuentes MSNBC.msn.com
