= Live '88 (Shawn Colvin album) =

Live album by Shawn Colvin
- Released: October 1995
- Genre: Rock, contemporary folk
- Length: 44:09
- Label: Plump Records
- Producer: Carol Young

Shawn Colvin chronology
Cover Girl (1994)	Live '88 (1995)	A Few Small Repairs (1996)

Professional ratings
Review scores
Source	Rating
Allmusic	4.5/5 stars

Live '88 is a live album by American singer-songwriter and musician Shawn Colvin, released in 1995.

== Track listing ==
1. "Diamond in the Rough" (Shawn Colvin, John Leventhal) – 4:21
2. "Shotgun Down the Avalanche" (Colvin, Leventhal) – 4:00
3. "I Don't Know Why" (Colvin) – 3:54
4. "Cry Like an Angel" (Colvin, Leventhal) – 4:26
5. "Ricochet in Time" (Colvin) – 3:16
6. "Another Long One" (Colvin) – 3:18
7. "Stranded" (Colvin) – 4:31
8. "Something to Believe In" (Colvin, Leventhal) – 5:20
9. "Don't You Think I Feel It Too" (Dave Ball) – 3:25
10. "Kathy's Song" (Paul Simon) – 3:52
11. "Knowing What I Know Now" (Colvin, Leventhal) – 3:46

== Personnel ==
- Shawn Colvin – vocals, guitar

Production notes:

- Carol Young – producer
- Darleen Wilson – engineer
- Chris Dixon – engineer
- David Thoener – engineer, mixing
- Steve Addabbo – remixing
- Scott Hull – digital editing
- Greg Calbi – mastering
- Melissa Bailey – art direction
- Jackson Browne – liner notes
- A. Prack – photography
