= Going Out Tonight =

Single by Mary Chapin Carpenter

from the album Shooting Straight in the Dark
- B-side: "When She's Gone"
- Released: September 1991
- Genre: Country
- Length: 3:16
- Label: Columbia
- Songwriters: Mary Chapin Carpenter; John Jennings
- Producers: Mary Chapin Carpenter; John Jennings

Mary Chapin Carpenter singles chronology
"Down at the Twist and Shout" (1991)	"Going Out Tonight" (1991)	"I Feel Lucky" (1992)

"Going Out Tonight" is a song co-written and recorded by American country music artist Mary Chapin Carpenter. It was released in September 1991 as the fourth single from her album Shooting Straight in the Dark. The song reached number 14 on the Billboard Hot Country Singles & Tracks chart in January 1992. It was written by Carpenter and John Jennings.

== Chart performance ==
Chart (1991–1992)	Peak position
Canada Country Singles (RPM)	13
US Hot Country Songs (Billboard)	14
