= Right Now (Gene Vincent song) =

Single by Mary Chapin Carpenter

from the album Shooting Straight in the Dark
- B-side: "What You Didn't Say"
- Released: January 1991
- Genre: Country
- Length: 2:36
- Label: Columbia
- Songwriters: Al Lewis; Sylvester Bradford
- Producers: Mary Chapin Carpenter; John Jennings

Mary Chapin Carpenter singles chronology
"You Win Again" (1990)	"Right Now" (1991)	"Down at the Twist and Shout" (1991)

"Right Now" is a song written by Al Lewis and Sylvester Bradford, and recorded by rock and roll singer Gene Vincent and his Blue Caps on 15 December 1957. The song was not released until 1959, when the Blue Caps had disbanded.

== Mary Chapin Carpenter recording ==
It was covered by American country music artist Mary Chapin Carpenter. It was released in January 1991 as the second single from her album Shooting Straight in the Dark. The song reached number 15 on the Billboard Hot Country Singles & Tracks chart in April 1991.

== Chart performance ==
Chart (1991)	Peak position
Canada Country Singles (RPM)	14
US Hot Country Songs (Billboard)	15
