= Uncovered (Shawn Colvin album) =

Studio album by Shawn Colvin
- Released: September 25, 2015
- Recorded: Arlyn Studios, Austin; Hobo Sound, Weehawken, NJ
- Genre: Soft rock; folk
- Length: 52:13
- Label: Concord; Fantasy
- Producer: Steuart Smith, Stewart Lerman

Shawn Colvin chronology
All Fall Down (2012)	Uncovered (2015)	Colvin & Earle (2016)

Professional ratings
Review scores
Source	Rating
AllMusic	3/5 stars

Uncovered is the ninth studio album by American singer Shawn Colvin. The work consists of cover songs from other notable musicians.

The album debuted at No. 175 on Billboard 200, selling around 3,000 copies in the first week. It has sold 12,000 copies in the United States as of May 2016.

== Track listing ==
1. "Tougher Than the Rest" (Bruce Springsteen) – 4:26
2. "American Tune" (Paul Simon) – 3:59
3. "Baker Street" (Gerry Rafferty) – 4:30
4. "Hold On" (Tom Waits, Kathleen Brennan) – 4:18
5. "I Used to Be a King" (Graham Nash) – 5:09
6. "Private Universe" (Neil Finn) – 3:54
7. "Heaven Is Ten Zillion Light Years Away" (Stevie Wonder) – 5:12
8. "Gimme Little Sign" (Joseph Hooven, Alfred Smith, Jerry Winn) – 3:10
9. "Acadian Driftwood" (Robbie Robertson) – 6:30
10. "Lodi" (John Fogerty) – 3:12
11. "Not a Drop of Rain" (Robert Earl Keen) – 4:34
12. "'Til I Get It Right" (Larry Henley, Red Lane) – 3:19

== Personnel ==
- Shawn Colvin – vocals, guitar
- David Crosby – vocals ("Baker Street")
- Marc Cohn – vocals ("Gimme Little Sign")
- Glenn Fukunaga – bass
- Mike Meadows – percussion
- David Boyle – keyboards
- Milo Deering – pedal steel, lap steel, mandola
- Steuart Smith – guitar, keyboards, bass ("American Tune")

Production:

- Produced by Steuart Smith, Stewart Lerman
- Recorded by Stewart Lerman
- Assisted by Joseph Holquin, Jacob Sciba
- Additional Engineering by Steve Mazur, Sean Kelly
- Mixed by Stewart Lerman
- Mastered by Paul Blakemore

== Chart positions ==
Chart (2015–16)	Peak position
Spanish Albums (PROMUSICAE)	82
US Billboard 200	175
US Americana/Folk Albums (Billboard)	7
US Top Rock Albums (Billboard)	30
