= Almost Home (Mary Chapin Carpenter song) =

Single by Mary Chapin Carpenter

from the album Party Doll and Other Favorites
- B-side: "Dancing in the Dark" (live)
- Released: April 13, 1999
- Length: 4:37
- Label: Columbia
- Songwriters: Mary Chapin Carpenter; Beth Nielsen Chapman; Annie Roboff
- Producers: Mary Chapin Carpenter; Blake Chancey

Mary Chapin Carpenter singles chronology
"Keeping the Faith" (1997)	"Almost Home" (1999)	"Wherever You Are" (1999)

"Almost Home" is a song co-written and recorded by American country music singer Mary Chapin Carpenter. It was released in April 1999 as the first single from her compilation album, Party Doll and Other Favorites. It peaked at number 22 on the Billboard Hot Country Songs chart, and is her last Top 40 country hit.

== Content ==
The song is a mid-tempo about a woman who "takes stock of a life lived and comes up short". It is in the key of B-flat major with an approximate tempo of 96 beats per minute and a chord pattern of F-B♭-E♭-B♭. Carpenter wrote the song with Beth Nielsen Chapman and Annie Roboff, and produced it with Blake Chancey.

== Critical reception ==
Deborah Evans Price of Billboard reviewed the single with favor, saying that "it's a vibrant musical outing that could signal a return to prominence for this talented singer/songwriter. Carpenter's evocative vocals infuse any song with passion and integrity, and she's particularly effective on this poignant lyric." Alanna Nash of Entertainment Weekly also described the song favorably in her review of the album, saying that it "scores the highest at marrying lyrical introspection and rhythmic yearning, one of the benchmarks of her graceful, if circuitous, career."

== Personnel ==
From Party Doll and Other Favorites liner notes.

- Ava Aldridge - background vocals
- Pat Buchanan - electric guitar
- Mary Chapin Carpenter - acoustic guitar, vocals
- Jon Carroll - background vocals
- Beth Nielsen Chapman - background vocals
- John Jennings - acoustic guitar, background vocals
- Duke Levine - electric guitar
- Greg Morrow - drums
- Michael Rhodes - bass guitar
- Tom Roady - percussion
- Annie Roboff - background vocals
- Matt Rollings - piano, organ
- Cindy Walker - background vocals
- Reggie Young - electric guitar

== Chart performance ==
Chart (1999)	Peak position
Canada Country Singles (RPM)	45
US Hot Country Songs (Billboard)	22
US Billboard Hot 100	85
