= Steady On: 30th Anniversary Acoustic Edition =

Studio album by Shawn Colvin
- Released: September 13, 2019
- Recorded: Arlyn Studios, Austin, Texas, United States
- Genre: Folk
- Length: 44:42
- Language: English
- Label: SLC Recordings

Shawn Colvin chronology
The Starlighter (2018)	Steady On: 30th Anniversary Acoustic Edition (2019)

Steady On: 30th Anniversary Acoustic Edition is a studio album by American folk musician Shawn Colvin, released in 2019. It is a re-recording of her 1989 debut album, Steady On.

== Recording and release ==
Colvin decided to re-record her debut album after her manager noted that Rodney Crowell had successfully recorded acoustic versions of his songs. Colvin also wanted to present the music as she originally conceived and heard it herself, recording the tracks with guitar and vocals together, live in studio. She promoted the re-release on a tour with Mary Chapin Carpenter in 2019.

== Reception ==
Linda Fahey of Folk Alley considers the re-recordings to be full of "incredibly expressive guitar backing her utterly emotive voice", which showcases the strength of the songwriting. Tim Martin of Americana UK considers this release a more "timeless setting" for the songs than the 1980s sound of production on the original release of Steady On; his review rates this album seven out of 10. A Glide Magazine review calls several tracks "exemplary, authentic jewels of Americana" that are expressed by the stripped-down re-recording. PopMatters notes that listeners "can hear the true majesty of the material and witness the full range of her formidable creative powers" on this new album.

== Track listing ==
All songs written by Shawn Colvin and John Leventhal, except where noted:

1. "Steady On" – 5:04
2. "Diamond in the Rough" – 4:33
3. "Shotgun Down the Avalanche" – 4:54
4. "Stranded" (Colvin) – 4:35
5. "Another Long One" (Colvin) – 4:23
6. "Cry Like an Angel" – 4:43
7. "Something to Believe In" – 3:45
8. "The Story" – 4:08
9. "Ricochet in Time" (Colvin) – 3:30
10. "The Dead of the Night" (Colvin) – 5:00

== Personnel ==
- Shawn Colvin – acoustic guitar, vocals
- Chris Allgood – assistant mastering
- Jordan Fann – art direction
- Emily Lazar – mastering at The Lodge, New York
- Jacob Sciba – recording
- Deidre Schoo – photography
- LaRon Stewart – art direction
- Simon Tassano – mixing at Rumiville Studio

== See also ==
- List of 2019 albums
