= All Fall Down (Shawn Colvin album) =

Studio album by Shawn Colvin
- Released: June 5, 2012
- Recorded: 2011–12 at Buddy's
- Genre: Folk; soft rock
- Length: 41:41
- Label: Nonesuch
- Producer: Buddy Miller

Shawn Colvin chronology
These Four Walls (2006)	All Fall Down (2012)	Uncovered (2015)

Professional ratings
Review scores
Source	Rating
Allmusic	4/5 stars

All Fall Down is the eighth studio album by recording artist Shawn Colvin, released in 2012. The album is Colvin's second studio release on Nonesuch Records and features collaborations with Emmylou Harris and Patty Griffin.

== Track listing ==
1. "All Fall Down" (Shawn Colvin, John Leventhal) – 3:49
2. "American Jerusalem" (Rod MacDonald) – 5:14
3. "Knowing What I Know Now" (Colvin, Leventhal) – 3:24
4. "Seven Times the Charm" (Colvin, Leventhal, Jakob Dylan) – 4:26
5. "Anne of the Thousand Days" (Colvin, Bill Frisell) – 4:26
6. "The Neon Lights of the Saints" (Colvin, Leventhal) – 2:55
7. "Change Is on the Way" (Colvin, Patty Griffin) – 3:16
8. "I Don't Know You" (Colvin, Viktor Krauss) – 3:32
9. "Fall of Rome" (Colvin, Kenny White) – 3:54
10. "Up On That Hill" (Mick Flannery) – 3:44
11. "On My Own" (B. W. Stevenson) – 3:01

== Chart positions ==
Chart (2012)	Peak position
Billboard 200	126

== Reception ==
Rolling Stone's Will Hermes gave the album three stars out of five, saying the music heals, and particularly praising the song "American Jerusalem", which he says "will resonate for anyone who ever hated the Big Apple, even for a New York minute".
