= You Win Again (Mary Chapin Carpenter song) =

Single by Mary Chapin Carpenter

from the album Shooting Straight in the Dark
- B-side: "Moon and St. Christopher"
- Released: October 1990
- Genre: Country
- Length: 3:59
- Label: Columbia
- Songwriter: Mary Chapin Carpenter
- Producers: John Jennings; Mary Chapin Carpenter

Mary Chapin Carpenter singles chronology
"Something of a Dreamer" (1990)	"You Win Again" (1990)	"Right Now" (1991)

"You Win Again" is a song written and recorded by American country music singer Mary Chapin Carpenter. It was released in October 1990 as the first single from the album Shooting Straight in the Dark. The song reached number 16 on the Billboard Hot Country Singles & Tracks chart and number 6 on the RPM Country Tracks in Canada.

== Music video ==
The music video was directed by Bill Pope and premiered in early 1991.

== Chart performance ==
Chart (1990–1991)	Peak position
Canada Country Singles (RPM)	6
US Hot Country Songs (Billboard)	16

=== Year-end charts ===
Chart (1991)	Position
Canada Country Tracks (RPM)	78
