= Shooting Straight in the Dark =

Studio album by Mary-Chapin Carpenter
- Released: October 9, 1990
- Studios: Bias Studios, Springfield, Virginia
- Genre: Country
- Length: 42:12
- Label: Columbia Nashville/TriStar
- Producers: Mary Chapin Carpenter; John Jennings

Mary-Chapin Carpenter chronology
State of the Heart (1989)	Shooting Straight in the Dark (1990)	Come On Come On (1992)

Singles from Shooting Straight in the Dark
- 1. "You Win Again" Released: October 1990; 2. "Right Now" Released: January 1991; 3. "Down at the Twist and Shout" Released: June 3, 1991; 4. "Going Out Tonight" Released: September 1991

Professional ratings
Review scores
Source	Rating
AllMusic	4.5/5 stars
Entertainment Weekly	A−

Shooting Straight in the Dark is the third studio album by American singer-songwriter Mary Chapin Carpenter, released by Columbia Records on October 9, 1990. It rose to No. 11 on the Billboard's Country Albums chart, with four of its tracks reaching the Hot Country Songs chart: "You Win Again" (No. 16), "Right Now" (No. 15), "Down at the Twist and Shout" (No. 2), and "Going Out Tonight" (No. 14).

Members of the Cajun band BeauSoleil provide guest instrumentation on "Down at the Twist and Shout". Shawn Colvin provided backing vocals on three of the album's songs.

== Track listing ==
All songs written by Mary Chapin Carpenter unless noted.

No.	Title	Writer(s)	Length
1.	"Going Out Tonight"	Carpenter, John Jennings	3:16
2.	"Right Now"	Al Lewis, Sylvester Bradford	2:36
3.	"The More Things Change"		3:56
4.	"When She's Gone"		5:05
5.	"Middle Ground"		3:51
6.	"Can't Take Love for Granted"		4:01
7.	"Down at the Twist and Shout"		3:21
8.	"Halley Came to Jackson"		3:10
9.	"What You Didn't Say"		4:36
10.	"You Win Again"		3:59
11.	"The Moon and St. Christopher" (duet with Shawn Colvin)		4:21
Total length:			42:12

== Personnel ==
Credits from album liner notes.

- Peter Bonta – acoustic guitar on "Down at the Twist and Shout", keyboards on "Can't Take Love for Granted", piano on "Halley Came to Jackson"
- Jimmy Breaux – Acadian accordion and Cajun yells on "Down at the Twist and Shout"
- Mary Chapin Carpenter – lead and backing vocals, acoustic guitar, producer
- Jon Carroll – piano on "Right Now", backing vocals on "The More Things Change"
- Shawn Colvin – backing vocals on "Middle Ground", duet vocals on "The Moon and St. Christopher"
- Mike Cotter – backing vocals
- Don Dixon – bass guitar on "Right Now", backing vocals on "Right Now"
- Michael Doucet – fiddle on "Down at the Twist and Shout", Cajun yells on "Down at the Twist and Shout"
- John Jennings – electric and acoustic guitars, bass guitar, synthesizer, backing vocals, Cajun yells, producer
- Marti Jones – backing vocals on "Right Now" and "Middle Ground"
- Robbie Magruder – drums
- John McCutcheon – hammer dulcimer on "Halley Came to Jackson"
- Mark O'Connor – fiddle on "Halley Came to Jackson"
- Dave Palamar – drums on "Right Now"
- Herb Pedersen – backing vocals on "Halley Came to Jackson"
- Rico Petruccelli – bass guitar
- Matt Rollings – piano
- Vince Santoro – drums on "Middle Ground"
- Billy Ware – percussion on "Down at the Twist and Shout", Cajun yells on "Down at the Twist and Shout"

== Chart performance ==
Chart (1989–1990)	Peak position
Australian Albums (ARIA)	111
US Billboard 200	70
US Top Country Albums (Billboard)	11
