= Steve Addabbo =

American songwriter and record producer

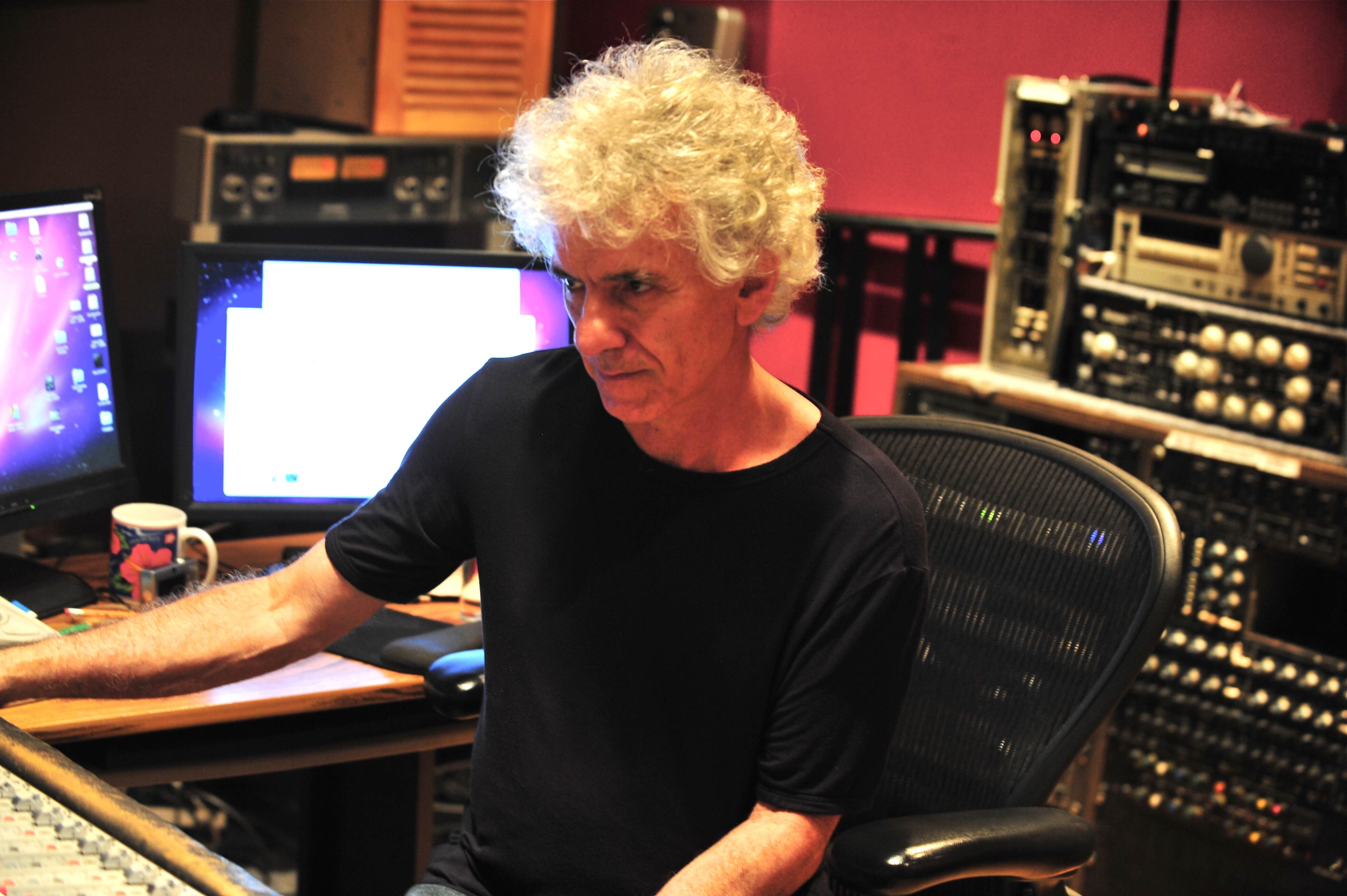
- Addabbo at Shelter Island Sound in New York City, 2013

Background information
- Born: The Bronx, New York City, U.S.
- Genres: Rock; folk; country; pop
- Occupations: Record producer; songwriter; audio engineer; guitarist; studio owner
- Years active: 1972–present
- Website: steveaddabbo.com, shelterislandsound.com

Steve Addabbo is an American record producer, songwriter and audio engineer, who helped launch the careers of Suzanne Vega and Shawn Colvin. He had a vital hand in Vega's hit single, "Luka" and Colvin's album Steady On.

== Career ==
He has produced and/or engineered for artists including Bobby McFerrin, Bob Dylan, Eric Andersen, Loudon Wainwright III, Jeff Buckley, Gary Lucas, Lara Bello, Richard Barone, The Bongos, Robby Romero and Red Thunder, Richard Shindell, Suzanne Vega, Ana Egge and The Stray Birds, Chiara Civello, Jane Olivor, Olivia Newton-John, The Manhattans and Dar Williams.

Addabbo is also an acclaimed mix engineer who has, among other projects, mixed the Bob Dylan box sets Bootleg 10: Another Self Portrait and Bootleg 12: The Cutting Edge for which he received a Grammy Award. More recently he has mixed the Dylan Bootleg 13, Trouble No More and Bootleg 14, More Blood, More Tracks.

Addabbo released his first full-length album Out of Nothing in 2016, 14 songs written or co-written by him.

Recent projects include Richard Barone's Sorrows and Promises: Greenwich Village in the 60s and the Robby Romero track "Born on the REZ" recorded with Dennis Banks, Robert Mirabal and Kris Kristoffersen honoring the Standing Rock Movement.

== Shelter Island Sound ==
In the late 1980s, Addabbo learned that Celestial Sound was up for sale, and he and Ron Fierstein purchased the studio's equipment and used it to set up a recording studio in the basement of Addabbo's house in Shelter Island, New York, appropriately naming the studio Shelter Island Sound, and eventually moving it out of the house and into a more centralized location on 21st Street in New York City.

Around 2003, Fierstein retired from the music business and Addabbo bought him out. The studio's landlord, wanting to convert the 21st Street building into high-end condominiums, refused to renew the lease, and the studio established a new location at 40 West 27th Street, where the recording studio has operated ever since.

== Selected works ==
- Bob Dylan - The Bootleg Series Vol 14: More Blood, More Tracks (November, 2018)
- Bob Dylan - The Bootleg Series Vol.13: Trouble No More 1979-1981 (November 2017)
- Jeff Buckley - You and I (released March 2016) and In Transition (released April 2019)
- Bob Dylan - The Bootleg Series Vol. 10: Another Self Portrait (1969–1971) (released August 2013)
- Bob Dylan - The Bootleg Series Vol. 12: The Cutting Edge 1965-1966 (released November 2015)
- Bobby McFerrin - Spirityouall
- Global Noize - A Prayer for the Planet
- Suzanne Vega - "Left of Center"
- Suzanne Vega - Solitude Standing, Suzanne Vega
- Shawn Colvin - Steady On, Live '88, Cover Girl, Acoustic Christmas (Have Yourself a Merry Little Christmas)
- Richard Shindell - Blue Divide, Sparrow's Point
- Olivia Newton-John - Christmas Wish
- Ana Egge - Lazy Days, Bright Shadows
- Eric Andersen - You Can't Relive the Past, Ghosts Upon the Road, Stages: The Lost Album
- Richard Barone - Glow
- Richard Barone - Sorrows & Promises: Greenwich Village in the 1960s (released October 2016)
- Jane Olivor - Love Decides
