= Not Too Much to Ask =

Single by Mary Chapin Carpenter with Joe Diffie

from the album Come On Come On
- B-side: "I Am a Town"
- Released: September 1992
- Genre: Country
- Length: 3:24
- Label: Columbia
- Songwriters: Mary Chapin Carpenter; Don Schlitz
- Producers: Mary Chapin Carpenter; John Jennings

Mary Chapin Carpenter singles chronology
"I Feel Lucky" (1992)	"Not Too Much to Ask" (1992)	"Passionate Kisses" (1993)

Joe Diffie singles chronology
"Next Thing Smokin'" (1992)	"Not Too Much to Ask" (1992)	"Startin' Over Blues" (1992)

"Not Too Much to Ask" is a song recorded by American country music artists Mary Chapin Carpenter and Joe Diffie. It was released in September 1992 as the second single from Carpenter's album Come On Come On. The song reached number 15 on the Billboard Hot Country Singles & Tracks chart in December 1992. It was nominated for a 1993 Grammy Award for Best Country Collaboration with Vocals. It was written by Carpenter and Don Schlitz.

== Critical reception ==
David Browne of Entertainment Weekly gave the song a negative review, calling it "a delicate acoustic ballad that doesn't set off as many sparks as the collaboration promises."

== Chart performance ==
Chart (1992)	Peak position
Canada Country Singles (RPM)	12
US Hot Country Songs (Billboard)	15
