= You and the Mona Lisa =

"You and The Mona Lisa"

Single by Shawn Colvin

from the album A Few Small Repairs
- Released: September 23, 1997
- Recorded: 1996
- Genre: Pop, rock, folk
- Length: 4:05 (album version)
- Label: Columbia Records
- Songwriters: Shawn Colvin; John Leventhal
- Producer: John Leventhal

Shawn Colvin singles chronology
"Sunny Came Home" (1997)	"You and The Mona Lisa" (1997)	"Nothin' on Me" (1998)

"You and The Mona Lisa" is a folk-rock song by American musician Shawn Colvin. The song was released in September 1997 as the third single from her album, A Few Small Repairs. "You and The Mona Lisa" was the follow-up to her 1997 hit, "Sunny Came Home".

== Music video ==
The music video for "You and The Mona Lisa" was directed by Nancy Bardawil. The video was posted to VH1.com on September 16, 1997, and added it to VH1's television rotation during the final week of September 1997. In addition to "You and The Mona Lisa", VH1 also added Sugar Ray's "Fly", Robyn's "Show Me Love", and Usher's "You Make Me Wanna..." to its on-air rotation during the same week.

== Review ==
Billboard Magazine praised the single in its review on September 20, 1997, calling it "slightly more subtle in its musical approach [than "Sunny Came Home"], but no less satisfying." Billboard continued, writing that "You and The Mona Lisa," "...packs a satisfying punch, as Colvin's intimate is surrounded by the required acoustic strumming and splashes of blues-spiced horn and harmonica lines. As the song builds to a lively, rock-edged climax, it's easy to imagine this hit-bound tune over and over again on the radio. If you have yet to investigate the artist's fine current album, A Few Small Repairs, use this single as an excuse to finally do so."

== Chart ==
Chart (1997)	Peak position
US Adult Contemporary (Billboard)	24
US Adult Pop Songs (Billboard)	31
