= Fat City (Shawn Colvin album) =

Studio album by Shawn Colvin
- Released: October 27, 1992
- Recorded: Larry Klein's House
- Length: 55:34
- Label: Columbia
- Producers: Larry Klein; John Leventhal; Shawn Colvin; Kenny White; David Kahne

Shawn Colvin chronology
Steady On (1989)	Fat City (1992)	Cover Girl (1994)

Fat City is the second studio album by American singer-songwriter Shawn Colvin. It was released on October 27, 1992, on Columbia Records.

Fat City peaked at number 142 on the US Billboard 200 and at number 2 on Billboard's Top Heatseekers chart. From the album, "Round of Blues" and "I Don't Know Why" charted on Billboard's Modern Rock Tracks and Adult Contemporary single charts, respectively. "Tenderness on the Block" is a cover version of a song released on Warren Zevon's 1978 album Excitable Boy. Opening track "Polaroids" provided the title of Colvin's greatest hits album Polaroids: A Greatest Hits Collection, which was released in 2004.

== Songwriting ==
In an interview with Performing Songwriter magazine, Colvin described how she co-wrote songs for Fat City:

The way that I generally co-write is that someone else writes the music or part of the music. Like on "Round of Blues" I wrote the whole song but Larry Klein said that it needed a bridge. So he wrote the bridge and I wrote the words to it. But Elly [Brown] and I really shared every part of ["Set the Prairie on Fire"] equally. She wrote some of the words, I wrote some of the words, she wrote some of the music, I wrote some of the music.

== Reception ==
Professional ratings
Review scores
Source	Rating
AllMusic	4/5 stars
Chicago Tribune	3.5/4 stars
Q	3/5 stars
Rolling Stone	4/5 stars
The Village Voice	C

In Rolling Stone, Stacey D'Erasmo described Fat City as "a fatter, happier record" than Colvin's 1989 debut Steady On and commended "her ability to convey the ambivalent wonder of meeting happiness as if for the first time."

== Track listing ==
No.	Title	Writer(s)	Length
1.	"Polaroids"	Shawn Colvin	5:53
2.	"Tennessee"	Colvin; John Leventhal	4:21
3.	"Tenderness on the Block"	Jackson Browne; Warren Zevon	5:05
4.	"Round of Blues"	Colvin; Larry Klein	4:47
5.	"Monopoly"	Colvin	4:25
6.	"Orion in the Sky"	Colvin; Klein	6:38
7.	"Climb On (A Back That's Strong)"	Colvin; Leventhal	4:16
8.	"Set the Prairie on Fire"	Colvin; Elly Brown	7:01
9.	"Object of My Affection"	Colvin; Leventhal	3:53
10.	"Kill the Messenger"	Colvin	4:36
11.	"I Don't Know Why"	Colvin	4:37

== Personnel ==
- Shawn Colvin – guitar, vocals
- Bruce Hornsby – piano, background vocals
- David Lindley – Hawaiian guitar, bazouki, lap steel Guitar
- Joni Mitchell – percussion
- The Subdudes – vocals
- Richard Thompson – guitar
- Chris Whitley – National Steel guitar (8)
- Tommy Malone – guitar, background vocals
- Valerie Carter – background vocals
- Jim Keltner – drums
- Alex Acuña – percussion
- Steve Amedee – drums, background vocals
- Robin Batteau – background vocals
- Larry Campbell – fiddle, pedal steel
- Mary Chapin Carpenter – background vocals
- Vinnie Colaiuta – drums
- Denny Fongheiser – drums
- Béla Fleck – banjo
- Milt Grayson – background vocals
- Richie Hayward – drum brushes
- Curtis King – background vocals
- Larry Klein – bass, percussion, guitar, keyboards, drum programming
- Greg Leisz – pedal steel
- John Leventhal – guitar, bass, percussion
- John Magnie – accordion, background vocals
- Bill Payne – organ
- Jeff Pevar – guitar
- Steuart Smith – guitar
- Fonzi Thornton – background vocals
- Ken White – keyboards, background vocals
- Vinnie Zummo – guitar
- Johnny Ray Allen – bass
- Booker T. Jones – Hammond organ

== Charts ==
Chart performance for Fat City
Chart (1992/1993)	Peak position
Australian Albums (ARIA)	137
United Stated Albums (Billboard 200)	142
