= Whole New You =

Studio album by Shawn Colvin
- Released: March 27, 2001
- Genre: Folk; pop rock
- Length: 44:32
- Label: Columbia
- Producer: John Leventhal

Shawn Colvin chronology
Holiday Songs and Lullabies (1998)	Whole New You (2001)	These Four Walls (2006)

Professional ratings
Review scores
Source	Rating
AllMusic	4/5 stars
Robert Christgau	(dud)
Rolling Stone	3/5 stars

Whole New You is the sixth studio album by American singer-songwriter Shawn Colvin, released in 2001 by Columbia Records. It was her first new release in over four years. While A Few Small Repairs is "her divorce album", Whole New You is about family, commitment, and acceptance. The album retains the sixties folk-pop feel provided by collaborator John Leventhal, with Rolling Stone writing that the title track "expertly renovates antique Sixties teen pop." According to William Ruhlmann of AllMusic, "The most interesting song is the most complex one," "Another Plane Went Down".

== Track listing ==
All tracks are written by Shawn Colvin and John Leventhal, except where noted.

Standard edition
No.	Title	Writer(s)	Length
1.	"A Matter of Minutes"		3:50
2.	"Whole New You"		4:01
3.	"Nothing Like You"		3:14
4.	"Anywhere You Go"		3:34
5.	"Bonefields"		4:29
6.	"Another Plane Went Down"		5:35
7.	"Bound to You"		3:33
8.	"Roger Wilco"	Colvin; Leventhal; Edie Brickell	3:56
9.	"Mr. Levon"		4:08
10.	"One Small Year"		4:08
11.	"I'll Say I'm Sorry Now"		2:23

Borders exclusive edition
No.	Title	Writer(s)	Length
12.	"Fall of Rome"	Colvin; Kenny White	5:07

== Personnel ==
=== Musicians ===
- Shawn Colvin – vocals
- John Leventhal – banjo, bass, guitar, percussion, keyboards
- Tony Garnier – double bass
- Joe Quigley – bass
- Shawn Pelton – drums, percussion
- Marc Cohn – background vocals
- James Taylor – harmony vocals
- Kenny White – background vocals
- Rick DePofi – clarinet, piccolo, recorder, sax
- Joe Bonadio – percussion, drum fills
- Michael Rhodes – bass
- Sandra Park – violin
- Fiona Simon – violin
- Robert Rinehart – viola
- Eileen Moon – cello
- Larry Farrell – trombone
- Tony Kadleck – flugelhorn
- Alan J. Stepansky – cello

=== Technical ===
- John Leventhal – producer, engineer, horn arrangements, string arrangements
- Rick DePofi – engineer
- Bob Clearmountain – mixing
- David Boucher – engineer, mixing
- Fred Remmert – engineer
- Craig Bishop – engineer
- Gina Fant-Saez – engineer
- Matt Kane – engineer
- Tom Schick – engineer
- Noah Simon – engineer
- Bob Ludwig – mastering
- Stephen Barber – string arrangements

=== Design ===
- Kate Breakey – photography
- Mary Maurer – art direction
- Frank Ockenfels – photography

== Charts ==
Chart (2001)	Peak position
US Billboard 200	101
US Top Internet Albums (Billboard)	5
