= I Take My Chances =

Single by Mary Chapin Carpenter

from the album Come On Come On
- B-side: "Come On Come On"
- Released: April 25, 1994
- Genre: Country
- Length: 3:45 (album version); 3:19 (radio edit)
- Label: Columbia
- Songwriters: Mary Chapin Carpenter; Don Schlitz
- Producers: Mary Chapin Carpenter; John Jennings

Mary Chapin Carpenter singles chronology
"He Thinks He'll Keep Her" (1994)	"I Take My Chances" (1994)	"Shut Up and Kiss Me" (1994)

"I Take My Chances" is a song co-written and recorded by American country music artist Mary Chapin Carpenter. It was released in April 1994 as the seventh and final single from her album Come On Come On. The song reached number 2 on the Billboard Hot Country Singles & Tracks chart in July 1994. It was written by Carpenter and Don Schlitz.

== Personnel ==
Credits are adapted from the liner notes of Come On Come On.

- Mary Chapin Carpenter – vocals, acoustic guitar
- Jon Carroll – piano
- Denny Dadmun-Bixby – bass guitar
- John Jennings – electric guitar, background vocals
- Robbie Magruder – drums
- Benmont Tench – Hammond organ

== Critical reception ==
Deborah Evans Price, of Billboard magazine reviewed the song favorably, saying that it "achieves the perfect balance of intellect and accessibility."

== Chart performance ==
"I Take My Chances" debuted at number 62 on the U.S. Billboard Hot Country Singles & Tracks for the week of May 1, 1994.

Chart (1994)	Peak position
Canada Country Singles (RPM)	2
US Hot Country Songs (Billboard)	2

=== Year-end charts ===
Chart (1994)	Position
Canada Country Tracks (RPM)	65
US Country Songs (Billboard)	42
