= He Thinks He'll Keep Her =

Single by Mary-Chapin Carpenter

from the album Come On Come On
- B-side: "Only a Dream"
- Released: December 6, 1993
- Recorded: 1992
- Genre: Country
- Length: 4:01 (album version)
- Label: Columbia
- Songwriters: Mary Chapin Carpenter, Don Schlitz
- Producers: Mary Chapin Carpenter, John Jennings

Mary-Chapin Carpenter singles chronology
"The Bug" (1992)	"He Thinks He'll Keep Her" (1993)	"I Take My Chances" (1994)

"He Thinks He'll Keep Her" is a song co-written and recorded by American country music artist Mary Chapin Carpenter. It was released in December 1993 as the sixth single from the album Come On Come On. The song peaked at No. 2 on the Billboard Hot Country Songs chart. It was written by Carpenter and Don Schlitz.

The song was nominated for the Grammy Award for Record of the Year, and was accompanied by a live performance music video, taken from the 1993 CBS special Women of Country, where Carpenter was accompanied by Emmylou Harris, Kathy Mattea, Patty Loveless, Trisha Yearwood, Suzy Bogguss and Pam Tillis.

== Composition ==
In a 1992 interview with the Chicago Tribune, Carpenter stated that the song's title was inspired by a 1970s Geritol TV commercial in which a man points to his wife’s many accomplishments and attributes, and then concludes with "My wife...I think I'll keep her". The song describes the life of a woman who marries at age 21 and has three children by the age of 29; over the following few years, she begins to realize that she's dissatisfied with her life. At age 36, the wife informs her husband that she is no longer in love with him and leaves him. In the chorus's bridge, Carpenter describes the housewife's having worked for 15 years without a raise, and now has a minimum-wage job in an office typing pool. Music critic David Browne, writing for Entertainment Weekly, observed that the song's subject tied into a recurring theme on Come On, Come On of "women caught between tradition and contemporary roles who realize that the solution lies with their own inner resolve".

The song's backing vocals have been compared to a metronome, regarded as a reference to the lyric "Everything runs right on time" in the refrain. Its instrumentation has been described as "standard" and similar to that of many other country songs of the time, with steel guitars and keyboards.

== Personnel ==
Credits are adapted from the liner notes of Come On Come On.

- Mary Chapin Carpenter – vocals, acoustic guitar
- Bob Glaub – bass guitar
- John Jennings – electric guitar, background vocals
- John Jorgenson – electric guitar
- Andy Newmark – drums
- Matt Rollings – piano
- Benmont Tench – Hammond organ

== Music video ==
The music video – a live performance of the song with backing vocals by (in left-to-right order when looking at the stage) Emmylou Harris, Kathy Mattea, Trisha Yearwood, Pam Tillis, Patty Loveless, and Suzy Bogguss, was taken from the CBS television special Women of Country with Bud Schaetzle as director, which was filmed in 1993 and premiered early the next year.

== Reception ==
=== Commercial ===
The single became Carpenter's sixth top ten hit on the Billboard Hot Country Songs chart, peaking at number two on the chart dated March 26, 1994. It spent twenty weeks on the chart, and tied with "Down at the Twist and Shout" for her highest-peaking single at the time, matched a few weeks later (May 1, 1994) by "I Take My Chances", and surpassed later that year (November 18, 1994), when her "Shut Up and Kiss Me" reached number one.

The single became Carpenter's fifth top ten hit on the Billboard Country Airplay chart, where it peaked at number two the same month. It also became, following "Down at the Twist and Shout", her second song to peak at number two on that chart as well.

The single was placed at number sixteen on Billboard's year-end Hot Country Songs chart in 1994.

== Chart positions ==
Chart (1993–1994)	Peak position
Canada Country Singles (RPM)	6
US Hot Country Songs (Billboard)	2

UK: #71

=== Year-end charts ===
Chart (1994)	Position
Canada Country Tracks (RPM)	74
US Country Songs (Billboard)	16
