= The Starlighter =

Studio album by Shawn Colvin
- Released: February 23, 2018
- Genre: Children's music, folk
- Length: 39:11
- Language: English
- Label: SLC Recordings
- Producer: Doug Petty

Shawn Colvin chronology
Colvin & Earle (2016)	The Starlighter (2018)	Steady On: 30th Anniversary Acoustic Edition (2019)

The Starlighter is a studio album from American folk musician Shawn Colvin, released in 2018 to positive critical reception.

== Reception ==
In Relix, Lee Zimmerman called Colvin a "superb interpreter of outside material" and considers this album "a nice listen" for children and adults. The editorial staff of AllMusic Guide gave this album scored The Starlighter 3.5 out of five stars, with reviewer Stephen Thomas Erlewine noting the care that Colvin took in choosing from the Lullabies and Night Songs songbook, orchestrating the music, and ultimately coming up with a recording that is "a cozy, comforting place between attentive and background listening", which is ideal for lullabies. For PopMatters, Will Layman rated this album a seven out of 10, praising the diversity of instrumentation and arrangements by Doug Petty.

== Track listing ==
The Starlighter track listing
No.	Title	Lyrics	Music	Length
1.	"The Starlighter"	Arthur Guiterman	Doug Petty; Alec Wilder	3:06
2.	"Raisins and Almonds"	Traditional	Petty	3:07
3.	"Go Tell Aunt Rhody"	Traditional	Petty	3:08
4.	"Minnie and Winnie"	Alfred Lord Tennyson	Petty; Wilder	3:23
5.	"Sleep Baby Sleep"	Traditional	Traditional	2:02
6.	"Many Million Years Ago"	William Engvick	Petty; Wilder	3:57
7.	"The Huntsman"	Walter de la Mare	Wilder	3:06
8.	"The Cuckoo"	Traditional	Shawn Colvin; Petty; Wilder	1:51
9.	"Night"	Lois W. McKay	Petty; Wilder	3:00
10.	"The Journey"	Engvick	Petty; Wilder	2:53
11.	"Bobby Shaftoe"	Traditional	Traditional	1:53
12.	"The Nut Tree"	Traditional	Traditional	2:37
13.	"Hush Little Baby"	Traditional	Colvin; Petty; Wilder	3:08
14.	"Cradle Song"	William Blake	Colvin; Petty; Wilder	1:53

== Personnel ==
- Shawn Colvin – arrangement on "The Cuckoo", "Hush Little Baby", and "Cradle Song"; acoustic guitar; vocals
- Carlos Castro – engineering, mixing
- Joseph Holquin – assistant engineering
- Martin Hughes – artwork
- Tim Lefebvre – bass guitar
- Dan Petty – guitar
- Doug Petty – production; arrangement on "The Starlighter", "Raisins and Almonds", "Go Tell Aunt Rhody", "Minnie and Winnie", "Many Million Years Ago", "The Huntsman", "The Cuckoo", "Hush Little Baby", and "Cradle Song"; Hammond organ, piano
- Scott Sedillo – mastering
- Jacob Sciba – assistant engineering
- Aaron Sterling – drums, percussion
- Mick Taras – guitar
- Alec Wilder – arrangement on "Raisins and Almonds", "Go Tell Aunt Rhody", "Sleep Baby Sleep", "Night", "The Journey", "Bobby Shaftoe", "The Nut Tree", and "Hush Little Baby"

== See also ==
- List of 2018 albums
