= Come On Come On =

Studio album by Mary Chapin Carpenter
- Released: June 30, 1992
- Recorded: 1992
- Studios: Bias Studios, Springfield, Virginia
- Genre: Country
- Length: 49:36
- Label: Columbia Nashville/TriStar
- Producers: Mary Chapin Carpenter; John Jennings; Steve Buckingham

Mary Chapin Carpenter chronology
Shooting Straight in the Dark (1990)	Come On Come On (1992)	Stones in the Road (1994)

Singles from Come On Come On
- 1. "I Feel Lucky" Released: May 18, 1992; 2. "Not Too Much to Ask" Released: September 1992; 3. "Passionate Kisses" Released: January 19, 1993; 4. "The Hard Way" Released: March 1993; 5. "The Bug" Released: August 9, 1993; 6. "He Thinks He'll Keep Her" Released: December 6, 1993; 7. "I Take My Chances" Released: April 25, 1994

Come On Come On is the fourth studio album by American singer-songwriter Mary Chapin Carpenter, released by Columbia Records on June 30, 1992. It rose to No. 11 on the Billboard's Country Albums chart and No. 31 on the Billboard 200, with seven of its tracks reaching the Hot Country Songs chart: "I Feel Lucky" (No. 4), "Not Too Much to Ask" (a duet with Joe Diffie, No. 15), "Passionate Kisses" (a cover of the Lucinda Williams song, No. 4), "The Hard Way" (No. 11), "The Bug" (a cover of the Dire Straits song, No. 16), "He Thinks He'll Keep Her" (No. 2), and "I Take My Chances" (No. 2). "Passionate Kisses" also reached No. 57 on the Billboard Hot 100.

By 2017, the album had sold 2.9 million copies. It remains Carpenter's best-selling album.

Professional ratings
Review scores
Source	Rating
AllMusic	4.5/5 stars
Chicago Tribune	3.5/4 stars
Entertainment Weekly	A
Los Angeles Times	3/4 stars
Q	4/5 stars
Rolling Stone	2.5/5 stars

== Track listing ==
All songs written by Mary Chapin Carpenter except where noted.

No.	Title	Writer(s)	Length
1.	"The Hard Way"		4:22
2.	"He Thinks He'll Keep Her"	Carpenter, Don Schlitz	4:01
3.	"Rhythm of the Blues"		3:49
4.	"I Feel Lucky"	Carpenter, Schlitz	3:31
5.	"The Bug"	Mark Knopfler	3:47
6.	"Not Too Much to Ask" (duet with Joe Diffie)	Carpenter, Schlitz	3:23
7.	"Passionate Kisses"	Lucinda Williams	3:23
8.	"Only a Dream"		5:34
9.	"I Am a Town"		5:06
10.	"Walking Through Fire"		4:04
11.	"I Take My Chances"	Carpenter, Schlitz	3:45
12.	"Come On Come On"		3:51
Total length:			49:36

== Production ==
- Produced by Mary Chapin Carpenter and John Jennings except "The Bug", which was produced by Mary Chapin Carpenter, John Jennings, and Steve Buckingham.
- Recorded and mixed by Bob Dawson and Marshall Morgan
- Engineered by Toby Seay

== Personnel ==
Adapted from Come On Come On liner notes.

- J. T. Brown – bass guitar (4, 5), background vocals (4)
- Mary Chapin Carpenter – acoustic guitar (1–3, 7, 9, 11, 12), vocals
- Jon Carroll – piano (4, 6, 11), synthesizer (1), background vocals (4)
- Rosanne Cash – background vocals (3)
- Shawn Colvin – background vocals (1, 7, 12)
- Denny Dadmun-Bixby – bass guitar (1, 11)
- Joe Diffie – duet vocals (6)
- Jerry Douglas – Dobro (6)
- Paul Franklin – pedal steel guitar (5, 6), Pedabro (5)
- Indigo Girls (Amy Ray and Emily Saliers) – background vocals (1, 10)
- Bob Glaub – bass guitar (2, 7, 10)
- John Barlow Jarvis – piano (9)
- John Jennings – electric guitar (1, 2, 4–6, 11), acoustic guitar (3–6, 10, 12), bass guitar (3, 6, 12), percussion (3), programming (3), background vocals (1–5, 10–12)
- John Jorgenson – electric guitar (2, 7, 10)
- Robbie Magruder – drums (1, 4–6, 11)
- Mike McAdam – electric guitar (4–6), tremolo guitar (6)
- Edgar Meyer – double bass (9)
- Andy Newmark – drums (2, 7, 10)
- Matt Rollings – piano (1–3, 7, 8, 10, 12)
- Benmont Tench – Hammond organ (2, 3, 10, 11)

== Chart performance ==
=== Weekly charts ===
Chart (1992)	Peak position
Australian Albums (ARIA)	162
Canadian Country Albums (RPM)	4
US Billboard 200	31
US Top Country Albums (Billboard)	6

=== Year-end charts ===
Chart (1993)	Position
US Top Country Albums (Billboard)	11
Chart (1994)	Position
US Billboard 200	87
US Top Country Albums (Billboard)	16
Chart (1995)	Position
US Top Country Albums (Billboard)	43

=== Singles ===
Billboard

Year	Song	Chart	Peak Position
1992	"I Feel Lucky"	Country Singles	4
1992	"Not Too Much To Ask"	Country Singles	15
1992	"Passionate Kisses"	Country Singles	4
1993	"He Thinks He'll Keep Her"	Hot Country Songs	2
1993	"Passionate Kisses"	Adult Contemporary	11
1993	"Passionate Kisses"	Hot 100	57
1993	"The Bug"	Country Singles	16
1993	"The Hard Way"	Country Singles	11
1994	"He Thinks He'll Keep Her"	Country Singles	2
1994	"I Take My Chances"	Country Singles	2
