= Sunny Came Home =

1997 single by Shawn Colvin

- US and Australian CD artwork

Single by Shawn Colvin

from the album A Few Small Repairs
- B-side: "What I Get Paid For"
- Released: February 4, 1997
- Studio: Shelter Island
- Genre: Folk rock
- Length: 4:24
- Label: Columbia
- Songwriters: Shawn Colvin; John Leventhal
- Producer: John Leventhal

Shawn Colvin singles chronology
"Get Out of This House" (1996)	"Sunny Came Home" (1997)	"You and the Mona Lisa" (1997)

Music video
- "Shawn Colvin - Sunny Came Home" on YouTube

"Sunny Came Home" is a folk-rock song by American musician Shawn Colvin. It is the opening track on her 1996 concept album, A Few Small Repairs. The song was serviced to contemporary hit radio in the US on February 4, 1997, and was released commercially on June 24. In the United Kingdom, the song was released in July 1997 but did not chart until a re-release in May 1998.

"Sunny Came Home" was a commercial success, reaching number seven on the US Billboard Hot 100 to become Colvin's first entry and first top-10 single on the chart. In Canada, the song peaked at number three, while in Iceland, it reached number 20. The song was also a critical success, winning the Grammy Awards for Record of the Year and Song of the Year, and it was additionally nominated for Best Female Pop Vocal Performance.

== Background and composition ==
It was the last song to be written, or for me to put lyrics to, on that record. I had already chosen the cover of the record, which was a painting by a dear friend of mine, Julie Speed. And there’s a woman, obviously, with a match. A lit match, and what appears to be a huge fire in the background – in the far, far, background – and I thought, why don’t you write a story about her?

— Shawn Colvin, in an interview about the song

Shawn Colvin was inspired to write the lyrics of "Sunny Came Home" by the painting she had chosen for the album cover, which shows a woman with a lit match in her hand. The song is written in the key of B minor (with its chorus in D major) in common time with a tempo of 84 beats per minute. Colvin's vocals span from F♯_{3} to B_{4} in the song.

== Chart performance ==
"Sunny Came Home" is Colvin's only hit, peaking at number seven on the Billboard Hot 100 in the United States and topped the Billboard Adult Contemporary chart for four weeks. Colvin's record label did not plan to release the track as a retail single until it became an airplay favorite on contemporary hit radio as well as adult contemporary and adult alternative radio stations. "Sunny Came Home" also became a major hit in Canada, reaching number three on the RPM Top Singles chart for two weeks and peaking atop the RPM Adult Contemporary chart for three weeks. Outside North America, the song became a moderate hit, peaking at number 29 in the United Kingdom, number 44 in Australia and number 90 in Germany.

== Awards ==
At the 1998 Grammy Awards, "Sunny Came Home" was named Song of the Year and Record of the Year. Rapper Ol' Dirty Bastard interrupted the Grammy Awards presentation by protesting Puff Daddy beating his group, Wu-Tang Clan, for Best Rap Album that year, saying "Wu-Tang is for the children. We teach the children. You know what I mean?", while Colvin was about to receive her award. The song was also nominated for Best Female Pop Vocal Performance, losing to Sarah McLachlan's "Building a Mystery".

== Track listings ==
All songs were written by Shawn Colvin and John Leventhal unless otherwise noted.

US CD and cassette single

1. "Sunny Came Home" – 4:24
2. "What I Get Paid For" (Colvin, Neil Finn) – 3:23

UK CD1

1. "Sunny Came Home"
2. "Get Out of This House" (live)
3. "The Facts About Jimmy" (live)
4. "You and the Mona Lisa" (live)

UK CD2

1. "Sunny Came Home"
2. "Tennessee" (live)
3. "Ricochet in Time" (live) (Colvin)
4. "Shotgun Down the Avalanche" (live)

UK cassette single

1. "Sunny Came Home"
2. "You and the Mona Lisa" (live)

European CD single

1. "Sunny Came Home"
2. "Get Out of This House" (live)

Australian CD single

1. "Sunny Came Home"
2. "What I Get Paid For" (Colvin, Finn)
3. "Every Little Thing He Does Is Magic" (Sting)
4. "Steady On"
5. "Round of Blues" (album version) (Colvin, Larry Klein)

== Charts ==
=== Weekly charts ===
Chart (1997–1998)	Peak position
Australia (ARIA)	44
Canada Top Singles (RPM)	3
Canada Adult Contemporary (RPM)	1
Germany (GfK)	90
Iceland (Íslenski Listinn Topp 40)	20
Scottish Singles Sales (Official Charts)	29
UK Singles (Official Charts)	29
UK Airplay (Media Control UK)	44
US Billboard Hot 100	7
US Adult Alternative Airplay (Billboard)	2
US Adult Contemporary (Billboard)	1
US Adult Pop Airplay (Billboard)	1
US Pop Airplay (Billboard)	4

=== Year-end charts ===
Chart (1997)	Position
Canada Top Singles (RPM)	26
Canada Adult Contemporary (RPM)	8
US Billboard Hot 100	39
US Adult Contemporary (Billboard)	6
US Adult Top 40 (Billboard)	3
US Top 40/Mainstream (Billboard)	19
US Triple-A (Billboard)	3

== Release history ==
Region	Date	Format(s)	Label(s)	Ref(s).
United States	February 4, 1997	Contemporary hit radio	Columbia	
United States	June 24, 1997	CD; cassette	Columbia	
United Kingdom	July 28, 1997	CD1; cassette	Columbia	
United Kingdom	August 4, 1997	CD2	Columbia	
United Kingdom (re-release)	May 18, 1998	CD; cassette	Columbia	
