= Steady On (Shawn Colvin album) =

Studio album by Shawn Colvin
- Released: October 17, 1989
- Studio: Shelter Island (Shelter Island, New York)
- Genre: Folk
- Length: 44:09
- Label: Columbia
- Producers: John Leventhal; Steve Addabbo; Bob Riley

Shawn Colvin chronology
Steady On (1989)	Fat City (1992)

Steady On is the debut studio album by American singer-songwriter Shawn Colvin, released on October 17, 1989, by Columbia Records. In addition to launching Colvin's career the album was positively received by critics and had moderate commercial success.

== Recording and release ==
The album was recorded in Steve Addabbo's Shelter Island Sound recording studio in Shelter Island, New York. Colvin has explained that the themes on the album include healing from personal life trauma and drug and alcohol addiction.

Colvin recorded acoustic versions of these songs for 2019's Steady On: 30th Anniversary Acoustic Edition.

== Reception ==
Professional ratings
Review scores
Source	Rating
AllMusic	4/5 stars
Q	3/5 stars
The Rolling Stone Album Guide	3.5/5 stars

Steady On won the award for Best Contemporary Folk Album at the 33rd Grammy Awards in February 1991. AllMusic calls the album "a must have for anyone who loves acoustic music created in the grand tradition of Joni Mitchell and James Taylor." Notable guest appearances include Suzanne Vega and Bruce Hornsby.

The album reached 111 on the Billboard 200 in 1989. The title track was released as a single and in 1990 reached 30 on the Billboard Adult Contemporary chart and 23 on the Modern Rock Tracks chart.

== Track listing ==
No.	Title	Writer(s)	Length
1.	"Steady On"	Colvin; John Leventhal	4:59
2.	"Diamond in the Rough"	Colvin; Leventhal	5:02
3.	"Shotgun Down the Avalanche"	Colvin; Leventhal	5:02
4.	"Stranded"	Colvin	4:03
5.	"Another Long One"	Colvin	3:46
6.	"Cry Like an Angel"	Colvin; Leventhal	4:52
7.	"Something to Believe In"	Colvin; Leventhal	4:12
8.	"The Story"	Colvin; Leventhal	3:59
9.	"Ricochet in Time"	Colvin	3:11
10.	"The Dead of the Night"	Colvin	5:03

Arrangement ideas were contributed by T-Bone Wolk and Phil Galdston on "Diamond in the Rough" and David Sanborn on "Another Long One".

== Personnel ==
Musicians

- Steve Addabbo – tambourine
- Michael Blair – drums, percussion
- Shawn Colvin – lead vocals, guitar, keyboards, background vocals
- Charles Curtis – cello
- Steve Gaboury – keyboards, drum programming
- Bruce Hornsby – piano
- Lucy Kaplansky – background vocals
- John Leventhal – guitar, bass, mandolin, keyboards, tambourine, background vocals, drum programming
- Hugh McCracken – guitar, dobro, high-strung guitar
- Dennis McDermott – drums
- Rick Marotta – drums
- Bob Riley – guitar, keyboards, drum programming
- Bob Telson – organ
- Soozie Tyrell – fiddle, background vocals
- Suzanne Vega – background vocals on "Diamond in the Rough"
- T-Bone Wolk – guitar, bass, accordion

Production

- Steve Addabbo – co-producer, engineer
- Paul Angelli – assistant engineer
- Kris Brauninger – assistant engineer
- Carol Chen – art direction
- Ronald K. Fierstein – executive producer
- Phil Galdston – assistant arranger
- Kevin Halpin – engineer
- Geoff Keehn – engineer
- Kevin Killen – mixing
- Phil Klum – assistant engineer
- John Leventhal – co-producer
- Bob Ludwig – mastering
- Marcus Miller – assistant engineer
- UE Nastasi – assistant engineer
- Frank Ockenfels – photography
- Mark Partis – engineer
- Malcolm Pollack – engineer
- David Sanborn – assistant arranger, arrangement collaboration
- Ted Spencer – engineer
- Dary Sulich – assistant engineer

== Charts ==
Chart performance for Steady On
Chart (1989/1990)	Peak position
Australian Albums (ARIA)	102
United States (Billboard 200)	111

== Release history ==
date	format	label	catalog #
	CD	Columbia	CK-45209
		Columbia	FC 45209
	CD	Columbia	CO45209
1989	CS	Columbia	FCT-45209
1995	CD	Columbia	45209
2001	CD	Sony	4661422
2008	CD	Sbme Special MKTS.	725020
