= I Feel Lucky =

Single by Mary Chapin Carpenter

from the album Come On Come On
- B-side: "Middle Ground"
- Released: May 18, 1992
- Genre: Country
- Length: 3:31
- Label: Columbia
- Songwriters: Mary Chapin Carpenter, Don Schlitz
- Producers: Mary Chapin Carpenter, John Jennings

Mary Chapin Carpenter singles chronology
| "Going Out Tonight" (1991) | "I Feel Lucky" (1992) | "Not Too Much to Ask" (1992) |

"I Feel Lucky" is a song co-written and recorded by American country music artist Mary Chapin Carpenter. It was released in May 1992 as the first single from the album Come On Come On. The song reached number 4 on the Billboard Hot Country Singles & Tracks chart. The Chipettes recorded a cover of this song for the 1992 album Chipmunks in Low Places. It was written by Carpenter and Don Schlitz.

== Content ==
The song tells the story of a woman who repeatedly receives bad omens for the upcoming day: her horoscope warns that "the stars are stacked against" her and to stay in bed, but she disregards it, heads for the convenience store, buys a lottery ticket, cigarettes, a burrito and a root beer, and heads for the park, where a thunderstorm and a voice from the skies warns her to head home. She disregards the voice just as she did with the horoscope saying "I feel lucky."

The lottery ticket turns out to be an $11 million winner, and she heads to the bar to celebrate, where she meets Lyle Lovett and Dwight Yoakam, who both make passes at her. The moral of the story: "the stars might lie, but the numbers never do."

== Personnel ==
Credits are adapted from the liner notes of Come On Come On.

- J. T. Brown – bass guitar, background vocals
- Mary Chapin Carpenter – vocals
- Jon Carroll – piano, backing vocals
- John Jennings – acoustic and electric guitars, backing vocals
- Robbie Magruder – drums
- Mike McAdam – electric guitar

== Music video ==
The music video was directed by Jack Cole and premiered in mid-1992. It was filmed in the Mojave Desert in California. It begins with a middle-aged couple sitting outside their old RV trailer, each reading a magazine. They notice a shiny Airstream moving toward them, with Mary and her friends as passengers. Mary notices the unpleasant and dry feel of the landscape, and instantly throws an outdoor party complete with catered food, music and dancing. The couple seem surprised and reluctant to all this, and don't pay much attention, but eventually get up and join in. Posters of Dwight Yoakam and Lyle Lovett appear during the verse that mentions them. When the song is near over, a storm cloud appears and Mary Chapin suggests they take the party into the trailer. They do, but only after the male in the couple receives a kiss on the cheek from one of the passengers. Once the trailer leaves, the couple go back to their chairs, as the woman in the couple says to the man regarding the party, "If you ever mention this to anybody, I'll divorce you," before putting their heads back in their magazines.

The majority of the video is in color, but the beginning and ending scenes are in greyscale to give it a deserted and dusty look.

== Chart performance ==
"I Feel Lucky" debuted at number 58 on the U.S. Billboard Hot Country Singles & Tracks for the week of May 30, 1992.

| Chart (1992) | Peak position |
|---|---|
| Canada Adult Contemporary (RPM) | 16 |
| Canada Country Singles (RPM) | 3 |
| US Hot Country Songs (Billboard) | 4 |

=== Year-end charts ===
| Chart (1992) | Position |
|---|---|
| Canada Country Tracks (RPM) | 36 |
| US Country Songs (Billboard) | 15 |
