= Passionate Kisses =

1989 single by Lucinda Williams

Single by Lucinda Williams

from the album Lucinda Williams
- B-side: "Side of the Road"
- Released: 1989
- Recorded: June 1988
- Studio: Mad Dog (Venice, Los Angeles)
- Genre: Blues; folk; world; country
- Length: 2:35
- Label: Rough Trade
- Songwriter: Lucinda Williams
- Producers: Lucinda Williams; Dusty Wakeman; Gurf Morlix

Lucinda Williams singles chronology
"I Just Wanted to See You So Bad" (1989)	"Passionate Kisses" (1989)	"Six Blocks Away" (1992)

"Passionate Kisses" is a song written and performed by American singer-songwriter Lucinda Williams. It was released in 1989 as the fourth single from her self-titled third album (1988).

The song was covered by Mary Chapin Carpenter for her 1992 album Come On Come On, and released as the album's third single.

== Critical reception ==
Hailed as the definitive version, Williams' original take has received widespread critical acclaim. Robin Denselow, writing in The Guardian, called the song a "rousing country rocker." Country music website The Boot ranked "Passionate Kisses" No. 1 on their list of the best Lucinda Williams songs, describing it as "a modern-day feminist anthem about having it all — a comfortable bed, food, a rock band and passionate kisses."

In 2021, "Passionate Kisses" ranked No. 437 on Rolling Stone's 500 Greatest Songs of All Time. The same outlet ranked the song at No. 100 on its list of the 200 Greatest Country Songs of All Time in 2024.

== Music video ==
Williams filmed and released a music video for the track in August 1989. It would be the last time Williams starred in one of her own music videos until "Rock n Roll Heart" in 2023.

== Track listing ==
CD single

- "Passionate Kisses" – 2:35
- "Nothing In Rambling" – 4:45
- "Disgusted" – 3:09
- "Goin' Back Home" – 3:22
- "Side Of The Road" – 3:27

== Charts ==
Chart (1989)	Peak position
Australia (ARIA)	169

== Mary Chapin Carpenter version ==
"Passionate Kisses"

Single by Mary Chapin Carpenter

from the album Come On Come On
- B-side: "Middle Ground"
- Released: January 19, 1993
- Recorded: 1992
- Studio: Bias (Springfield, Virginia)
- Genre: Country
- Length: 3:23
- Label: Columbia
- Songwriter: Lucinda Williams
- Producers: Mary Chapin Carpenter; John Jennings

Mary Chapin Carpenter singles chronology
"Not Too Much to Ask" (1992)	"Passionate Kisses" (1993)	"The Hard Way" (1993)

Released in January 1993 by Columbia Records, "Passionate Kisses" was the third single from American country and folk music singer-songwriter Mary Chapin Carpenter's fourth album, Come On Come On (1992). The song reached No. 4 on the US Billboard Hot Country Singles & Tracks chart in March 1993. It also peaked at No. 53 and 57 on the Cash Box Top 100 and Billboard Hot 100 charts. Carpenter's version adheres closely in tempo, feel, and instrumentation to Williams' original recording, similarly relying on the catchy guitar riff to anchor the record.

The recording enhanced Carpenter's crossover appeal and earned her the Grammy Award for Best Female Country Vocal Performance in 1994, in addition to securing the Grammy Award for Best Country Song for Williams. Carpenter filmed a music video for the track in Washington, D.C. and it premiered in early 1993.

=== Awards ===
Year	Award	Category	Work	Recipient	Result	Ref.
1994	Grammy Award	Best Female Country Vocal Performance	"Passionate Kisses"	Mary Chapin Carpenter	Won	
1994	Grammy Award	Best Country Song	"Passionate Kisses"	Lucinda Williams (songwriter)	Won	

=== Track listing ===
CD single

- "Passionate Kisses" – 3:23
- "Downtown Train" – 4:11
- "The Bug" – 3:48
- "Quittin' Time" – 3:52

=== Charts ===
Chart (1993)	Peak position
Canada Top Singles (RPM)	39
Canada Adult Contemporary (RPM)	17
Canada Country Singles (RPM)	5
US Billboard Hot 100	57
US Adult Contemporary (Billboard)	11
US Hot Country Songs (Billboard)	4
US Cash Box Top 100	53

=== Year-end charts ===
Chart (1993)	Position
Canada Country Tracks (RPM)	69
US Country Songs (Billboard)	67
