= The Hard Way (Mary Chapin Carpenter song) =

Single by Mary Chapin Carpenter

from the album Come On Come On
- B-side: "Goodbye Again"
- Released: March 1993
- Genre: Country
- Length: 4:23
- Label: Columbia
- Songwriter: Mary Chapin Carpenter
- Producers: Mary Chapin Carpenter; John Jennings

Mary Chapin Carpenter singles chronology
"Passionate Kisses" (1993)	"The Hard Way" (1993)	"The Bug" (1993)

"The Hard Way" is a song written and recorded by American country music artist Mary Chapin Carpenter. It was released in March 1993 as the fourth single from her album Come On Come On. The song reached number 11 on the Billboard Hot Country Singles & Tracks chart in July 1993. It was nominated at the 36th Grammy Awards for Best Country Song.

== Background ==
The song became the de facto theme song of the 1993 CBS television special Women of Country, which closed with a performance of the song featuring Carpenter and the rest of the special's all-star cast of female country entertainers.

== Personnel ==
- Mary Chapin Carpenter–acoustic guitar, vocals
- Jon Caroll–synthesizer
- Denny Dadmun-Bixby–bass guitar
- John Jennings–electric guitar and background vocals
- Matt Rollings–piano
- Robbie Magruder–drums
- Indigo Girls (Amy Ray and Emily Saliers) and Shawn Colvin–background vocals

== Chart performance ==
Chart (1993)	Peak position
Canada Country Singles (RPM)	11
US Hot Country Songs (Billboard)	11
