= These Four Walls (Shawn Colvin album) =

Studio album by Shawn Colvin
- Released: September 12, 2006
- Genre: Folk; soft rock
- Length: 44:42
- Label: Nonesuch
- Producer: John Leventhal

Shawn Colvin chronology
Whole New You (2001)	These Four Walls (2006)	All Fall Down (2012)

Professional ratings
Review scores
Source	Rating
Allmusic	3.5/5 stars
Music Box	3/5 stars

These Four Walls is the seventh studio album by American singer-songwriter Shawn Colvin. It was released on September 12, 2006 by Nonesuch Records.

== Track listing ==
All tracks are written by Shawn Colvin and John Leventhal except where indicated.

No.	Title	Writer(s)	Length
1.	"Fill Me Up"		3:40
2.	"These Four Walls"		2:57
3.	"Tuff Kid"		3:08
4.	"Summer Dress"		4:21
5.	"Cinnamon Road"		3:51
6.	"Venetian Blue"		3:48
7.	"The Bird"		3:10
8.	"I'm Gone"	Colvin	2:53
9.	"Let It Slide"		4:17
10.	"Even Here We Are"	Paul Westerberg	2:45
11.	"So Good to See You"		3:43
12.	"That Don't Worry Me Now"		3:41
13.	"Words"	Barry Gibb; Maurice Gibb; Robin Gibb	2:32

Barnes & Noble bonus track
No.	Title	Writer(s)	Length
14.	"Pride (In the Name of Love)"	Bono; U2	4:18

== Personnel ==
- Shawn Colvin – vocals, guitar
- John Leventhal – bass, dobro, guitar, mandolin, percussion, pedal steel guitar, keyboards
- Shawn Pelton – drums, percussion
- Greg Leisz – pedal steel guitar
- RIck DePofi – organ, percussion, horn
- Antoine Silverman – fiddle
- Marc Cohn – vocals
- Patty Griffin – vocals
- Teddy Thompson – vocals

Production notes:

- Shawn Colvin – producer
- John Leventhal – producer, engineer, mixing
- Fred Remmert – engineer
- Rick DePofi – engineer
- Matt Shane – studio assistant
- Dan Mufson – studio assistant
- Bob Ludwig – mastering
- Maggie Taylor – artwork
- Karina Benznicki – project supervisor
- RoLisa Arzt – project coordinator
- Eli Cane – project coordinator
- Jill Dell'Abate – project coordinator
- Traci Goudie – photography

== Charts ==
Chart (2006)	Peak position
US Billboard 200	109
