= Down at the Twist and Shout =

1991 hit single by Mary Chapin Carpenter

Single by Mary Chapin Carpenter

from the album Shooting Straight in the Dark
- B-side: "Halley Came to Jackson"
- Released: June 3, 1991
- Genre: Country; country rock; rock and roll; Cajun
- Length: 3:21
- Label: Columbia
- Songwriter: Mary Chapin Carpenter
- Producers: Mary Chapin Carpenter; John Jennings

Mary Chapin Carpenter singles chronology
"Right Now" (1991)	"Down at the Twist and Shout" (1991)	"Going Out Tonight" (1991)

"Down at the Twist and Shout" is a song written and recorded by American country music artist Mary Chapin Carpenter. It celebrates the Bethesda, Maryland, dance and music venue Twist & Shout. It was released in June 1991 as the third single from the album Shooting Straight in the Dark. The song reached number 2 on the Billboard Hot Country Singles & Tracks chart on September 14, 1991. The Cajun-themed song features backing from members of BeauSoleil, who are also name-dropped in the lyrics. Carpenter (and BeauSoleil) performed the song pregame at Super Bowl XXXI.

In 1992, "Down at the Twist and Shout" won Carpenter a Grammy for Best Country Vocal Performance, Female. It was also nominated at the Academy of Country Music Awards for Song of the Year, losing to Billy Dean's "Somewhere in My Broken Heart".

Alvin and the Chipmunks recorded a cover for their 1992 album Chipmunks in Low Places.

American Aquarium covered the song on their 2021 album Slappers, Bangers, and Certified Twangers: Vol 1.

== Music video ==
The music video was directed by Jack Cole and premiered in mid-1991.

== Personnel ==
Per liner notes from Shooting Straight in the Dark.

- Peter Bonta – acoustic guitar
- Jimmy Breaux – accordion, Cajun yells
- Mary Chapin Carpenter – lead and backing vocals, acoustic guitar
- Michael Doucet – fiddle, Cajun yells
- John Jennings – electric guitar, backing vocals, Cajun yells
- Robbie Magruder – drums
- Rico Petruccelli – bass guitar
- Billy Ware – percussion, Cajun yells

== Chart performance ==
Chart (1991)	Peak position
Canada Country Singles (RPM)	7
US Hot Country Songs (Billboard)	2

=== Year-end charts ===
Chart (1991)	Position
Canada Country Tracks (RPM)	82
US Country Songs (Billboard)	47
