= Shawn Colvin =

American singer-songwriter (born 1956)

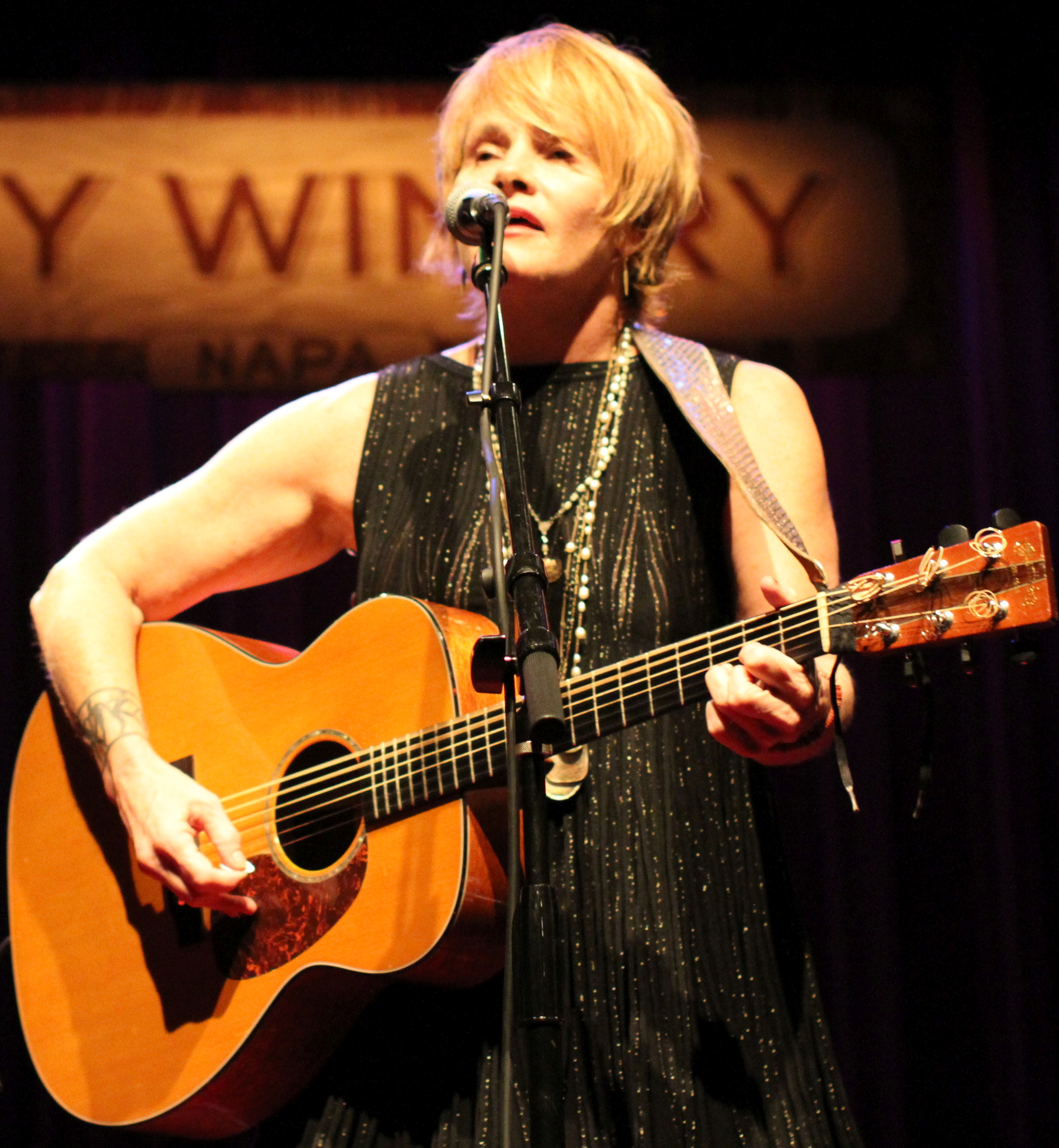
- Colvin performing in 2015

Background information
- Born: Shawna Lee Colvin; January 10, 1956 (age 70); Vermillion, South Dakota, U.S.
- Origin: Carbondale, Illinois, U.S.
- Genres: Contemporary folk; Americana; country folk
- Occupations: Singer; musician; songwriter
- Instruments: Vocals; guitar
- Years active: 1973–present
- Labels: Columbia; Nonesuch; Fantasy
- Website: shawncolvinmusic.com

Shawna Lee "Shawn" Colvin (born January 10, 1956) is an American singer and songwriter. She began her career performing in several folk and rock bands throughout the 1970s and 1980s before touring with Suzanne Vega in 1988, which landed her a recording contract with Columbia Records. Her debut studio album Steady On (1989) received the Grammy Award for Best Contemporary Folk Album. Her subsequent albums Fat City (1992) and Cover Girl (1994) yielded her two additional Grammy nominations before Colvin's fourth studio album A Few Small Repairs (1996) saw the large success of the single "Sunny Came Home", which received the Grammy Award for Song of the Year and Record of the Year. Colvin's career also gained a following in the 1990s after she performed during all three original iterations of the Lilith Fair music festival.

Following the release of her fifth studio album Whole New You (2001), Colvin signed with Nonesuch Records for her next two studio albums These Four Walls (2006) and All Fall Down (2012), both of which saw continued success. Her most recent studio releases include Uncovered (2015) and The Starlighter (2018). William Morrow published Colvin's memoir Diamond in the Rough in 2012 to a positive reception.

== Early life ==
Colvin was born Shawna Lee Colvin in Vermillion, South Dakota, and spent her youth in Carbondale, Illinois, and London, Ontario, Canada. She is the second of four children. She learned to play guitar at the age of 10 and grew up listening to her father's collection of music, which included artists such as Pete Seeger and the Kingston Trio.

== Career ==
Her first paid gig came just after she started college at Southern Illinois University. Colvin performed at local venues in Carbondale and later formed a band. For six months, they expanded their fanbase throughout Illinois. During this time, Colvin struggled with alcohol and other drugs. She later formed Dixie Diesels, a country-swing group. Colvin relocated to Austin, Texas, with the group and then entered "the folk circuit in and around Berkeley, California", before straining her vocal cords and taking a sabbatical at the age of 24.

Colvin relocated to New York City, joining the Buddy Miller Band in 1980 and later became involved in the Fast Folk cooperative of Greenwich Village.

While participating in off-Broadway shows such as Pump Boys and Dinettes, she was featured in Fast Folk magazine, and in 1987, producer Steve Addabbo hired her to sing backup vocals on the song "Luka" by Suzanne Vega.

After touring with Vega, Colvin signed a recording contract with Columbia Records and released her debut album Steady On in 1989. The album won a Grammy Award for Best Contemporary Folk Album. Colvin's second album Fat City was released in 1992 and received a Grammy nomination for Best Contemporary Folk Recording. Her song "I Don't Know Why" was nominated for a Grammy in the Best Female Pop Vocal category. In 1993, she moved back to Austin and, in 1994, released the album Cover Girl. In 1995, Colvin released her album Live 88 a collection of live recordings from 1988.

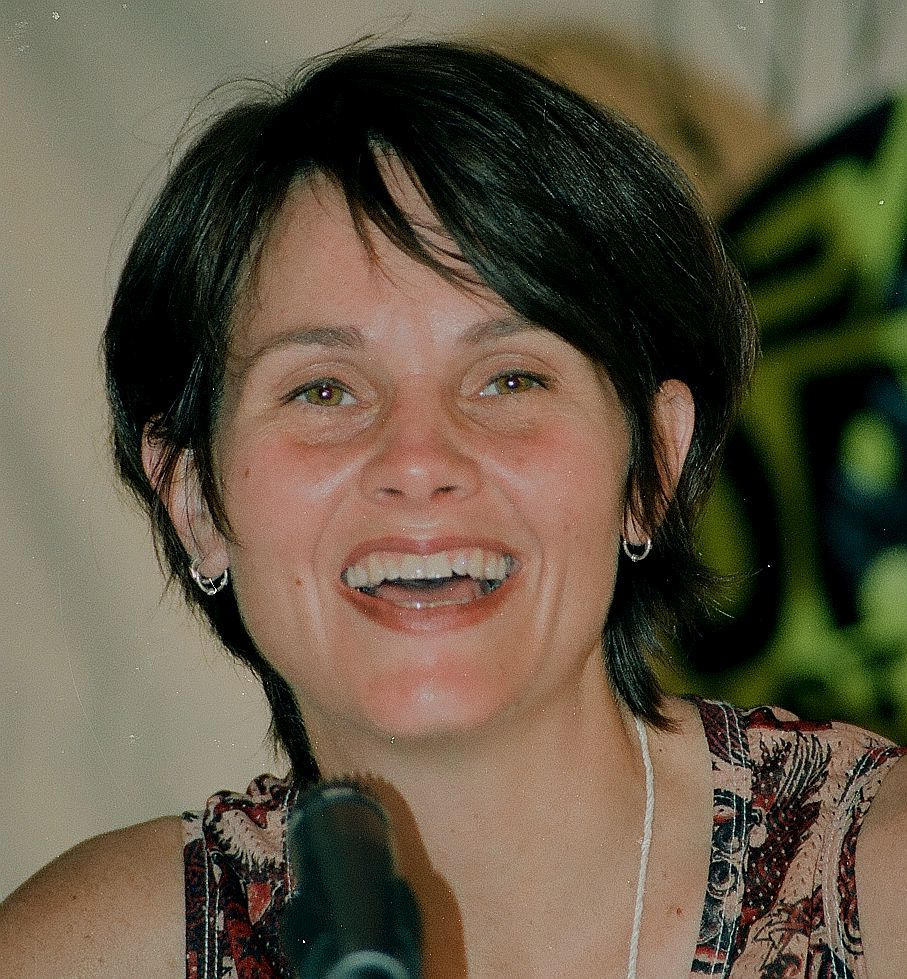
Colvin in 1995

Colvin recorded with Bruce Hornsby on his 1990 A Night on the Town album. She dueted with Hornsby on the song "Lost Soul", which peaked at No. 84 on the US Billboard Hot 100.

In 1996, Colvin released her album A Few Small Repairs and, in 1997, her single "Sunny Came Home" spent four weeks at the number one spot on the Adult Contemporary chart. The song won the 1998 Grammy Awards for both Song and Record of the Year. Colvin released the album Holiday Songs and Lullabies in 1998 and in 2001 released another album called Whole New You. In 2004, she released a compilation of past songs called, Polaroids: A Greatest Hits Collection.

In 2006, Colvin left Columbia Records and released a 15-song album called These Four Walls on her new label, Nonesuch Records, which featured contributions by Patty Griffin and Teddy Thompson. In 2009 she released Live, which was recorded at the jazz club Yoshi's in Oakland, California.

Colvin's eighth studio album, All Fall Down, was released in 2012 and was produced by Buddy Miller at his home studio in Nashville, Tennessee. The album featured guest appearances by Emmylou Harris, Alison Krauss and Jakob Dylan. Colvin published her memoir Diamond in the Rough in 2012. In 2016, she recorded an album with Steve Earle called Colvin and Earle. A Few Small Repairs was reissued in 2017, including its first pressing on vinyl, for its 20th anniversary.

Colvin has made vocal contributions to songs by James Taylor, Béla Fleck, Edwin McCain, Shawn Mullins, and Elliott Murphy and collaborated with Sting on the song "One Day She'll Love Me". She recorded as a duet the title track to Curtis Stigers' 1995 album "Time Was". Colvin voiced Rachel Jordan, Ned Flanders' love interest after Maude is killed, in the Simpsons episodes "Alone Again, Natura-Diddily" and "I'm Goin' to Praiseland", and lent her vocals to Mary Chapin Carpenter's 1992 recordings "The Hard Way" and "Come On Come On".

=== Acting ===
Colvin has appeared in several films and television shows, including the films Grace of My Heart, Heartbreakers and Crazy as well as television shows The Larry Sanders Show, Suddenly Susan, The Simpsons, Fame L.A., The L Word and Baywatch.

== Personal life ==
Colvin has been married twice, first to Simon Tassano in 1993 whom she divorced in 1995 and to photographer Mario Erwin, whom she married in 1997 and divorced in 2002. She gave birth to a daughter in July 1998.

Colvin has taken part in several triathlons.

Colvin says she has struggled on and off with depression, alcoholism and anxiety. She wrote about these struggles in her 2012 memoir Diamond in the Rough, published by HarperCollins.

== Awards and recognition ==
=== Grammy Awards ===
Year	Album/Track	Category	Result
1991	Steady On	Best Contemporary Folk Album	Won
1994	"I Don't Know Why"	Best Female Pop Vocal Performance	Nominated
1994	Fat City	Best Contemporary Folk Album	Nominated
1995	Cover Girl	Best Contemporary Folk Album	Nominated
1997	A Few Small Repairs	Best Pop Vocal Album	Nominated
1997	"Get Out of This House"	Best Female Pop Vocal Performance	Nominated
1998	"Sunny Came Home"	Best Female Pop Vocal Performance	Nominated
1998	"Sunny Came Home"	Record of the Year	Won
1998	"Sunny Came Home"	Song of the Year	Won
2009	Shawn Colvin Live	Best Contemporary Folk Album	Nominated

=== Other awards ===
Year	Awards	Category	Work	Result
1997	Billboard Music Video Awards	FAN.tastic Video	"Sunny Came Home"	Nominated
1997	Billboard Music Awards	Top Adult Top 40 Track	"Sunny Came Home"	Nominated
1998	APRA Music Awards	Most Performed Foreign Work	"Sunny Came Home"	Nominated
1998	MVPA Awards	Best Adult Contemporary Video	"Sunny Came Home"	Won
1999	ASCAP Pop Music Awards	Most Performed Song	"Sunny Came Home"	Won
2001	Video Premiere Awards	Best Original Song	"Great Big World"	Nominated
2016	Americana Music Honors & Awards	Americana Trailblazer Award	Herself	Won

== Discography ==
=== Albums ===
- Steady On (1989)
- Fat City (1992)
- Cover Girl (1994)
- A Few Small Repairs (1996)
- Holiday Songs and Lullabies (1998)
- Whole New You (2001)
- These Four Walls (2006)
- All Fall Down (2012)
- Uncovered (2015)
- Colvin & Earle (2016, with Steve Earle)
- The Starlighter (2018)
- Steady On: 30th Anniversary Acoustic Edition (2019)

=== Compilation albums ===
- Polaroids: A Greatest Hits Collection (2004)
- The Best of Shawn Colvin (2010)
- Playlist: The Very Best of Shawn Colvin (2012)

=== Live albums ===
- Live '88 (1995)
- Live (2009)
- Live from These Four Walls: My Favorite Movie Songs (2021)
- Lockdown: Live from Arlyn Studios (2021)

=== DVDs ===
- Music in High Places – Live in Bora Bora (2002)
- Polaroids: A Video Collection (2004)
