= A Few Small Repairs =

Studio album by Shawn Colvin
- Released: October 1, 1996
- Genre: Rock; pop; folk
- Length: 51:09
- Label: Columbia
- Producer: John Leventhal; Malcolm Burn ("What I Get Paid For")

Shawn Colvin chronology
Cover Girl (1994)	A Few Small Repairs (1996)	Holiday Songs and Lullabies (1998)

Singles from A Few Small Repairs
- 1. "Get Out of This House" Released: 1996; 2. "Sunny Came Home" Released: February 4, 1997; 3. "You and the Mona Lisa" Released: September 23, 1997; 4. "Nothin' on Me" Released: 1998

A Few Small Repairs is the fourth studio album by American singer-songwriter Shawn Colvin. It was released on October 1, 1996, by Columbia Records. On September 15, 2017, Columbia/Legacy Recordings released a 20th anniversary edition of the album on CD, vinyl and digital formats. In addition to the original album being newly remastered, seven previously unreleased live tracks were included.

== Background ==
A Few Small Repairs is a concept album about divorce, as Colvin's marriage was ending. At the time of the album's release, she had relocated to Austin, Texas. The album cover consists of a painting by Colvin's friend Julie Speed of a three-eyed woman with a lit match, which inspired Colvin to write the song "Sunny Came Home". Colvin found the painting so arresting that she knew she wanted to use it as the cover before the songwriting and recording were done.

== Singles ==
A Few Small Repairs was supported by four singles. The album's biggest single, released in 1997, was "Sunny Came Home", which peaked on the Billboard Hot 100 at number 7, and topped the Adult Contemporary, Adult Top 40, and Top 40 Adult Recurrents charts the same year.

Another notable song from the album was "Nothin' on Me", which peaked at number 24 on Billboard's Adult Top 40 chart. The song was also used on Suddenly Susan as its theme song from 1997 to 2000. Colvin appeared on the show in the second-season episode Ready ... aim ... Fong!. She performed the song on the show.

== Reception ==
=== Critical reception ===
Professional ratings
Review scores
Source	Rating
AllMusic	4.5/5 stars
Chicago Sun-Times	3.5/4 stars
E! Online	A−
Entertainment Weekly	A
The Guardian	3/5 stars
Los Angeles Times	2.5/4 stars
Paste	8.7/10
PopMatters	9/10
Q	4/5 stars
Wall of Sound	80/100

Calling A Few Small Repairs "Colvin's finest effort to date", AllMusic critic Chris Woodstra said that while the album "is certainly a response" to Colvin's divorce, "she avoids the obvious clichés in dealing with the aftermath, revealing instead the complex thought processes and complete range of human emotion, from anger, sadness, confusion, yearning, and disillusionment to resolve and recovery." Dave Henderson of Q wrote that it "confirms her position as a major vocalist with emotive phrasing and poignant lyrics", as well as "personal parables that are at once chilling and insightful".

=== Commercial performance ===
A Few Small Repairs peaked at number 39 on the Billboard 200 chart.

=== Awards ===
Grammy success came to Colvin two years after the release of A Few Small Repairs. At the 1997 Grammy Awards, she was nominated for Best Female Pop Vocal Performance award for "Get Out of This House" and Best Pop Album for A Few Small Repairs. At the next year's Grammy Awards, Colvin was nominated for Song of the Year and Record of the Year for "Sunny Came Home". She won both awards (sharing Song of the Year with Leventhal). As Colvin was about to begin her speech after winning Song of the Year, rapper Ol' Dirty Bastard stormed the stage protesting his loss of an award that same night, saying, "...I don't know how you all see it, but when it comes to the children, Wu-Tang is for the children..." leading him to be escorted off stage. Colvin then began her speech, remarking, "I'm confused now!"

== Track listing ==
All tracks are written by Shawn Colvin and John Leventhal, except where noted

A Few Small Repairs track listing
No.	Title	Writer(s)	Length
1.	"Sunny Came Home"		4:24
2.	"Get Out of This House"		4:15
3.	"The Facts About Jimmy"		5:22
4.	"You and the Mona Lisa"		4:05
5.	"Trouble"	Colvin; Leventhal; Tom Littlefield	4:18
6.	"I Want It Back"		4:55
7.	"If I Were Brave"	Colvin	3:11
8.	"Wichita Skyline"		3:39
9.	"84,000 Different Delusions"		4:01
10.	"Suicide Alley"		5:29
11.	"What I Get Paid For"	Colvin; Neil Finn	3:23
12.	"New Thing Now"	Colvin	3:34
13.	"Nothin' on Me"		3:56

=== Notes ===
- "What I Get Paid For" does not appear on North American pressings of the album, therefore reducing the number of tracks to 12.

== Personnel ==
Credits adapted from the liner notes of A Few Small Repairs.

Musicians

- Shawn Colvin – All vocals (2, 5–8, 12), lead vocals (1, 3–4, 9–10, 13), background vocals (4), acoustic guitar (tracks 1, 5, 8–10, 12–13), additional guitars (6), piano (7), handclaps (2)
- Chris Botti – trumpet (4)
- Bob Carlisle – French horn (3)
- Rick Depofi – tenor saxophone (4), clarinet (7), bass clarinet (3), piccolo flute (9), recorder instrument (9)
- Larry Farrell – trombone (3–4)
- Danny Ferrington – background vocals (4)
- Tony Kadlek – flugelhorn (3)
- John Leventhal – All guitars (2), electric guitar (12), additional guitars (1, 3–6, 8–10, 12–13), pedal steel guitar (6), mandolin (1), keyboards (1–5, 8–10, 12–13), organ played by (6), violin (1), additional percussion (1, 3–6, 8–10, 13), harmonica (2, 4), background vocals (4, 9, 13)
- Lyle Lovett – harmony vocals (3)
- Kate Markowitz – harmony vocals (1, 4), background vocals (4)
- Eugene Moye – cello (2, 7–8)
- Judith Owen – harmony vocals (10)
- Mark Plati – bass played by (4)
- Sandra Park – violin (2, 7–8)
- Shawn Pelton – drums (1–6, 8–10, 13), percussion (2, 4–5)
- Michael Rhodes – bass guitar (1, 3, 6, 9–10)
- Robert Rinehart – viola (2, 7–8)
- Carol Webb – violin (2, 7–8)

Production

- Scott Ansell – additional recording engineer
- Joe Blaney – recording engineer
- Malcolm Burn – record producer (11)
- Bob Clearmountain – audio mixing
- Paul Dieter – additional recording engineer
- Bill Emmons – assistant recording engineer
- Ryan Freeland – mixing assistant
- Troy Gonzalez – assistant recording engineer
- Aaron Keane – assistant recording engineer
- Peter Keppler – additional recording engineer, assistant recording engineer
- Fred Kevorkian – additional recording engineer
- John Leventhal – record producer (1–10, 12–13), recording engineer
- Mark Plati – recording engineer
- Fred Remmert – additional recording engineer
- Tom Schick – assistant recording engineer

== Charts ==
Chart performance for A Few Small Repairs
Chart (1996–1997)	Peak position
Australian Albums (ARIA)	48
New Zealand Albums (RMNZ)	24
UK Albums (OCC)	100
US Billboard 200	39

== Certifications ==
Certifications for A Few Small Repairs
Region	Certification	Certified units/sales
United States (RIAA)	Platinum	1,000,000^{^}
^{^} Shipments figures based on certification alone.
