= Cover Girl (Shawn Colvin album) =

Studio album by Shawn Colvin
- Released: August 23, 1994
- Recorded: 1993–94
- Venue: The Bitter End
- Studio: Sony Music
- Label: Columbia
- Producer: Shawn Colvin, David Kahne, Steuart Smith

Shawn Colvin chronology
Fat City (1992)	Cover Girl (1994)	A Few Small Repairs (1996)

Cover Girl is the third studio album by American singer-songwriter Shawn Colvin, released in 1994 on Columbia Records. Colvin is a singer-songwriter who usually records her own material, however, as the title alludes to, all of the tracks on the album are covers of previously recorded songs.

== Reception ==
Professional ratings
Review scores
Source	Rating
AllMusic	3/5 stars
Chicago Tribune	3/4 stars
Entertainment Weekly	C+
Los Angeles Times	3/4 stars
Music Week	3/5 stars
NME	3/10
Q	4/5 stars
Rolling Stone	2/5 stars
Vox	8/10

Cover Girl received a Grammy Award nomination for Best Contemporary Folk Album.

== Track listing ==
Track No	Song title	Songwriter/composer(s)	Length
1	"Every Little Thing (He) Does Is Magic"	Sting	3:17
2	"(Looking for) The Heart of Saturday Night" [live]	Tom Waits	3:36
3	"One Cool Remove" (feat. Mary Chapin Carpenter)	Greg Brown	3:19
4	"Satin Sheets" [live]	Willis Alan Ramsey	3:10
5	"There's a Rugged Road"	Judee Sill	3:43
6	"Killing the Blues" [live]	Roly Salley	3:47
7	"Window to the World"	Tom Littlefield	5:15
8	"Someday"	Steve Earle	4:09
9	"Twilight" [live]	Robbie Robertson	2:56
10	"If These Walls Could Speak"	Jimmy Webb	3:06
11	"This Must Be the Place (Naive Melody)"	David Byrne, Chris Frantz, Jerry Harrison, Tina Weymouth.	4:01
12	"You're Gonna Make Me Lonesome When You Go" [live]	Bob Dylan	4:10
13 (hidden)	"Ol' 55" [live]	Tom Waits	

== Personnel ==
- Shawn Colvin – guitar, vocals
- Jim Keltner – drums
- Steve Addabbo – guitar
- Kenny Aronoff – drums, percussion
- Benmont Tench – Hammond organ
- Larry Campbell – fiddle, pedal steel
- Mary Chapin Carpenter – vocals
- Milt Grayson – background vocals
- David Kahne – bass, keyboards
- Curtis King – background vocals
- Larry Klein – bass
- Andy Kravitz – drums
- Steuart Smith – guitar, bass, mandolin, keyboards
- Fonzi Thornton – background vocals
- Frank Vilardi – drums, percussion
- Ken White – background vocals
- Leland Sklar – bass
- Frank Floyd – background vocals
- Tom "T-Bone" Wolk – bass, accordion
