= Gillian Welch discography =

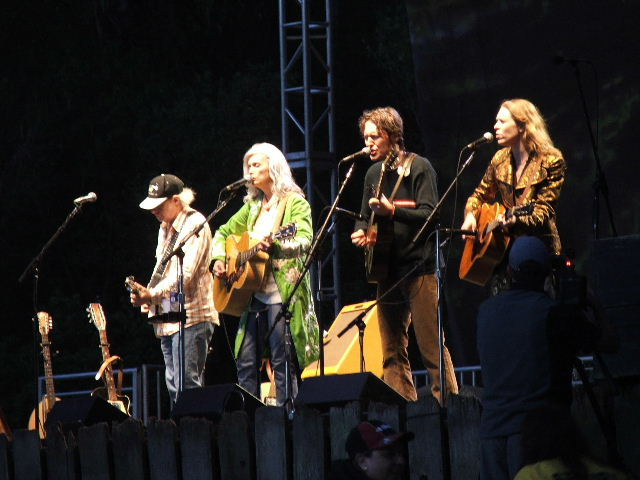
- Buddy Miller, Emmylou Harris, David Rawlings & Gillian Welch performing at Hardly Strictly Bluegrass
- Studio albums: 6
- Soundtrack albums: 4
- Tribute albums: 5
- Music videos: 4
- Archival releases: 4
- Other appearances: 29

Gillian Welch (born October 2, 1967) is a singer-songwriter from Nashville, Tennessee. Welch plays with her music partner David Rawlings, whom she met while they were both students at The Berklee College of Music. The first two Gillian Welch albums were released through the label Almo Sounds. After Universal Music Group purchased Almo, Welch started her own label, Acony Records.

In her career, Welch has collaborated with several artists, appearing as a musician, songwriter, and vocalist.

The artist in all recordings is listed as "Gillian Welch" except where noted.

== Studio albums ==
Title	Album details	Peak chart positions								
Title	Album details	US	US Folk	US Indie	US Rock	AUS	IRE	NOR	NZ	UK
Revival	Release date: April 9, 1996; Label: Almo Sounds; Formats: CD, cassette	—	—	—	—	—	—	—	—	—
Hell Among the Yearlings	Release date: July 28, 1998; Label: Almo Sounds; Formats: CD, cassette	181	—	—	—	—	—	—	—	—
Time (The Revelator)	Release date: July 31, 2001; Label: Acony Records; Formats: CD	157	—	7	—	—	—	—	—	—
Soul Journey	Release date: June 3, 2003; Label: Acony Records; Formats: CD	107	—	3	—	69	—	—	—	65
The Harrow & the Harvest	Release date: June 28, 2011; Label: Acony Records; Formats: CD, music download	20	1	3	5	11	22	7	14	25
All the Good Times (Are Past & Gone) (with David Rawlings)	Release date: July 10, 2020; Label: Acony Records; Formats: Digital download	—	—	—	—	—	—	—	—	—
Woodland (with David Rawlings)	Release date: August 23, 2024; Label: Acony Records; Formats: CD, Digital download, Vinyl	—	—	—	—	—	—	—	—	—
"—" denotes releases that did not chart

== Live albums ==
Title	Album details	Peak chart positions								
Title	Album details	US	US Folk	US Indie	US Rock	AUS	IRE	NOR	NZ	UK
Music from the Revelator Collection	Release date: April 4, 2006; Label: Acony Records; Formats: music download	—	—	—	—	—	—	—	—	—
"—" denotes releases that did not chart

== Archival releases ==
Title	Album details	Peak chart positions								
Title	Album details	US	US Folk	US Indie	US Rock	AUS	IRE	NOR	NZ	UK
Boots No. 1: The Official Revival Bootleg	Release date: November 25, 2016; Label: Acony Records; Formats: Compact disc, music download	—	—	—	—	—	—	—	—	—
Boots No. 2: The Lost Songs, Vol. 1	Release date: July 31, 2020; Label: Acony Records; Formats: CD, music download	—	—	—	—	—	—	—	—	—
Boots No. 2: The Lost Songs, Vol. 2	Release date: September 18, 2020; Label: Acony Records; Formats: CD, music download	—	—	—	—	—	—	—	—	—
Boots No. 2: The Lost Songs, Vol. 3	Release date: November 13, 2020; Label: Acony Records; Formats: CD, music download	—	—	—	—	—	—	—	—	—
"—" denotes releases that did not chart

== Soundtracks ==
Date	Song(s)	Album	Comments
June 2, 1998	"Leaving Train"	The Horse Whisperer: Songs From and Inspired by the Motion Picture (soundtrack)	
December 5, 2000	"I'll Fly Away"; "Didn't Leave Nobody But the Baby"	O Brother, Where Art Thou? (soundtrack)	"I'll Fly Away" Listed as "Alison Krauss & Gillian Welch"; "Didn't Leave Nobody But the Baby" Listed as "Alison Krauss, Emmylou Harris & Gillian Welch"; Also credited as associate producer for album
January 23, 2001	"Wind and Rain"	Songcatcher: Music from and Inspired by the Motion Picture (soundtrack)	Performed with David Rawlings and David Steele a cappella
November 20, 2007	"Pocahontas"	Man from Plains (soundtrack)	Cover of a Neil Young song

== Tribute albums ==
Date	Song	Album	Comments
June 2, 1998	"Miner's Prayer"	Will Sing For Food: The Songs of Dwight Yoakam	Tribute album for Dwight Yoakam; Listed as "Gillian Welch & David Rawlings"
July 13, 1999	"Hickory Wind"	Return of the Grievous Angel: A Tribute to Gram Parsons	Tribute album for Gram Parsons
June 12, 2001	"Beulah Land"	Avalon Blues: A Tribute to the Music of Mississippi John Hurt	Tribute album for Mississippi John Hurt
July 10, 2001	"In Tall Buildings"	A Tribute to John Hartford: Live From Mountain Stage	Tribute album for John Hartford
September 17, 2002	"Summer Evening"	Going Driftless: An Artist's Tribute to Greg Brown	Tribute album for Greg Brown
August, 2014	"As Long as the Grass Shall Grow", "Apache Tears (Reprise)", "As Long as the Grass Shall Grow (Reprise)"	Look Again to the Wind: Johnny Cash's Bitter Tears Revisited	Tribute album for Johnny Cash; Listed as "Gillian Welch & David Rawlings"
August 5, 2022	"I Just Came Home to Count the Memories"	Something Borrowed, Something New: A Tribute to John Anderson	Tribute album for John Anderson; Listed as "Gillian Welch & David Rawlings"

== Other appearances ==
Date	Song(s)	Album	Artist
July 26, 1994	"Lynnville Train"; "The Raven and Coyote"	Gringo Honeymoon	Robert Earl Keen
July 21, 1998	"Love Still Remains"	Treasures Left Behind: Remembering Kate Wolf	Emmylou Harris
August 18, 1998	"If I Had a Hammer"	Other Voices, Too (A Trip Back to Bountiful)	Nanci Griffith
July 25, 2000	"Do Re Mi"	Swing Set	Ani DiFranco
September 26, 2000	"Prairie Wedding"; "Speedway At Nazareth"	Sailing to Philadelphia	Mark Knopfler
July 10, 2001	"Oh Death"	Clinch Mountain Sweethearts	Ralph Stanley
July 12, 2001	Several including "To Be Young", "Bartering Lines", "Shakedown on 9th St.", and "Sweet Lil' Gal"	Heartbreaker	Ryan Adams
July 31, 2001	"Five Colors"; "Love is Everywhere I Go"	Fan Dance	Sam Phillips
July 30, 2002	"Fifty Miles of Elbow Room"	Songs for Greta	James Alan Shelton
September 25, 2001	"Barstow"	Sebastopol	Jay Farrar
September 17, 2002	"Katie Dear"	Down the Old Plank Road: The Nashville Sessions	The Chieftains
September 17, 2002	"Arizona Star"; "Homeless"	The Dark	Guy Clark
September 24, 2002	"Tomorrow"	Demolition	Ryan Adams
December 3, 2002	"Hickory Wind"	Georgia Peach	Burrito Deluxe
2003	"100 Years From Now"	Revisited	Lloyd Green
February 24, 2004	Several including drums on "Big Time in the Jungle" and "Trials and Troubles"	O.C.M.S.	Old Crow Medicine Show
October 5, 2004	Several	Spooked	Robyn Hitchcock
August 29, 2006	Several	Big Iron World	Old Crow Medicine Show
March 13, 2007	"The Last Goodbye"	Waterloo, Tennessee	Uncle Earl
April 10, 2007	"Classic Cars"	Cassadaga	Bright Eyes
September 18, 2007	"Love Still Remains"; "Snake Song"	Songbird: Rare Tracks and Forgotten Gems	Emmylou Harris
July 8, 2008	"Breadline Blues 2008"	Moneyland	Del McCoury
October 21, 2008	"Tennessee Rose"	Veracruz	The Deep Vibration
February 17, 2009	"Lua"	Dark Was the Night	Listed as "Conor Oberst & Gillian Welch"
November 17, 2009	Several	A Friend of a Friend	Dave Rawlings Machine
July 26, 2010	"Did Trouble Me"; "Strange Things"	Praise & Blame	Tom Jones
September 7, 2010	"Please Release Me"; "I Really Don't Want To Know"	Mean Old Man	Jerry Lee Lewis
January 18, 2011	Several	The King is Dead	The Decemberists
November 27, 2015	"Silver Liner" and "Juanita"	Silver Liner	Ethan Johns
January 8, 2021	"Butterfly"	Greenfields	Barry Gibb
April 1, 2022	"Side Saddle"	Crooked Tree	Molly Tuttle

== Live compilations ==
Date	Song	Album	Comments
March 13, 2001	"My Morphine"	Concerts For A Landmine Free World	
April 5, 2005	"Caleb Mayer"	Bonnaroo Music Festival 2004	

== DVD ==
Year	Video
2002	The Revelator Collection: Released: November 12, 2002; Label: Acony; Format: DVD

== Music videos ==
Year	Song	Director
2001	"I'll Fly Away" (w/ Alison Krauss)	Joel Coen
2002	"Elvis Presley Blues"	Mark Seliger
2002	"My First Lover"	Mark Seliger
2002	"Revelator"	Mark Seliger
2015	"The Weekend" (w/ David Rawlings)	Reid Long
2017	"Dark Turn of Mind"	Reid Long
2017	"Cumberland Gap" (w/ David Rawlings)	James Lees
