= Stephen Marcussen =

Mastering engineer based in Hollywood

Stephen Marcussen is the founder and chief mastering engineer at Marcussen Mastering in Hollywood, California, United States. He has been mastering music since 1979.

== Biography ==
Marcussen's introduction to music recording happened in 1976 when, at the age of 19, he was offered a janitor position at Studio 55, record producer Richard Perry's Los Angeles recording studio. At Studio 55, Marcussen received an education in all facets of music recording and sound production. By the end of his Studio 55 tenure, he had earned his first album credits as an assistant engineer, working on The Manhattan Transfer's Pastiche, Boz Scaggs's Middle Man, and The Pointer Sisters's Special Things.

Marcussen began his mastering career in 1979 at a newly opened mastering facility, Precision Lacquer (later renamed "Precision Mastering"), in Los Angeles. He spent almost 20 years (1979 – February 1999) at Precision Lacquer/Mastering mastering albums for artists that included Stevie Wonder, R.E.M., Prince, The Rolling Stones, Warren Zevon, Cher, Rod Stewart, Nirvana, Roy Orbison, Dwight Yoakam, Frank Zappa, Beck, Barbra Streisand, Tom Petty and the Heartbreakers, Red Hot Chili Peppers, B.B. King, Counting Crows, and Ry Cooder, among others. Jars Of Clay Foo Fighters

In 2000, Marcussen opened Marcussen Mastering in Hollywood, California. Since opening his facility, he has been recognized for his thorough knowledge of all current audio formats. His mastering credits have grown in the subsequent 15 years to include albums by artists such as Miranda Lambert, Hozier, Gillian Welch, David Rawlings, Dawes, Shakira, Les Claypool, Jake Bugg, Kirk Whalum, The Decemberists, Gloria Trevi, Solomon Burke, Melissa Etheridge, Willie Nelson, Broken Bells, X Japan, Hillsong, Don Henley, k.d. lang, and Leonard Cohen.

In 2025, Marcussen and his wife filed a lawsuit against the city of Carpinteria and Island Brewing Company, alleging outdoor live music was too loud and in violation of city noise policies.

== Awards and nominations ==
Grammy Awards

Year	Nominee / work	Award	Result	Ref.
2017	Primus & The Chocolate Factory (5.1 Surround Sound Edition)	Grammy Award for Best Surround Sound Album	Nominated	
2014	Sailing the Seas of Cheese (Deluxe Edition)	Grammy Award for Best Surround Sound Album	Nominated	
2012	The Harrow & the Harvest	Grammy Award for Best Engineered Album, Non-Classical	Nominated	
2012	Doo-Wops & Hooligans	Grammy Award for Album of the Year	Nominated	
