= No Through Road (web series) =

British YouTube web series

- First video thumbnail of "No Through Road"
- Genre: Psychological horror, supernatural horror, analog horror, found footage
- Created by: Steven Chamberlain
- Written by: Steven Chamberlain
- Directed by: Steven Chamberlain
- Starring: Steven Chamberlain; James Williams; Oliver Campbell; Chris Hayes; David Powell
- Composers: Steven Chamberlain; Gillian Welch (sample)
- Country of origin: United Kingdom
- Original language: English
- No. of seasons: 1
- No. of episodes: 4

Production
- Cinematography: Steven Chamberlain

Original release
- Network: YouTube
- Release: 16 January 2009 – 29 August 2012

No Through Road (NTR) is a British web series written and directed by filmmaker Steven Chamberlain, who also stars. The series purports to be footage found in a discarded video camera belonging to four teenagers en route to Stevenage, England, as they find themselves trapped in a time loop, pursued by a man in a fedora and theatrical mask. The series comprises a short film and a three-part miniseries set after the movie's events.

No Through Road originated with a 2009 short film, which was based on a time loop concept developed by Chamberlain and inspired by the 1999 supernatural horror film The Blair Witch Project, the 2006 David Lynch film Inland Empire, and the 2008 psychological horror film The Strangers (from which Gillian Welch's "My First Lover" is sampled).

Chamberlain followed the short film with a three-part miniseries in mid-2011, set some time after the events of the original film. With the cast and crew initially being uncredited to maintain the illusion of the footage being real in the early days of online video platforms, the series was aired through to late-2012 on YouTube, going viral. Critical reception for No Through Road has been universally positive. The British Film Institute (BFI) have archived the first episode of No Through Road.

== Synopsis ==
=== Short film (2009) ===
No Through Road follows found footage of several seventeen-year-old boys purportedly found dead in their car ten miles from their hometown.

In the series, while driving to Stevenage, after taking a shortcut via a private "no through road" at the abandoned Broomhall Farm at night, and finding a perfectly preserved rabbit during a rest stop at the side of the road, the boys unwittingly find themselves trapped in a time loop along two road signs marking an intersection between Benington and Watton, while pursued by a mysterious hatted masked man.

=== Web series (2011–2012) ===
James, the sole survivor of the mass murder, comes back to pay tribute to his now deceased friends accompanied by another friend, Dave. But after paying tribute, similar events take place, and a familiar face reappears, along with an all too recognisable masked assailant stalking them.

== Episodes ==
=== Short film (2009) ===
Episode #	Title	Original release date	U.K. viewers (millions)	Ref(s)
1	"No Through Road (NTR1)"	16 January 2009	5.4	
Four teenagers head for Stevenage, England in a car. En route, the four come across a tunnel with a sign reading "NO THROUGH ROAD". Despite the warning, they go through the tunnel anyway, inadvertently trapping themselves in a time loop. They become increasingly panicked after encountering the same Benington-Watton street sign several times. They momentarily escape the time loop, but are suddenly teleported back to the tunnel when the driver, Ollie, turns the headlights on. A hatted masked man suddenly appears in front of the car and drags the four out of the vehicle, beating them, and kills Steven, One of the four teenagers, by beating him to death with his camera, ending the video. The description for the YouTube video reads: On 17 December 2008, four seventeen-year-old boys are said to have been found dead in their car at an abandoned farm, 10 miles from their hometown. One month later, a video containing unedited footage from a camera belonging to one of the boys, also found in the car, stolen from the British secret service, is uploaded to YouTube.

=== Web series (2011–2012) ===
Episode #	Title	Original release date	U.K. viewers (millions)	Ref(s)
2	"No Through Road 2 (NTR2)"	25 June 2011	1.0	
James, PTSD victim, and the sole survivor of the previous massacre, lays a bouquet of flowers by the road where his friends were killed. James and Dave (who is recording the tape) travel by road while discussing time-travel concepts. When night falls, the two come across the damaged Benington-Watton sign and find themselves in a time loop. James admits that it was not worth it to lay the flowers on the road. Suddenly, a bloodied Steven bangs on the car window, startling the two. The two soon realize that Steven believes it has been hours since the massacre, despite three years having passed. The description for the YouTube video reads: This is footage from the first of two tapes procured by the police following the event and code-named by MI6 as "NTR2", following James as he returns to the titular road three years later. I can only hope that they do not catch me before I obtain the second tape.
3	"No Through Road 3 (NTR3)"	16 April 2012	0.725	
The three continue to drive. James receives a call on his phone, only for the caller to not say anything. Soon after, the three encounter the masked man and attempt to run him over, only for the car to be teleported to the tunnel from the first episode. The description for the YouTube video reads: This is the beginning of the damaged tape. I'm trying to retrieve the rest.
4	"No Through Road 4 (NTR4)"	29 August 2012	0.72	
The three come across a cabin, where they find and take masks similar to those worn by the hatted masked man. The three leave and continue through the tunnel, where they again encounter the masked man. The headlights of a car turn on, revealing that the three are witnessing the events of the first episode. James quietly leaves the group with a mask in hand. The current version of Steven (NTR4-Steven) leaves to save NTR1-Steven, but is killed when NTR1-Steven beats him to death with his camera. Dave watches in shock as NTR1-Steven retreats into the darkness and the hatted masked man reappears, ending the tape. The description for the YouTube video reads: I don't know what to think anymore.

== Development ==
In November 2020, Steven Chamberlain publicly revealed himself as the director, writer, and co-star of No Through Road, with his cast and crew having initially remained uncredited to maintain the illusion of the original 2009 short film and 2011–2012 web series continuation being legitimate found footage, only naming one other cast member as Oliver (who portrays the car's driver "Ollie" and main star of the film), with the characters serving as fictionalised versions of themselves (à la The Blair Witch Project). Having made the original film as "a lark with a group of friends when they were all around 17 or 18 [before] realizing that the end result was actually pretty impressive", Chamberlain used it to earn himself a position in the University of Westminster's film program, crediting there as being "a pretty clear path back to 'No Through Road' in terms of any success that I do have currently [in my career]".

Chamberlain was inspired to make the original film in late 2008 when with his friends took to "nighttime drives" through the Stevenage countryside in another's Peugeot Quiksilver, being inspired to create the film after the friend group came across a "relatively well-known" no through road outside Broomhall Farm, remarking upon its "creepiness" and suggesting various "spur-of-the-moment" ideas to his friends, including "that sign that goes towards Benington. What if we can't escape it? How would [we] all react if they passed the sign once? Twice? Three times? And I'd just press record, we'd drive past it again, and that's what you['d] see in the film". Improvising most of the film, Chamberlain described the "lack of structure, combined with the fact that none of his friends were actors in any sense of the word" as what made the film so "believable", describing it as "sort of like lightning in a bottle – because we weren't planning on [making] it, it has that authenticity", editing together and uploading the film to YouTube (with a musical riff of Gillian Welch's "My First Lover" sampled from The Strangers included at the end) over the following weeks.

Describing The Blair Witch Project as the "unavoidable inspirational thing" behind No Through Road (although not a direct inspiration), Chamberlain elaborated on having been:

"play[ing] loosely enough with what it was doing that it managed to avoid falling into the trap of an overly-structured narrative [and] comes across as completely and utterly natural. No wonder one of the primary search terms I’ve found people inquiring about over the years isn’t just “No Through Road”, but “Is No Through Road real?”, and that while the majority of the original No Through Road video was shot in that one night, the ending – "the moment the masked figure appears in front of the tunnel, illuminated by the car’s restored headlines" – was filmed as a pickup few weeks later, with Chamberlain playing the masked figure as well as himself, wearing a trench coat, cowboy hat, and drama mask and using bit of "trick editing" to allow himself to appear as two different characters onscreen at the same time. Chamberlain was also inspired by the 2006 David Lynch film Inland Empire.

While intended as "a one-off — a self-contained unit that stood on its own as piece of found footage storytelling", development of a web series sequel began during Chamberlain's university years, casting another friend, Dave, as himself, "operat[ing] the camera throughout [most] of the three follow-ups". Unlike the original film, Chamberlain spent several brainstorming sessions developing a direction for the follow-ups, spending "a lot of evenings drinking beer and writing down ideas, and going, no, that’s too complicated, how can we make this just complicated enough that people might get it, and it would be satisfying, but not answer all the questions" before settling on a time loop as the primary concept, in leading to the "rug-pull, gut-drop moment [in No Through Road 4] when you realize that the car that's turned up is them in the past".

While filming the second installment, Chamberlain elected for a slower pace, still "largely improvised [but] a lot more restrained and had a slightly different tone to it […] seeing how real we could make this feel and how languorous the pace would be if you weren't planning on making a film", envisioning it as a way to make the film "still feel authentic and scrappy", while the third and fourth videos were developed together as a unit, the three follow-ups serving as "very much a sequel […] planned very much as a separate thing, like, if we can live up to ['No Through Road 1'], how are we going to do it?” On the fan theories resulting from the series and its meaning, Chamberlain described "the not knowing" as what had given the series such longevity, citing David Lynch and The Blair Witch Project as one of his main cinematic inspirations on depicting "the thing you don’t see", that if "there's any kind of reason behind the longevity of 'No Through Road,’ it's because I kind of took that one point on board fairly well".

In a separate interview in March 2022, Chamberlain elaborated on the films having been shot with a MiniDV, mainly from a desire to "test it out" at the age of 17, with the cast being drunk while filming the original, and that while portraying the series' masked figure, that "there were quite a few hairy moments where I had to leap and hide in the hedgerows so that I wasn’t arrested by the police for scaring the crap out of people who were just trying to drive home" due to how he was dressed. On developing the sequel web series, Chamberlain further revealed that the time loop concept had been inspired by the Doctor Who episode "Time", which had then-recently come out, "accidentally manag[ing] to capture the inherent tragedy of people that you like disappearing into a horrible scenario [while] speak[ing] to that fear that we all have.", concluding that "I'm glad that “No Through Road” is continuing to scare the crap out of people [so many] years later".

== Reception ==
"No Through Road" sign, similar to the one within the web series

=== Critical response ===
Critical reception for No Through Road has been universally positive. (Note: Attributed to multiple sources:) On the original video's initial publication, El Gore lauded the filmmakers' "admirable dedication to passing the video off as actual found footage: after an extensive Google search, the El Gore team concluded that there's no information about its production available on the Internet.

We have no idea who made this film or who stars in it, which certainly adds to the subliminal creep factor", further complimenting the "acting [a]s excellent, the conversation[s] feel[ing] natural, [and] the tension [being] palpable[:] as good as it gets in the genre and medium", as well as the use of Gillian Welch's "My First Lover" (sampled from the 2008 film The Strangers) as an "infinitely creepy record loop on the radio", alongside other clips added randomly throughout the film, as "greatly enhanc[ing] the eerie atmosphere" of the film, and concluding to describe the "spine-chilling short [as] undoubtedly one of the best low-budget horror films I've [ever] seen".

In 2020, CoryxKenshin reacted to the original short film and applauded heavily for its creepy and terrifying sound design. In 2023 IShowSpeed reacted to the short film and was terrified by the ending and actually believed that it was a real snuff film uploaded by the government. In 2020, famous youtuber Jacksepticeye reacted to the short film and also applauded the series and hoped that the people who made the video had a good career in film in their later lives.

The Ghost in My Machine lauded No Through Road as "tak[ing] the phrase "hopelessly lost" to a whole new level", with Refinery29 complimenting the series' use of screams, recommending it to be watched to "keep you up at night" with a blanket (to scream into). While recognising the series' "quarter of a shoestring" budget and "deeply bizarre" premise, Film School Rejects nonetheless praised No Through Road as "deliver[ing] some very nice chills", noting the use of a slow burn while complimenting the acting of the films "British teens [as] feel[ing] far less annoying than American ones", concluding to sum up the first installment as "a spooky little film that feels a bit like a campfire tale". Bustle described the "weird-o" series as "a masterful example of excellent storytelling done on a tiny budget, exemplifying the fact that you don't need a ton of money to make a really freaky movie", with "the first video [standing] alone quite well" and instilling a feeling of "never want[ing] to drive home at night again".

TREMG described the series as "an absolute must-see if you're a fan of found-footage-style horror", with the "camerawork and acting put into this project [being] extremely impressive, making it worth a watch as you get into the Halloween spirit", with Postize giving the series an 8/10 on their "Disturbance Factor". Ranking the series as the second on their 2021 list of "The Best Original Horror On YouTube", Looper complimented all four installments of No Through Road as "wonderfully creepy videos that will satisfy anyone hungry for horror", with Horror Obsessive praising its "incredibly effective [use of] basically nothing but dialogue and a few spooky shots" throughout the series. The British Film Institute (BFI) have archived the first episode of No Through Road.

== Other media ==
The audio commentary of the 2012 Canadian supernatural horror film Grave Encounters 2, directed by John Poliquin and written by The Vicious Brothers, credits the film's closing kill — in which a character (Leanne Lapp) is beaten to death with a video camera, from the first-person perspective of the camera — to the filmmakers having seen the same event take place in No Through Road, and having been impressed by the concept enough to adapt it (amongst allusions to several other popular horror films).

On the director's commentary for In Fear, a 2013 British psychological horror film written and directed by Jeremy Lovering, Lovering accredited No Through Road (for which Chamberlain was originally uncredited) as the primary source of inspiration for the film's main plot and premise, which follows a young couple (Iain De Caestecker and Alice Englert) as they find themselves trapped in a loop between two road signs in the Irish countryside at night, while pursued by an unknown masked assailant (Allen Leech).

An unauthorised Swedish-language remake of the series, directed by Tobias Ohlsson, was nominated for the "Best Experimental Horror Film Award" at the Oregon Scream Week Horror Film Festival in late 2019.

== See also ==
- Marble Hornets
