= Nashville Obsolete =

Studio album by Dave Rawlings Machine
- Released: September 2015
- Recorded: Woodland (Nashville, Tennessee)
- Genre: Folk
- Label: Acony
- Producer: David Rawlings

Dave Rawlings Machine chronology
A Friend of a Friend (2009)	Nashville Obsolete (2015)

Nashville Obsolete is the second studio album released by Dave Rawlings Machine, project consisting of guitarist Dave Rawlings with long-time partner Gillian Welch. It was released on September 18, 2015.

== Track listing ==
All tracks are written by Gillian Welch and David Rawlings.

Nashville Obsolete track listing
No.	Title	Length
1.	"The Weekend"	5:29
2.	"Short Haired Woman Blues"	6:43
3.	"The Trip"	10:55
4.	"Bodysnatchers"	5:56
5.	"The Last Pharaoh"	3:37
6.	"Candy"	4:10
7.	"Pilgrim (You Can't Go Home)"	7:57
