= I Had a Good Father and Mother =

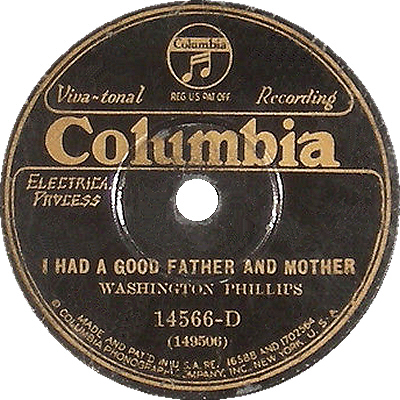

Single by Washington Phillips
- Recorded: Dallas, Texas, December 2, 1929
- Genre: Gospel blues
- Length: 3:01
- Label: Columbia
- Songwriter: Washington Phillips
- Producer: Frank B. Walker

"I Had a Good Father and Mother" is a 1929 gospel blues song by Washington Phillips (1880–1954, vocals and zither). The song has sometimes been covered as "I Had a Good Mother and Father"; or with, in both cases, "Real" inserted before "Good".

Unusually, the song does not have a conventional refrain; instead, the verses are separated by a wordless vocalise.

The final verse reflects a concept mentioned several times in the Gospel of John:

- A new commandment I give unto you, That ye love one another; as I have loved you, that ye also love one another. – John 13:34
- As the Father hath loved me, so have I loved you: continue ye in my love. – John 15:9
- This is my commandment, That ye love one another, as I have loved you. – John 15:12

The recording history suggests that the song was composed by Phillips himself: there seems to be no earlier or contemporary version, nor any cover version until 64 years after his recording of the song.

== Recordings ==
- 1929 – Washington Phillips, 10-inch 78 rpm single Columbia 14566-D
- 1993 – Palace Brothers on the album There Is No-One What Will Take Care of You
- 1994 – Kate Wolf on the album Looking Back at You
- 2003 – Gillian Welch on the album Soul Journey
- 2004 – Paul Rishell and Annie Raines on the album Goin' Home
- 2016 – The Lower Lights on the album A Hymn Revival, Vol. 3
