= Woodland (album) =

Studio album by Gillian Welch and David Rawlings
- Released: August 23, 2024
- Studio: Woodland (Nashville, Tennessee)
- Length: 40:57
- Label: Acony
- Producer: David Rawlings

Gillian Welch chronology
All the Good Times (Are Past & Gone) (2020)	Woodland (2024)

David Rawlings chronology
All the Good Times (Are Past & Gone) (2020)	Woodland (2024)

Singles from Woodland
- 1. "Empty Trainload of Sky" Released: July 19, 2024; 2. "Hashtag" Released: August 9, 2024

Woodland is the seventh studio album by Gillian Welch, the third studio album by David Rawlings (his fifth including his studio work with Dave Rawlings Machine), and the second studio album to be credited to the pair as a duo. Released by Acony Records on August 23, 2024, it is the first album of original material from Welch since 2011's The Harrow & the Harvest, and from Rawlings since 2017's Poor David's Almanack. Their 2020 album, All the Good Times (Are Past & Gone), consisted entirely of covers of preexisting songs.

The album is named after Welch and Rawlings' Woodland Sound Studios in Nashville, Tennessee, which was destroyed by a tornado in 2020. The artists stated in a press release that the songs on Woodland are "a swirl of contradictions, emptiness, fullness, joy, grief, destruction, [and] permanence."

The album won the 2025 Grammy Award for Best Folk Album.

== Singles ==
The first single from the album, "Empty Trainload of Sky", was released on July 19, 2024. It was followed by "Hashtag" on August 9.

== Critical reception ==
=== Year-end lists ===
Numerous critics and publications listed Woodland in their year-end ranking of the best albums of 2024, often inside the top ten.

Select year-end rankings for Woodland
Publication/critic	Accolade	Rank	Ref.
MOJO	The Best Albums Of 2024	4	
Uncut	80 Best Albums of 2024	2	

== Track listing ==
All tracks are written by Gillian Welch and David Rawlings.

Woodland track listing
No.	Title	Length
1.	"Empty Trainload of Sky"	3:24
2.	"What We Had"	3:58
3.	"Lawman"	4:31
4.	"The Bells and the Birds"	3:13
5.	"North Country"	5:12
6.	"Hashtag"	3:34
7.	"The Day the Mississippi Died"	4:55
8.	"Turf the Gambler"	2:49
9.	"Here Stands a Woman"	5:17
10.	"Howdy Howdy"	4:05
Total length:		40:57

== Personnel ==
=== Gillian Welch & David Rawlings ===
- Gillian Welch – vocals (all tracks), guitar (tracks 1–9), bass (2), banjo (10)
- David Rawlings – vocals, guitar (all tracks); organ (tracks 1, 7), string arrangement (2, 6), guitjo (3), harmonica (8)

=== Additional musicians ===
- Russ Pahl – pedal steel (tracks 1, 2, 5, 6)
- Chris Powell – drums (tracks 1, 2, 5, 7)
- Brian Allen – bass (tracks 1, 5)
- Kristin Wilkinson – section leader, viola (tracks 2, 6)
- David Davidson – violin (tracks 2, 6)
- Jung-Min Shin – violin (tracks 2, 6)
- Mary Kathryn Van Osdale – violin (tracks 2, 6)
- Jenny Bifano – violin (tracks 2, 6)
- David Angell – violin (tracks 2, 6)
- Wei Tsun Chang – violin (tracks 2, 6)
- Janet Darnell – violin (tracks 2, 6)
- Annaliese Kowert – violin (tracks 2, 6)
- Chris Farrell – viola (tracks 2, 6)
- Monisa Angell – viola (tracks 2, 6)
- Seanad Chang – viola (tracks 2, 6)
- Kevin Bate – cello (tracks 2, 6)
- Austin Hoke – cello (tracks 2, 6)
- Alicia Enstrom – violin (track 6)
- Betsy Lamb – viola (track 6)
- Jennifer Kummer – French horn (track 6)
- Patrick Walle – French horn (track 6)
- Morgan Jahnig – bass (track 7)
- Ketch Secor – fiddle (track 7)

=== Technical and visuals ===
- David Rawlings – production, mixing (all tracks); engineering (tracks 3, 4, 6, 8–10); mastering
- Matt Andrews – engineering (tracks 1, 2, 4–10), mixing (2, 4, 8–10)
- Ken Scott – engineering (tracks 1, 2, 5–7)
- Brent Bishop – engineering assistance (tracks 1, 2, 5–7); additional engineering, technical support
- Barry Wolifson – additional engineering, technical support
- Ted Jensen – mastering
- Alysse Gafkjen – photography
- Lawrence Azerrad – graphic design

== Charts ==
Chart performance for Woodland
Chart (2024–2025)	Peak position
Australian Albums (ARIA)	84
Belgian Albums (Ultratop Flanders)	137
Dutch Albums (Album Top 100)	95
Scottish Albums (OCC)	45
Swiss Albums (Schweizer Hitparade)	74
UK Americana Albums (OCC)	2
UK Independent Albums (OCC)	5
US Top Album Sales (Billboard)	36
