= Denise Stiff =

- Occupation: Personal manager

Denise Stiff is an American manager of contemporary musicians. She was the long-time manager of Alison Krauss and was Gillian Welch's manager. She also served as Executive Music Producer for the 2000 film O Brother, Where Art Thou?.

On August 29, 2023, Stiff was inducted into the SOURCE Nashville Hall of Fame, honoring the contributions of women in Nashville's music industry.
