= Soul Journey =

Studio album by Gillian Welch
- Released: June 9, 2003
- Studio: Gillian Welch's Home; RCA Studio B (Nashville, Tennessee); Woodland (Nashville, Tennessee)
- Length: 39:07
- Label: Acony
- Producer: David Rawlings

Gillian Welch chronology
Time (The Revelator) (2001)	Soul Journey (2003)	The Harrow & the Harvest (2011)

Professional ratings
Aggregate scores
Source	Rating
Metacritic	78/100
Review scores
Source	Rating
AllMusic	3.5/5 stars
Blender	3/5 stars
Entertainment Weekly	A−
The Guardian	4/5 stars
Los Angeles Times	3.5/4 stars
Mojo	5/5 stars
Pitchfork	7.1/10
Q	3/5 stars
Rolling Stone	2/5 stars
Uncut	4/5 stars

Soul Journey is the fourth studio album by American singer-songwriter Gillian Welch. It was released on June 9, 2003, by Acony Records. As with all of her previous releases, it is a collaboration with David Rawlings.

== Background ==
The album was something of a departure from previous albums by Welch and Rawlings in terms of instrumentation, including a larger band and instruments like drums and an electric bass. Welch has described the album as "more spontaneous" than some of her previous works.

== Reception ==
Soul Journey received generally favorable reviews.

Several outlets, including Mojo called it "perfect", with reviewers praising the wistful tone and instrumentation of the album. The Guardian said of her work "[Welch] strips country back to its spiritual and storytelling roots... Welch has refined her bare and beautiful songs and on Soul Journey embraces the blues. Loss and loneliness are her closest friends"

Upon the vinyl re-release in 2018 Relix said the album contained "some of their most indelible songs... Soul Journey makes it equally hard to tell where the past ended and the present began, or remember why anybody ever thought there was a difference."

However, some have expressed disappointment in the album. Pitchfork described it as "a tad raptureless" and others were displeased with the fuller, multi-instrument sound. Welch has said in response that "on some level, it should be a departure from other albums... Everything's not supposed to sound the same, you want it to reflect change and growth."

== Track listing ==
All tracks are written by Gillian Welch and David Rawlings unless otherwise noted.

Soul Journey track listing
No.	Title	Length
1.	"Look at Miss Ohio"	4:16
2.	"Make Me a Pallet on Your Floor" (Traditional; additional lyrics by Welch)	2:45
3.	"Wayside/Back in Time"	3:28
4.	"I Had a Real Good Mother and Father" (Traditional; additional lyrics by Welch)	3:14
5.	"One Monkey"	5:36
6.	"No One Knows My Name"	3:16
7.	"Lowlands"	3:19
8.	"One Little Song" (Welch)	3:12
9.	"I Made a Lovers Prayer"	5:03
10.	"Wrecking Ball"	4:56
Total length:		38:07

== Personnel ==
- Mark Ambrose – acoustic guitar
- Matt Andrews – bass guitar (on "Lowlands")
- Jim Boquist – bass guitar
- Greg Leisz – Dobro
- Ketcham Secor – fiddle
- Gillian Welch – "everything else"
- David Rawlings – "everything else"

== Charts ==
Chart performance for Soul Journey
Chart (2003)	Peak position
Australian Albums (ARIA)	69
UK Albums (OCC)	65
US Billboard 200	107
US Independent Albums (Billboard)	1
US Heatseekers Albums (Billboard)	10
