= All the Good Times (Are Past & Gone) =

Studio album by Gillian Welch and David Rawlings
- Released: 10 July 2020
- Studio: Woodland (Nashville, Tennessee)
- Length: 38:46
- Label: Acony
- Producer: David Rawlings

Gillian Welch chronology
The Harrow & The Harvest (2011)	All the Good Times (Are Past & Gone) (2020)	Woodland (2024)

David Rawlings chronology
Poor David's Almanack (2017)	All the Good Times (Are Past & Gone) (2020)	Woodland (2024)

Professional ratings
Review scores
Source	Rating
Americana UK	7/10
The Guardian	3/5 stars
Uncut	4.5/5 stars

All the Good Times (Are Past & Gone) is the sixth studio album by Gillian Welch, the second solo studio album by David Rawlings (his fourth including his studio work with the Dave Rawlings Machine), and the first studio album officially credited to both Welch and Rawlings together. It was released in 2020 and won the 2021 Grammy award for Best Folk Album. The album consists entirely of cover songs and traditional folk material, all presented in newly developed arrangements. Although Welch and Rawlings have collaborated extensively for many years through songwriting, studio work, and touring, this release marked the first time their music was issued as a fully joint album.

== Track listing ==
All the Good Times (Are Past & Gone) track listing
No.	Title	Writer(s)	Length
1.	"Oh Babe It Ain't No Lie"	Elizabeth Cotten	4:25
2.	"Señor"	Bob Dylan	5:27
3.	"Fly Around My Pretty Little Miss"	Traditional	2:34
4.	"Hello in There"	John Prine	5:42
5.	"Poor Ellen Smith"	Traditional	3:30
6.	"All the Good Times Are Past and Gone"	Traditional	3:54
7.	"Ginseng Sullivan"	Norman Blake	3:43
8.	"Abandoned Love"	Bob Dylan	3:44
9.	"Jackson"	Billy Edd Wheeler, Jerry Lieber	3:27
10.	"Y'all Come"	Arlie Duff	2:23

== Personnel ==
=== Musicians ===
- Gillian Welch – vocals, guitar
- David Rawlings – guitar, vocals

=== Other ===
- Produced by David Rawlings
- Arrangement of traditional songs by Gillian Welch and David Rawlings
- Recording and mastering by David Rawlings and Matt Andrews
- Cover artwork by Peter Nevins and David Rawlings

== Awards and nominations ==
Nominations for All the Good Times (Are Past & Gone)
Year	Ceremony	Category	Result
2021	Grammy Awards	Best Folk Album	Won
