= Revival (Gillian Welch album) =

Studio album by Gillian Welch
- Released: April 9, 1996
- Studios: Ocean Way (Hollywood, California); Sound Factory (Hollywood, California); Sunset Sound (Hollywood, California); Woodland (Nashville, Tennessee)
- Genres: Country, folk, bluegrass
- Length: 41:21
- Label: Almo Sounds
- Producer: T Bone Burnett

Gillian Welch chronology
Revival (1996)	Hell Among the Yearlings (1998)

Revival is the first album by American singer-songwriter Gillian Welch, released on April 9, 1996. Revival was nominated for the 1997 Grammy Award for Best Contemporary Folk Album.

The plant described in the song, "Acony Bell" appears to be Shortia galacifolia, also known as the Oconee bells. Welch later began her own record label under the name Acony. To celebrate the album's 20th anniversary, Welch re-released Revival as Boots No 1: The Official Revival Bootleg which included demos, outtakes and alternate versions of the tracks in addition to eight new songs.

== Music ==
Josh Jackson of Paste Magazine wrote: "Gillian Welch and her musical partner may have hailed from Los Angeles and Rhode Island, respectively, but they arrived on the alt-country scene in 1996 as if they’d just melted out of Depression-era Appalachian Mountain ice."

== Reception ==
Professional ratings
Review scores
Source	Rating
AllMusic	4/5 stars
Chicago Sun-Times	3/4 stars
Entertainment Weekly	A
Los Angeles Times	4/4 stars
Rolling Stone	2/5 stars
The Rolling Stone Album Guide	3.5/5 stars
Uncut	4/5 stars
The Village Voice	B−

Mark Deming of AllMusic called it a "superb debut" and wrote, "Welch's debts to artists of the past are obvious and clearly acknowledged, but there's a maturity, intelligence, and keen eye for detail in her songs you wouldn't expect from someone simply trying to ape the Carter Family." Bill Friskics-Warren of No Depression praised the album as "breathtakingly austere evocations of rural culture." Ann Powers of Rolling Stone gave Revival a lukewarm review and criticized Welch for not singing of her own experiences, and "manufacturing emotion." Robert Christgau wrote Welch "just doesn't have the voice, eye, or way with words to bring her simulation off." Josh Jackson of Paste wrote: "Every subsequent album has contained alt-country gems, but it’s nearly impossible to surpass this perfect debut."

== Track listing ==
All tracks are written by Gillian Welch and David Rawlings, except where noted.

No.	Title	Length
1.	"Orphan Girl" (Gillian Welch)	3:57
2.	"Annabelle" (Welch)	4:03
3.	"Pass You By"	3:57
4.	"Barroom Girls"	4:14
5.	"One More Dollar"	4:34
6.	"By the Mark"	3:40
7.	"Paper Wings"	3:57
8.	"Tear My Stillhouse Down" (Welch)	4:32
9.	"Acony Bell"	3:06
10.	"Only One and Only"	5:33
Total length:		41:21

== Personnel ==
- Gillian Welch – vocals, guitar
- David Rawlings – guitar, vocals, bass, Optigan
- James Burton – guitar, National Steel guitar
- Armando Campean – bass
- Buddy Harman – drums
- John Hughey – pedal steel
- Roy Huskey Jr. – bass
- Jay Joyce – E-Bow, guitar
- Jim Keltner – drums
- Greg Leisz – Dobro, Weissenborn
- T Bone Burnett – Optigan
