= Heartbreaker (Ryan Adams album) =

Studio album by Ryan Adams
- Released: September 5, 2000
- Recorded: Woodland (Nashville, Tennessee)
- Genres: Alternative country; roots rock
- Length: 51:57
- Label: Bloodshot
- Producer: Ethan Johns

Ryan Adams chronology
Heartbreaker (2000)	Gold (2001)

Heartbreaker is the debut solo studio album by American singer-songwriter Ryan Adams, released on September 5, 2000, by Bloodshot Records. The album was recorded over 14 days at Woodland Studios in Nashville, Tennessee. It was nominated for the 2001 Shortlist Music Prize. The album is said to be inspired by Adams' break-up with music industry publicist Amy Lombardi.

According to Adams, the album's title originates from a poster of Mariah Carey: "My manager called and said, 'You have 15 seconds to name this record,' "My eyes focused on this poster of Mariah wearing a T-shirt that said HEARTBREAKER. I just shouted, 'Heartbreaker!'"

A Deluxe Edition, featuring bonus recording session takes and pre-album demos, was released on May 6, 2016 on PAX-AM records.

== Critical reception ==
Professional ratings
Review scores
Source	Rating
AllMusic	4/5 stars
American Songwriter	4.5/5 stars
Entertainment Weekly	B+
The Guardian	4/5 stars
NME	8/10
Pitchfork	9.0/10
Q	4/5 stars
Rolling Stone	3/5 stars
The Rolling Stone Album Guide	4.5/5 stars
Uncut	9/10

Heartbreaker was considered by critics to be a fresh start for Ryan Adams after the demise of his previous band Whiskeytown. AllMusic's Mark Derning wrote that the album "is loose, open, and heartfelt in a way Whiskeytown's admittedly fine albums never were, and makes as strong a case for Adams' gifts as anything his band ever released", concluding that "the strength of the material and the performances suggest Adams is finally gaining some much-needed maturity, and his music is all the better for it." The A.V. Club's Keith Phipps wrote: "Adams has recorded an intimate, largely quiet record that indisputably establishes his identity as an independent singer-songwriter". Pitchfork's Steven Byrd called it "an album of astonishing musical proficiency, complete honesty and severe beauty." Rolling Stone's Anthony DeCurtis was less enthusiastic, stating that Adams' songs "too often fail to rise above their plain-spoken details to take on the symbolic power he yearns for". Robert Christgau of The Village Voice selected "To Be Young (Is to Be Sad, Is to Be High)" as a "choice cut", indicating a "good song on an album that isn't worth your time or money."

The album was included in the book 1001 Albums You Must Hear Before You Die and was placed at #23 on Paste Magazine's "The 50 Best Albums of the Decade" list.

== Track listing ==
All tracks are written by Ryan Adams, except where noted.

No.	Title	Writer(s)	Length
1.	"(Argument with David Rawlings Concerning Morrissey)"		0:37^{[a]}
2.	"To Be Young (Is to Be Sad, Is to Be High)"	Ryan Adams, David Rawlings	3:04
3.	"My Winding Wheel"		3:13
4.	"Amy"		3:46
5.	"Oh My Sweet Carolina"		4:57
6.	"Bartering Lines"	Ryan Adams, Van Alston	3:59
7.	"Call Me On Your Way Back Home"		3:09
8.	"Damn, Sam (I Love a Woman That Rains)"		2:08
9.	"Come Pick Me Up"	Ryan Adams, Van Alston	5:18
10.	"To Be the One"		3:01
11.	"Why Do They Leave?"		3:38
12.	"Shakedown on 9th Street"		2:53
13.	"Don't Ask for the Water"		2:56
14.	"In My Time of Need"		5:39
15.	"Sweet Lil Gal (23rd/1st)"		3:39

French bonus CD, Unreleased Tracks from the Heartbreaker sessions
No.	Title	Writer(s)	Length
1.	"Goodbye Honey"
2.	"To Be Young (Is To Be Sad Is To Be High)" (Acoustic version)	Ryan Adams, David Rawlings

Heartbreaker Deluxe Edition Box Set (2016) CD - Disc 2, Original Album Sessions
No.	Title	Writer(s)	Length
1.	"Hairdresser On Fire" (Outtake from Original Album Session)	Morrissey / Stephen Street
2.	"To Be Young (Is to Be Sad, Is to Be High)" (Outtake from Original Album Session)	Ryan Adams, David Rawlings
3.	"Petal in a Rainstorm" (Outtake from Original Album Session)
4.	"War Horse" (Outtake from Original Album Session)
5.	"Oh My Sweet Carolina" (Outtake from Original Album Session)
6.	"Come Pick Me Up" (Outtake from Original Album Session)	Ryan Adams, Van Alston
7.	"Punk Jam" (Outtake from Original Album Session)
8.	"When the Rope Gets Tight" (Alternative Version, Outtake from Original Album Session)
9.	"When the Rope Gets Tight" (Outtake from Original Album Session)
10.	"Goodbye Honey" (Bonus Track from Original Release)
11.	"In My Time of Need" (Outtake from Original Album Session)
12.	"Bartering Lines" (Album Demo)	Ryan Adams, Van Alston
13.	"Come Pick Me Up" (Album Demo)	Ryan Adams, Van Alston
14.	"To Be the One" (Album Demo)
15.	"Don't Ask for the Water" (Album Demo)
16.	"In My Time of Need" (Album Demo)
17.	"Goodbye Honey" (Album Demo)
18.	"Petal in a Rainstorm" (Album Demo)
19.	"War Horse" (Album Demo)
20.	"Locked Away" (Outtake from Original Album Session)

Heartbreaker Deluxe Edition Box Set (2016) DVD - Disc 3, Live New York show at the Mercury Lounge in October 2000
No.	Title	Writer(s)	Length
1.	"Oh My Sweet Carolina" (Live at the Mercury Lounge, NYC, Oct. 2000)
2.	"Gimme Sunshine" (Live at the Mercury Lounge, NYC, Oct. 2000)
3.	"To Be Young (Is to Be Sad, Is to Be High)" (Live at the Mercury Lounge, NYC, Oct. 2000)
4.	"Amy" (Live at the Mercury Lounge, NYC, Oct. 2000)
5.	"Call Me On Your Way Back Home" (Live at the Mercury Lounge, NYC, Oct. 2000)
6.	"Just Like a Whore" (Live at the Mercury Lounge, NYC, Oct. 2000)
7.	"Wonderwall" (Live at the Mercury Lounge, NYC, Oct. 2000)	Noel Gallagher
8.	"Damn, Sam (I Love a Woman That Rains)" (Live at the Mercury Lounge, NYC, Oct. 2000)
9.	"Sweet Lil Gal (23rd/1st)" (Live at the Mercury Lounge, NYC, Oct. 2000)
10.	"Come Pick Me Up" (Live at the Mercury Lounge, NYC, Oct. 2000)	Ryan Adams, Van Alston
11.	"My Winding Wheel" (Live at the Mercury Lounge, NYC, Oct. 2000)

- ^{^[a]} A brief recording of Adams and Rawlings arguing about which album the track "Suedehead" appears on.

== Personnel ==
=== Musicians ===
- Ryan Adams – vocals, acoustic guitar, electric guitar, harmonica, piano, banjo
- Ethan Johns – drums, bass, Chamberlain, glockenspiel, B-3, vibes
- David Rawlings – backing vocals, acoustic guitar, electric guitar, banjo, tambourine
- Gillian Welch – backing vocals, banjo, acoustic guitar, electric bass, "voice of Lucy"
- Pat Sansone – piano (5, 9, 11), Chamberlin and organ (6), backing vocals (2)
- Emmylou Harris – backing vocals (5)
- Kim Richey – backing vocals (9)
- Allison Pierce – backing vocals (11)

=== Production ===
- Ethan Johns – producer, engineer, mixer
- Patrick Himes – assistant engineer
- Doug Sax – mastering
- David McClister – photography
- Gina Binkley – design

== Heartbreaker '25 World Tour ==
In late 2024, Adams announced plans for his Heartbreaker '25 World Tour in support of the 25th anniversary of his debut album, Heartbreaker. The tour, according to a press release, "is set to offer up an intimate, acoustic set that highlights his massive career." The tour began in Australia on October 4, 2024 and ran until November 27, 2024 in New York. It then resumed in March 2025 in Norway and concluded on June 28, 2025 in Charles Town, West Virginia.

== Other information ==
"Shakedown on 9th Street" was covered on the Red Dirt band No Justice's Live at Billy Bob's album in 2007.

"Oh My Sweet Carolina" has been covered at least twice. The song can be heard on the deluxe edition of Zac Brown Band's 2010 album, You Get What You Give, as well as on the 2008 Portastatic release, Some Small History. Contestant Paul McDonald sang "Come Pick Me Up" on American Idol.

English DJ Mark Ronson remixed the song "Amy" for his 2007 album, Version, of which singer Kenna provides vocals. The song "To Be Young (Is To Be Sad, Is To Be High)" is featured in the 2006 film Accepted, the 2002 film The Slaughter Rule, and the 2003 film Old School. A version of this song was also released in 2009 by David Rawlings on the Dave Rawlings Machine album A Friend of a Friend. "Come Pick Me Up" is featured in the film Elizabethtown (which also featured two other Ryan Adams songs) and in a Series 2 episode of Skins. It was also named #285 on Pitchfork's "Top 500 songs of the 2000s". Joan Baez would cover "In My Time of Need" in 2003.

Elton John has famously credited the Heartbreaker album as helping to regenerate his career and in 2002 he performed songs from it with Adams and did a joint interview with him where he thanked Adams.

== Charts ==
=== Album ===
Country	Peak position
Ireland	67
U.S. (2016)	140
UK	183
