= Hell Among the Yearlings =

Studio album by Gillian Welch
- Released: July 28, 1998
- Genre: Country; bluegrass
- Length: 38:58
- Label: Acony
- Producer: T Bone Burnett

Gillian Welch chronology
Revival (1996)	Hell Among the Yearlings (1998)	Time (The Revelator) (2001)

Professional ratings
Review scores
Source	Rating
AllMusic	4/5 stars
Entertainment Weekly	A−
Houston Chronicle	4/5 stars
Los Angeles Times	3/4 stars
Pitchfork	8.7/10
Q	4/5 stars
Rolling Stone	3/5 stars
The Rolling Stone Album Guide	3/5 stars
Uncut	4/5 stars

Hell Among the Yearlings is the second studio album by American singer-songwriter Gillian Welch, released on July 28, 1998.

== Track listing ==
All tracks are written by Gillian Welch and David Rawlings

Hell Among the Yearlings track listing
No.	Title	Length
1.	"Caleb Meyer"	3:05
2.	"Good Til Now"	3:56
3.	"The Devil Had a Hold of Me"	4:30
4.	"My Morphine"	5:53
5.	"One Morning"	2:41
6.	"Miner's Refrain"	3:57
7.	"Honey Now"	1:52
8.	"I'm Not Afraid to Die"	3:27
9.	"Rock of Ages"	3:08
10.	"Whiskey Girl"	4:15
11.	"Winter's Come and Gone"	2:14
Total length:		38:58

== Musicians ==
- Gillian Welch: Acoustic guitar, vocal
- David Rawlings: Acoustic guitar, vocal

Tracks 3, 5, 9

- Gillian Welch: Banjo, vocal
- David Rawlings: Acoustic guitar, vocal

Track 7

- Gillian Welch: Acoustic guitar, bass, kick drum, vocal
- David Rawlings: Electric guitar, snare drum, vocal

Track 10

- Gillian Welch: Acoustic guitar, vocal
- David Rawlings: Electric guitar
- T Bone Burnett: Piano, Hammond B3

Production

- Assistant engineers: Nick Raskulinecz, Matt Andrews, John Skinner, Robi Banerji, King Williams
- Mastered by Doug Sax at The Mastering Lab, Hollywood CA
- Creative direction: Tony Maxwell

All musician and production credits were taken from the CD liner notes.

== Charts ==
Chart performance for Hell Among the Yearlings
Chart (1998)	Peak position
US Billboard 200	181
US Heatseekers Albums (Billboard)	9
