= Time (The Revelator) =

Studio album by Gillian Welch
- Released: July 31, 2001
- Studios: RCA Studio B (Nashville, Tennessee)
- Genre: Alternative country
- Length: 51:34
- Label: Acony
- Producer: David Rawlings

Gillian Welch chronology
Hell Among the Yearlings (1998)	Time (The Revelator) (2001)	Soul Journey (2003)

Time (The Revelator) is the third studio album by American singer-songwriter Gillian Welch, co-written with David Rawlings. It was recorded at RCA Studio B, except one track ("I Want to Sing That Rock and Roll") recorded live at Ryman Auditorium for the concert film Down from the Mountain.

== Recording ==
Welch said of recording "Revelator," "It was a mic test – the version on the record. Dave just said, 'play 'Revelator' and it was okay, let's try it and we used the mic test." Rawlings added, "We played it once and it was great because we hadn't played it in months. We got that first take feeling."

According to Rawlings, "I Dream a Highway" had never been played before it was recorded. "So, we played it twice and I edited both versions together. But, I wanted that because I knew it was a minor song that had ... There was a lot that could happen with the harmonies and the guitar playing than if we'd done it a lot of times, so we could just travel through a lot more of it than if we knew where we were supposed to start and where we were supposed to end."

== Critical reception ==
Professional ratings
Aggregate scores
Source	Rating
Metacritic	86/100
Review scores
Source	Rating
AllMusic	4.5/5 stars
Chicago Sun-Times	4/4 stars
Entertainment Weekly	A−
The Guardian	4/5 stars
Los Angeles Times	3/4 stars
Pitchfork	8.1/10 (2002); 9.6/10 (2023)
Q	4/5 stars
Rolling Stone	3.5/5 stars
The Rolling Stone Album Guide	4/5 stars
Spin	5/10

Welch and Rawlings received a great deal of recognition for their work on Time. The album received many award nominations and was included on many "best album of the year" lists by critics. It has since been included on a number of "best of all time" lists.

In 2009, the album was ranked number 7 on Paste's "The 50 Best Albums of the Decade" list. It was also included in the book 1001 Albums You Must Hear Before You Die. The album was ranked 64 on Rolling Stone magazine's list of the 100 greatest albums of the decade, and in 2020 the album was ranked number 348 in their updated list of the 500 Greatest Albums of All Time.

=== Awards ===
Although Welch and Rawlings did not win in any category, the duo received four nominations at the first annual awards for the Americana Music Association in 2002. Time (The Revelator) was nominated for Album of the Year, and "I Want to Sing That Rock and Roll" was nominated for Song of the Year (prizes that went to Buddy and Julie Miller's Buddy & Julie Miller and "She's Looking at Me" by Jim Lauderdale, Ralph Stanley and the Clinch Mountain Boys). Welch and Rawlings together were nominated for Artist of the Year while Rawlings was nominated for Instrumentalist of the Year (awarded to Jim Lauderdale and Jerry Douglas respectively).

The album was nominated for Best Contemporary Folk Album at the 2002 Grammy Awards, but lost out to Bob Dylan's Love and Theft.

=== Best album of the year lists ===
Appearances on best album of the year lists
Publication	List title	Rank
Addicted to Noise (US)	2002: Fifth Annual International Music Writers Poll	10
Amazon.com (US)	Top 100 Editors' Picks: Music	57
Barnes & Noble.com (US)	Albums of the Year	52
BigO (Singapore)	Albums of the Year	12
E! Online (US)	Top 25 CDs	no order
Heaven (Netherlands)	Albums of the Year	3
Les Inrockuptibles (France)	Albums of the Year	15
Mojo (UK)	Albums of the Year	4
The New Yorker (US)	Twelve Favorites from our 2001 CD Rotation	no order
OOR (Netherlands)	Albums of the Year	25
Rock's Back Pages	Best of the Year: RBP's Albums of 2001	10
Uncut (UK)	Albums of the Year	33
Village Voice (US)	Annual Pazz & Jop Critic's Poll	14
Washington City Paper (US)	The CP Top 20 of 2001	33
WFUV, New York City (US)	Best of 2001 FUV staff Picks	no order
WUMB, Boston (US)	Top Ten 2001	3

== Track listing ==
All songs written by Gillian Welch and David Rawlings.

1. "Revelator" – 6:22
2. "My First Lover" – 3:47
3. "Dear Someone" – 3:14
4. "Red Clay Halo" – 3:14
5. "April the 14th Part 1" – 5:10
6. "I Want to Sing That Rock and Roll" – 2:51
7. "Elvis Presley Blues" – 4:53
8. "Ruination Day Part 2" – 2:36
9. "Everything Is Free" – 4:48
10. "I Dream a Highway" – 14:39

== Credits ==
=== Musicians ===
- Gillian Welch – banjo, guitar, vocals
- David Rawlings – guitar, vocals

=== Production ===
- Recorded at RCA Studio B, Nashville, Tennessee
- Produced by David Rawlings
- Engineered by Matt Andrews
- except "I Want to Sing That Rock and Roll":
  - Recorded live at the Ryman Auditorium, Nashville, Tennessee
  - Produced by T-Bone Burnett
  - Engineered by Mike Piersante and Matt Andrews
  - Also available on Down from the Mountain (2001, Lost Highway)
- Mastered by Steve Marcussen at Marcussen Mastering, Los Angeles, California

=== Artwork ===
- Design by Frank Olinsky
- Photography by Mark Seliger

== Charts ==
Chart performance for Time (The Revelator)
Chart (2021)	Peak position
US Billboard 200	157
US Billboard Heatseekers	5
US Billboard Independent Albums	7
US Billboard Top Internet Albums	4
