= Woodland Sound Studios =

Music recording studio in Nashville, Tennessee, US

Coordinates: 36°10′39″N 86°45′02″W

Woodland Studios
- Industry: Recording studio
- Founded: 1967; 58 years ago in Nashville, U.S.
- Founder: Glenn Snoddy
- Headquarters: Nashville, Tennessee, U.S.
- Number of locations: 1

Woodland Studios is a music recording studio located at 1011 Woodland Street in East Nashville, Tennessee, originally founded in 1967. The studios have been the site of numerous notable recordings by artists including Nitty Gritty Dirt Band, Jimmy Buffett, Billy "Crash" Craddock, Kansas, Neil Young, Charlie Daniels Band, Tammy Wynette, George Strait, Indigo Girls, and others.

Since 2001 the studios have been owned by Gillian Welch and David Rawlings.

== History ==
=== 1967 to 1979 ===
Built in a 1920s-era movie theater building located in East Nashville, Woodland was designed and constructed under the supervision of former Bradley and Columbia Studios recording engineer Glenn Snoddy for the parent company of the Crescent-Loew movie theater chain. The facility included a recording studio as well as administrative space for gospel label Nashboro Records and Excellorec Publishing. In 1968 the studio replaced its original Altec mixing console with a new 24-input 16-buss console with quad capabilities, four echo sends, two cue busses, and simultaneous four, two, and mono mixdown facilities, making Woodland one of the most advanced facilities at the time. By 1969 Snoddy was Woodland's president and chief technical officer, with Jim Pugh serving as the studios' chief engineer. That year the original building was expanded to add a second 16-track studio (Studio B), and advertised that it had a Moog synthesizer, as well as a custom lighting system designed to change color and fluctuate with the music in the studio.

The studio hosted recording sessions for Nashboro as well as outside clients, and quickly made a name for itself, hosting sessions for such artists as Linda Ronstadt, Joan Baez, and Gordon Lightfoot. Jack Blanchard & Misty Morgan recorded the duo's most successful single, "Tennessee Bird Walk" at Woodland in 1970, and Billy "Crash" Craddock recorded several albums at the studio, including the album named after his first Top 10 song, "Knock Three Times".

In August 1971, Will the Circle Be Unbroken, the Nitty Gritty Dirt Band's landmark collaboration with an earlier generation of bluegrass and country-and-western players, including Roy Acuff, "Mother" Maybelle Carter, Doc Watson, Earl Scruggs, Randy Scruggs, Merle Travis, Pete "Oswald" Kirby, Norman Blake, Jimmy Martin, Vassar Clements and others, was recorded at Woodland Sound Studios.

Jimmy Buffett realized early career success with two albums recorded at Woodland: Living and Dying in 3/4 Time (1973) and A1A (1974). Ferlin Husky recorded his 1974 album Champagne Ladies and Blue Ribbon Babies at the studio. In 1975, Woodland added a mastering studio designed by Tom Hidley.

In 1976 Woodland upgraded Studio B from 16 to 24 tracks with a new Neve mixing console. The following year, Kansas moved the recording sessions for their album Point of Know Return to Woodland, and recorded their hit "Dust in the Wind" at the studio. That same year, Neil Young recorded portions of his album Comes a Time at Woodland. Barbara Mandrell also recorded portions of her 1977 album Love's Ups and Downs at the studio, the first of many albums she'd record at Woodland into the 1980s.

In December 1978, Woodland's Studio A was upgraded with a Neve 8078 mixing console. Around the same time, when Charlie Daniels and his band were recording Million Mile Reflections at Woodland, he realized the album needed a song that featured fiddle, and he wrote "The Devil Went Down to Georgia" at the studio, with the song becoming the band's biggest hit.

Other artists recording at Woodland in the 1970s included Roy Clark, Freddy Weller, Hank Thompson, Carol Channing, Mary Costa, and the Bobby "Blue" Bland.

=== 1980 to 2000 ===
Snoddy sold the studios to AVI in 1980 but continued to work at Woodland for the next 10 years. The Oak Ridge Boys recorded their 1981 album Fancy Free at the studio, including its hit single "Elvira", and Tammy Wynette utilized Woodland's facilities to record Soft Touch the following year. George Strait recorded Right or Wrong, including the singer's third number-one song, "You Look So Good in Love", at Woodland.

Other artists recording at Woodland in the 1980s included Christy Lane, Donna Fargo, John Conlee, Conway Twitty, Eddie Rabbitt, Roy Head, Rosanne Cash, Amy Grant, J. J. Cale, Earl Thomas Conley, and Clint Black.

In 1991, Robert Solomon, who had gotten his start at Woodland as an engineer in the 1970s, took over running the studio.

Other artists who recorded at Woodland in the 1990s included the Indigo Girls, Aaron Tippin, and the Fixx, whose 1999 album title 1011 Woodland referenced the studios' street address.

On April 16, 1998, the studio was seriously damaged by a mile-wide tornado, which led to the studio falling into disrepair and contentious litigation between Solomon and the building's owners. As of December 2000, Solomon was no longer running the studio, which sat vacant and was condemned.

=== 2001 to present ===
In 2001, Gillian Welch and David Rawlings purchased the studio. Both had recorded at Woodland in the mid-90s for Welch's album Revival, as well as during the recording of Ryan Adams' album Heartbreaker, and wanted to preserve the studios' more than 30-year history.

In 2010 Robert Plant and Band of Joy recorded their Band of Joy In 2011, Gillian Welch's The Harrow & the Harvest was recorded at the studio.

In March 2020, the studio sustained damage from yet another tornado, which tore the roof off the studio. Welch and Rawlings rebuilt the studio over the next four years. Their 2024 album Woodland was both recorded at, and is named after the studio.
