= David Rawlings =

American singer-songwriter (born 1969)

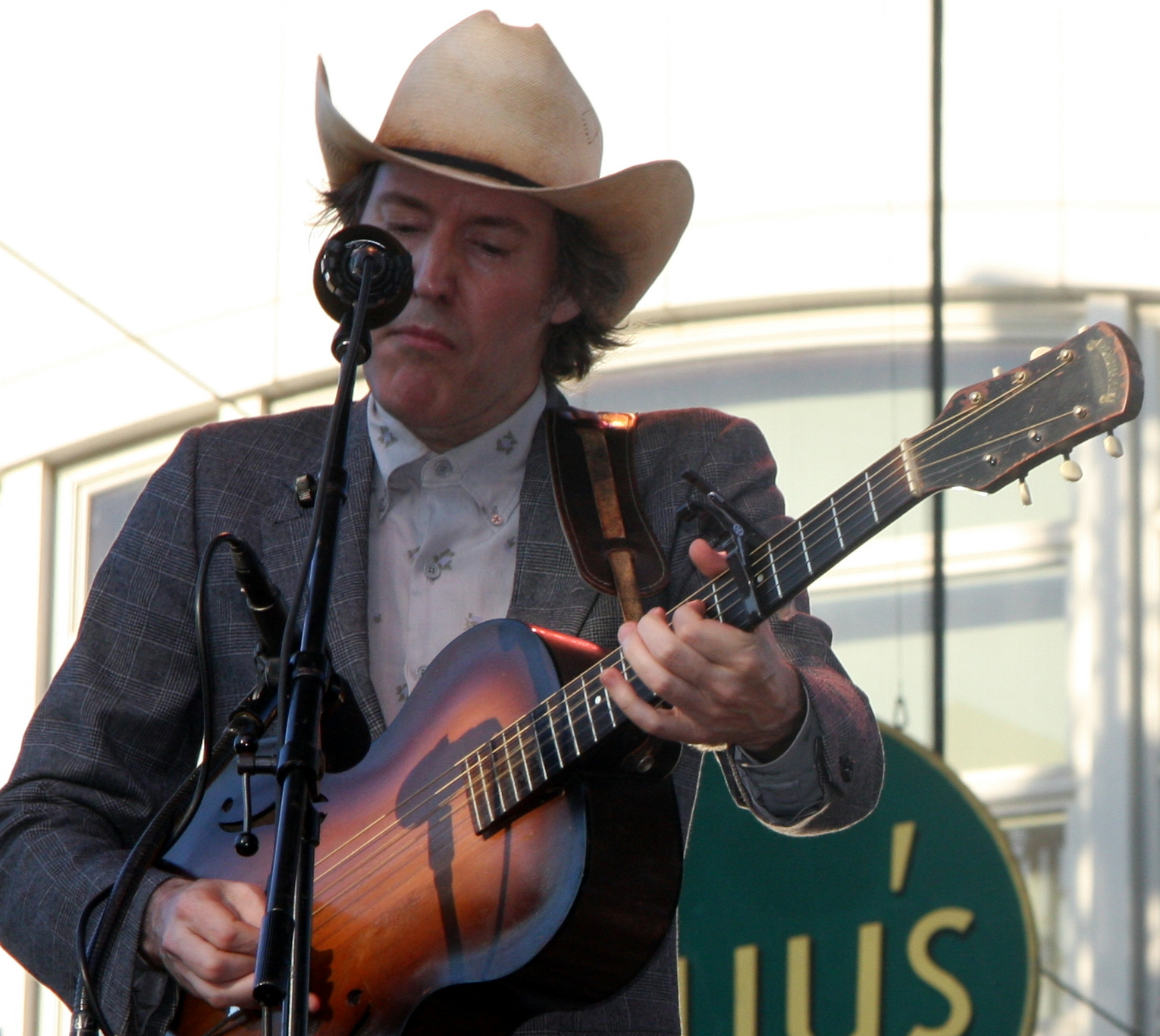
- David Rawlings performing in 2014

Background information
- Born: December 30, 1969 (age 56); North Smithfield, Rhode Island, U.S.
- Occupations: Musician; singer; record producer
- Instruments: Vocals, guitar
- Website: www.daverawlingsmachine.com

David Todd Rawlings (born December 30, 1969) is an American guitarist, singer, and record producer. He is known for his musical partnership with singer and songwriter Gillian Welch. He and Welch were nominated for the Academy Award for Best Original Song at the 91st Academy Awards for "When a Cowboy Trades His Spurs for Wings" from The Ballad of Buster Scruggs. In 2020, Welch and Rawlings released All the Good Times (Are Past & Gone), which won the 2021 Grammy Award for Best Folk Album. In 2024, Welch and Rawlings released Woodland, which won the 2025 Grammy Award for Best Folk Album, currently making Welch and Rawlings the only duo to win the award more than once.

== Life and career ==
Rawlings attended the Berklee College of Music and studied with Lauren Passarelli. He produced albums by Gillian Welch, Willie Watson, Dawes, and Old Crow Medicine Show. In the mid-2010s he led a band called the Dave Rawlings Machine, composed of Rawlings, Gillian Welch, Willie Watson, Paul Kowert, and Brittany Haas. John Paul Jones of Led Zeppelin has been known to play mandolin with the band occasionally. Rawlings contributed to the albums Cassadaga by Bright Eyes, Spooked by Robyn Hitchcock, and Heartbreaker by Ryan Adams, with whom he wrote two songs, "To Be Young (Is to Be Sad, Is to Be High)" and "Touch, Feel and Lose". His vocal style has often been compared to that of Bob Dylan.

== Recordings ==
=== A Friend of a Friend (2009) ===
The Dave Rawlings Machine album A Friend of a Friend was released on November 17, 2009. Rawlings recorded the album in Nashville, and produced it himself. Gillian Welch is credited as a co-writer on five of the album's songs as well playing in the band with members of Tom Petty and the Heartbreakers, Old Crow Medicine Show, and Bright Eyes. The album features a medley of a Neil Young and Bright Eyes song, as well as songs Rawlings co-wrote with Ryan Adams and Old Crow Medicine Show. Morgan Nagler (of the band Whispertown) is credited with co-writing the song "Sweet Tooth".

=== Nashville Obsolete (2015) ===
In 2015 Dave Rawlings Machine released a second album, Nashville Obsolete. The album was named to Rolling Stone's list of the top 40 country albums of 2016. In late 2016 Acony issued Boots No 1: The Official Revival Bootleg, a deluxe version of the 1996 Welch album considered a "modern Americana classic" and the first collaboration for the duo.

=== Poor David's Almanack (2017) ===
Poor David's Almanack, released on August 11, 2017, via Acony Records, is the eighth collaborative LP for Rawlings and Welch and the first under the name David Rawlings. In addition to Welch and Watson, the backup band includes Brittany Haas, Paul Kowert, Ketch Secor of Old Crow Medicine Show, and Taylor and Griffin Goldsmith of Dawes. The album was recorded with Ken Scott and Matt Andrews at the Rawlings/Welch duo's Woodland Sound Studios in Nashville. The album features an original woodcut piece by Gillian Welch on the cover and was notably the first vinyl release on Welch and Rawlings' Acony record label.

Start to finish, the album is a testament both to his immeasurable talent and to his essential place in the roots and Americana music scene. It's also a chance for a guy otherwise happy to play sideman or stand behind the boards to step out just a touch further into a well-deserved spotlight.

— Brittney McKenna, Rolling Stone

"Cumberland Gap" was used as the opening song to Guy Ritchie's 2019 film, The Gentlemen. It was nominated for Best American Roots Song at the 2018 Grammy Awards.

=== All the Good Times (Are Past and Gone) (2020) ===
In July 2020, Rawlings and Welch announced All the Good Times (Are Past & Gone), an album of covers and traditional songs recorded at their home during the COVID-19 lockdowns of 2020. All the Good Times is notably the first album in their decades-long history of collaboration to be released jointly in both of their names. The album won the 2021 Grammy Award for Best Folk Album.

== Instrument ==
Rawlings achieves his signature guitar sound flatpicking a small archtop guitar. The 1935 Epiphone Olympic that has been his primary instrument was a mid-priced guitar for its time, with a carved arched solid sprucewood top, carved arched solid mahogany back and mahogany sides. It sold for about $35 in 1935 (equivalent to $820 in 2025). The guitar's lower bout measures 13 5/8 inches wide, and it has three piece f-holes.

Rawlings "scavenged" the guitar from a friend's garage and is now hardly seen playing anything else. As he states, "I just picked it up. It was filthy, and it didn't have strings. You could just see the shape of it under the sawdust." Rawlings had a new one piece bridge made for it and brought it to a recording session for Welch's first record. "As soon as I heard it through the microphone and through the speakers I was like, 'I love this guitar'." he says.

== Discography ==
=== Dave Rawlings Machine ===
- A Friend of a Friend (Acony, 2009)
- Nashville Obsolete (Acony, 2015)

=== David Rawlings ===
- Poor David's Almanack (Acony, 2017)

=== Gillian Welch & David Rawlings ===
- All the Good Times (Are Past & Gone) (Acony, 2020)
- Woodland (Acony, 2024)

=== Gillian Welch ===
- Revival (Almo Sounds, 1996)
- Hell Among the Yearlings (Acony, 1998)
- Time (The Revelator) (Acony, 2001)
- Soul Journey (Acony, 2003)
- The Harrow & The Harvest (Acony, 2011)
- Boots No. 1: The Official Revival Bootleg (Acony, 2016)
- Boots No. 2: The Lost Songs (Acony, 2020)

=== As guest ===
With Ryan Adams

- Heartbreaker (2000)
- Demolition (2002)

With Bright Eyes

- Four Winds (Saddle Creek, 2007)
- Cassadaga (Saddle Creek, 2007)

With others

- Ani DiFranco, Swing Set (2000)
- Old Crow Medicine Show, Old Crow Medicine Show (2004)
- Robyn Hitchcock, Spooked (2004)
- The Whispertown 2000, Swim (Acony, 2008)
- Sara Watkins, Sara Watkins (Nonesuch, 2009)
