= The Harrow & the Harvest =

2011 album by Gilliam Welch

Studio album by Gillian Welch
- Released: June 28, 2011
- Recorded: February 2011
- Studios: Woodland (Nashville, Tennessee)
- Genre: Folk
- Label: Acony
- Producer: David Rawlings

Gillian Welch chronology
Soul Journey (2003)	The Harrow & the Harvest (2011)	All the Good Times (Are Past & Gone) (2020)

The Harrow & the Harvest is the fifth studio album by American singer-songwriter Gillian Welch. Released on 28 June 2011, it was Welch's first album in eight years. The album was nominated for Best Folk Album for the 54th Grammy Awards.

== Background ==
The eight years since the release of 2003's Soul Journey marked the longest period of time between album releases for Welch. In explaining the relatively long recording absence, Welch said, "The sad truth is we never liked anything enough to put it out, which is not a pleasant place to be." She added, "over the course of that time that we were quiet we probably had enough songs to put out two or three records. Actually we made a few tentative steps at trying to record, but inevitably the heart would go out of it when we realised that we simply didn't like the material enough to go on with it." Welch frequently performed the song "The Way It Will Be" in years prior to the release of the album. Welch explains that this tense time period inspired the album title: "Our songcraft slipped and I really don't know why. It's not uncommon. It's something that happens to writers. It's the deepest frustration we have come through, hence the album title." The writing process involved "this endless back and forth between the two of us," Welch said, stating that "It’s our most intertwined, co-authored, jointly-composed album." John Dyer Baizley provided artwork for the album.

== Recording ==
According to Welch, "The songs are mostly first and second takes, and Dave composed some of the music spontaneously in the studio. It was very freeing. We learned to accept mistakes and rough edges, because those didn't impede what the heart of the matter was."

== Reception ==
Professional ratings
Aggregate scores
Source	Rating
AnyDecentMusic?	8.5/10
Metacritic	85/100
Review scores
Source	Rating
AllMusic	5/5 stars
The A.V. Club	C+
The Daily Telegraph	5/5 stars
The Guardian	4/5 stars
The Independent	5/5 stars
Los Angeles Times	3.5/4 stars
Mojo	5/5 stars
The Observer	5/5 stars
Rolling Stone	3.5/5 stars
Uncut	4/5 stars

The Harrow & the Harvest was met with "universal acclaim" reviews from critics. At Metacritic, which assigns a weighted average rating out of 100 to reviews from mainstream publications, this release received an average score of 85 based on 28 reviews. Aggregate website AnyDecentMusic? gave the release an 8.5 out of 10 based on a critical consensus of 27 reviews.

Uncut placed it at 2 on their "Top 50 albums of 2011" list, while Q, Mojo, and Paste placed it at number 28, 34, and 39, respectively.

== Track listing ==
All tracks are written by Gillian Welch and David Rawlings.

The Harrow & the Harvest track listing
No.	Title	Length
1.	"Scarlet Town"	3:38
2.	"Dark Turn of Mind"	4:07
3.	"The Way It Will Be"	4:47
4.	"The Way It Goes"	4:01
5.	"Tennessee"	6:35
6.	"Down Along the Dixie Line"	4:49
7.	"Six White Horses"	3:38
8.	"Hard Times"	4:52
9.	"Silver Dagger"	3:23
10.	"The Way the Whole Thing Ends"	6:11

== Charts ==
=== Weekly charts ===
Weekly chart performance for The Harrow & the Harvest
Chart (2011)	Peak position
Australian Albums (ARIA)	11
Belgian Albums (Ultratop Flanders)	75
Dutch Albums (Album Top 100)	25
Irish Albums (IRMA)	22
New Zealand Albums (RMNZ)	14
Norwegian Albums (VG-lista)	7
Scottish Albums (Official Charts)	14
Swedish Albums (Sverigetopplistan)	31
UK Albums (Official Charts)	25
US Billboard 200	20
US Americana/Folk Albums (Billboard)	1
US Independent Albums (Billboard)	3
US Top Rock Albums (Billboard)	5

=== Year-end charts ===
Year-end chart performance for The Harrow & the Harvest
Chart (2011)	Position
US Top Rock Albums (Billboard)	68
