= Mark Seliger =

American photographer

Mark Alan Seliger (born May 23, 1959) is an American photographer noted for his portraiture. From 1992 to 2002, he was Chief Photographer for Rolling Stone, during which time he shot over 188 covers for the magazine. From 2002 to 2012 he was under contract with Condé Nast Publications for GQ and Vanity Fair and has shot for numerous other magazines. Seliger has published a number of books, including When They Came to Take My Father: Voices of the Holocaust, Physiognomy, and On Christopher Street: Transgender Stories, and his photographs are included in the permanent collections of the National Portrait Gallery at the Smithsonian Institution, the Museum of Fine Arts in Houston, and the National Portrait Gallery in London. He has done advertising work for Adidas, Amazon, Anheuser-Busch, Apple, Dom Pérignon, Fila, Gap, HBO, Hourglass Cosmetics, Hulu, KITH, Lee Jeans, Levi's, McDonald's, Netflix, Ralph Lauren, Ray-Ban, Rolex, Showtime, Sony, Universal and Viacom, among others. He is also the lead singer of the country band Rusty Truck.

== Early life and education ==
Seliger was born in 1959 in Amarillo, Texas, the son of Carol Lee and Maurice, a traveling pipe salesman. The family moved to Houston in 1964. Seliger's first camera was a Diana given to him by his brother Frank and at 13 he took an introductory darkroom class at a Jewish Community Center. Seliger attended the High School for the Performing and Visual Arts in Houston. During and after his senior year he did printing work for local photographer Fred Damon. He attended East Texas State University (now Texas A&M University Commerce), where he studied under James Newberry with an emphasis in Documentary and Rob Lawton in Design. Seliger cites Arnold Newman as one of the first photographers he connected with, particularly his portrait of Igor Stravinsky emulating the pose of a piano.

== Career ==
Seliger moved to New York City in 1984. At first he would cold call photographers from a pay phone until one of them agreed to let him assist. Over time he learned from the assortment of photographers he worked with. Eventually he took on a long-term position assisting John Madere, a corporate and editorial photographer. After assisting Madere for a year and a half, Seliger went out on his own. The first magazine to hire him was Esquire where he shot journalist Bryant Gumbel wearing a cubs hat, an assignment that led to more work with other business magazines. Seliger began working for Rolling Stone in 1987, first hired by Laurie Kratochvil, the magazine's director of photography at the time. One of his first assignments for the magazine was photographing a young LL Cool J at his grandmother's home in Hollis, Queens. Beginning in 1992, Seliger became Rolling Stone's Chief Photographer. Over the next decade he shot 188 covers for the magazine.

In 1996, Seliger published his first book, When They Came to Take My Father: Voices of the Holocaust. He later described the book, which covers subject matter that was personal and unedited, as one of the high points in his career.

During his time at Rolling Stone, Seliger began a long-term collaborative relationship with design director, Fred Woodward. They co-directed music videos for Hole "Violet" (1994), Joan Osborne "One of Us" (1996), Shawn Colvin "Sunny Came Home" (1997), Paula Cole "I Don't Want to Wait" (1997), Natalie Merchant "Ophelia" and "Kind and Generous"(both 1998), Lenny Kravitz "I Belong to You"and Shinehead "Jamaican in New York" and commercials for The Gap starring artists such as Missy Elliott, Aerosmith and LL Cool J. Seliger's other music videos include "She" by Elvis Costello, "Stillness of Heart" and "I Belong to You" by Lenny Kravitz, "Kind and Generous" by Natalie Merchant, "Maria" by Willie Nelson, "Revelator" by Gillian Welch and "Wake Me Up" by Avicii co-directed by Barney Miller.

In 2002, Seliger moved from Rolling Stone to Conde Nast Publications, initially under contract for GQ and Vanity Fair. Other magazines he has photographed for include British Vogue, Citizen K, Details, Elle, Esquire, Harper's Bazaar, German Vogue, Hero, Heroine, Interview, Vogue Italia, L'Uomo Vogue, The New York Times Magazine, Purple, Time, Vogue China, Vogue Hommes, Vogue Russia, Vogue Spain, and W.

In 2005, Seliger published In My Stairwell which features artists photographed in the elevator shaft-turned-stairwell of his loft studio. In 2006, Seliger opened 401 Projects, a photography gallery and community space next to his studio in the West Village.

Since 2014, Seliger has been photographing actors and directors at the Vanity Fair Oscars Party following the Academy Awards. Each year he and set designer Thomas Thurnauer design a 15’ x 30" portable studio for the event. On the night of the party about 100 actors will sit for their portrait.

In 2016, Seliger published On Christopher Street: Transgender Stories, which includes over 70 portraits of transgender people. Seliger began documenting his West Village neighborhood which had been rapidly gentrifying and the project evolved to tell a story about the transgender community. Photographs from the collection were featured in a 2021-2022 exhibition at the Memphis Brooks Museum of Art. The museum's curator wrote of the photographs: "These portraits remind us that Christopher Street is more than just a physical place – it is a feeling, an idea, that redefines notions of home and community."

In 2019, Seliger was named an American Portrait Gallery honoree by the National Portrait Gallery, which acquired the photographer's portrait of Lin-Manuel Miranda dressed as the character Hamilton from his hit musical by the same name.

In 2020, Seliger auctioned off 26 photographs to benefit COVID-19 relief efforts. The photographs included portraits of Tom Hanks, Jennifer Lopez, Brad Pitt, Barack Obama, Willie Nelson and Bruce Springsteen, among others, and raised a total of $232,375 for a number of charities chosen by each of the featured celebrities.

In 2021, Seliger published The City that Finally Sleeps, which documents the empty streets of New York City during March 2020 at the height of the pandemic. Seliger has described the project as "a celebration of resilience and hope."

Seliger has said that a great portrait comes from composition, the emotional response and the storytelling. Some of the notable people Seliger has photographed over the years include: Jennifer Aniston, David Beckham, Justin Bieber, Tony Bennett, David Bowie, Tom Brady, Matthew Broderick, David Byrne, Kobe Bryant, Jimmy Carter, Johnny Cash, Bill Clinton, Hillary Clinton, Kurt Cobain, Johnny Depp, Leonardo DiCaprio, Dalai Lama, Snoop Dogg, Dr. Dre, Eminem, Lady Gaga, George Harrison, Jerry Garcia, Kendrick Lamar, Gisele Bündchen, Jay-Z, Lenny Kravitz, Paul McCartney, Nelson Mandela, Eddie Murphy, Willie Nelson, Paul Newman, Barack Obama, Al Pacino, Sarah Jessica Parker, Brad Pitt, Sean Penn, Iggy Pop, Aly Raisman, Red Hot Chili Peppers, Robert Redford, Julia Roberts, The Rolling Stones, Susan Sarandon, Martin Scorsese, Jerry Seinfeld, Cindy Sherman, Patti Smith, Bruce Springsteen, Barbra Streisand, Uma Thurman, Desmond Tutu, U2, Neil Young, Serena and Venus Williams, and Malala Yousafzai, among others.

== Notable photographs ==
- Nirvana on a 1992 cover of Rolling Stone magazine with Kurt Cobain wearing a t-shirt with the slogan: "Corporate Magazines Still Suck."
- Kurt Cobain framed by dolls heads and wilted roses. The photograph accompanied a Rolling Stone article about the making of In Utero and was shot in October 1993, 6 months prior to the musician's death. Speaking of the photograph, Seliger said, "I don’t think this image needs to be seen with a sense of foreboding. If anything, there’s something life-affirming about where he’s at, even if the framing is grotesque. It’s overwhelmingly about the beauty of him as a man."
- Dr. Dre and Snoop Dogg in 1993, seated on the rear of a Cadillac in Compton, California.
- Tom Hanks in 1994, with his face framed by the hands of a chimpanzee.
- Jerry Seinfeld as the Tin Man from The Wizard of Oz. The 1998 photograph was part of a series with the cast of Seinfeld depicted as the characters from the classic movie.
- Jennifer Lopez in 2001, posing with two live leopards in a jungle scene inspired by the work of fantasy and sci-fi illustrator Frank Frazetta.
- Vaudeville-style performer Bill Irwin as a clown in an elevator shaft. Seliger included the 2002 photograph in his book In My Stairwell and described it as "One of my favorite images of all time that I took."
- President Barack Obama in a diptych from 2009 that includes a face-forward image of the president used on the cover of Rolling Stone and a silhouette of the back of his head and shoulders. With only 6 minutes to photograph the president, Seliger first captured the forward-facing cover image. He then asked the president if he would pose for photographs from the side and behind. As Seliger photographed his back, the president joked, "Is this going to make my ears look big?" After a few more shots he said, "Okay Mark, that’s enough art," and walked off.
- Artist Cindy Sherman in 2009 for fashion magazine L'Uomo Vogue, photographed with a prosthetic breastplate.
- The Dalai Lama in 2011. Seliger asked the Dalai Lama if he would remove his glasses and watch despite having been asked by the Lama's accompany monks not to make the request. The Lama agreed and removed them for the shoot. Seliger has said " He was wearing this 13th-century Malas, passed on to him, and I just loved seeing his eyes and the blackness of the beads and how there was a real quality of depth and spirituality to it, and less about modern jewelry and glasses."
- Brad Pitt in 2014 riding a motorcycle among redwoods along the Avenue of Giants for Details magazine.
- Lin-Manuel Miranda in 2016 as Alexander Hamilton; later acquired by the Smithsonian's National Portrait Gallery.

== Music ==
Since 2000, Seliger has been the lead singer of country music band Rusty Truck. His bandmates include Grant Lee Buffalo drummer Joey Peters and Chalk FarM guitarist Michael Duff. Seliger began writing songs in the late 1990s to fend off artistic angst toward the end of his tenure with Rolling Stone. Rusty Truck formed in 2000 and began performing regularly at the Mint Club in Los Angeles. In 2003, the band released the album "Luck's Changing Lanes." The album's producers include Lenny Kravitz, Gillian Welch, Bob Dylan, Willie Nelson, Dave Rawlings, Sheryl Crow and T Bone Burnett. In 2013, Rusty Truck released their second album "Kicker Town." Vocalist Kristin Mooney and songwriter Mike Viola joined the band on the album, which was produced by Andres Levin. In February 2023, Rusty Truck released its self-titled album. The album was produced by Larry Campbell and features appearances from Sheryl Crow and Jakob Dylan. The video for the album's first single "Ain't Over Me" was directed by Seliger and features Katie Holmes and Benjamin Freemantle.

== Personal life ==
Since 1996, Seliger has lived and worked at a three-story converted warehouse at the corner of Charles and West Streets in the West Village. The 19th-century building was originally built as a horse stable for a correctional facility. After Seliger purchased the property in 1996, architect Peter Mimmelstein converted the 10,000-square-foot building into a studio, offices and Seliger's home. The building's giant elevator shaft-turned-stairwell was the setting for the portraits included in his 2005 book, Mark Seliger: In My Stairwell.

In 2004, Seliger bought the Richard Neutra-designed Alpha Wirin House in Los Feliz and had designer Mark Haddawy restore the 1949 example of Neutra's Mid-century modern work to maintain its architectural integrity. He sold the house in 2015.

== Bibliography ==
- The City that Finally Sleeps (2021)
- On Christopher Street: Transgender Stories, Rizzoli (2016) ISBN 978-0-8478-5831-6
- Listen Rizzoli (2010) ISBN 978-0-8478-3464-8
- In My Stairwell Rizzoli (2005) ISBN 978-0-8478-2760-2
- Lenny Kravitz by Seliger and Lenny Kravitz, Arena (2001) ISBN 978-1-892041-50-0
- Physiognomy: The Mark Seliger Photographs, Bulfinch (1999) ISBN 978-0-8212-2598-1
- When They Came to Take My Father- voices of the Holocaust Arcade Publishing, (1996) ISBN 978-1-55970-305-5
- Rolling Stone the Complete Covers 1967-1997

== Awards ==
- 1999 Columbia University School of Journalism's Alfred Eisenstaedt Award for his portrait of Ben Stiller for Rolling Stone
- 2009 Lucie Award for Achievement in Portraiture
- 2013 Clio Grand Prize for the photograph "1942 Lovers" for the Ray-Ban 75 Years of Legend campaign
- 2019 Texas Medal of Arts award presented by the Texas Cultural Trust
