= Gillian Welch =

American musician (born 1967)

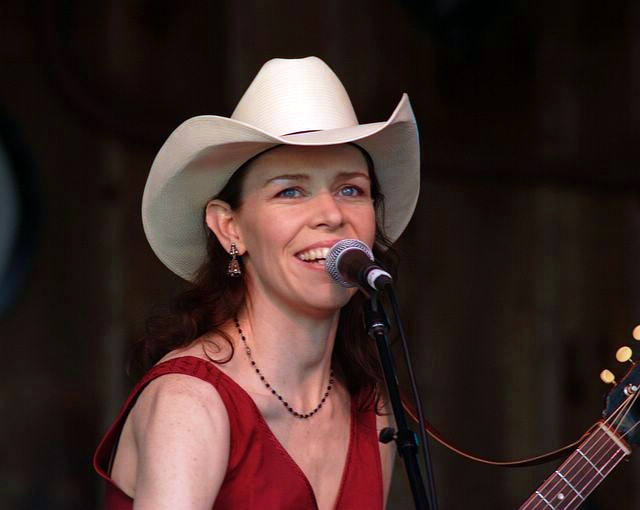
- Welch performing at MerleFest in 2006

Background information
- Born: Gillian Howard Welch; October 2, 1967 (age 59); New York City, U.S.
- Origin: Nashville, Tennessee
- Genres: Country; bluegrass; folk; Americana
- Occupation: Singer-songwriter
- Instruments: Vocals; acoustic guitar; banjo; drums; harmonica
- Years active: 1996–present
- Labels: Acony; Almo Sounds
- Website: gillianwelch.com

Gillian Howard Welch (born October 2, 1967) is an American singer-songwriter who performs with guitarist David Rawlings. Their spare, often dark sound, which The New Yorker calls "at once innovative and obliquely reminiscent of past rural forms", blends Appalachian, bluegrass, country and Americana.

Welch and Rawlings have collaborated on nine critically acclaimed albums, five under her name, three under Rawlings', and two jointly. Her debut Revival (1996) was nominated for Grammy Award for Best Contemporary Folk Album, as was Time (The Revelator), from 2001. Soul Journey (2003) introduced a fuller, more upbeat sound, with drums and electric guitar. After an eight-year gap, The Harrow & the Harvest (2011) was also nominated for a Best Contemporary Folk Album Grammy.

In 2020, Welch and Rawlings released All the Good Times (Are Past & Gone), which won the 2021 Grammy Award for Best Folk Album. In 2024, Welch and Rawlings released Woodland, which would win the 2025 Grammy Award for Best Folk Album, currently making Welch and Rawlings the only duo to win the award more than once.

Welch was an associate producer and performed on two songs of the soundtrack of the Coen brothers 2000 film O Brother, Where Art Thou?, a platinum album that won the Grammy Award for Album of the Year in 2002. She also appeared in the film attempting to buy a Soggy Bottom Boys record. Welch, while not one of the principal actors, did sing and provide additional lyrics to the Sirens song "Didn't Leave Nobody but the Baby." In 2018 she and Rawlings wrote the song "When a Cowboy Trades His Spurs for Wings" for the Coens' The Ballad of Buster Scruggs, for which they received a nomination for the Academy Award for Best Original Song.

== Early life ==
Welch was born on October 2, 1967, in New York City, and was adopted by Mitzie Welch (née Marilyn Cottle) and Ken Welch, comedy and music entertainers. Her biological mother was a freshman in college, and her father was a musician visiting New York City. Welch has speculated that her biological father could have been one of her favorite musicians, and she later discovered from her adoptive parents that he was a drummer. Alec Wilkinson of The New Yorker stated that "from an address they had been given, it appeared that her mother ... may have grown up in the mountains of North Carolina". When Welch was three, her adoptive parents moved to Los Angeles to write music for The Carol Burnett Show. They also appeared on The Tonight Show.

"Orphan Girl"
The first track on Gillian Welch's first album Revival. This song exemplifies Welch and Rawlings' minimal arrangements and Welch's lyrics about outcasts

As a child, Welch was introduced to the music of American folk singers Bob Dylan, Woody Guthrie, and the Carter Family. She performed folk songs with her peers at the Westland Elementary School in Los Angeles. Welch later attended Crossroads School, a high school in Santa Monica, California. While in high school, a local television program featured her as a student who "excelled at everything she did."

While a student at the University of California, Santa Cruz, Welch played bass in a goth band, and drums in a psychedelic surf band. In college, a roommate played an album by the bluegrass band the Stanley Brothers, and she had an epiphany:

The first song came on and I just stood up and I kind of walked into the other room as if I was in a tractor beam and stood there in front of the stereo. It was just as powerful as the electric stuff, and it was songs I'd grown up singing. All of a sudden I'd found my music.

After graduating from UC Santa Cruz with a degree in photography, Welch attended the Berklee College of Music in Boston, where she majored in songwriting. During her two years studying at Berklee, Welch gained confidence as a performer. Welch met her music partner David Rawlings at a successful audition for Berklee's only country band.

== Career ==
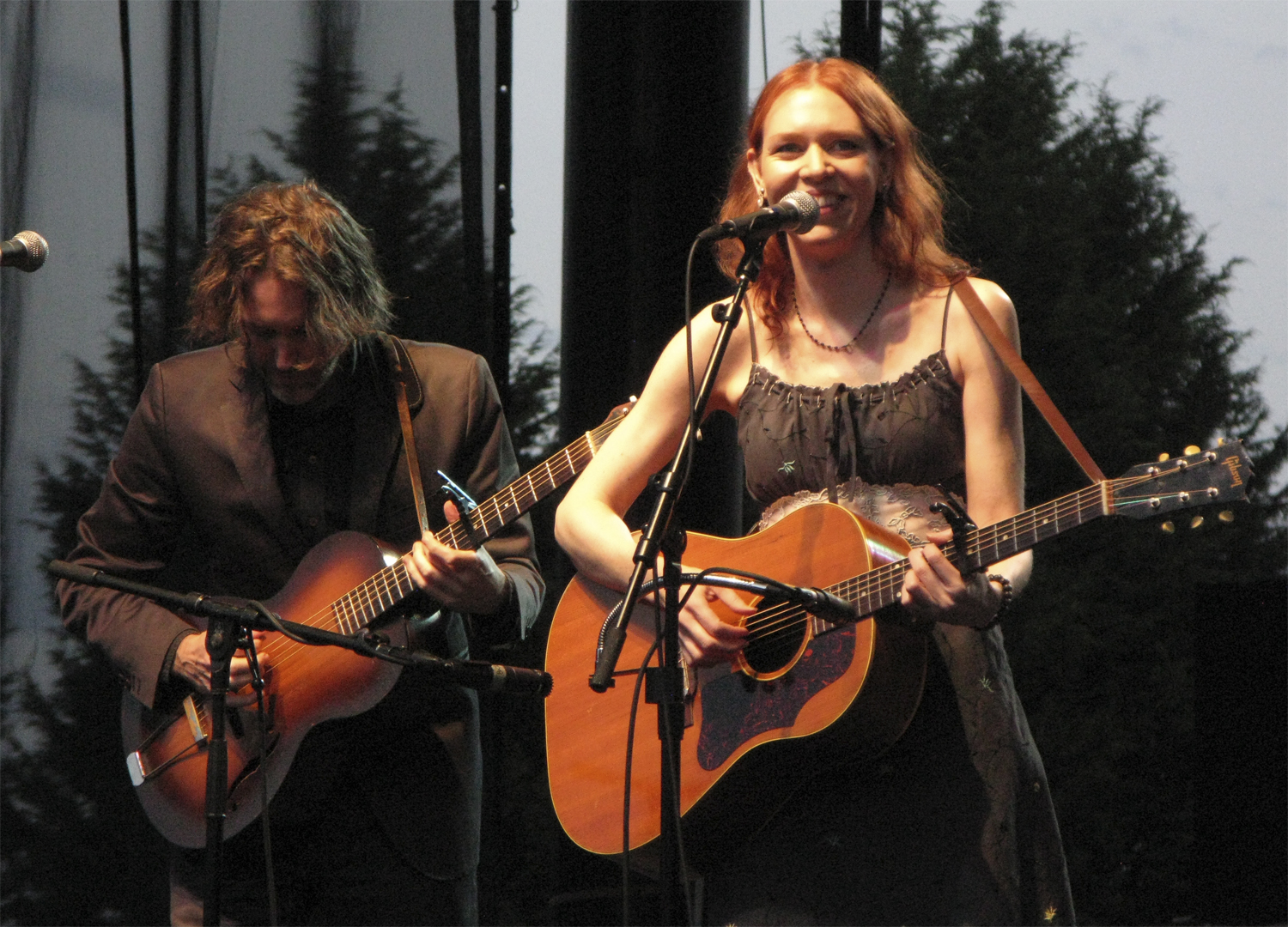
Rawlings and Welch performing in Seattle in 2009

Upon finishing college in 1992, Welch moved to Nashville, Tennessee. She recalled, "I looked at my record collection and saw that all the music I loved had been made in Nashville—Bill Monroe, Dylan, the Stanley Brothers, Neil Young—so I moved there. Not ever thinking I was thirty years too late." Rawlings soon followed. In Nashville, after singing "Long Black Veil," the two first realized that their voices harmonized well and they started to perform as a duo. They never considered using a working name, so the duo were simply billed as "Gillian Welch." A year after moving to Nashville, Welch found a manager, Denise Stiff, who already managed Alison Krauss. Both Welch and Stiff ignored frequent advice that Welch should stop playing with Rawlings and join a band. They eventually signed a recording contract with Almo Sounds. Following a performance opening for Peter Rowan at the Station Inn, producer T Bone Burnett expressed interest in recording an album. Burnett did not plan to disturb Welch's and Rawlings' preference for minimal instrumentation, and Welch agreed to take him on as a producer.

Welch gave a homemade copy of her demos to Tim O'Brien who then recorded two of Welch's songs with his sister Mollie O'Brien. "Orphan Girl" and "Wichita" are featured on Tim and Mollie's album Away out on the Mountain (1994), standing as the first published songs of Welch's.

=== Revival ===
For the recording sessions of Welch's debut, Revival, Burnett wanted to recapture the bare sound of Welch's live performance. Welch recalled, "That first week was really intense. It was just T Bone, the engineer, and Dave and myself. We got so inside our little world. There was very little distance between our singing and playing. The sound was very immediate. It was so light and small." Later, they recorded several more songs and played with an expanded group of musicians: guitarist and Rock and Roll Hall of Fame inductee James Burton, bassist Roy Huskey, Jr., and veteran session drummers Jim Keltner and Buddy Harman.

The album was released in April 1996 to mostly positive reviews. Mark Deming of AllMusic called it a "superb debut" and wrote, "Welch's debts to artists of the past are obvious and clearly acknowledged, but there's a maturity, intelligence, and keen eye for detail in her songs you wouldn't expect from someone simply trying to ape the Carter Family." Bill Friskics-Warren of No Depression praised the album as "breathtakingly austere evocations of rural culture." The Arlington Heights, Illinois Daily Herald's Mark Guarino observed that Revival was "cheered and scrutinized as a staunch revivalist of Depression-era music only because her originals sounded so much like that era." He attributed this to the biblical imagery of the lyrics, Burnett's threadbare production, and the plainly-sung bleakness in Welch's vocals. Ann Powers of Rolling Stone gave Revival a lukewarm review and criticized Welch for not singing of her own experiences, and "manufacturing emotion." Robert Christgau echoed Powers: Welch "just doesn't have the voice, eye, or way with words to bring her simulation off."

The song, "Orphan Girl," from Revival has been covered by Emmylou Harris, Ann Wilson, Karin Bergquist of Over the Rhine, Mindy Smith, Patty Griffin, Linda Ronstadt, Tim & Mollie O'Brien, Holly Williams and Crooked Still.

Revival was nominated for the 1997 Grammy Award for Best Contemporary Folk Album, but lost to Bruce Springsteen's The Ghost of Tom Joad.

=== Hell Among the Yearlings ===
The duo's 1998 Hell Among the Yearlings continued the rustic and dark themes; the songs' subject matter varies from a female character killing a rapist, a mining accident, a murder ballad, and an ode to morphine before death. Like Revival, Hell Among the Yearlings featured a sparse style that focused on Rawlings and Welch's voices and guitars.

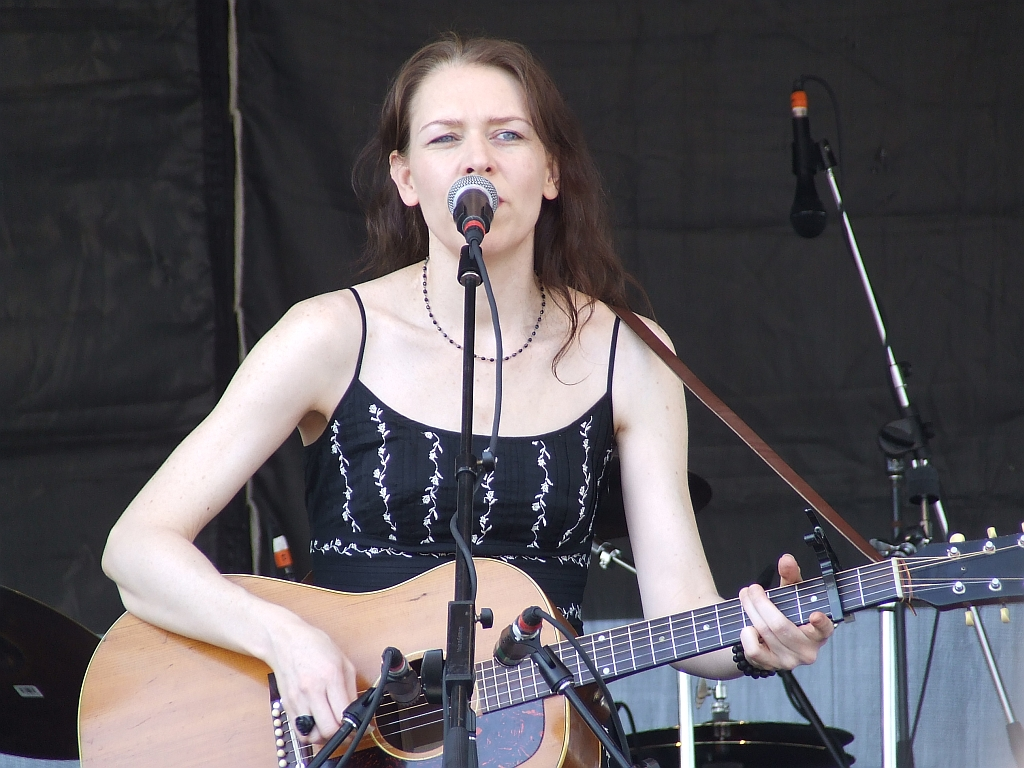
Welch performing at the 2007 New Orleans Jazz Fest

The album also received favorable reviews. Robert Wilonsky of the Dallas Observer observed that Welch "inhabits a role so completely, the fiction separating character and audience disappears". Thom Owens of AllMusic stated that the album "lacks some of the focus" of Revival, but is "a thoroughly satisfying second album" and proof that her debut was not a fluke. No Depression's Farnum Brown commended the live and "immediate feel" of the album, Welch's clawhammer banjo, and Rawlings' harmonies. Similar to Revival, Welch was praised for reflecting influences such as the Stanley Brothers, but still managing to create an original sound, while Chris Herrington from Minneapolis's City Pages criticized the songs' lack of authenticity. He wrote "Welch doesn't write folk songs; she writes folk songs about writing folk songs."

=== O Brother, Where Art Thou? ===
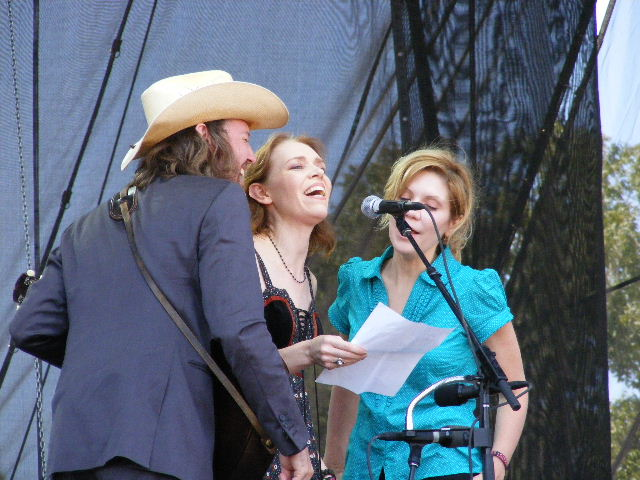
David Rawlings, Welch and Alison Krauss performing at the 2008 Austin City Limits Music Festival

Welch sang two songs and served as the associate producer for the Burnett-produced soundtrack to the 2000 film of the same name. She shared vocals with Alison Krauss on a rendition of the gospel song "I'll Fly Away." Dave McKenna of The Washington Post praised their version: the singers "soar together." Burnett and Welch wrote additional lyrics for the song "Didn't Leave Nobody but the Baby," sung by Welch, Emmylou Harris, and Krauss. The song is an elaboration of an old Mississippi tune discovered by Alan Lomax, and was nominated for the 2002 Grammy Award for Best Country Collaboration with Vocals. The platinum album won the 2002 Grammy Award for Album of the Year. The surprise success of the soundtrack gave Welch a career boost. Welch also made a cameo appearance in the film.

=== Time (The Revelator) ===
When Universal Music Group purchased Almo Sounds, Welch began her own independent label, Acony Records (named for the Appalachian wildflower, Acony Bell, subject of the song of that name on Revival). Rawlings produced the first release on Welch's new label, the 2001 album Time (The Revelator). All but one song on the album was recorded in the historic RCA Studio B in Nashville. "I Want To Sing That Rock and Roll" was recorded live at the Ryman Auditorium in the recording sessions for the concert film Down from the Mountain.

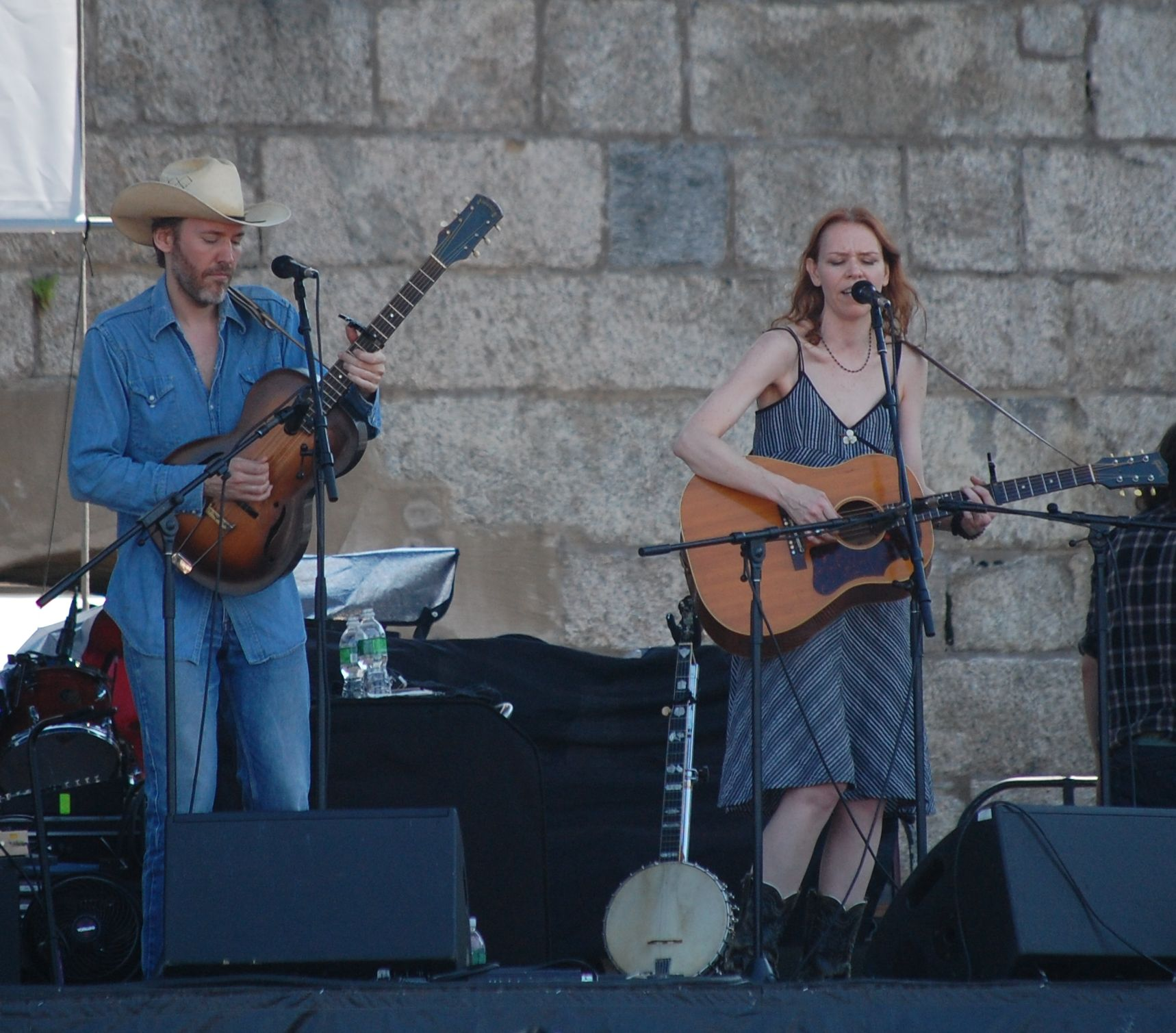
Rawlings and Welch performing at the 2009 Newport Folk Festival

Welch has said the album is about American history, rock 'n' roll, and country music. There are songs about the assassination of Abraham Lincoln, the Titanic Disaster, John Henry, and Elvis Presley. Time continues Welch and Rawlings' style of mellow and sparse arrangements. Welch explained, "As opposed to being little tiny folk songs or traditional songs, they're really tiny rock songs. They're just performed in this acoustic setting. In our heads we went electric without changing instruments."

Time (The Revelator) received extensive critical praise, most of which focused on the evolution of lyrics from mountain ballads. For Michael Shannon Friedman of The Charleston Gazette, "Welch's soul-piercing, backwoods quaver has always been a treasure, but on this record her songwriting is absolutely stunning." Critics compare the last track, the 15-minute "I Dream a Highway", to classics by Bob Dylan and Neil Young. Zac Johnson of AllMusic described "I Dream ..." as akin to "sweetly dozing in the [river] current like Huck and Jim's Mississippi River afternoons". No Depression's Grant Alden wrote, "Welch and Rawlings have gathered ... fragments from across the rich history of American music and reset them as small, subtle jewels adorning their own keenly observed, carefully constructed language." Time finished thirteenth in the 2001 Village Voice Pazz & Jop music critic poll. Time (The Revelator) appeared in best of decade lists of Rolling Stone, Paste, Uncut, The Irish Times, and the Ottawa Citizen. The album was nominated for the 2002 Grammy Award for Best Contemporary Folk Album, but lost to Bob Dylan's Love and Theft. Time peaked at No. 7 on the Billboard Independent Album chart.

The Revelator Collection DVD was released in 2002. It featured live performances and music videos of songs from Time, and some covers. The concert footage was filmed in 2001, and the music videos included Welch and Rawlings performing three songs at RCA Studio B. No Depression's Barry Mazor praised the DVD as an accompaniment for Time, calling it "one last exclamation point on that memorable and important project."

=== Soul Journey ===
"Wrecking Ball"
The final track on Gillian Welch's fourth album Soul Journey. The electric guitar and drums represent a new sound for Welch and David Rawlings

For the 2003 release, Soul Journey, Welch and Rawlings explored new territory. Welch said: "I wanted to make it a happier record. Out of our four records, I thought this might be the one where you're driving down the road listening to it on a sunny summer day." Rawlings again produced the record. The album also reflected a change in the typically sparse instrumentation: Welch and Rawlings introduced a dobro, violin, electric bass and drums, and Welch later said, "Everything's not supposed to sound the same, you want it to reflect change and growth."

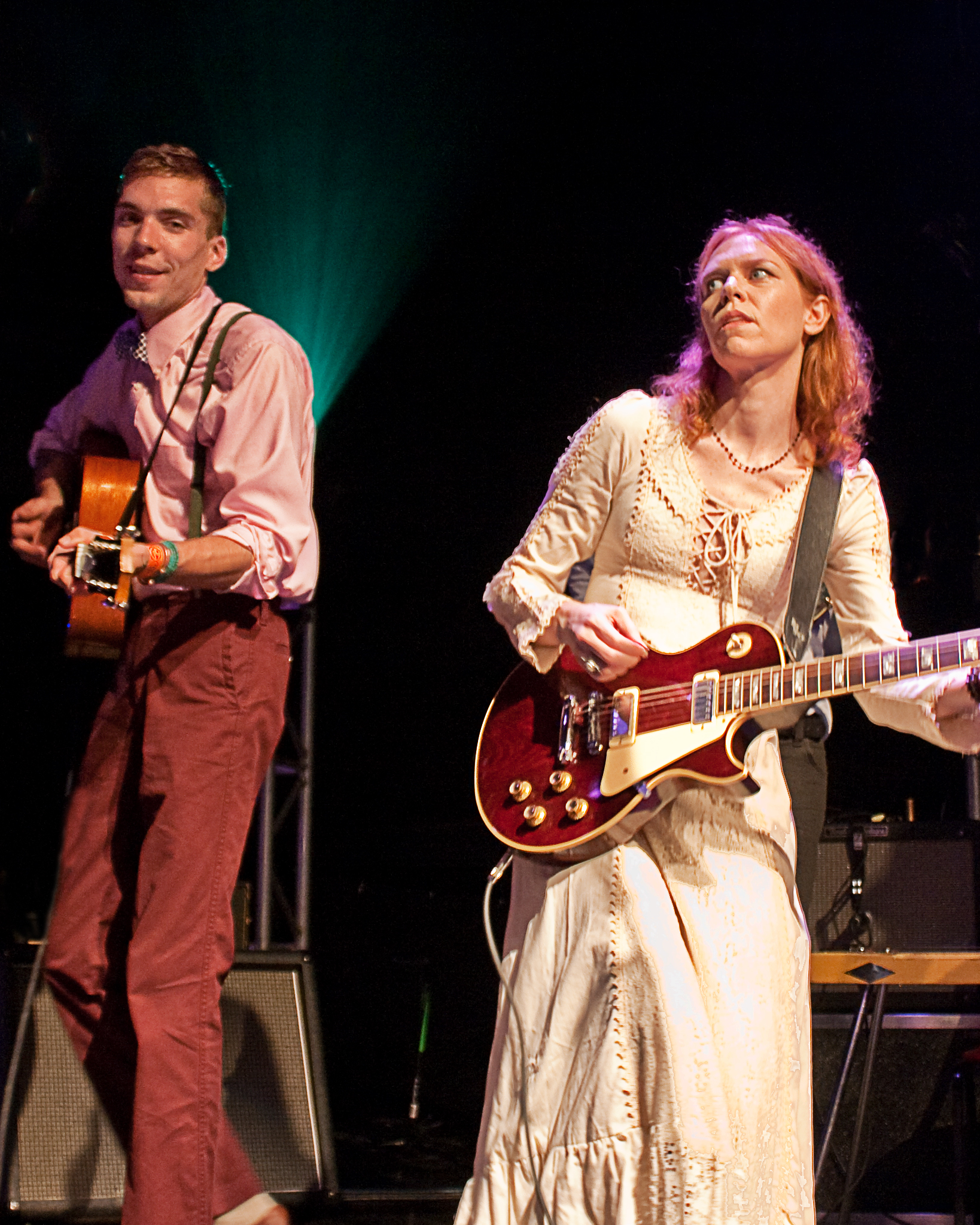
Welch performing with Justin Townes Earle in 2009

In three songs of Soul Journey, for the first time Welch and Rawlings recorded their own versions of traditional folk songs.

Soul Journey also garnered significant acclaim. John Harris of Mojo magazine described the album as "pretty much perfect", and Uncut's Barney Hoskyns favorably compared it to Bob Dylan and the Band's The Basement Tapes. Will Hermes of Entertainment Weekly wrote that Welch has "never sounded deeper, realer, or sexier." Soul Journey peaked at No. 107 on the Billboard charts, and reached No. 3 for Independent Albums.

=== David Rawlings Projects ===
In addition to their work released under her own name, Welch and Rawlings have continued to build upon their partnership with several releases under Rawlings' name. The Rawlings releases generally feature a larger string band and more lush arrangements than their Welch material, and have usually been released under the band name Dave Rawlings Machine. Andy Gill of The Independent described the band's 2009 debut album A Friend of a Friend as "akin to one of Welch's albums, but with the balance of their harmonies swapped to favour Rawlings' voice". Welch co-wrote five of the songs with Rawlings, and provided guitar and harmony vocals. Although ostensibly Rawlings' first solo album, Alex Ramon of PopMatters noted the similarities to Welch albums. Paste Magazine's Stephen Deusner praised A Friend of a Friend for incorporating "a wide swath of traditional American music," comments echoed by Rolling Stone's Will Hermes and in the PopMatters piece.

On September 18, 2015, the duo released their second album under the band title Dave Rawlings Machine, Nashville Obsolete. The band includes Willie Watson, Paul Kowert, Brittany Haas, and occasionally includes Jordan Tice.

Released on August 11, 2017, Poor David's Almanack was the first Welch/Rawlings collaboration to be released under the name David Rawlings, dropping the previous Dave Rawlings Machine moniker. The song “Cumberland Gap,” which features on the album, was nominated for the 2018 Grammy Award for Best American Roots Song. It was also utilized in the opening sequence of the 2019 Guy Ritchie film, The Gentlemen.

=== The Harrow & the Harvest ===
In a 2007 feature in The Guardian, critic John Harris expressed frustration that there had not been a Gillian Welch release in four years. Creation Records founder Alan McGee showed optimism about Welch and Rawlings testing out some new songs while opening some concerts for Rilo Kiley, and wrote in a 2009 blog entry "the long gestation period signals nothing less than a perfect album." In 2009, Rawlings said that recording for the next Gillian Welch album had started, but did not give a release date.

The Harrow & the Harvest was released on June 28, 2011. Welch attributed the long time period between releases to dissatisfaction with the songs they were writing. She explained: "Our songcraft slipped and I really don't know why. It's not uncommon. It's something that happens to writers. It's the deepest frustration we have come through, hence the album title." The writing process involved "this endless back and forth between the two of us," Welch said, stating that "It's our most intertwined, co-authored, jointly-composed album."

The album received praise from publications such as the Los Angeles Times, Uncut, and Rolling Stone. Thom Jurek of AllMusic wrote that the album "is stunning for its intimacy, its lack of studio artifice, its warmth and its timeless, if hard won, songcraft."

The album peaked at No. 20 on the US Billboard 200 and No. 25 on the UK Albums Chart. It was nominated for a Grammy for Best Contemporary Folk Album, as well as Best Engineered Album.

=== Boots No 1: The Official Revival Bootleg ===
Boots No 1: The Official Revival Bootleg, was released on November 25, 2016. The album celebrates the 20th anniversary of Welch's debut album, Revival, and includes outtakes, alternate versions, and demos of the songs featured on the original, as well as eight new unreleased tracks.

=== All the Good Times (Are Past & Gone) ===
In July 2020, Welch and Rawlings announced All the Good Times (Are Past & Gone), an album of covers and traditional songs recorded at their home during the COVID-19 lockdowns of 2020. All the Good Times is notably the first album in their decades-long history of collaboration to be released jointly in both of their names. The album won the 2021 Grammy Award for Best Folk Album.

=== Woodland ===
On July 19, 2024, Welch and Rawlings announced Woodland, to be released August 23, 2024 through Acony Records, and shared its first single, "Empty Trainload of Sky." The album is the first collection of original material from Welch since 2011's The Harrow & the Harvest, and the first from Rawlings since 2017's Poor David's Almanack. The album won the 2025 Grammy Award for Best Folk Album, marking Rawling's second win of the award and making him and Welch the only two people to have won the award more than once.

== Artistry ==
=== Musical style and influences ===
Welch and Rawlings incorporate elements of early twentieth century music such as old time, classic country, gospel and traditional bluegrass with modern elements of rhythm and blues, rock 'n' roll, jazz, and punk rock. The New Yorker's Alec Wilkinson maintained their musical style is "not easily classified—it is at once innovative and obliquely reminiscent of past rural forms".

The instrumentation on their songs is usually a simple arrangement, with Welch and Rawlings accompanying their own vocals with acoustic guitars, banjos, or a mandolin. Welch plays rhythm guitar with a 1956 Gibson J-50 (or banjo), while Rawlings plays lead on a 1935 Epiphone Olympic Guitar. The New Yorker's Wilkinson described Rawlings as a "strikingly inventive guitarist" who plays solos that are "daring melodic leaps". A review in No Depression by Andy Moore observed that Rawlings "squeezes, strokes, chokes and does just about everything but blow into" his guitar.

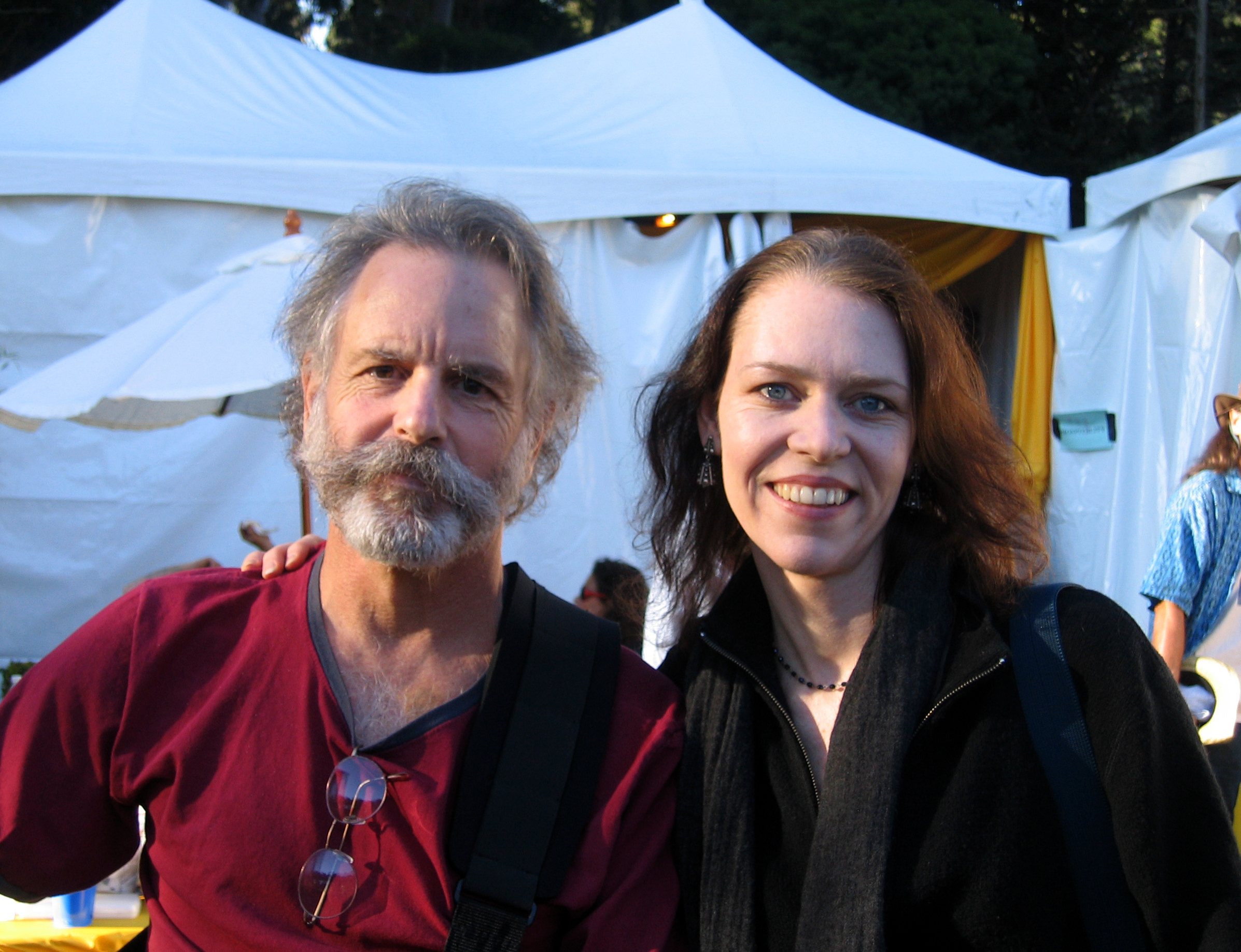
Welch with Bob Weir of the Grateful Dead at Hardly Strictly Bluegrass, 2006

... it wasn't until I became friends with Dave and Gil, about ten years ago, that I had people who understood songwriting and could express it to me in a way that left out the guesswork.

— Ketch Secor, Old Crow Medicine Show

Welch emphasizes music from a previous era as her major influence. She said that "by and large I listen to people who are dead. I'm really of the tried-and-true school. I let 50 years go by and see what's really relevant." Welch has acknowledged inspiration from several traditional country artists, including the Stanley Brothers, the Carter Family, the Louvin Brothers, and the Blue Sky Boys. She explained her relationship with traditional music by saying, "I've never tried to be traditional. It's been a springboard for me and I love it and revere it and would not be doing what I do without the music of the Monroe Brothers, the Stanley Brothers and the Carter Family. However, it was clear I was never going to be able to do exactly that; I'm a songwriter."

In addition to the strong country influence, Welch also draws on a repertoire of rock 'n' roll such artists as Bob Dylan, Chuck Berry, Neil Young, the Grateful Dead and the Velvet Underground. She said the alternative rock bands Throwing Muses, Pixies and Camper Van Beethoven "don't directly inform my music, but they're in there."

Welch has recorded songs with a variety of notable artists. Welch and Rawlings' contributions on Hitchcock's album Spooked was described by Christopher Bahn of The A.V. Club as "subtle but vital". She later created the cover art for Hitchcock's 2014 album The Man Upstairs. Mark Deming of AllMusic wrote that their work on Ryan Adams' album Heartbreaker "brought out the best in Adams".

=== Lyrical themes ===
Many songs performed by Welch and Rawlings contain dark themes about social outcasts struggling against such elements as poverty, drug addiction, death, a disconnection from their family, and an unresponsive God. Despite Welch being the lead singer, several of these characters are male. Welch has commented, "To be commercial, everybody wants happy love songs. People would flat-out ask me, 'Don't you have any happy love songs?' Well, as a matter of fact, I don't. I've got songs about orphans and morphine addicts." To reflect these themes, Welch and Rawlings often employ a slow pace to their songs. Their tempo is compared to a "slow heartbeat", and Cowperthwait of Rolling Stone observed that their songs "can lull you into near-hypnosis and then make your jaw drop with one final revelation".

=== Live performances ===
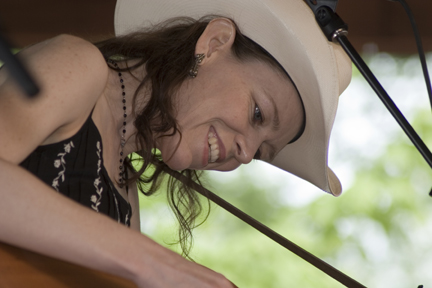
Welch performing in 2006

Welch and Rawlings have played many music festivals, including the Newport Folk Festival, Coachella Festival, the Telluride Bluegrass Festival, the Cambridge Folk Festival, Bonnaroo, MerleFest, the Austin City Limits Festival, and Farm Aid. They have toured North America extensively, and have played in Europe, Australia, and New Zealand. Concert reviews have praised the chemistry between Welch and Rawlings on stage. Tizzy Asher of the Seattle Post-Intelligencer wrote "there was a startling unspoken intimacy between them. They anticipated each other's movements and shifted when necessary to fit each other." On August 6, 2022, they performed on the Grand Ole Opry. In April 2026, they began the "Acoustic Reckoning" tour, designed as a tribute to the music of the Grateful Dead.

The Dave Rawlings Machine have toured North America, with the band originally composed of Rawlings, Welch and three members of Old Crow Medicine Show. The band is currently composed of Rawlings, Welch, Wilie Watson, Paul Kowert, and Brittany Haas. Welch and Rawlings also participate in group tours with notable musicians. In 2004, they were part of the Sweet Harmony Traveling Revue, a three-week US tour with Patty Griffin, Buddy Miller and Emmylou Harris. In 2009, the Dave Rawlings Machine joined Old Crow Medicine Show, the Felice Brothers and Justin Townes Earle for the Big Surprise Tour, a US tour described as a "roots-music extravaganza". In 2011, Welch was a support act for Buffalo Springfield, who performed and toured that year.

== Critical reception ==
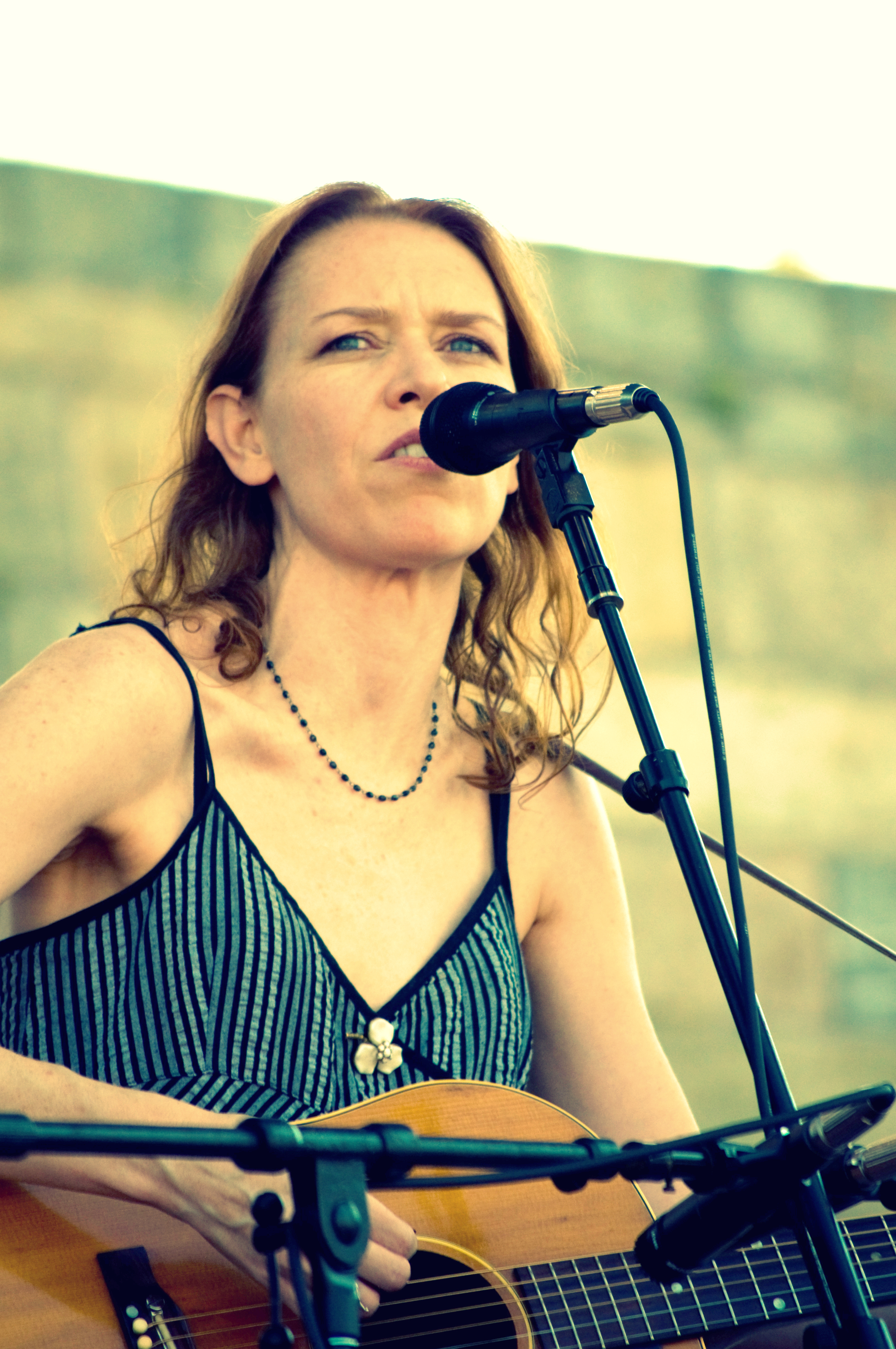
Welch performing at the 2009 Newport Folk Festival

Geoffrey Himes of The Washington Post described Welch as "one of the most interesting singer-songwriters of her generation". In 2003, Tom Kielty of The Boston Globe observed that she was "quietly establishing one of the most impressive catalogs in contemporary roots music", and a 2007 piece in The Guardian by John Harris called Welch "one of the decade's greatest talents". Critic Robert Hilburn of the Los Angeles Times wrote, "At every turn, she demonstrates a spark and commitment that should endear her to anyone from country and folk to pop and rock fans who appreciate imagination and heart."

When Welch's first two albums came out, critics questioned the authenticity of her music, as she was raised in Southern California, but performed Appalachian themed songs. For Revival, Welch was criticized for "manufacturing emotion", and a review of Hell Among the Yearlings by Chris Herrington of City Pages stated, "Welch is someone who discovered old-time music in college and decided that her own sheltered life could never be worth writing about", and that she is "completely devoid of individuality". Other critics rejected the notion that her background affects the authenticity of her music. Music critic Mark Kemp defended Welch in a New York Times piece:

The first-person protagonist of Ms. Welch's song ("Caleb Meyer") may be a young girl from a time and place that Ms. Welch will never fully understand, but the feelings the singer expresses about rape, and the respect she displays for her chosen musical genre, are nothing if not poignantly authentic. Likewise, it matters not whether Ms. Welch has ever walked the streets of "the black dust towns of East Tennessee" about which she sings in "Miner's Refrain" because the sense of foreboding that she expresses for the men who once labored in coal mines with futile hopes of a better life comes through loud and clear.

The Wall Street Journal's Taylor Holliday echoed this: "Stingy critics give Ms. Welch a hard time because she's a California city girl, not an Appalachian coal miner's daughter. But as Lucinda or Emmylou might attest, love of the music is not a birthright, but an earned right. Listen to Ms. Welch yodel, in a tune about that no-good "gal" Morphine, and you know she's as mountain as they come."

On September 16, 2015, the duo was awarded the Lifetime Achievement Award for Songwriting by the Americana Music Association.

== Discography ==
- Revival (1996)
- Hell Among the Yearlings (1998)
- Time (The Revelator) (2001)
- Soul Journey (2003)
- The Harrow & the Harvest (2011)
- All the Good Times (Are Past & Gone) with David Rawlings (2020)
- Woodland with David Rawlings (2024)

== Awards and nominations ==
Year	Association	Category	Nominated work	Result
1997	Grammy Awards	Best Contemporary Folk Album	Revival	Nominated
2001	International Bluegrass Music Awards	Gospel Recorded Performance of the Year	"I'll Fly Away" (with Alison Krauss)	Won
2001	International Bluegrass Music Awards	Recorded Event of the Year	Clinch Mountain Sweethearts (with Ralph Stanley and various artists)	Won
2001	International Bluegrass Music Awards	Album of the Year	O Brother, Where Art Thou? (with various artists)	Won
2001	Academy of Country Music Awards	Album of the Year	O Brother, Where Art Thou? (with various artists)	Won
2001	Country Music Association Awards	Album of the Year	O Brother, Where Art Thou? (with various artists)	Won
2001	Country Music Association Awards	Vocal Event of the Year	"Didn't Leave Nobody but the Baby" (with Alison Krauss and Emmylou Harris)	Nominated
2001	Country Music Association Awards	Vocal Event of the Year	"I'll Fly Away" (with Alison Krauss)	Nominated
2002	Grammy Awards	Album of the Year	O Brother, Where Art Thou? (with various artists)	Won
2002	Grammy Awards	Best Country Collaboration with Vocals	"Didn't Leave Nobody but the Baby" (with Alison Krauss and Emmylou Harris)	Nominated
2002	Grammy Awards	Best Contemporary Folk Album	Time (The Revelator)	Nominated
2002	Americana Music Honors & Awards	Album of the Year	Time (The Revelator)	Nominated
2002	Americana Music Honors & Awards	Song of the Year	"I Want To Sing That Rock & Roll" (with David Rawlings)	Nominated
2002	Americana Music Honors & Awards	Artist of the Year	Gillian Welch and David Rawlings	Nominated
2002	International Bluegrass Music Awards	Album of the Year	Down from the Mountain (with various artists)	Won
2012	Americana Music Honors & Awards	Artist of the Year	Gillian Welch	Won
2012	Grammy Awards	Best Folk Album	The Harrow & the Harvest (with David Rawlings)	Nominated
2015	Americana Music Honors & Awards	Lifetime Achievement Award for Songwriting	Gillian Welch and David Rawlings	Won
2018	Grammy Awards	Best American Roots Song	"Cumberland Gap" (with David Rawlings)	Nominated Thomas Wolfe Prize won
2019	Academy Awards	Best Original Song	"When a Cowboy Trades His Spurs for Wings" (with David Rawlings)	Nominated
2021	Grammy Awards	Best Folk Album	All the Good Times (Are Past & Gone) (with David Rawlings)	Won
2025	Grammy Awards	Best Folk Album	Woodland (with David Rawlings)	Won
2025	Americana Music Honors & Awards	Album of the Year	Woodland (with David Rawlings)	Nominated
2025	Americana Music Honors & Awards	Duo/Group of the Year	Gillian Welch and David Rawlings	Won
2026	Americana Music Honors & Awards	Duo/Group of the Year	Gillian Welch and David Rawlings	Won
