= The Chicks discography =

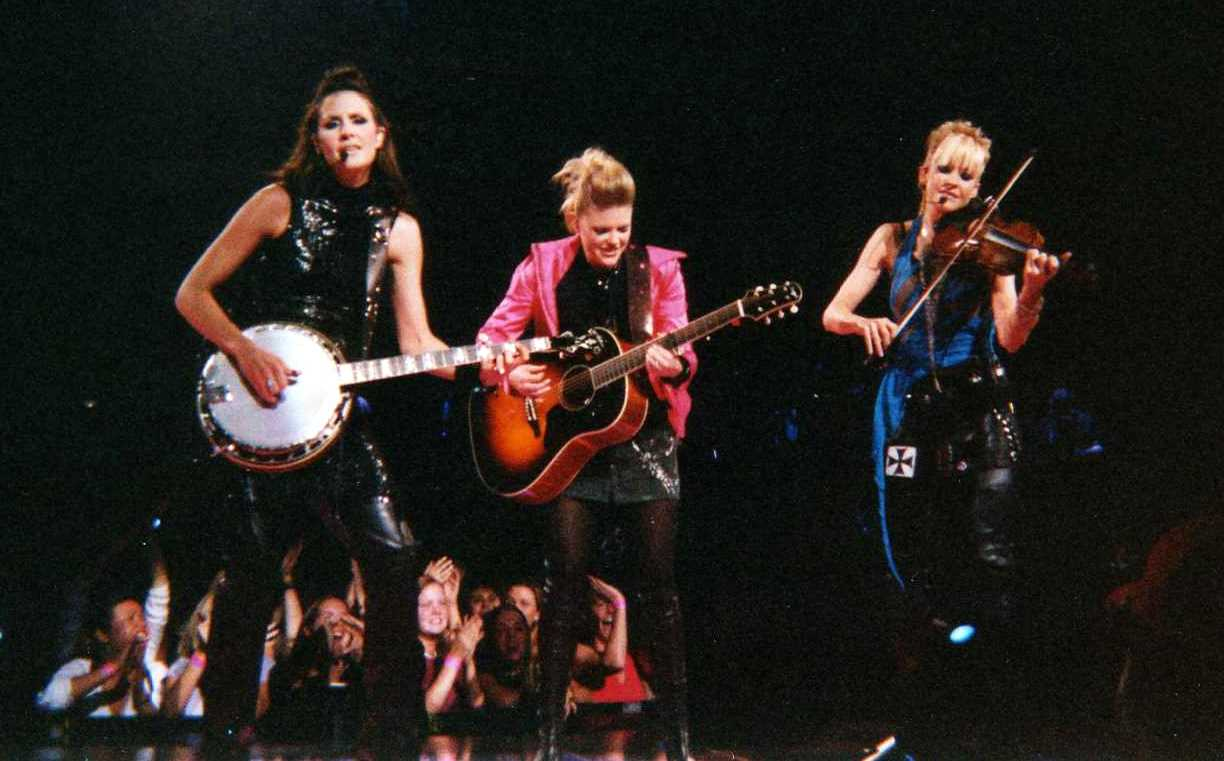
- Studio albums: 8
- Live albums: 2
- Compilation albums: 2
- Singles: 27
- Video albums: 5
- Music videos: 16
- No. 1 Singles: 7

The Chicks (formerly known as the Dixie Chicks) are an American country music band composed of Natalie Maines, along with Emily Strayer and Martie Maguire, who are sisters. Their discography comprises eight studio albums, two live albums and 27 singles.

Founded in 1989 as a more bluegrass-oriented band with Maguire and Strayer—then going by their birth surnames of Erwin—along with Laura Lynch and Robin Lynn Macy, the band did not achieve mainstream success until Lynch and Macy left and were replaced by lead singer Natalie Maines. Shortly after her joining, the band signed to Monument Records, releasing their breakthrough album Wide Open Spaces in 1998. Both it and its followup, 1999's Fly, earned the group several Grammy Awards and chart singles. Two more albums, Home and Taking the Long Way, followed in 2002 and 2006, respectively, on Columbia Records. These latter four albums have been certified double platinum or higher by the RIAA, with the highest-certified being Wide Open Spaces at 13× Platinum for US shipments of 13 million copies.

Of the Dixie Chicks' 25 singles, six have reached Number One on the Billboard country singles chart: "There's Your Trouble", "Wide Open Spaces", "You Were Mine", "Cowboy Take Me Away", "Without You", and "Travelin' Soldier". A seventh, a version of the Fleetwood Mac song "Landslide", was also a Number One hit on the Adult Contemporary chart. Several of their singles have crossed over to the Billboard Hot 100, with their highest-peaking there being the number 4, "Not Ready to Make Nice".

== Albums ==
=== Studio albums ===
Title	Album details	Peak chart positions										Certifications (sales thresholds)
Title	Album details	US	US Country	AUS	CAN	GER	IRE	NZ	SWE	SWI	UK	Certifications (sales thresholds)
Thank Heavens for Dale Evans	Release date: December 1, 1990; Label: Crystal Clear; Formats: CD, cassette	—	—	—	—	—	—	—	—	—	—	
Little Ol' Cowgirl	Release date: May 1, 1992; Label: Crystal Clear; Formats: CD, cassette	—	—	—	—	—	—	—	—	—	—	
Shouldn't a Told You That	Release date: November 2, 1993; Label: Crystal Clear; Formats: CD, cassette	—	—	—	—	—	—	—	—	—	—	
Wide Open Spaces	Release date: January 27, 1998; Label: Monument; Formats: CD, cassette	4	1	35	16	—	—	33	—	—	26	RIAA: 13× Platinum; ARIA: 3× Platinum; BPI: Gold; MC: 4× Platinum; RMMZ: Gold
Fly	Release date: August 31, 1999; Label: Monument; Formats: CD, cassette	1	1	16	6	—	—	—	—	—	38	RIAA: 11× Platinum; ARIA: Platinum; BPI: Gold; MC: 6× Platinum
Home	Release date: August 27, 2002; Label: Open Wide/Columbia; Formats: CD, vinyl	1	1	4	2	11	7	8	37	26	33	RIAA: 6× Platinum; ARIA: 4× Platinum; BPI: Gold; BVMI: Gold; MC: 3× Platinum; RMNZ: Platinum
Taking the Long Way	Release date: May 23, 2006; Label: Open Wide/Columbia; Formats: CD, vinyl, Digital download	1	1	2	1	5	7	5	1	6	10	RIAA: 2× Platinum; ARIA: 3× Platinum; BPI: Gold; BVMI: Gold; IFPI SWE: Gold; IFPI SWI: Gold; IRMA: Platinum; MC: 4× Platinum; RMNZ: 2× Platinum
Gaslighter	Released: July 17, 2020; Label: Columbia; Format: CD, vinyl, digital download	3	1	2	3	14	20	2	14	5	5	
"—" denotes releases that did not chart

=== Live albums ===
Title	Album details	Peak chart positions								Certifications (sales thresholds)
Title	Album details	US	US Country	AUS	GER	NLD	NZ	SCO	UK	Certifications (sales thresholds)
Top of the World Tour: Live	Release date: November 23, 2003; Label: Open Wide/Columbia Records; Formats: CD	27	3	30	63	—	41	—	194	RIAA: Platinum; ARIA: Platinum
DCX MMXVI Live	Release date: September 1, 2017; Label: Columbia Records; Formats: CD, digital download	—	43	20	—	90	—	28	— (Note: DCX MMXVI Live did not enter the UK Albums Chart, but peaked at number 1 on the UK Country Compilations Chart and number 52 on the UK Album Sales Chart.)	
"—" denotes releases that did not chart

=== Compilation albums ===
Title	Album details	Peak chart positions										Certifications (sales thresholds)
Title	Album details	US	US Country	AUS	CAN	IRE	NZ	SCO	SWE	SWI	UK	Certifications (sales thresholds)
Playlist: The Very Best of Dixie Chicks	Release date: June 1, 2010; Label: Columbia Records; Formats: CD, digital download	115	27	—	—	—	40	—	—	—	—	
The Essential Dixie Chicks	Release date: August 24, 2010; Label: Legacy Recordings; Formats: CD, digital download	161	19	16	65	92	3	27	19	58	— (Note: The Essential Dixie Chicks did not enter the UK Albums Chart, but peaked at number 43 on the UK Album Downloads Chart.)	ARIA: Platinum; BPI: Gold; RMNZ: Platinum
The Classic Albums Collection	Release date: April 15, 2016; Label: Columbia Records; Formats: Digital download	—	—	35	—	—	—	88	—	—	— (Note: The Classic Albums Collection did not enter the UK Albums Chart, but peaked at number 2 on the UK Country Compilations Chart.)	
"—" denotes releases that did not chart

== Singles ==
Title	Year	Peak chart positions										Certifications (sales threshold)	Album
Title	Year	US	US Country	US Country Airplay	US AC	AUS	CAN	CAN Country	IRE	NZ	UK	Certifications (sales threshold)	Album
"I Can Love You Better"	1997	77	7		—	—	—	3	—	—	—		Wide Open Spaces
"There's Your Trouble"	1998	36	1		—	—	—	3	—	—	26	RIAA: Gold	Wide Open Spaces
"Wide Open Spaces"	1998	41	1		—	94	—	1	—	—	—	RIAA: 2× Platinum; ARIA: Gold; RMNZ: Gold	Wide Open Spaces
"You Were Mine"	1998	34	1		—	—	—	1	—	—	—	RIAA: Gold	Wide Open Spaces
"Tonight the Heartache's on Me"	1999	46	6		—	—	—	4	—	—	—		Wide Open Spaces
"Ready to Run"	1999	39	2		—	91	—	3	—	—	53	RIAA: Gold	Fly
"Cowboy Take Me Away"	1999	27	1		—	—	—	1	—	—	—	RIAA: 2× Platinum; RMNZ: Platinum	Fly
"Goodbye Earl"	2000	19	13		—	—	—	5	—	—	—	RIAA: Platinum	Fly
"Cold Day in July"	2000	65	10		—	—	—	7	—	—	—		Fly
"Without You"	2000	31	1		—	—	—	8	—	—	—		Fly
"If I Fall You're Going Down with Me"	2001	38	3		—	—	—	—	—	—	—		Fly
"Heartbreak Town"	2001	— (Note: "Heartbreak Town" did not enter the Billboard Hot 100, but peaked at number 21 on the Bubbling Under Hot 100 Singles chart.)	23		—	—	—	—	—	—	—		Fly
"Some Days You Gotta Dance"	2001	55	7		—	—	—	—	—	—	—		Fly
"Long Time Gone"	2002	7	2		—	—	—	—	—	—	—		Home
"Landslide"	2002	7	2		1	6	2	—	46	27	55	RIAA: 2× Platinum; ARIA: 3× Platinum; BPI: Silver; RMNZ: 2× Platinum	Home
"Travelin' Soldier"	2002	25	1		—	—	—	—	27	—	119	RIAA: Platinum; BPI: Silver; RMNZ: Platinum	Home
"Godspeed (Sweet Dreams)"	2003	—	48		—	—	—	—	—	—	—		Home
"Top of the World"	2003	—	—		—	—	—	—	—	—	—		Home
"I Hope"	2005	—	54		—	—	—	—	—	—	—		Taking the Long Way
"Not Ready to Make Nice"	2006	4	36		32	18	3	17	47	—	70	RIAA: 2× Platinum; ARIA: 3× Platinum; MC: Platinum; RMNZ: Platinum	Taking the Long Way
"Everybody Knows"	2006	—	45		—	—	—	14	—	—	—		Taking the Long Way
"Voice Inside My Head"	2006	—	—		—	—	—	—	—	—	—		Taking the Long Way
"Easy Silence"	2006	—	—		—	—	—	—	—	—	—		Taking the Long Way
"The Long Way Around"	2006	—	—		—	—	54	5	—	—	—		Taking the Long Way
"The Neighbor"	2007	74	—		—	—	—	48	—	—	—		Non-album single
"Gaslighter"	2020	— (Note: "Gaslighter" did not enter the Billboard Hot 100, but peaked at number 7 on the Bubbling Under Hot 100 Singles chart.)	20	36	—	—	69	31	—	—	—		Gaslighter
"Sleep at Night"	2020	—	33	—	—	—	—	35	—	—	—		Gaslighter
"—" denotes a release that did not chart or was not released in that country.

== Other charted songs ==
Title	Year	Peak chart positions				Certifications (sales threshold)	Album
Title	Year	US	US Country	AUS	CAN	Certifications (sales threshold)	Album
"Let 'er Rip"	1999	—	64	—	—		Wide Open Spaces
"You Can't Hurry Love"	1999	—	60	91	—		Runaway Bride: Music from the Motion Picture
"Sin Wagon"	1999	—	52	—	—		Fly
"Roly Poly" (with Asleep at the Wheel)	2000	—	65	—	—		Ride with Bob: A Tribute to Bob Wills and the Texas Playboys
"Travelin' Soldier" (Live at the 2001 CMA Awards)	2002	—	57	—	—		Non-album single
"White Trash Wedding"	2002	—	56	—	—		Home
"Tortured, Tangled Hearts"	2002	—	58	—	—		Home
"Lullaby"	2006	— (Note: "Lullaby" did not enter the Billboard Hot 100, but peaked at number 7 on the Bubbling Under Hot 100 Singles chart.)	—	—	—	RIAA: Gold	Taking the Long Way
"Soon You'll Get Better" (Taylor Swift featuring Dixie Chicks)	2019	63	10	54	71	ARIA: Gold; RMNZ: Gold	Lover
"Julianna Calm Down"	2020	—	— (Note: "Julianna Calm Down" did not enter the US Hot Country Songs chart, but peaked at number 15 on the Country Digital Song Sales chart.)	—	—		Gaslighter
"March March"	2020	— (Note: "March March" did not enter the US Billboard Hot 100, but peaked at number 5 on the Digital Song Sales chart.)	32	— (Note: "March March" did not enter the Canadian Hot 100, but peaked at number 8 on the Hot Canadian Digital Song Sales chart.)	—		Gaslighter
"—" denotes releases that did not chart

== Videography ==
=== Video albums ===
Title	Details	Certifications (sales threshold)
An Evening with the Dixie Chicks	Release date: December 10, 2002; Directed by: Joel Gallen	RIAA: 2× Platinum; ARIA: 5× Platinum
Top of the World Tour: Live	Release date: November 21, 2003; Label: Sony BMG	RIAA: Platinum; ARIA: 7× Platinum
Dixie Chicks: Shut Up and Sing	Release date: October 27, 2007; Directed by: Barbara Kopple and Cecilia Peck	
VH1 Storytellers	Release date: November 29, 2011; Directed by: Dave Diomedi	
DCX MMXVI Live	Release date: September 1, 2017	

=== Music videos ===
Title	Year	Director(s)
"I Can Love You Better"	1997	chris rogers [sic]
"There's Your Trouble"	1998	Thom Oliphant
"Wide Open Spaces"	1998	Thom Oliphant
"You Were Mine"	1998	Adolfo Doring
"Ready to Run"	1999	Evan Bernard
"Cowboy Take Me Away"	1999	Nancy Bardawil
"Goodbye Earl"	2000	Evan Bernard
"Without You"	2000	Thom Oliphant
"Long Time Gone"	2002	Marcus Raboy
"Landslide"	2002	Jim Gable
"Travelin' Soldier" (Live)	2003	Joel Gallen
"Top of the World"	2003	Sophie Muller
"Sin Wagon" (Live)	2003	Luis Lopeez; Darrin Roberts
"Not Ready to Make Nice"	2006	Sophie Muller
"Gaslighter"	2020	Seanne Farmer
"Sleep at Night"	2020	
"March March"	2020	

== Guest appearances ==
Year	Title	Other artist(s)	Album
1998	"Stand by Your Man"	—N/a	A Tribute to Tradition
2006	"Shower the People"	—N/a	MusicAres
2008	"The Lucky Ones"	—N/a	REDWire
2011	"You"	Steve Martin and the Steep Canyon Rangers	Rare Bird Alert
2016	"Daddy Lessons" (Remix)	Beyoncé	Non-album song
2019	"Soon You'll Get Better"	Taylor Swift	Lover
