= The Essential Dixie Chicks =

Compilation album by Dixie Chicks
- Released: August 24, 2010
- Recorded: 1997–2006
- Genre: Country
- Label: Sony Music Australia
- Producer: Various original producers

Dixie Chicks chronology
Playlist: The Very Best of Dixie Chicks (2010)	The Essential Dixie Chicks (2010)	Gaslighter (2020)

The Essential Dixie Chicks is a 2010 greatest hits album from American country music group Dixie Chicks. The pair of discs contain thirty songs personally selected by the Dixie Chicks from their fourth through seventh studio albums. The album is a part of the Sony Music's The Essential series. The album was released in countries such as Canada, Australia, and New Zealand on August 24, 2010, and was released in the United States on October 26 of that year.

== Critical reception ==
AllMusic reviewer Stephen Thomas Erlewine gave the compilation 4.5 stars out of 5, saying that "Some may grumble about the sequencing, but it flows nicely and has all the hits while illustrating the depth of the band’s catalog, which is enough to make it as essential as billed." Bobby Peacock of Roughstock gave it an identical rating, also praising it as a "comprehensive" representation of the group's career, although he criticized it for omitting "Cold Day in July" and including too many album cuts from Taking the Long Way in comparison to their other albums.

== Track listing ==
=== Disc 1 ===
1. "Not Ready to Make Nice" (from Taking the Long Way, 2006)
2. "The Long Way Around" (from Taking the Long Way)
3. "Easy Silence" (from Taking the Long Way)
4. "Lubbock or Leave It" (from Taking the Long Way)
5. "Bitter End" (from Taking the Long Way)
6. "Silent House" (from Taking the Long Way)
7. "Lullaby" (from Taking the Long Way)
8. "Everybody Knows" (from Taking the Long Way)
9. "Long Time Gone" (from Home, 2002)
10. "Travelin' Soldier" (from Home)
11. "Landslide" (Fleetwood Mac cover) (from Home)
12. "Lil' Jack Slade" (from Home)
13. "Truth No. 2" (From Home)
14. "White Trash Wedding" (from Home)
15. "Top of the World" (from Home)

=== Disc 2 ===
1. "Ready to Run" (from Fly, 1999)
2. "Cowboy, Take Me Away" (from Fly)
3. "Goodbye, Earl" (from Fly)
4. "Some Days, You Gotta Dance" (from Fly)
5. "Heartbreak Town" (from Fly)
6. "Sin Wagon" (from Fly)
7. "Without You" (from Fly)
8. "Let Him Fly" (from Fly)
9. "Wide Open Spaces" (from Wide Open Spaces, 1998)
10. "There's Your Trouble" (from Wide Open Spaces)
11. "You Were Mine" (from Wide Open Spaces)
12. "I Can Love You Better"(from Wide Open Spaces)
13. "Tonight the Heartache's on Me" (from Wide Open Spaces)
14. "Give It Up or Let Me Go" (from Wide Open Spaces)
15. "I Believe in Love" (from Home)

== Charts ==
Chart (2010–16)	Peak position
Australian Albums Chart	16
New Zealand Albums Chart	3
Swedish Albums Chart	19
US Billboard 200	179
US Billboard Country Albums	40

== Certifications ==
Region	Certification	Certified units/sales
Australia (ARIA)	Platinum	70,000^{^}
New Zealand (RMNZ)	Platinum	15,000^{‡}
United Kingdom (BPI)	Gold	100,000^{‡}
^{^} Shipments figures based on certification alone.^{‡} Sales+streaming figures based on certification alone.
