= Top of the World Tour: Live (video) =

Video by Dixie Chicks
- Released: November 21, 2003
- Recorded: June–August 2003
- Genre: Country
- Length: 85 minutes
- Label: Sony
- Producer: Dixie Chicks, Lloyd Maines

Top of the World Tour: Live was released by the Dixie Chicks as a DVD on November 21, 2003. It is a concert video that documents performances from the group's 2003 Top of the World Tour. On December 16, 2003, Top of the World Tour: Live (DVD) was certified Platinum by the Recording Industry Association of America.

== Track listing ==
1. "Goodbye Earl"
2. "Some Days You Gotta Dance"
3. "There's Your Trouble"
4. "Long Time Gone"
5. "Tortured, Tangled Hearts"
6. "Travelin' Soldier"
7. "Hello Mr. Heartache"
8. "Cold Day in July"
9. "White Trash Wedding"
10. "Lil' Jack Slade"
11. "A Home"
12. "If I Fall You're Going Down With Me"
13. "Cowboy Take Me Away"
14. "Godspeed (Sweet Dreams)"
15. "Landslide"
16. "Ready to Run"
17. "Wide Open Spaces"
18. "Sin Wagon"
- Bonus "Top of the World" Video

== Personnel ==
=== Dixie Chicks ===
- Natalie Maines - Lead Vocals, Guitar
- Emily Robison - Guitar, Dobro, Banjo, Vocals
- Martie Maguire - Fiddle, Mandolin, Vocals

=== Band ===
- David Grissom - Band Leader, Electric Guitar, Acoustic Guitar
- Roscoe Beck - Electric Bass, Upright Bass
- John Deaderick - Keyboards, B-3 Organ, Accordion
- John Gardner - Drums, Percussion
- John Mock - Acoustic Guitar, Papoose, Irish Whistles, Concertina/Percussion
- Keith Sewell - Acoustic Guitar
- Brent Truitt - Mandolin
- Robby Turner - Steel Guitar, Dobro

=== Strings ===
- Lorenza Ponce - Violin, String Leader
- Matt Brubeck - Cello
- Linda Ghidossi-Deluca - Viola
- Hiroko Taguchi - Violin

== Charts ==
| Chart | Peak |
|---|---|
| ARIA Top 40 DVD Chart | 3 |

=== Certifications ===
| Region | Certification | Certified units/sales |
|---|---|---|
| Australia (ARIA) | 7× Platinum | 105,000^{^} |
| United States (RIAA) | Platinum | 100,000^{^} |
^{^} Shipments figures based on certification alone.
