= Fly Tour =

2000 concert tour by the Dixie Chicks

- Tour by Dixie Chicks
- Associated album: Fly
- Start date: June 1, 2000
- End date: December 3, 2000
- Legs: 4
- No. of shows: 89 in North America

Dixie Chicks concert chronology
- Fly Tour (2000); Top of the World Tour (2003)

The Fly Tour (2000) was the debut North American concert tour by country music band The Chicks' (formerly the Dixie Chicks), performing sold-out shows in over 80 cities across Canada and the contiguous United States. The tour was primarily in-support of their sophomore album Fly (1999), as well as featuring songs from their debut album, Wide Open Spaces (1998). The Chicks would also feature several new or specially-selected songs at various stops on the tour, as well as an instrumental bluegrass “jam” piece titled “Roanoke”, alternating with another instrumental called simple “Brilliancy”.

== History ==
Announced in mid-April 2000, this was the Dixie Chicks' first headlining tour. In this tour, the band started playing mostly in arenas. Since their sudden jump in the group's popularity in 1998, they played as a supporting act for Tim McGraw and as part of the George Strait Country Music Festival and Lilith Fair, seeking to expose themselves to diverse audiences and building a fan base. The live reputation the group developed for their instrumental prowess and performance strengths led to them embarking upon an ambitious, high-profile, large-venue tour of their own.

Begun at the start of June 2000 with five dates in Canada, and with occasional two-week breaks in between legs, the tour was originally scheduled to end in September. However, after having grossed over $25 million for about 50 dates, and averaging about 13,000 fans per show, it was extended until early December, when it concluded with four dates in the Chicks' native Texas.

In terms of commercial impact, LiveDaily termed the tour "a runaway success", and it came at a time when the country music genre was in a box-office slump. It represented an innovation in a business sense, as three different promoters were used, covering different geographical regions of the country, rather than the more typical use of a different local promoter at each stop. Chicks management did this in order to get more consistent messaging in marketing and promotion, which itself was aided by an over $3 million national advertising campaign. The comically themed commercials showed the Chicks as touring neophytes, learning how to smash banjos and tear up hotel rooms. Tour sponsors were MusicCountry.com and CMT, while one dollar of each ticket sale was donated to the World Wildlife Fund.

In the end, the Fly Tour grossed over $47 million, with an average attendance of over 12,000. It was the biggest country music tour in 2000 by any single act (trailing only the joint Tim McGraw–Faith Hill Soul2Soul Tour) and the sixth highest-grossing tour of any genre during the year.

For 2000, the tour was nominated for Pollstar's most important award, that of Major Tour of the Year, but lost out to the Bruce Springsteen and the E Street Band Reunion Tour. It did however win Pollstar's Personal Manager of the Year award for the group's manager, Simon Renshaw, who had negotiated the unusual promotion arrangements.

The tour also had a cultural effect: the Encyclopedia of the Great Plains stated that the Fly Tour "gained a life of its own, making the Dixie Chicks a pop-cultural phenomenon, with young and enthusiastic audiences flocking" to see the group.

== The show ==
The shows themselves attracted both parents and their children. In particular, young girls could be seen dressing as their favorite member of the trio. Slogans such as "Chicks Rule!" and "Chicks Kick Ass!" were prevalent during the tour.

Production values were emphasized for the show, with eight trucks required to haul it. A six-man band backed the three Chicks. Stage and show design involved members of the Cirque du Soleil team, including lighting designer Luc Lafortune. The stage was surrounded by a curtain that resembled a pair of jeans, complete with a working zipper. Various interactive pre-show activities kept the audience busy, as a huge remote-controlled mechanical fly circled over the audience. Then the show began, by the zipper dropping and the curtain falling away.

The Dixie Chicks' generally performed for about an hour and a half. The themes of the show veered between love songs and declarations of female independence, with the opener "Ready to Run" and the climactic "Goodbye Earl" both exemplifying the latter. Video screens would sometimes show the music videos that went with a song, and other times would show humorous interludes, such as the trio's own fashion disasters from the past. Other stage effects included a night full of stars with a setting moon for "Cowboy Take Me Away", and bubbles representing snow falling from the rafters for "Cold Day in July". The main set generally finished with what would become a furious concert staple of theirs, "Sin Wagon"; for the encores, "Goodbye Earl" – the song of the moment for Chicks fans – was often performed with the three Chicks spread out among the audience in different corners of the venue, while "Wide Open Spaces" was the occasion for a mass sing-along.

By the later stages of the tour, lead singer Natalie Maines was visibly pregnant with her first child, and was able to rest during the middle section of the show, which featured the trio performing numbers such as Sheryl Crow's "Strong Enough" while sitting on a couch.

Critical reaction to the Fly Tour shows was generally positive. The New York Times called it "a slick, good-natured show that seesawed between clinging love songs and declarations of female independence." Rolling Stone said that while the group "can pop and rock with conviction", at other times the show represented "stone-cold, hard-core honky tonk at its best", and that the youthful audience's roars of approval for the sisters' instrumental virtuosity – which it compared to those Eddie Van Halen got for guitar solos – was "damn near revolutionary". Rolling Stone did criticize the "overly ambitious stage and lighting design" for detracting from the on-stage intimacy between the three group members and their backing band, while The University News praised it, saying the show "appealed to the eyes with its unique stage and interesting special effects." The Daily Universe's reviewer called the group "the most exciting country-and-western group I have ever seen," while KAOS2000 magazine said "this trio of hotties know how to put on a show and definitely had control of the big arena stage." A Citysearch.com writer said that Maines' voice was not the strongest in performance, but benefited from the joint strength when combined with the sisters'.

== Broadcasts and recordings ==
The August shows at Washington, D.C.'s MCI Center were filmed and used as the basis for an NBC network special called, "Dixie Chicks: On the Fly". The special aired November 20, 2000.

== Opening acts ==
- Patty Griffin (select shows)
- Ricky Skaggs (select shows)
- Joe Ely (September, select shows)
- Willie Nelson (October, select shows)
- Grupo Vida (October, select shows)
- The Maines Brothers Band (Lubbock)

== Setlist ==
1. "Ready to Run"
2. "There's Your Trouble"
3. "Hello Mr. Heartache"
4. "Don't Waste Your Heart"
5. "Without You"
6. "If I Fall You're Going Down with Me"
7. "I Can Love You Better"
8. "You Were Mine"
9. "Give It Up or Let Me Go"
10. "Video Sequence"
11. "Let Him Fly"
12. "Heartbreak Town"
13. "Strong Enough"
14. "Brilliancy" (and/or "Roanoke" with a snippet of "Dixie Chicken")
15. "Let 'Er Rip"
16. "Tonight the Heartache's on Me"
17. "Cold Day in July"
18. "Some Days You Gotta Dance"
19. "Cowboy Take Me Away"
20. "Sin Wagon"

Encore

21. "Goodbye Earl"
22. "Wide Open Spaces"

There were some minor changes to this order depending on the venue and the opening act. "Am I the Only One (Who's Ever Felt This Way)", "Loving Arms", "Truth No.2", and "Merry Christmas From the Family" were also played during the tour.

== Tour dates ==
Date	City	Country	Venue	Tickets Sold / Available	Revenue
North America
June 1, 2000	Winnipeg	Canada	Winnipeg Arena	—N/a	—N/a
June 2, 2000	Saskatoon	Canada	Saskatchewan Place	—N/a	—N/a
June 3, 2000	Edmonton	Canada	Skyreach Centre	—N/a	—N/a
June 4, 2000	Calgary	Canada	Pengrowth Saddledome	—N/a	—N/a
June 8, 2000	Vancouver	Canada	General Motors Place	—N/a	—N/a
June 9, 2000	Spokane	United States	Spokane Veterans Memorial Arena	—N/a	—N/a
June 10, 2000	Tacoma	United States	Tacoma Dome	20,018 / 20,018	$777,632
June 11, 2000	Portland	United States	Rose Garden Arena	15,636 / 15,636	$607,184
June 15, 2000	Sacramento	United States	ARCO Arena	—N/a	—N/a
June 16, 2000	San Jose	United States	San Jose Arena	—N/a	—N/a
June 17, 2000	Anaheim	United States	Arrowhead Pond	—N/a	—N/a
June 18, 2000	Phoenix	United States	America West Arena	—N/a	—N/a
June 19, 2000	Anaheim	United States	Arrowhead Pond	—N/a	—N/a
June 22, 2000	San Diego	United States	Cox Arena at Aztec Bowl	—N/a	—N/a
June 23, 2000	Las Vegas	United States	Thomas & Mack Center	—N/a	—N/a
June 24, 2000	Salt Lake City	United States	Delta Center	—N/a	—N/a
June 25, 2000	Nampa	United States	Idaho Center Arena	—N/a	—N/a
June 29, 2000	North Little Rock	United States	Alltel Arena	—N/a	—N/a
June 30, 2000	Lafayette	United States	Cajundome	—N/a	—N/a
July 1, 2000	Biloxi	United States	Mississippi Coast Coliseum	—N/a	—N/a
July 13, 2000	Chicago	United States	United Center	—N/a	—N/a
July 14, 2000	Milwaukee	United States	Bradley Center	—N/a	—N/a
July 15, 2000	Minneapolis	United States	Target Center	—N/a	—N/a
July 16, 2000	Fargo	United States	Fargodome	—N/a	—N/a
July 19, 2000	New York City	United States	Radio City Music Hall	—N/a	—N/a
July 20, 2000	New York City	United States	Radio City Music Hall	—N/a	—N/a
July 21, 2000	Albany	United States	Pepsi Arena	—N/a	—N/a
July 22, 2000	Worcester	United States	Worcester's Centrum Centre	—N/a	—N/a
July 23, 2000	Buffalo	United States	HSBC Arena	—N/a	—N/a
August 3, 2000	Denver	United States	Pepsi Center	—N/a	—N/a
August 4, 2000	Kansas City	United States	Kemper Arena	14,426 / 14,426	$557,078
August 5, 2000	Oklahoma City	United States	Myriad Convention Center Arena	—N/a	—N/a
August 6, 2000	Lubbock	United States	United Spirit Arena	—N/a	—N/a
August 10, 2000	Dallas	United States	Reunion Arena	27,456 / 27,456	$1,063,847
August 11, 2000	Dallas	United States	Reunion Arena	27,456 / 27,456	$1,063,847
August 12, 2000	Austin	United States	Frank Erwin Center	—N/a	—N/a
August 13, 2000	Houston	United States	Compaq Center	—N/a	—N/a
August 17, 2000	Louisville	United States	Freedom Hall	15,974 / 15,974	$629,952
August 18, 2000	Auburn Hills	United States	The Palace of Auburn Hills	—N/a	—N/a
August 19, 2000	Auburn Hills	United States	The Palace of Auburn Hills	—N/a	—N/a
August 20, 2000	Toronto	Canada	Air Canada Centre	—N/a	—N/a
August 24, 2000	Washington, D.C.	United States	MCI Center	—N/a	—N/a
August 25, 2000	Washington, D.C.	United States	MCI Center	—N/a	—N/a
August 26, 2000	Winston-Salem	United States	Lawrence Joel Veterans Memorial Coliseum	—N/a	—N/a
August 27, 2000	Atlanta	United States	Philips Arena	—N/a	—N/a
September 7, 2000	Hampton	United States	Hampton Coliseum	—N/a	—N/a
September 8, 2000	Charlotte	United States	Charlotte Coliseum	15,271 / 15,271	$656,175
September 9, 2000	Nashville	United States	Gaylord Entertainment Center	15,285 / 15,285	$692,630
September 10, 2000	Birmingham	United States	BJCC Arena	—N/a	—N/a
September 14, 2000	Richmond	United States	Richmond Coliseum	—N/a	—N/a
September 15, 2000	Raleigh	United States	Raleigh Entertainment & Sports Arena	—N/a	—N/a
September 16, 2000	Roanoke	United States	Roanoke Civic Center	—N/a	—N/a
September 17, 2000	Nashville	United States	Gaylord Entertainment Center	—N/a	—N/a
September 28, 2000	Sunrise	United States	National Car Rental Center	—N/a	—N/a
September 29, 2000	Tampa	United States	Ice Palace	13,480 / 16,286	$646,540
September 30, 2000	Orlando	United States	TD Waterhouse Centre	—N/a	—N/a
October 1, 2000	Jacksonville	United States	Jacksonville Veterans Memorial Coliseum	—N/a	—N/a
October 6, 2000	Moline	United States	MARK of the Quad Cities	—N/a	—N/a
October 7, 2000	Ames	United States	Hilton Coliseum	11,521 / 11,521	$546,939
October 8, 2000	Lincoln	United States	Bob Devaney Sports Center	—N/a	—N/a
October 10, 2000	Valley Center	United States	Britt Brown Arena	—N/a	—N/a
October 12, 2000	Columbus	United States	Value City Arena	—N/a	—N/a
October 13, 2000	University Park	United States	Bryce Jordan Center	—N/a	—N/a
October 14, 2000	Philadelphia	United States	First Union Spectrum	13,645 / 13,645	$648,826
October 15, 2000	Pittsburgh	United States	Mellon Arena	—N/a	—N/a
October 19, 2000	Cincinnati	United States	Firstar Center	—N/a	—N/a
October 20, 2000	Knoxville	United States	Thompson–Boling Arena	14,647 / 14,647	$611,929
October 21, 2000	Charleston	United States	Charleston Civic Center	—N/a	—N/a
October 22, 2000	Indianapolis	United States	Conseco Fieldhouse	14,698 / 14,698	$666,817
October 26, 2000	Champaign	United States	Assembly Hall	—N/a	—N/a
October 27, 2000	St. Louis	United States	Savvis Center	—N/a	—N/a
October 28, 2000	Memphis	United States	Pyramid Arena	—N/a	—N/a
October 29, 2000	New Orleans	United States	New Orleans Arena	—N/a	—N/a
November 9, 2000	Lexington	United States	Rupp Arena	—N/a	—N/a
November 10, 2000	Cleveland	United States	Gund Arena	16,639 / 16,639	$794,331
November 12, 2000	Chicago	United States	United Center	—N/a	—N/a
November 13, 2000	Saint Paul	United States	Xcel Energy Center	—N/a	—N/a
November 16, 2000	Manhattan	United States	Bramlage Coliseum	—N/a	—N/a
November 17, 2000	Denver	United States	Pepsi Center	—N/a	—N/a
November 19, 2000	Phoenix	United States	America West Arena	—N/a	—N/a
November 20, 2000	San Diego	United States	Cox Arena at Aztec Bowl	—N/a	—N/a
November 21, 2000	Los Angeles	United States	Staples Center	—N/a	—N/a
November 26, 2000	Oakland	United States	The Arena in Oakland	—N/a	—N/a
November 27, 2000	Bakersfield	United States	Bakersfield Centennial Garden	—N/a	—N/a
November 30, 2000	San Antonio	United States	Alamodome	15,152 / 15,152	$673,706
December 1, 2000	Houston	United States	Compaq Center	—N/a	—N/a
December 2, 2000	College Station	United States	Reed Arena	9,872 / 9,872	$365,264
December 3, 2000	Fort Worth	United States	Tarrant County Convention Center Arena	12,268 / 12,268	$587,489

Cancellations and rescheduled shows

June 12, 2000	Nashville, Tennessee	Tennessee State Fairgrounds	Cancelled. Concert was originally a part of the Fan Fair
August 19, 2000	Toronto	Air Canada Centre	Rescheduled to August 20, 2000
August 20, 2000	Grand Rapids, Michigan	Van Andel Arena	Cancelled
August 24, 2000	Philadelphia	First Union Center	Cancelled
September 9, 2000	Greenville, South Carolina	BI-LO Center	Cancelled
October 23, 2000	Evansville, Indiana	Roberts Municipal Stadium	Cancelled
