= The Chicks Tour =

2022–2023 concert tour by the Chicks

The Chicks Tour / 2023 World Tour
- Tour by The Chicks
- Tour poster for the 2023 World Tour
- Location: North America, Europe, Oceania
- Start date: June 14, 2022
- End date: October 30, 2023
- Legs: 4
- No. of shows: 67 in North America; 11 in Europe; 9 in Oceania; 95 in total

The Chicks concert chronology
- DCX MMXVI World Tour
  (2016–17)
- The Chicks Tour
  (2022–23)
- The Chicks: Six Nights in Vegas
  (2023)
The Chicks: Six Nights in Vegas (2023)	The Chicks World Tour 2023 (2022–23)	...

The Chicks Tour / 2023 World Tour was the sixth headlining concert tour from American country music trio The Chicks and the first since their name change in June 2020. It began on June 14, 2022, in Maryland Heights, Missouri and initially concluded in Austin, Texas. Following this, the group played their first ever Las Vegas residency, The Chicks: Six Nights in Vegas in May 2023, at the Zappos Theater. The 2023 portion of the tour began on June 20, 2023, in Oslo, Norway and finished on October 30, 2023, in Christchurch, New Zealand.

== Background ==
The first leg of the tour was announced on February 28, 2022. In February 2023, The Chicks announced the second leg of the tour, rebranded as The Chicks World Tour 2023. Australian and New Zealand dates were announced on April 30, 2023.

== Show synopsis ==
The show begins with music from female bands playing across the venue, then The Chicks emerge from the back of the stage. They start off with their 1999 single, "Sin Wagon" (or Gaslighter in some shows). The graphics on the video boards are used throughout the show. They depict from featuring the five Supreme Court judges who voted to overturn Roe v. Wade, protests, marches, etc. They play mostly their past hits along with a few from their 2020 album Gaslighter. The show ends with "Goodbye Earl".

Natalie Maines' son, Slade and Martie Maguire's daughter, Eva are members of their backing band.

== Critical reception ==
Sorena Dadgar of CLTure attended the Raleigh show and said, "The Chicks's return to the limelight felt seamless; songs from the group's latest album drew just as much of a response as their most popular albums Fly and Wide Open Spaces from the late '90s." SFGATE's Gabe Lehman who attend the Mountain View show praised lead singer Natalie Maines' (who had been a brief vocal rest) vocals. He said, "Maines is like a veteran pitcher who can no longer throw 100 mph for an entire game but still can bring the heat for a high-leverage strikeout." The Guardian's Betsy Reed gave the Cardiff show four out of five stars. Reed wrote, "Maines sells each kiss-off with glee, throwing up middle fingers and threatening to stomp a hole in the stage, while Julianna Calm Down is a marvel of melody and lyrical sleight of hand carried off with cut-glass interplay." Writing for The Mancunion, Jay Darcy who went to Manchester show said, "The Chicks are all middle-aged mothers now but they have not lost their edge; they're three of the coolest moms out there. They're multi-instrumentalist masters of country, with gorgeous voices and pretty faces to match."

== Opening acts ==
- Patty Griffin (United States, Canada)
- Jenny Lewis (United States)
- Maren Morris (Europe, Canada)
- Ben Harper (United States)
- Wild Rivers (United States)
- Elle King (Oceania)

== Setlist ==
This set list is representative of the show on June 14, 2022, at Hollywood Casino Amphitheatre in Maryland Heights, Missouri. It is not representative of all concerts for the duration of the tour.

1. "Sin Wagon"
2. "Gaslighter"
3. "Texas Man"
4. "Julianna Calm Down"
5. "The Long Way Around"
6. "Hope It's Something Good"
7. "Sleep at Night"
8. "Truth #2"
9. "Wide Open Spaces"
10. "Tights on My Boat"
11. "Lubbock or Leave It"
12. "Long Time Gone" (contained elements of "Daddy Lessons")
13. "Cowboy Take Me Away"
14. "Landslide
15. "Don't Let Me Die in Florida" (occasionally performed with Patty Griffin)
16. "March March"
17. "For Her"
18. "White Trash Wedding"
19. "Everybody Loves You"
20. "Young Man"
21. "Not Ready to Make Nice "
22. "Goodbye Earl"

Notes

- For the shows in Tinley Park, Holmdel and Camden "Travelin' Soldier" was performed in place of "Truth #2"
- For the first show in Toronto and the shows in Syracuse, Hartford, Wantagh, Charlotte, the second show in Morrison and Boise, "Ready to Run" was performed in place of "Truth #2"
- For the shows in Cleveland, Bristow, the first show in Los Angeles and the first show in Denver "Give It Up or Let Me Go" was performed in place of "Truth #2"
- For the shows in Chula Vista and George, "There's Your Trouble" was performed in place of "Truth #2".
- In Mountain View, "Mississippi" was performed in place of "Truth #2"
- Beginning with the show in Hartford, "Set Me Free" was sometimes performed in place of "Young Man"
- Hope It's Something Good was not performed in Raleigh.
- Beginning with the show in Bristow, "Travelin' Soldier" was added to the setlist in-between "Not Ready to Make Nice" and "Goodbye Earl" but it was dropped beginning with the show in Chula Vista. It was re-added to the setlist at the first show in Los Angeles. It was not performed in Mountain View, West Valley City, Boise or Bend.
- During the show in George, "Hopelessly Devoted to You" was performed before "Wide Open Spaces" in tribute to Olivia Newton-John, who had died a week prior
- Beginning with the show in Rogers, "Truth #2" replaced "Don't Let Me Die in Florida" and "Travelin' Soldier" was added in-between "Sleep at Night" and "Wide Open Spaces".
- Starting with the European leg of the tour, the show now opens with "Gaslighter" followed by "Sin Wagon"

== Tour dates ==
Date	City	Country	Venue	Opening acts
North America Leg 1
June 14, 2022	Maryland Heights	United States	Hollywood Casino Amphitheatre	Patty Griffin
June 15, 2022	Tinley Park	United States	Hollywood Casino Amphitheatre	Patty Griffin
June 17, 2022	Manchester (Note: The concert on June 17, 2022, was a part of the Bonnaroo Music Festival.)	United States	Great Stage Park	—N/a
June 24, 2022	Toronto	Canada	Budweiser Stage	Patty Griffin
June 25, 2022	Toronto	Canada	Budweiser Stage	Patty Griffin
June 27, 2022	Cuyahoga Falls	United States	Blossom Music Center	Patty Griffin
June 29, 2022	Syracuse	United States	Lakeview Amphitheater	Patty Griffin
June 30, 2022	Hartford	United States	Xfinity Theatre	Patty Griffin
July 2, 2022	Wantagh	United States	Jones Beach Theater	Patty Griffin
July 5, 2022	Mansfield	United States	Xfinity Center	Patty Griffin
July 6, 2022	Holmdel	United States	PNC Bank Arts Center	Patty Griffin
July 8, 2022	Camden	United States	Freedom Mortgage Pavilion	Patty Griffin
July 9, 2022	Bristow	United States	Jiffy Lube Live	Patty Griffin
July 12, 2022	Raleigh	United States	Coastal Credit Union Music Park	Patty Griffin
July 14, 2022	Charlotte	United States	PNC Music Pavilion	Patty Griffin
July 16, 2022	Alpharetta	United States	Ameris Bank Amphitheatre	Patty Griffin
July 23, 2022	Chula Vista	United States	North Island Credit Union Amphitheatre	Jenny Lewis
July 25, 2022	Los Angeles	United States	Greek Theatre	Jenny Lewis
July 26, 2022	Los Angeles	United States	Greek Theatre	Jenny Lewis
July 29, 2022	Santa Barbara	United States	Santa Barbara Bowl	Jenny Lewis
July 30, 2022	Mountain View	United States	Shoreline Amphitheatre	Jenny Lewis
August 2, 2022	Morrison	United States	Red Rocks Amphitheatre	Jenny Lewis
August 3, 2022	Morrison	United States	Red Rocks Amphitheatre	Jenny Lewis
August 5, 2022	West Valley City	United States	USANA Amphitheatre	Patty Griffin
August 6, 2022	Boise	United States	Ford Idaho Center	Patty Griffin
August 9, 2022	Bend	United States	Hayden Homes Amphitheater	Patty Griffin
August 10, 2022	Bend	United States	Hayden Homes Amphitheater	Patty Griffin
August 13, 2022	George	United States	The Gorge Amphitheatre	Patty Griffin
September 28, 2022	Clarkston	United States	Pine Knob Music Center	Patty Griffin
September 30, 2022	Noblesville	United States	Ruoff Music Center	Patty Griffin
October 2, 2022	Cincinnati	United States	Riverbend Music Center	Patty Griffin
October 4, 2022	Rogers	United States	Walmart Arkansas Music Pavilion	Patty Griffin
October 5, 2022	Oklahoma City	United States	Zoo Amphitheater	Patty Griffin
October 7, 2022	Austin (Note: The concert on October 7, 2022, was a part of Austin City Limits Music Festival.)	United States	Zilker Park	—N/a
October 8, 2022	The Woodlands	United States	Cynthia Woods Mitchell Pavilion	Patty Griffin
October 10, 2022	Irving	United States	Toyota Music Factory	Patty Griffin
October 11, 2022	Irving	United States	Toyota Music Factory	Patty Griffin
October 14, 2022	Austin (Note: The concert on October 14, 2022, was a part of Austin City Limits Music Festival.)	United States	Zilker Park	—N/a
Europe
June 20, 2023	Oslo	Norway	Oslo Spektrum	Maren Morris
June 21, 2023	Stockholm	Sweden	Avicii Arena	Maren Morris
June 23, 2023	Amsterdam	Netherlands	Ziggo Dome	Maren Morris
June 25, 2023 (Note: The concert on June 25, 2023, was part of Glastonbury Festival)	Pilton	England	Worthy Farm	—N/a
June 27, 2023	Cardiff	Wales	Cardiff Castle	Maren Morris
June 28, 2023	Glasgow	Scotland	OVO Arena	Maren Morris
June 30, 2023	Dublin	Ireland	3Arena	Maren Morris
July 2, 2023	Birmingham	England	Utilita Arena Birmingham	Maren Morris
July 4, 2023	Manchester	England	AO Arena	Maren Morris
July 6, 2023 (Note: The concert on July 6, 2023, was part of BST Hyde Park)	London	England	Hyde Park	—N/a
July 8, 2023 (Note: The concert on July 8, 2023, was part of BST Hyde Park)	London	England	Hyde Park	—N/a
North America Leg 2
July 21, 2023	Tulsa	United States	BOK Center	Wild Rivers
July 22, 2023	North Little Rock	United States	Simmons Bank Arena	Wild Rivers
July 25, 2023	Louisville	United States	KFC Yum! Center	Wild Rivers
August 3, 2023 Canceled	Bethel	United States	Bethel Woods Center for the Arts	Wild Rivers
August 5, 2023	Gilford	United States	Bank of New Hampshire Pavilion	Wild Rivers
August 6, 2023	Saratoga Springs	United States	Saratoga Performing Arts Center	Wild Rivers
August 8, 2023	Greensboro	United States	Greensboro Coliseum	Wild Rivers
August 10, 2023	Hershey	United States	Hersheypark Stadium	Ben Harper
August 11, 2023	Hopewell	United States	CMAC	Ben Harper
August 13, 2023	Bangor	United States	Maine Savings Amphitheater	Ben Harper
August 16, 2023	Columbus	United States	Nationwide Arena	Ben Harper
August 17, 2023	Grand Rapids	United States	Van Andel Arena	Ben Harper
August 19, 2023 (Note: The concert on August 19, 2023, was part of the Iowa State Fair.)	Des Moines	United States	Iowa State Fairgrounds	Ben Harper
August 25, 2023 (Note: The concert on August 25, 2023, was part of the Minnesota State Fair.)	Falcon Heights	United States	Minnesota State Fair	Wild Rivers
August 26, 2023	Madison	United States	Kohl Center	Ben Harper
August 29, 2023	Kansas City	United States	T-Mobile Center	Ben Harper
August 30, 2023	Omaha	United States	CHI Health Center	Ben Harper
September 1, 2023	Sioux Falls	United States	Denny Sanford Premier Center	Ben Harper
September 5, 2023	Vancouver	Canada	Rogers Arena	Maren Morris
September 7, 2023	Calgary	Canada	Scotiabank Saddledome	Maren Morris
September 8, 2023	Edmonton	Canada	Rogers Place	Maren Morris
September 10, 2023	Saskatoon	Canada	SaskTel Centre	Maren Morris
September 12, 2023	Winnipeg	Canada	Canada Life Centre	Maren Morris
September 15, 2023	Ottawa	Canada	Canadian Tire Centre	Maren Morris
September 16, 2023	London	Canada	Budweiser Gardens	Maren Morris
September 18, 2023	Toronto	Canada	Scotiabank Arena	Maren Morris
September 20, 2023	Columbia	United States	Merriweather Post Pavilion	Wild Rivers
September 21, 2023	Knoxville	United States	Thompson-Boling Arena	Wild Rivers
September 23, 2023	Nashville	United States	Bridgestone Arena	Wild Rivers
Oceania
October 12, 2023	Adelaide	Australia	Adelaide Entertainment Centre	Elle King
October 14, 2023	Geelong	Australia	Mt Duneed Estate	Elle King
October 16, 2023	Melbourne	Australia	Rod Laver Arena	Elle King
October 19, 2023	Sydney	Australia	Qudos Bank Arena	Elle King
October 21, 2023	Hunter Valley	Australia	Bimbadgen	Elle King
October 22, 2023	Mount Cotton	Australia	Sirromet Wines	Elle King
October 24, 2023	Brisbane	Australia	Brisbane Entertainment Centre	Elle King
October 28, 2023	Auckland	New Zealand	Spark Arena	Elle King
October 30, 2023	Christchurch	New Zealand	Christchurch Arena	Elle King

=== Reschedules and canceled dates ===
The Chicks had to postpone three shows when lead singer Natalie Maines was placed on vocal rest by doctors following her stopping their show in Noblesville after half an hour. Five of their 2023 shows were postponed or canceled due to illness in the band.

- The June 22, 2022, show in Clarkston was rescheduled to September 28.
- The June 19, 2022, show in Noblesville was rescheduled to September 30.
- The June 21, 2022, show in Cincinnati was rescheduled to October 2.
- The July 27, 2023, show in Nashville was rescheduled to September 23.
- The July 29, 2023, show in Knoxville was rescheduled to September 21.
- The July 30, 2023, show in Greensboro was rescheduled to August 8.
- The August 2, 2023, show in Columbia, was rescheduled to September 20.
- The August 3, 2023, show in Bethel was canceled.
