= List of awards and nominations received by the Chicks =

The Chicks awards and nominations
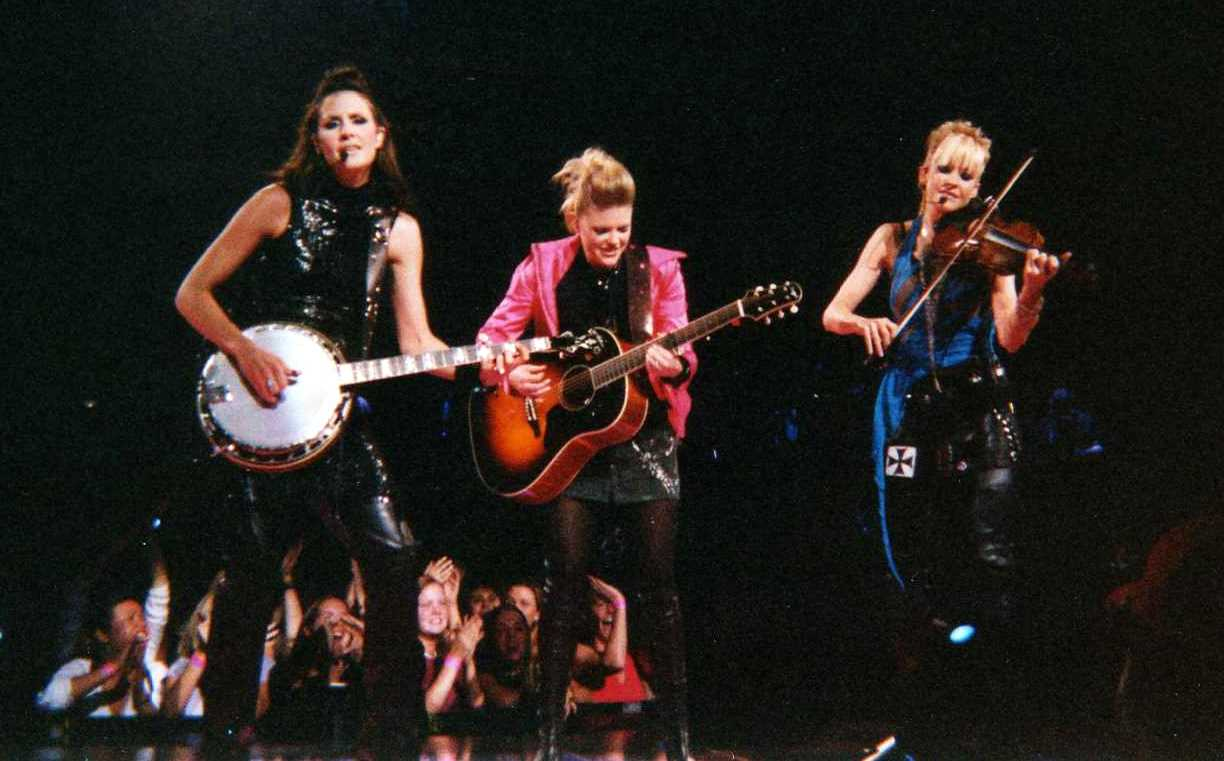
- The Chicks at Madison Square Garden, 2003
Awards and nominations
Award	Wins	Nominations
American Music Awards	4	7
Billboard	7	8
Grammy	13	23
People's Choice	1	1
Academy of Country Music Awards	8	15
Country Music Association Awards	10	17

Totals (Note: Certain award groups do not simply award one winner. They acknowledge several different recipients, have runners-up, and have third place. Since this is a specific recognition and is different from losing an award, runner-up mentions are considered wins in this award tally. For simplification and to avoid errors, each award in this list has been presumed to have had a prior nomination.)
- Wins: 61
- Nominations: 111

This is a list of awards and nominations received by the female American country music trio, the Chicks (formerly known as the Dixie Chicks).

== Academy of Country Music Awards ==
The Academy of Country Music Awards are awards given for outstanding achievement in country music, by the Academy of Country Music. The Dixie Chicks have won eight awards and earned fifteen nominations.

Year	Nominee / work	Award	Result	Ref.
1999	Dixie Chicks	Top New Vocal Duet or Group	Won	
1999	Dixie Chicks	Top Vocal Duo or Group	Won	
1999	Wide Open Spaces	Album of the Year	Won	
2000	Fly	Album of the Year	Won	
2000	Dixie Chicks	Top Vocal Duo or Group of the Year	Won	
2000	Dixie Chicks	Entertainer of the Year	Nominated	
2000	"Ready to Run"	Single Record of the Year	Nominated	
2000	"Ready to Run"	Video of the Year	Nominated	
2001	"Goodbye Earl"	Video of the Year	Won	
2001	Dixie Chicks	Top Vocal Group of the Year	Won	
2001	Dixie Chicks	Entertainer of the Year	Won	
2002	Dixie Chicks	Top Vocal Group of the Year	Nominated	
2003	Dixie Chicks	Top Vocal Group of the Year	Nominated	
2003	Dixie Chicks	Entertainer of the Year	Nominated	
2003	Home	Album of the Year	Nominated	

== American Music Awards ==
The American Music Awards is an annual American music awards show, winners are determined voting by the general public. The Dixie Chicks have won four awards from seven nominations.

Year	Nominee / work	Award	Result	Ref.
1999	Dixie Chicks	Favorite New Country Artist	Won	
1999	Dixie Chicks	Favorite Country Band, Duo or Group	Nominated	
2000	Dixie Chicks	Favorite Country Band, Duo or Group	Nominated	
2000	Fly	Favorite Country Album	Nominated	
2001	Dixie Chicks	Favorite Country Band, Duo or Group	Won	
2003	Dixie Chicks	Favorite Country Band, Duo or Group	Won	
2003	Home	Favorite Country Album	Won	

== Billboard Music Awards ==
The Billboard Music Awards are annual awards based on album and digital songs sales, streaming, radio airplay, touring and social engagement. The Dixie Chicks have won seven awards, with eight nominations.

Year	Nominee / work	Award	Result	Ref.
1999	Dixie Chicks	Country Artist of the Year	Won	
1999	Dixie Chicks	Country Duo/Group of the year	Won	
1999	Dixie Chicks	Country Albums Artist of the Year	Won	
2000	Dixie Chicks	Country Artist of the Year	Won	
2000	Dixie Chicks	Country Duo/Group of the Year	Won	
2000	Dixie Chicks	Country Albums Artist of the Year	Won	
2000	Fly	Country Album of the Year	Won	
2017	Dixie Chicks	Top Country Tour	Nominated	

== Blockbuster Entertainment Awards ==
The Blockbuster Entertainment Awards was an annual awards show held from 1995-2001. The Dixie Chicks won two awards.

Year	Nominee / work	Award	Result	Ref.
2000	Wide Open Spaces	Favorite Duo or Group - Country	Won	
2001	Fly	Favorite Duo or Group - Country	Won	

== British Country Music Association Awards ==
The British Country Music Association holds annual awards to honor the best in country music. The Dixie Chicks have received one nomination.

Year	Nominee / work	Award	Result	Ref.
2016	Dixie Chicks	International Act of the Year	Nominated	

== Canadian Country Music Association Awards ==
The Canadian Country Music Association holds annual awards honoring the best in country music. The Dixie Chicks have won three awards from four nominations.

Year	Nominee / work	Award	Result	Ref.
1999	Wide Open Spaces	Top Selling Album of the Year	Won	
2000	Fly	Top Selling Album of the Year	Won	
2003	Home	Top Selling Album of the Year	Nominated	
2007	Taking The Long Way	Top Selling Album of the Year	Won	

== Country Music Association Awards ==
The Country Music Association Awards are annual awards given for outstanding achievement in country music, and organized by the Country Music Association. The Dixie Chicks have earned seventeen nominations, resulting in ten awards.

Year	Nominee / work	Award	Result	Ref.
1998	Dixie Chicks	Horizon Award	Won	
1998	Dixie Chicks	Vocal Group of the Year	Won	
1999	"Wide Open Spaces"	Single of the Year	Won	
1999	"Wide Open Spaces"	Music Video of the Year	Won	
1999	Dixie Chicks	Vocal Group of the Year	Won	
1999	Dixie Chicks	Entertainer of the Year	Nominated	
2000	Dixie Chicks	Entertainer of the Year	Won	
2000	Dixie Chicks	Vocal Group of the Year	Won	
2000	Fly	Album of the Year	Won	
2000	"Goodbye Earl"	Music Video of the Year	Won	
2000	"Roly Poly" (with Asleep at the Wheel)	Vocal Event of the Year	Nominated	
2001	Dixie Chicks	Entertainer of the Year	Nominated	
2001	Dixie Chicks	Vocal Group of the Year	Nominated	
2002	Dixie Chicks	Vocal Group of the Year	Won	
2003	Dixie Chicks	Vocal Group of the Year	Nominated	
2003	Home	Album of the Year	Nominated	
2007	Dixie Chicks	Vocal Group of the Year	Nominated	

== CMT/TNN Music Awards ==
The CMT Music Awards are a fan voted awards show designed to celebrate the videos and television performances of country music artists. The Dixie Chicks have won five awards from nineteen nominations.

Year	Nominee / work	Award	Result	Ref.
1999	Dixie Chicks	Vocal Band of the Year	Won	
1999	Dixie Chicks	Female Star of Tomorrow	Won	
1999	Wide Open Spaces	Album of the Year	Nominated	
2000	Fly	Album of the Year	Nominated	
2000	"Ready to Run"	Music Video of the Year	Nominated	
2000	Dixie Chicks	Group/Duo of the Year	Won	
2001	Dixie Chicks	Group/Duo of the Year	Won	
2001	Dixie Chicks	Entertainer of the Year	Nominated	
2001	Dixie Chicks	Impact Award	Nominated	
2001	"Goodbye Earl"	Music Video of the Year	Nominated	
2002	Dixie Chicks	Video Visionary Award	Won	
2003	"Long Time Gone"	Video of the Year	Nominated	
2003	"Long Time Gone"	Group/Duo Video of the Year	Nominated	
2003	"Long Time Gone"	Hottest Female Video of the Year	Nominated	
2003	"Long Time Gone"	Fashion Plate Video of the Year	Nominated	
2007	"Not Ready to Make Nice"	Video of the Year	Nominated	
2007	"Not Ready to Make Nice"	Group Video of the Year	Nominated	
2020	"Gaslighter"	Group Video of the Year	Nominated	
2020	"Gaslighter"	Video of the Year	Nominated	

== Critics' Choice Awards ==
The Critics' Choice Awards is an awards show presented annually by the Broadcast Film Critics Association to honor the finest in cinematic achievement. The Dixie Chicks have received one nomination.

Year	Nominee / work	Award	Result	Ref.
2007	"The Neighbor"	Best Song	Nominated	

== Grammy Awards ==
The Grammy Awards are awarded annually by the National Academy of Recording Arts and Sciences. The Dixie Chicks have received thirteen awards from twenty-two nominations.

Year	Nominee / work	Award	Result	Ref.
1999	Dixie Chicks	Best New Artist	Nominated	
1999	Wide Open Spaces	Best Country Album	Won	
1999	"There's Your Trouble"	Best Country Performance by a Duo or Group with Vocal	Won	
2000	Fly	Album of the Year	Nominated	
2000	Fly	Best Country Album	Won	
2000	"Ready to Run"	Best Country Performance by a Duo or Group with Vocal	Won	
2000	"Ready to Run"	Best Country Song (for Martie Seidel)	Nominated	
2000	"Roly Poly" (with Asleep at the Wheel)	Best Country Collaboration with Vocals	Nominated	
2001	"Strong Enough" (with Sheryl Crow)	Best Country Collaboration with Vocals	Nominated	
2001	"Walk Softly" (with Ricky Skaggs)	Best Country Collaboration with Vocals	Nominated	
2003	Home	Album of the Year	Nominated	
2003	Home	Best Country Album	Won	
2003	"Lil' Jack Slade"	Best Country Instrumental Performance	Won	
2003	"Long Time Gone"	Best Country Performance by a Duo or Group with Vocal	Won	
2005	"Top of the World"	Best Country Performance by a Duo or Group with Vocal	Won	
2006	"I Hope"	Best Country Performance by a Duo or Group with Vocal	Nominated	
2006	"I Hope"	Best Country Song	Nominated	
2007	Taking the Long Way	Album of the Year	Won	
2007	Taking the Long Way	Best Country Album	Won	
2007	"Not Ready to Make Nice"	Record of the Year	Won	
2007	"Not Ready to Make Nice"	Song of the Year	Won	
2007	"Not Ready to Make Nice"	Best Country Performance by a Duo or Group with Vocal	Won	

== French Country Music Awards ==
The French Association of Country Music holds annual awards to honor the best in country music. The Dixie Chicks have won one award.

Year	Nominee / work	Award	Result	Ref.
2002	"I Believe In Love"	Best Video	Won	

== Juno Awards ==
The Juno Awards are an annual Canadian awards show organized by the Canadian Academy of Recording Arts and Sciences. The Dixie Chicks have won one award.

Year	Nominee / work	Award	Result	Ref.
2007	Taking the Long Way	International Album of the Year	Won	

== People's Choice Awards ==
The People's Choice Awards are a venue for the American public to honor their favorite actors and actresses, musical performers, television shows, and motion pictures, and is voted on by the general public. The Dixie Chicks have won once.

Year	Nominee / work	Award	Result	Ref.
2002	Dixie Chicks	Favorite Musical Group or Band	Won	

== Radio Music Awards ==
The Radio Music Awards was an annual American award show that honored the year's most successful songs on mainstream radio. The Dixie Chicks won two awards.

Year	Nominee / work	Award	Result	Ref.
1999	Dixie Chicks	Country Artist of the Year	Won	
1999	"Wide Open Spaces"	Country Song of the Year	Won	

== TNN & CMT Country Weekly Music Awards ==
The Nashville Network and Country Weekly Music held awards show in 2000 and 2001, the winners where voted upon by the general public. The Dixie Chicks won twice with seven nominations.

Year	Nominee / work	Award	Result	Ref.
2000	Fly	Album of the Year	Nominated	
2000	"Ready to Run"	Music Video of the Year	Nominated	
2000	Dixie Chicks	Group/Duo of the Year	Won	
2001	Dixie Chicks	Group/Duo of the Year	Won	
2001	Dixie Chicks	Entertainer of the year	Nominated	
2001	Dixie Chicks	Impact Award	Nominated	
2001	"Goodbye Earl"	Music Video of the Year	Nominated	

== TNN/Music City Awards ==
The Nashville Network and the Music City News held an annual awards show from 1990 to 1999, winners were voted upon by general public. The Dixie Chicks won two awards from three nominations.

Year	Nominee / work	Award	Result	Ref.
1999	Dixie Chicks	Vocal Band of the Year	Won	
1999	Dixie Chicks	Female Star of Tomorrow	Won	
1999	Wide Open Spaces	Album of the Year	Nominated	

== Other awards ==
- 1998: Pollstar Concert Industry Awards, Best New Artist Tour
- 1999: Entertainment Weekly, The Entertainers '99, #11
- 2003: People for the American Way Foundation, Defenders of Democracy Award
- 2004: MTV's Rock the Vote, Patrick Lippert Award
- 2006: ACLU, Bill of Rights Award
- 2007: Texas Film Hall of Fame, AMD LIVE! Soundtrack Award
