= Accidents & Accusations Tour =

2006 concert tour by the Dixie Chicks

Accidents & Accusations World Tour
- Tour by Dixie Chicks
- Promotional poster for 2006 tour
- Associated album: Taking the Long Way
- Start date: July 21, 2006
- End date: December 5, 2006
- Legs: 3
- No. of shows: 41 in North America; 7 in Australia; 48 Total

Dixie Chicks concert chronology
- Vote for Change (2004); Accidents & Accusations World Tour (2006); Long Time Gone Tour (2013–14)

The Accidents & Accusations World Tour was a concert tour by the Dixie Chicks. It was their first tour where tickets were sold after the scandal which ensued in 2003 when lead singer Natalie Maines publicly criticized President George W. Bush at Shepherd's Bush Empire in London during the Top of the World Tour, leading to intense criticism of the group. The tour was named after the lyrics in the song "Easy Silence" from the album Taking the Long Way, released in May 2006.

== History ==
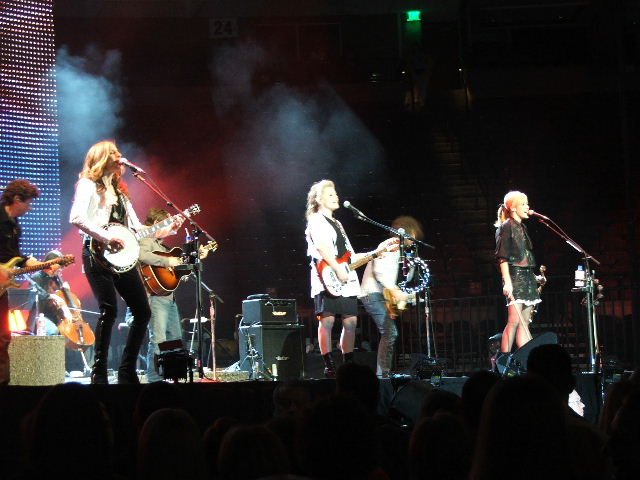
Dixie Chicks performed at Frank Erwin Center on December 4, 2006

The North American leg of the tour was announced on May 18, 2006, for approximately 60 shows to run from late July through early November. While the Chicks' 2003 Top of the World Tour also took place after the Bush controversy, most of the tickets had already been sold beforehand, and it was the top-grossing country tour of that year. Despite good sales figures for the new Taking the Long Way album, however, initial ticket sales for the Accidents & Accusations Tour were far below expectations. Four dates in Memphis, Oklahoma City, Fresno, and Indianapolis were dropped from the tour schedule. In Houston, tickets never went on sale, with the concert promoter noting that local radio stations "wouldn't even accept our advertising money." Arenas holding 15,000 capacity were only selling 5,000–6,000 seats, sometimes less.

Industry observers thought the tour might have to be postponed or at least downsized to smaller venues, as for example Mariah Carey did on her 2003 Charmbracelet World Tour, but in the end the Chicks initially kept on schedule and stayed in arenas. Some Northeastern areas did better, and shows in Canada did best, with an Air Canada Centre show in Toronto selling out almost immediately, resulting in a second show being added and Calgary's Saddledome having two shows as well in Winnipeg at the MTS Centre. Meanwhile, the tour began. The Chicks first performed a quick mini-leg of two concerts in London as part of their promotional activities for the June 12 international release of Taking the Long Way. Indeed, their first concert performance in almost two years (since October 2004's Vote for Change shows) was on June 15 at the Shepherd's Bush Empire, the so-called "scene of the crime" of Maines' remark regarding President Bush. In a show that was broadcast live by MSN and called "Scene of the Crime", Maines said from the stage, "And all week, the only thing people keep asking is, 'What are you gonna say? Do you know what you're gonna say?' As usual I didn't plan anything, but I thought I'd say something brand new and just say, 'Just so you know, we're ashamed the President of the United States is from Texas.'" This was met with thunderous applause and cheers.

The North American leg began as scheduled on July 21, 2006, at Joe Louis Arena in Detroit. The tour itinerary continued to suffer cancellations in the United States, while adding shows in Canada, where the new album and its singles were getting better radio airplay. An early leg show such as the July 25 one in Philadelphia's Wachovia Center, where sales had been reported as strong, still featured ten upper level sections empty and covered with black tarps. However, a show of hands taken by Maines indicated that a third or more of the fans were attending their first Chicks concert, which boded well for the group building a new audience. Continuing the ups and downs of the tour, the August 2 show at Jones Beach Theatre in Wantagh, New York was postponed due to extreme heat and humidity from the 2006 North American heat wave.

On August 4, a revised tour schedule was finally announced. From the original May schedule, 14 shows had now been cancelled due to poor sales, including dates in Kansas City, Houston, St. Louis, Knoxville, Des Moines, Glendale, Arizona, and Sunrise, Florida in addition to those previously mentioned. Several other late summer/early fall dates had been pushed back into later in the fall, including ones in Nashville, Los Angeles, Denver, and Phoenix. Compared to the original schedule, the total number of North American shows was still roughly the same, due to the addition of a large number of shows in Canada (where Taking the Long Way had proved extremely popular, going five-times-platinum); 15 of the 41 North American shows were now scheduled for north of the border, a strikingly high proportion for an American act. (Mariah Carey's concurrent The Adventures of Mimi Tour had also increased its Canadian dates, although not to this extent; her management said the Canadian market was hot and favorable exchange rates made playing there attractive.) Dates were also announced for Australia, where Taking the Long Way had been number one on the country albums for the three months since its release. The rescheduling also supposedly helped make room for promotion of the September 2006 documentary film Dixie Chicks: Shut Up and Sing, which, when released, contained a few behind-the-scenes and on-stage scenes from the beginning of the tour. During interviews for that film, Maines said in reference to the tour, "We’ve basically been playing to about half the audience as on the last tour, but it's a different audience. They just look good ... In the past, I think we always thought, Oh, we have a purpose to entertain them and they were there to absorb that and soak it up and be entertaining. They bought their ticket. Now you feel like they feel they have a purpose, supporting free speech and supporting us."

=== Blogger ===
The Dixie Chicks became the first major band to hire a designated blogger "all-access" to keep up with them in their promotional activities and tour. They partnered with Microsoft and hired Junichi P. Semitsu, a Professor of Law at the University of San Diego, as the first designated blogger ever hired, to write first-hand accounts for their Accidents & Accusations Tour at their MSN website. Having to give Semitsu a title, the band finally decided on Management Assistant, to allow him all-access entry on tour and at home. Slowly, this was laughingly shortened to "Man. Ass.", with Semitsu finding at least as much humor as the Chicks.

== The show ==
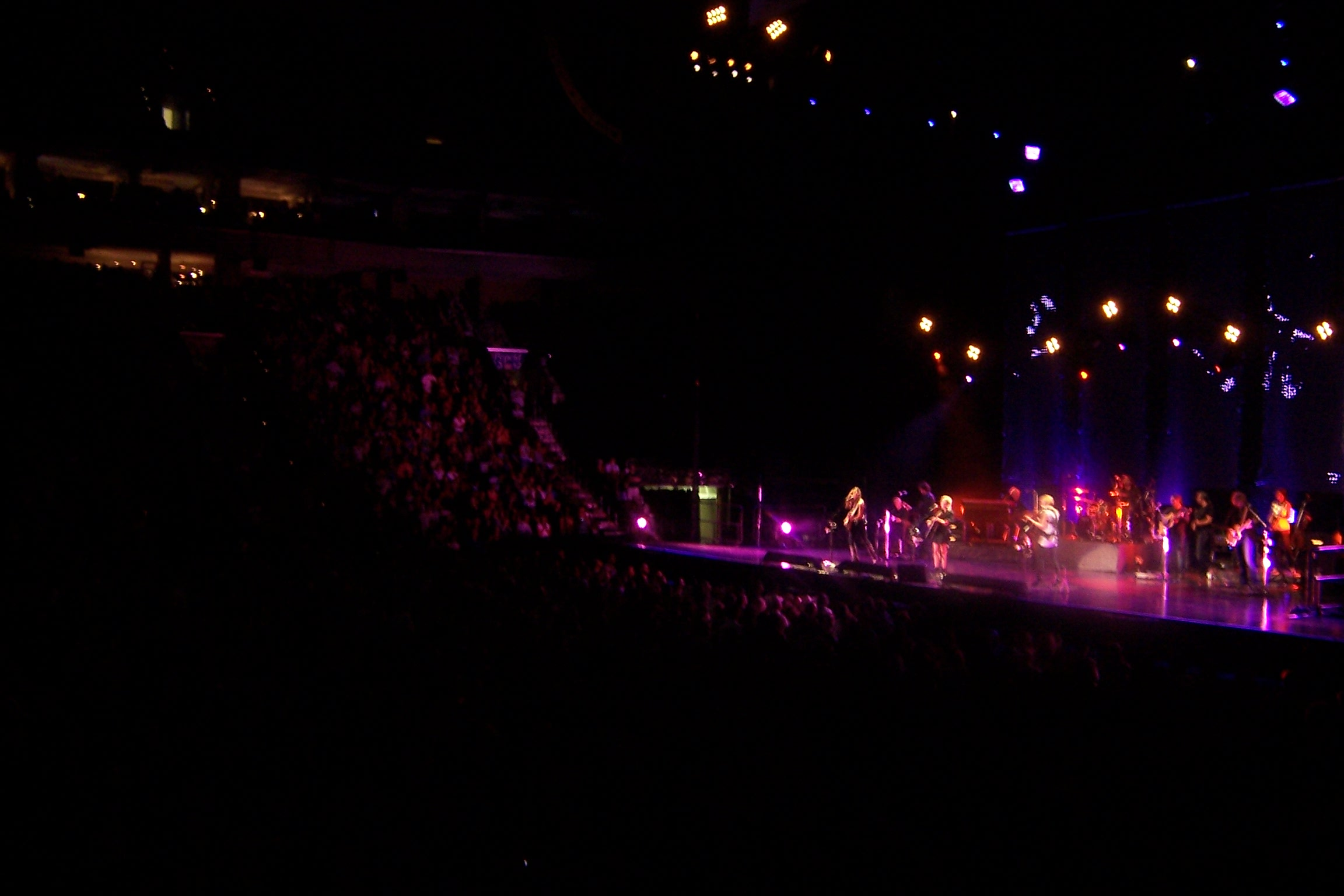
The Dixie Chicks at Wachovia Center, July 25, 2006.

Unlike the Top of the World Tour, where the arena staging had been in the round with the use of an elaborate set and scrims, the Accidents & Accusations Tour featured a conventional arena layout and a bare stage. One video screen was above the stage; in addition, semi-abstract images were projected onto lighted bead curtains behind the stage (somewhat similar to those used on U2's Vertigo Tour but less effective here due to the lack of anything on the other side). Entrance music was subversively chosen to be the militaristic Presidential theme "Hail to the Chief".

Stage patter was kept at a minimum during the Accidents & Accusations Tour, with Chicks Martie Maguire and Emily Robison generally saying nothing at all. Explicit political comments were kept to a minimum; Maines typically alluded to "the incident" only before "Lullaby", where she wryly stressed that in addition to being "mad as hell", they were all loving, affectionate mothers. But the situation is still not far from her mind. At the July 22 show in Pittsburgh, Pennsylvania, Maines lost track of the lyrics to the entrance music, and quipped "I feel like the president. I can't think of what to say." More pointedly, during their first show in Canada, at the Halifax Metro Centre on August 8, Maines said "I gotta tell you, it is nice to be in a country where you're not worried about them spitting in your face."

Maines was a more prominent instrumentalist than before, playing electric guitar, acoustic guitar, Omnichord, and handling the bass guitar duties on "Goodbye Earl". Effective use was made of two-part harmonies, with either Maguire or Robison backing Maines, to give an edgier vocal sound, which would then sometimes be resolved into the expected three-part harmonies.

The set list consisted of mostly material from Taking the Long Way and the prior Home, with a scattering of big hits and concert favorites from before that.

The emotional (and actual) center of the show was clearly "Not Ready to Make Nice", the Chicks' defiant response to the controversy and the death threats they received and first single from Taking the Long Way. It came after two bluegrass rave-ups, the second with Maines offstage resting. The quiet, ominous first notes of the song brought a rush of applause from the audience, Maines delivered the vocals with a focused intensity, the crescendo after the lines about the crazed response to her words brought another visceral audience reaction. The animations that played behind the band recapitulated the black liquid splashes from the music video of Not Ready to Make Nice: the splashing black liquid looked like oil, explosions, and at times even perhaps blood. The song completed on a quiet note again the house lights went partly up as the crowd typically gave very prolonged applause. She then followed this with the respite of "Easy Silence", which precedes it on the album.

Other highlights included a crowd-rousing "Goodbye Earl", "Landslide" with harmonies rearranged into a higher register and giving an almost unworldly feel, a confident "The Long Way Around", a lyrical "Cowboy Take Me Away", and a stunning "Top of the World" with Maguire joining the band's cellist and second violinist to lead an extended string section coda. First encore "Travelin' Soldier" was the only number performed by just the three Chicks, with Maines having her most prominent guitar part.

== Opening acts ==
- Anna Nalick (North America, Summer, select shows)
- Bob Schneider (North America, Summer, select shows)
- Pete Yorn (Australia) (North America, Fall, select shows)

== Setlist ==
1. "Overture" (contains elements of "Hail to the Chief")
2. "Lubbock or Leave It"
3. "Truth No. 2"
4. "Goodbye Earl"
5. "The Long Way Around"
6. "Landslide"
7. "Everybody Knows"
8. "I Like It"
9. "Cowboy Take Me Away"
10. "Lullaby"
11. "White Trash Wedding"
12. "Lil' Jack Slade"
13. "Not Ready To Make Nice"
14. "Easy Silence"
15. "Long Time Gone"
16. "Some Days You Gotta Dance"
17. "So Hard"
18. "Top of the World"
19. "Wide Open Spaces"
20. "Sin Wagon"

Encore

21. "Travelin’ Soldier"
22. "Mississippi"
23. "Ready to Run"

== Tour dates ==
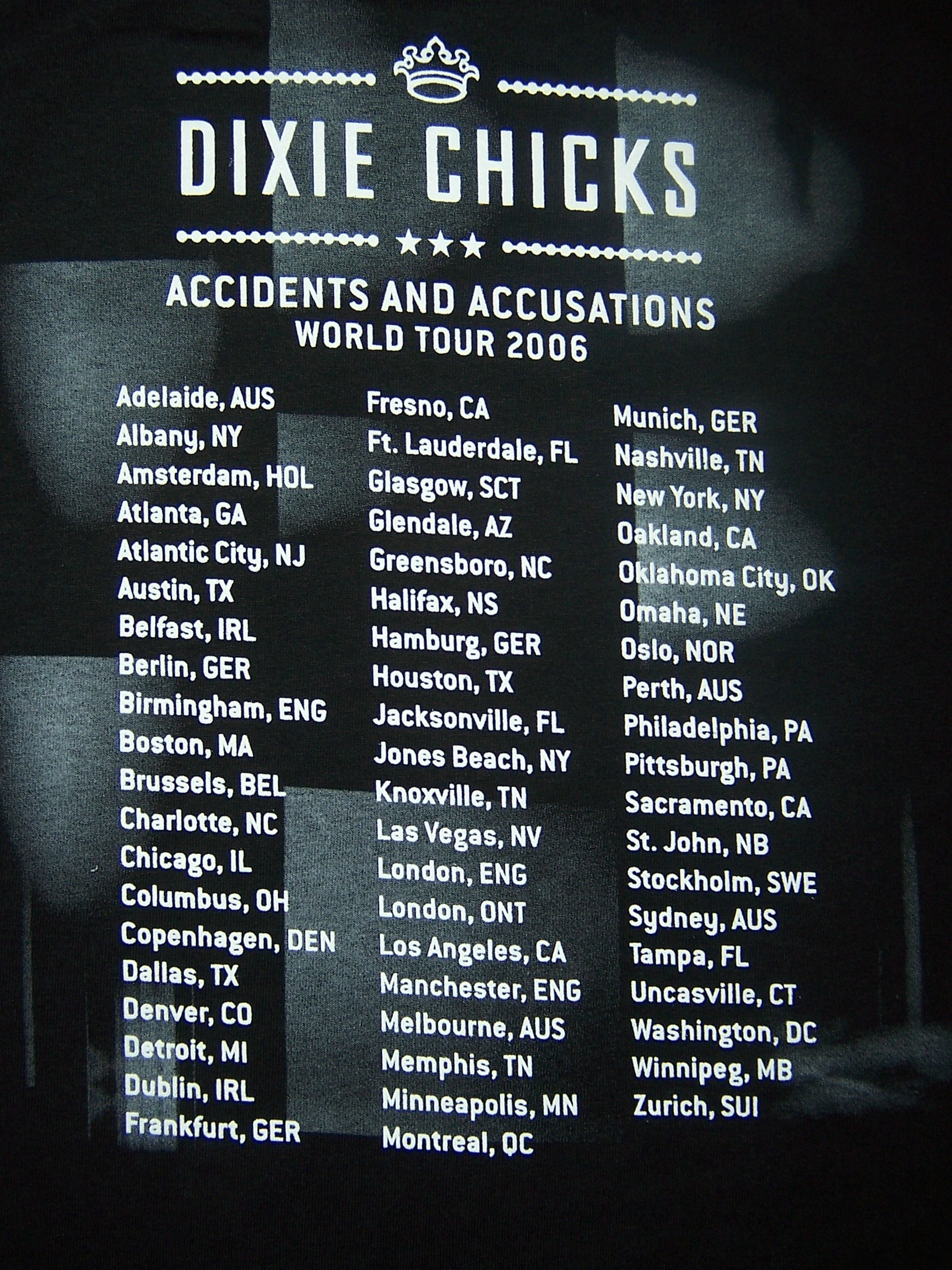
The tour T-shirt shows yet another idea of the itinerary, including never-announced European dates.

Date	City	Country	Venue	Opening Act
North America Leg 1
July 21, 2006	Detroit	United States	Joe Louis Arena	Anna Nalick
July 22, 2006	Pittsburgh	United States	Mellon Arena	Anna Nalick
July 23, 2006	Columbus	United States	Value City Arena	Anna Nalick
July 25, 2006	Philadelphia	United States	Wachovia Center	Anna Nalick
July 26, 2006	Uncasville	United States	Mohegan Sun Arena	Anna Nalick
July 28, 2006	Albany	United States	Pepsi Arena	Anna Nalick
July 29, 2006	Boston	United States	TD Banknorth Garden	Bob Schneider
August 1, 2006	New York City	United States	Madison Square Garden	Bob Schneider
August 4, 2006	Washington, D.C.	United States	Verizon Center	Bob Schneider
August 5, 2006	Atlantic City	United States	Borgata Event Center	Bob Schneider
August 8, 2006	Halifax	Canada	Halifax Metro Centre	Bob Schneider
August 9, 2006	Halifax	Canada	Halifax Metro Centre	Bob Schneider
August 10, 2006	Saint John	Canada	Harbour Station	Bob Schneider
August 12, 2006	Montreal	Canada	Bell Centre	Bob Schneider
August 13, 2006	London, Ontario	Canada	John Labatt Centre	Bob Schneider
August 15, 2006	Chicago	United States	United Center	Bob Schneider
August 18, 2006	Minneapolis	United States	Target Center	Bob Schneider
August 19, 2006	Winnipeg	Canada	MTS Centre	Bob Schneider
August 20, 2006	Winnipeg	Canada	MTS Centre	Bob Schneider
Australia
October 6, 2006	Brisbane	Australia	Brisbane Entertainment Centre	Pete Yorn
October 7, 2006	Brisbane	Australia	Brisbane Entertainment Centre	Pete Yorn
October 9, 2006	Sydney	Australia	Acer Arena	Pete Yorn
October 13, 2006	Perth	Australia	Burswood Dome	Pete Yorn
October 15, 2006	Adelaide	Australia	Adelaide Entertainment Centre	Pete Yorn
October 17, 2006	Melbourne	Australia	Rod Laver Arena	Pete Yorn
October 18, 2006	Melbourne	Australia	Rod Laver Arena	Pete Yorn
North America Leg 2
October 27, 2006	Ottawa	Canada	Scotiabank Place	The Damnwells
October 28, 2006	Toronto	Canada	Air Canada Centre	The Damnwells
October 29, 2006	Toronto	Canada	Air Canada Centre	The Damnwells
November 1, 2006	Regina	Canada	Brandt Centre	The Damnwells
November 2, 2006	Saskatoon	Canada	Credit Union Centre	The Damnwells
November 4, 2006	Edmonton	Canada	Rexall Place	Bob Schneider
November 5, 2006	Calgary	Canada	Pengrowth Saddledome	Bob Schneider
November 6, 2006	Calgary	Canada	Pengrowth Saddledome	Bob Schneider
November 8, 2006	Vancouver	Canada	General Motors Place	Bob Schneider
November 9, 2006	Portland	United States	Rose Garden	Bob Schneider
November 11, 2006	Tacoma	United States	Tacoma Dome	Bob Schneider
November 14, 2006	Sacramento	United States	ARCO Arena	Bob Schneider
November 16, 2006	Fresno	United States	Save Mart Center	Bob Schneider
November 17, 2006	Oakland	United States	Oracle Arena	Bob Schneider
November 19, 2006	Glendale	United States	Glendale Arena	Bob Schneider
November 24, 2006	Los Angeles	United States	Staples Center	Pete Yorn
November 25, 2006	Las Vegas	United States	MGM Grand Garden Arena	Pete Yorn
November 27, 2006	Denver	United States	Pepsi Center	Pete Yorn
November 28, 2006	Omaha	United States	Qwest Center Arena	Pete Yorn
December 1, 2006	Nashville	United States	Gaylord Entertainment Center	Pete Yorn
December 2, 2006	Atlanta	United States	Philips Arena	Pete Yorn
December 4, 2006	Austin	United States	Frank Erwin Center	Pete Yorn
December 5, 2006	Dallas	United States	American Airlines Center	Pete Yorn

Cancellations and rescheduled shows

August 2, 2006	Wantagh	Nikon at Jones Beach Theater	Cancelled due to heatwave.
August 13, 2006	Milwaukee	Bradley Center	Cancelled
August 20, 2006	Kansas City	Kemper Arena	Cancelled
August 22, 2006	St. Louis	Savvis Center	Cancelled
August 23, 2006	Indianapolis	Conseco Fieldhouse	Cancelled
August 24, 2006	Des Moines	Wells Fargo Arena	Cancelled
August 26, 2006	Fargo	Fargodome	Cancelled due to promotional commitments for Shut Up & Sing.
September 3, 2006	Glendale	Glendale Arena	Rescheduled to November 19, 2006
September 6, 2006	Fresno	Save Mart Center	Rescheduled to November 16, 2006
September 8, 2006	Sacramento	ARCO Arena	Rescheduled to November 14, 2006
September 9, 2006	Oakland	Oracle Arena	Rescheduled to November 17, 2006
September 14, 2006	Los Angeles	Staples Center	Rescheduled to November 24, 2006
September 16, 2006	Las Vegas	Mandalay Bay Events Center	Rescheduled to November 25, 2006 and moved to the MGM Grand Garden Arena
September 23, 2006	Omaha	Qwest Center Arena	Rescheduled to November 28, 2006
September 24, 2006	Denver	Pepsi Center	Rescheduled to November 27, 2006
September 26, 2006	Oklahoma City	Ford Center	Cancelled due to slow ticket sales.
September 27, 2006	Memphis	FedExForum	Cancelled due to slow ticket sales.
September 29, 2006	Dallas	American Airlines Center	Rescheduled to December 5 2006
September 30, 2006	Houston	Toyota Center	Cancelled
October 1, 2006	Austin	Frank Erwin Center	Rescheduled to December 4, 2006
October 3, 2006	Nashville	Gaylord Entertainment Center	Rescheduled to December 1, 2006
October 5, 2006	Tampa	St. Pete Times Forum	Cancelled
October 6, 2006	Jacksonville	Jacksonville Veterans Memorial Arena	Cancelled
October 7, 2006	Sunrise	BankAtlantic Center	Cancelled
October 17, 2006	Atlanta	Philips Arena	Rescheduled to December 2, 2006
October 20, 2006	Knoxville	Thompson–Boling Arena	Cancelled
October 22, 2006	Greensboro	Greensboro Coliseum	Cancelled
November 25, 2006	Amsterdam, Netherlands	Heineken Music Hall	Cancelled
November 26, 2006	Brussels, Belgium	Forest National	Cancelled
November 28, 2006	London, England	Royal Albert Hall	Cancelled
November 29, 2006	Manchester, England	Manchester Evening News Arena	Cancelled
November 30, 2006	Birmingham, England	NIA Academy	Cancelled
December 2, 2006	Belfast, Northern Ireland	Odyssey Arena	Cancelled
December 3, 2006	Dublin, Ireland	Point Theatre	Cancelled
December 5, 2006	Glasgow, Scotland	SECC Concert Hall 4	Cancelled
December 9, 2006	Munich, Germany	Zenith	Cancelled
December 10, 2006	Zürich, Switzerland	Hallenstadion	Cancelled
December 11, 2006	Frankfurt, Germany	Jahrhunderthalle	Cancelled
December 13, 2006	Hamburg, Germany	Congress Center Hamburg	Cancelled
December 14, 2006	Berlin, Germany	Max-Schmeling-Halle	Cancelled
December 16, 2006	Oslo, Norway	Oslo Spektrum	Cancelled
December 17, 2006	Copenhagen, Denmark	Forum Copenhagen	Cancelled
December 18, 2006	Stockholm, Sweden	Hovet	Cancelled

== The band ==
- Natalie Maines – lead vocals, acoustic guitar, electric guitar, bass guitar, omnichord, tambourine
- Martie Maguire – fiddle, violin, mandolin, harmony vocals
- Emily Robison – banjo, dobro, acoustic guitar, electric guitar, harmony vocals
- David Grissom – electric guitar, backing vocals, band leader
- Keith Sewell – acoustic guitar, backing vocals?
- Fred Eltringham – drums
- Audley Freed – electric guitar, acoustic guitar, mandolin, backing vocals
- Larry Knechtel – keyboards
- Sebastian Steinberg – bass guitar, backing vocals
- Pete Finney – pedal steel guitar
- John Krovoza – cello
- Janna Jacoby – violin
