= Between Midnight & Hindsight =

Studio album by Joy Lynn White
- Released: 1992
- Genre: Country
- Length: 35:54
- Label: Columbia
- Producer: Blake Chancey; Paul Worley

Joy Lynn White chronology
Between Midnight & Hindsight (1992)	Wild Love (1994)

Between Midnight & Hindsight is the debut album by American singer Joy Lynn White, released October 20, 1992.

== Critical reception ==
Professional ratings
Review scores
Source	Rating
AllMusic	4/5 stars
Chicago Tribune	3/4 stars
Country Universe	4/5 stars

This album received four out of a possible five stars and ranked No. 66 on their 100 Greatest Contemporary Country Albums by Country Universe.

Robert Wooldridge of Country Standard Time writes that "White's impressive vocal skills are in evidence on this impressive debut."

William Ruhlmann of AllMusic says of Ms. White, "She could wring depths of feeling from the plot twists of the tearjerker "Why Do I Feel So Good" and barnstorm through the stomping "Wishful Thinking" with equal effectiveness."

Jack Hurst of the Chicago Tribune reviews the album and writes, "This might seem to be a better album had it begun with its fifth cut, "(If He's So Bad) Why Do I Feel So Good." That one and three that follow it-"Wishful Thinking" (no, not the old one), "Let's Talk About Love Again" and "Hey Hey Mama"-all sound like possible harbingers of a female persona that has not existed on the country scene for some time, if ever. In these songs, young White-whose voice displays vestiges of both Patty Loveless and Emmylou Harris-exhibits a kick and fire that suggest the imminent arrival of a female Dwight Yoakam. Her dominant sound is that of a raucous rebelliousness. The style isn't polished yet, as some of the album's earlier cuts indicate, but it's hard to remember when a country female has dared to be quite this traditional and, at the same time, this bold.

== Track listing ==
No.	Title	Writer(s)	Length
1.	"Little Tears"	Mark Irwin; Michael Henderson	2:21
2.	"True Confessions"	Marty Stuart; Kostas	3:31
3.	"Those Shoes"	Kevin Welch; Harry Stinson	4:13
4.	"Wherever You Are"	Mark Irwin; Michael Henderson	3:22
5.	"Why Do I Feel So Good"	Bobby Braddock	3:14
6.	"Wishful Thinking"	Wally Wilson; Michael Henderson	2:51
7.	"Let's Talk About Love Again"	Wally Wilson; Michael Henderson	2:37
8.	"Bittersweet End"	Joy Lynn White; Sam Hogin; Jim McBride	3:43
9.	"Hey Hey Mama"	Jimmy Davis	3:22
10.	"Cold Day in July"	Richard Leigh	3:59
11.	"It's Amazing"	Joy Lynn White; Ted Lindsay; Johnny Douglas	2:41
Total length:			35:54

- Track information and credits taken from the album's liner notes.
