= Heartbreak Town (song) =

Single by Dixie Chicks

from the album Fly
- Released: June 25, 2001
- Recorded: 1999
- Genre: Country
- Length: 3:53
- Label: Monument
- Songwriter: Darrell Scott
- Producers: Blake Chancey; Paul Worley

Dixie Chicks singles chronology
"If I Fall You're Going Down with Me" (2001)	"Heartbreak Town" (2001)	"Some Days You Gotta Dance" (2001)

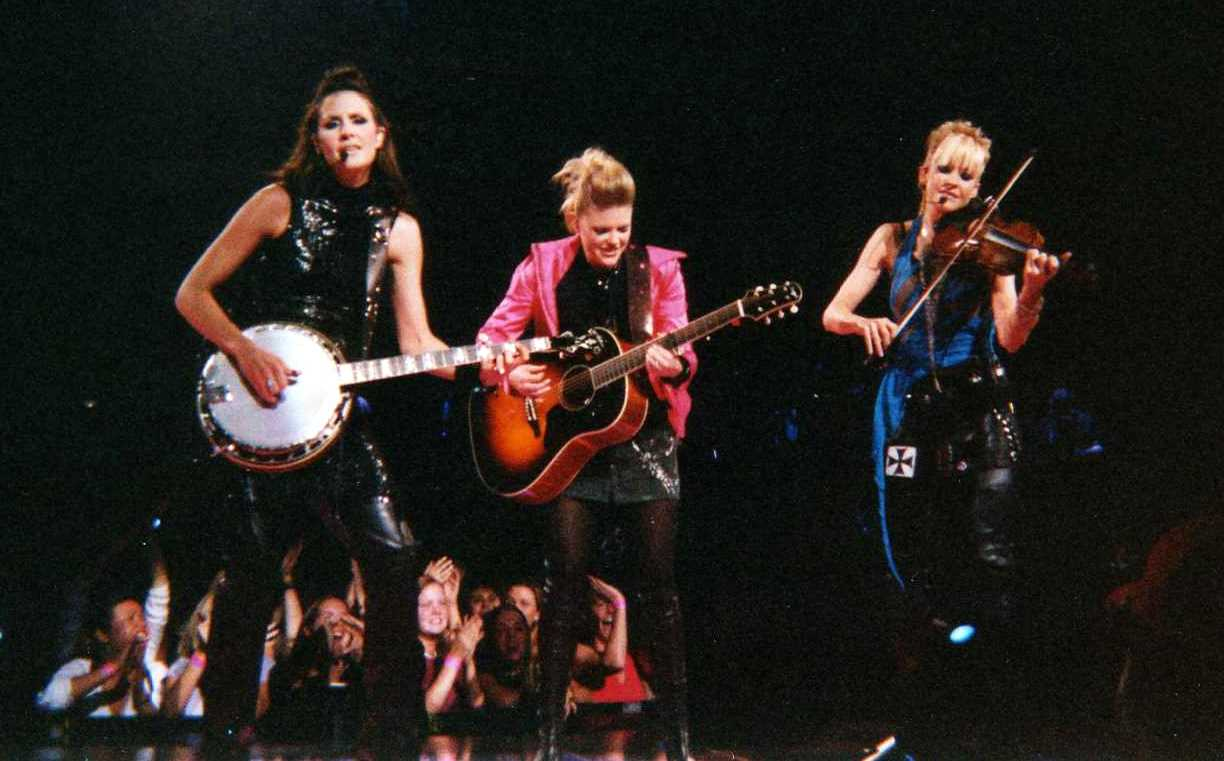
The Dixie Chicks, who recorded the song

"Heartbreak Town" is a song written by Darrell Scott and recorded by American country music group Dixie Chicks. It was released on June 25, 2001, as the seventh single from their second studio album Fly (1999). The song was produced by Blake Chancey and Paul Worley. The song is a country ballad about a family's disappointment upon moving to Nashville.

The song received mostly favorable reviews but became the group's first single to miss the top-twenty on the Billboard Hot Country Singles & Tracks chart, peaking at number 21.

== Content ==
The song tells the story of a young family's disappointment upon moving to Nashville.

== History ==
Darrell Scott wrote and recorded "Heartbreak Town" for his 1997 album Aloha from Nashville.

The song peaked at number 23 on the U.S. country charts. It also reached number 21 on the Bubbling Under Hot 100 Singles. The Dixie Chicks performed the song on their 2001 Fly Tour and it was featured on the 2010 greatest hits album The Essential Dixie Chicks.

Pleased with the song's success, the Dixie Chicks later covered Scott's "Long Time Gone" for their 2002 album Home.

== Chart performance ==
Chart (2001)	Peak position
US Hot Country Songs (Billboard)	23
Bubbling Under Hot 100 Singles	21
