= Wild Rivers (band) =

Canadian folk band

- Origin: Toronto, Ontario, Canada
- Genre: Indie folk
- Years active: 2015–present
- Label: Nettwerk
- Members: Devan Glover; Khalid Yassein; Andrew Oliver
- Website: wildriversmusic.com

Wild Rivers is a Canadian folk band from Toronto, Ontario. It consists of Devan Glover (vocals), Khalid Yassein (vocals and guitar), and Andrew Oliver (guitar and synths). The band released their self-titled debut album in 2016. Their second studio album, Sidelines, was released on February 4, 2022.

== History ==
Wild Rivers was formed at Queen's University in Kingston, Ontario, originally as a two-piece with Devan Glover and Khalid Yassein. On January 18, 2013, Devan and Khalid entered the studio for the first time. The duo attended Oak Recording Studio in downtown Toronto where they recorded their first EP with producer Damon de Szegheo (de Szegheo also engineered and produced the first full length album for Canadian singer / songwriter Serena Ryder). The result of this one day session were songs "No Ribbons", "Sea To Sky", and "Paul Simon". A reimagined recording of the song "Paul Simon" would later appear on their first album as Wild Rivers.

In April 2016, the band released their self-titled debut album. In 2018, the group opened for Donovan Woods in Ottawa and Montreal for his "Both Ways" tour, opened for Australian band The Paper Kites on the North American leg of their tour, and released an EP titled Eighty-Eight.

In 2019, Wild Rivers released the song "I Do". The following year the band released their second EP, Songs To Break Up To, through Nettwerk Music Group. Later in 2020, Wild Rivers released the single "Pink Shades". The group released another single in January 2021 titled "Love Gone Wrong". In June, Wild Rivers released the single "Amsterdam". Their second studio album, Sidelines, was released on February 4, 2022. In March 2022, their single "Thinking 'Bout Love" was certified Gold in Canada. It was certified Platinum in Australia in March 2024.

They received a Juno Award nomination for Breakthrough Group of the Year at the Juno Awards of 2023.

In 2023, they participated in an all-star recording of Serena Ryder's single "What I Wouldn't Do", which was released as a charity single to benefit Kids Help Phone's Feel Out Loud campaign for youth mental health.

They opened for American country music trio The Chicks for select dates on their World Tour in summer 2023. In February 2024, they opened for Noah Kahan during the European leg of his Stick Season (We'll All Be Here Forever) Tour, performing in cities including London, Paris, Berlin, and Amsterdam.

Their 2024 album Never Better received a Juno Award nomination for Adult Alternative Album of the Year at the Juno Awards of 2025.

== Discography ==
=== Studio albums ===
- Wild Rivers (2016, self-released)
- Sidelines (2022, Nettwerk)
- Never Better (2024, Nettwerk)
- Better Now (2024, Nettwerk)

=== EPs ===
- Eighty-Eight (Factor, 2018)
- Songs To Break Up To (2020, Nettwerk)

=== Singles ===
- "Don't" (2023, Nettwerk)
- "Cave" (2024, Nettwerk)
- "Everywhere I Go" (2024, Nettwerk)
- "Anyways, I Love You" (2024, Nettwerk)

== Tours ==
Lead Everywhere We Go Tour

Supporting

- The Chicks World Tour 2023 (2023) (with The Chicks)
- The Stick Season (We’ll All Be Here Forever) Tour (2024) (With Noah Kahan)
