= Joy Lynn White =

American country music singer-songwriter (born 1961)

- Also known as: Joy White
- Born: Joy White; October 2, 1961 (age 64); Bentonville, Arkansas, United States
- Origin: Mishawaka, Indiana
- Genres: Country
- Occupation: singer/songwriter
- Years active: 1992–Present
- Labels: Columbia; Little Dog/Mercury; Thortch

Joy Lynn White (born October 2, 1961) (also known as Joy White) is an American country music singer-songwriter. White was born in Bentonville, Arkansas but raised in Mishawaka, Indiana. Signed to Columbia Records in 1992, she released her debut album Between Midnight & Hindsight that same year. In 1993, she was nominated for Top New Female Vocalist at the Academy of Country Music Awards, along with Martina McBride and Michelle Wright, but lost to Wright. A critical favorite, reviewer Alanna Nash once described White as "a fiery redhead with a wild-and-wounded delivery and an attitude that says she’s not to be ignored." The Dixie Chicks covered both "Cold Day in July" from White's first album and "Tonight the Heartache's on Me" from her Wild Love album.

To commemorate the 30th anniversary of her Wild Love release, White gave a rare interview from her home near Memphis to journalist Joseph Fenity. This was White's first on-camera interview in two decades.

== Discography ==
=== Albums ===
Title	Album details
Between Midnight & Hindsight	Release date: October 20, 1992; Label: Columbia Records
Wild Love	Release date: August 9, 1994; Label: Columbia Records
The Lucky Few	Release date: April 8, 1997; Label: Little Dog/Mercury
One More Time	Release date: October 18, 2005; Label: Thorch Records
On Her Own	Release date: November 1, 2005; Label: self-released

=== Singles ===
Year	Single	Peak chart positions		Album
Year	Single	US Country	CAN Country	Album
1992	"Little Tears"	68	—	Between Midnight & Hindsight (as Joy White)
1993	"True Confessions"	45	70	Between Midnight & Hindsight (as Joy White)
1993	"Cold Day in July"	71	—	Between Midnight & Hindsight (as Joy White)
1994	"Wild Love"	73	—	Wild Love
1994	"Bad Loser"	—	—	Wild Love
"—" denotes releases that did not chart

=== Music videos ===
Year	Video	Director
1992	"Little Tears"	John Lloyd Miller
1993	"True Confessions"	John Lloyd Miller
1993	"Cold Day In July"	John Lloyd Miller
1994	"Wild Love"	Roger Pistole
1994	"Bad Loser"	John Lloyd Miller
1999	"Right Here, Right Now" (with Charlie Major)	Eric Welch

== Awards and nominations ==
Year	Organization	Award	Nominee/Work	Result
1993	Academy of Country Music Awards	Top New Female Vocalist	Joy White	Nominated
