= Sin Wagon =

Song by Dixie Chicks

from the album Fly
- Released: August 31, 1999
- Genre: Country; bluegrass
- Length: 3:37
- Label: Monument
- Songwriters: Natalie Maines; Emily Erwin; Stephony Smith
- Producers: Blake Chancey; Paul Worley

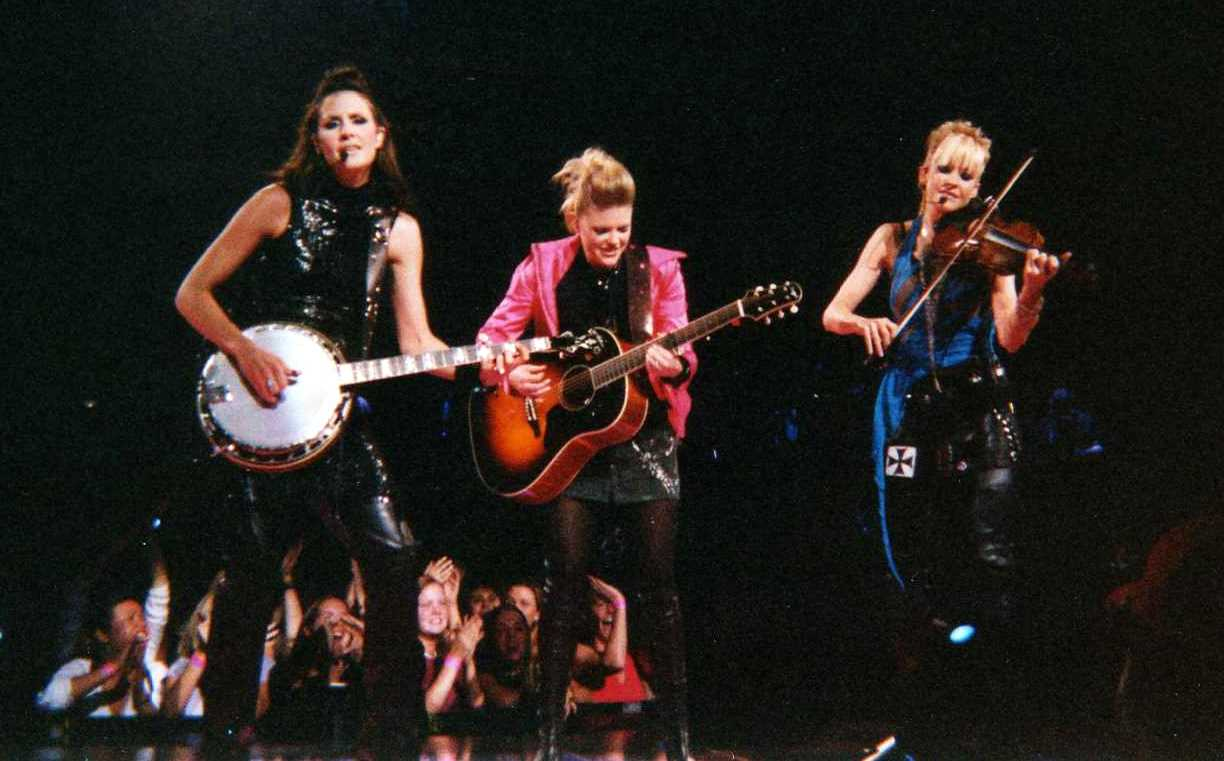
The Dixie Chicks, who recorded the song

"Sin Wagon" is a song written by Natalie Maines, Emily Erwin, and Stephony Smith and recorded by The Chicks for their 1999 album Fly. Though never released as a single, it charted as an album cut. It has been featured in five tours: Fly, Top of the World, Accidents & Accusations, Eagles with Dixie Chicks and the DCX MMXVI World Tour.

== History ==
The song's title was conceived by Dixie Chicks lead singer Natalie Maines. It is a reference to a scene in the 1978 film Grease; after Danny (John Travolta) tries to make a move on Sandy (Olivia Newton-John) at the drive-in, she angrily rebuffs him and calls his car a "sin wagon" as she storms out.

"Sin Wagon" was written "really quickly". The song's message is that "even the most good girl just has that wild side and you got to let it out occasionally," a contrast to country music's "stay-at-home" stereotype.

It was released as a downloadable song in the Rock Band series.

== Controversy ==
According to Maines, Monument Records was "scared to death" about the song's reference to "mattress dancing", and refrained from discussing the subject publicly.

In 2000, the family of Albert E. Brumley filed a $500,000 lawsuit against Sony over the song's sampling of the gospel hymn "I'll Fly Away". The Dixie Chicks have made no comment on the case.

== Critical reception ==
Stephen Thomas Erlewine of Allmusic gave "Sin Wagon" a positive review, calling it "rip-roaring" and "wickedly clever".

== Chart performance ==
Although the song was not an official single, it received sufficient airplay to chart as high as number 52 on Hot Country Songs over a 20-week run. It was one of four songs charted by the Dixie Chicks on the chart dated for September 11, 1999, the others being "Cowboy Take Me Away", "Without You", and "Goodbye Earl", all three of which were eventually released as singles in 2000.

Chart (1999)	Peak position
US Hot Country Songs (Billboard)	52

== Cover versions and parodies ==
- "Sin Wagon" has been performed on American Idol by contestant Amy Adams and country singer Carrie Underwood. On season 3 of The Voice, 2Steel Girls and Gracia Harrison performed the song as part of the Battle Rounds.
- American country music parody artist Cledus T. Judd released a parody of "Sin Wagon" on his album Just Another Day in Parodies, titled "Wife Naggin'".
