= Junichi P. Semitsu =

- Born: Fresno, California, U.S.
- Education: University of California, Berkeley (BA); Stanford Law School (JD)
- Occupation: Professor of Law at University of San Diego

Junichi P. Semitsu (Japanese: 瀬光淳一) is a professor of law at the University of San Diego and the exclusive blogger for The Chicks. He co-created the pop culture and politics blog, Poplicks.com, with Oliver Wang. He also previously served as the Director of June Jordan's Poetry for the People at University of California, Berkeley. He also appeared as a contestant on Who Wants to Be a Millionaire? on January 11 and 14, 2008.

== Biography ==
Junichi P. Semitsu was born in Fresno, California. He grew up in Hanford, California and attended Hanford High School. He received a B.A. in economics from the University of California at Berkeley and a J.D. from Stanford Law School.

Semitsu studied creative writing under Professor June Jordan while a student at the University of California at Berkeley. In 2001, when Professor Jordan went on leave, she nominated Semitsu to direct the Poetry for the People program that she created and to serve as her successor. Semitsu directed the program from 2002 to 2005.

In March 2006, he married poet Dima Hilal in Laguna Beach, California.

== Blogger for the Dixie Chicks ==
Semitsu was hired by MSN and the Dixie Chicks in 2006 to join them on their Accidents & Accusations Tour, their promotional activities for Taking the Long Way, awards show appearances, and for other appearances to write about the experience. Semitsu is effectively the first embedded blogger to follow a band for an extended period of time.

One of Semitsu's more notable entries include how he helped Emily Robison write an apology to Barbara Walters, which was subsequently read on The View. Of the experience, he wrote, "I am supposed to help world-famous rock star Emily Robison write a letter to world-famous television personality Barbara Walters. Suddenly, I have become the ghostwriting mustard softening the beef in between a superstar white bread sandwich. This previous sentence is proof that I should not use any metaphors in the letter."

== Honors ==
Semitsu received the Stanford Law School Marion Rice Kirkwood Moot Court Prize for best brief and best individual oral argument.

While teaching in the African American Studies Department at U.C. Berkeley, he was selected as one of the Heroes among the U.C. Berkeley faculty.

Semitsu was crowned the "Funniest Lawyer in San Diego" in March 2008 when he took first prize in the LAF-OFF (Lawyers Are Funny) stand-up comedy competition at the House of Blues San Diego.
