= Without You (Dixie Chicks song) =

Single by Dixie Chicks

from the album Fly
- Released: August 9, 2000
- Recorded: 1999
- Genre: Country
- Length: 3:31
- Label: Monument
- Songwriters: Natalie Maines; Eric Silver
- Producers: Blake Chancey; Paul Worley

Dixie Chicks singles chronology
"Cold Day in July" (2000)	"Without You" (2000)	"If I Fall You're Going Down with Me" (2001)

"Without You" is a song written by Eric Silver and Natalie Maines, and recorded by American country music group Dixie Chicks. It was released in August 2000 as the fifth single from their album Fly. In January 2001, it hit number one on the U.S. country singles chart. It also reached number 31 on the Billboard Hot 100.

== History ==
Written by lead singer Natalie Maines and country songwriter Eric Silver, "Without You" is on the surface one of the Chicks' more conventional efforts, lacking the "attitude" factor that distinguished them at the time. A ballad that directly speaks of lost love

I thought by now the time,
Would take away these lonely tears.
I hope you're doing fine all alone,
But where do I go from here, 'cause —

Without you, I'm not okay
And without you, I've lost my way
My heart's stuck in second place
Ooo - ooo
Without you ...

It was accompanied by acoustic guitar and soft percussion at the start, adding drums on the chorus, pedal steel guitar into the bridge and a dramatic strings part out of the bridge and into the last chorus, before finishing as it started. The tender melody is sung by Maines without excessive ornamentation, and the harmonies from Emily Robison and Martie Seidel are unobtrusive.

"Without You" was performed on the Chicks' 2000 Fly Tour, but generally not on subsequent tours.

== Music video ==
The music video for "Without You" was one of the Chicks' more startling. Directed by Thom Oliphant and Maines' husband Adrian Pasdar, almost every scene consisted of a nude person against a completely white background, be it the three Chicks (from the shoulders up), a muscular African-American male, a very pregnant woman, another woman, or a baby. Vulnerability was the general tone. In contrast to their more light-hearted early videos from the same album, such as for "Cowboy Take Me Away", here they looked much more serious, with Maines having longer hair and Robison having made her move to dark hair.

The video ends on a tragic note, with a white-on-black inscription reading "Dedicated to the memory of Jackson Miles Ezell Oct. 7 – Oct. 11, 2000". The actress playing the pregnant woman in the video gave birth to a son shortly after the video was filmed, but the boy only lived four days. The Chicks were extremely devastated and offered to re-film a new video, but the mother asked that this one be released so the Chicks added the postscript in remembrance.

== Chart performance ==
Chart (2000–2001)	Peak position
Canada Country Singles (RPM)	8 (Note: "Without You" had not yet peaked when RPM ceased publication in November 2000.)
US Hot Country Songs (Billboard)	1
US Billboard Hot 100	31

=== Year-end charts ===
Chart (2000)	Position
US Country Songs (Billboard)	60

Chart (2001)	Position
US Country Songs (Billboard)	34
