= If I Fall You're Going Down with Me =

Single by Dixie Chicks

from the album Fly
- Released: February 12, 2001
- Recorded: 1999
- Genre: Country
- Length: 3:05
- Label: Monument
- Songwriters: Matraca Berg; Annie Roboff
- Producers: Blake Chancey; Paul Worley

Dixie Chicks singles chronology
"Without You" (2000)	"If I Fall You're Going Down with Me" (2001)	"Heartbreak Town" (2001)

"If I Fall You're Going Down with Me" is a song written by Matraca Berg and Annie Roboff, and recorded by American country music group Dixie Chicks. It was released in February 2001 as the sixth single from their August 1999 album Fly. The song peaked at number 3 on the U.S. country charts. It also reached number 38 on the Billboard Hot 100.

== Chart performance ==
"If I Fall You're Going Down with Me" debuted at number 42 on the U.S. Billboard Hot Country Singles & Tracks for the chart week of February 24, 2001.

Chart (2001)	Peak position
US Hot Country Songs (Billboard)	3
US Billboard Hot 100	38

=== Year-end charts ===
Chart (2001)	Position
US Country Songs (Billboard)	20

== Release history ==
Release dates and format(s) for "If I Fall You're Going Down with Me"
Region	Date	Format(s)	Label(s)	Ref.
United States	February 12, 2001	Country radio	Monument	
