= Cold Day in July =

Single by Dixie Chicks

from the album Fly
- Released: May 8, 2000
- Recorded: 1999
- Genre: Country
- Length: 5:12
- Label: Monument
- Songwriter: Richard Leigh
- Producers: Blake Chancey; Paul Worley

Dixie Chicks singles chronology
"Goodbye Earl" (2000)	"Cold Day in July" (2000)	"Without You" (2000)

"Cold Day in July" is a song written by Richard Leigh and most famously recorded by American country music group Dixie Chicks. Before the Chicks recorded the song, Suzy Bogguss and Joy Lynn White both recorded the song for their albums Voices in the Wind and Between Midnight & Hindsight; Lynn White's version was released as a single in 1993, reaching number 71 on the Hot Country Songs chart.

The Dixie Chicks's version was released on May 8, 2000, to country radio as the fourth single from their fifth studio album and second major label album Fly (1999) by Monument Records. Compared to the previous singles, the song notably has a much darker meaning about a woman's husband leaving her on a "cold day in July".

The song returned the Chicks back to the top ten on the country charts following "Goodbye Earl", which was their first single to miss the top ten. The song peaked at number ten in US country in July 2000 and also went to the number seven peak on the RPM Canadian Country Tracks chart.

== Chart performance ==
=== Joy Lynn White ===
Chart (1993)	Peak position
US Hot Country Songs (Billboard)	71

=== Dixie Chicks ===
Chart (2000)	Peak position
Canada Country Singles (RPM)	7
US Billboard Hot 100	65
US Hot Country Songs (Billboard)	10

==== Year-end charts ====
Chart (2000)	Position
US Country Songs (Billboard)	53

== Release history ==
Release dates and format(s) for "Cold Day in July"
Region	Date	Format(s)	Label(s)	Ref.
United States	May 8, 2000	Country radio	Monument	
