= Ready to Run (song) =

1999 single by Dixie Chicks

Single by Dixie Chicks

from the album Runaway Bride: Music from the Motion Picture and Fly
- B-side: "You Can't Hurry Love"; "Loving Arms"
- Released: June 28, 1999
- Genre: Country
- Length: 3:52
- Label: Monument
- Songwriters: Marcus Hummon; Martie Maguire
- Producers: Paul Worley; Blake Chancey

Dixie Chicks singles chronology
"Tonight the Heartache's on Me" (1999)	"Ready to Run" (1999)	"Cowboy Take Me Away" (1999)

Music video
- "Ready to Run" on YouTube

"Ready to Run" is a song by American country music group Dixie Chicks. It was co-written by the group's fiddler, Martie Seidel (now Martie Maguire) along with Marcus Hummon. It was released in June 1999 as the lead-off single from the band's fifth studio album, Fly (1999), and became their sixth entry on the US Billboard Hot Country Singles & Tracks chart, reaching number two. This song was included on the film soundtrack for Runaway Bride, starring Richard Gere and Julia Roberts.

== Content ==
"Ready to Run" is a moderate up-tempo in the key of G major, with an intro played by fiddle and penny whistle, before electric guitar and banjo join in as well. The song describes a female who is "ready this time"; specifically, that she is "ready to run" away from her wedding because she does not feel that she is ready to fall in love.

== Critical reception ==
The song received positive reviews from critics. Rob Sheffield of Rolling Stone magazine gave the song a favorable mention, saying that it "sets the emotional and musical tone of the album, revving up the guitars to a graceful Celtic motif". In 1999, "Ready to Run" won the Grammy Award for Best Country Performance by a Duo or Group with Vocal. The song has been a staple of the group's concerts, appearing on the 2000 Fly Tour as the show opener, on the 2003 Top of the World Tour near the end of the main set, and on the 2006 Accidents & Accusations Tour as the final encore.

== Music video ==
The music video for the song was a visually comic one that portrayed the Chicks as brides at a triple wedding. Before the ceremony is over, they reveal they are wearing sneakers instead of bridal shoes, and they run away, jumping on the back of a garbage truck and then pedaling away on bicycles. The jilted grooms chase them through the neighborhood, and they all end up back at the wedding site, engaging in a friendly food fight before joining in a circle dance. At the conclusion, the still-unmarried Chicks are seen collapsing to the grass by themselves in exhaustion. The video placed at number 26 on CMT's 2004 ranking of the "100 Greatest Music Videos".

== Track listings ==
UK CD1

1. "Ready to Run" – 3:50
2. "You Can't Hurry Love" – 3:05
3. "Wide Open Spaces" – 3:43

UK CD2

1. "Ready to Run" – 3:50
2. "Loving Arms" – 3:31
3. "I Can Love You Better" – 3:53
4. "Ready to Run" (multimedia)

UK cassette single

1. "Ready to Run" – 3:50
2. "You Can't Hurry Love" – 3:05

European CD1

1. "Ready to Run" – 3:50
2. "Wide Open Spaces" – 3:43

European CD2

1. "Ready to Run" – 3:50
2. "Wide Open Spaces" – 3:43
3. "You Can't Hurry Love" – 3:05

Australian CD single

1. "Ready to Run"
2. "You Can't Hurry Love"
3. "Wide Open Spaces"
4. "Let Him Fly"

== Charts ==
=== Weekly charts ===
Chart (1999)	Peak position
Canada Country Singles (RPM)	3
Scottish Singles Sales (Official Charts)	46
UK Singles (Official Charts)	53
US Billboard Hot 100	39
US Hot Country Songs (Billboard)	2

=== Year-end charts ===
Chart (1999)	Position
Canada Country Tracks (RPM)	18
US Hot Country Singles & Tracks (Billboard)	19

== Certifications ==
Certifications
Region	Certification	Certified units/sales
United States (RIAA)	Gold	500,000^{‡}
^{‡} Sales+streaming figures based on certification alone.

== Release history ==
Region	Date	Format(s)	Label(s)	Ref.
United States	June 28, 1999	Country radio	Monument	
Europe	October 6, 1999	CD single	Epic; Monument	
United Kingdom	October 25, 1999	CD1	Epic	
United Kingdom	November 15, 1999	CD2; cassette	Epic	
United States	December 6, 1999	Adult contemporary; hot adult contemporary radio	Monument	
