= Some Days You Gotta Dance =

Single by Dixie Chicks

from the album Fly
- Released: September 24, 2001
- Recorded: 1999
- Genre: Country
- Length: 2:27
- Label: Monument
- Songwriters: Troy Johnson; Marshall Morgan
- Producers: Blake Chancey; Paul Worley

Dixie Chicks singles chronology
"Heartbreak Town" (2001)	"Some Days You Gotta Dance" (2001)	"Long Time Gone" (2002)

"Some Days You Gotta Dance" is a song written by Troy Johnson and Marshall Morgan, and recorded by American country music group Dixie Chicks. It was released in September 2001 as the eighth and final single from their album Fly. The song peaked at #7 on the Billboard Hot Country Singles & Tracks chart in March 2002. "Some Days You Gotta Dance" was previously recorded by Keith Urban's short-lived band The Ranch, in 1997 on their sole studio album. Urban plays guitar on the Dixie Chicks' rendition.

James Taylor sang the song with the Dixie Chicks during their joint appearances on the 2004 Vote for Change tour, then continued playing it on his own tours and recorded it for his 2008 album Covers.

== Chart performance ==
"Some Days You Gotta Dance" debuted at number 56 on the U.S. Billboard Hot Country Singles & Tracks for the week of September 29, 2001.

Chart (2001–2002)	Peak position
US Hot Country Songs (Billboard)	7
US Billboard Hot 100	55

=== Year-end charts ===
Chart (2002)	Position
US Country Songs (Billboard)	42
