= Fly (Dixie Chicks album) =

- Standard edition cover; limited edition version featured a different background

Studio album by Dixie Chicks
- Released: August 31, 1999
- Recorded: March–June 1999
- Genre: Country
- Length: 48:02
- Label: Monument
- Producers: Blake Chancey; Paul Worley

Dixie Chicks chronology
Wide Open Spaces (1998)	Fly (1999)	Home (2002)

Singles from Fly
- 1. "Ready to Run" Released: June 28, 1999; 2. "Cowboy Take Me Away" Released: November 8, 1999; 3. "Goodbye Earl" Released: February 28, 2000; 4. "Cold Day in July" Released: May 8, 2000; 5. "Without You" Released: August 9, 2000; 6. "If I Fall You're Going Down with Me" Released: February 12, 2001; 7. "Heartbreak Town" Released: June 25, 2001; 8. "Some Days You Gotta Dance" Released: September 24, 2001

Professional ratings
Review scores
Source	Rating
AllMusic	5/5 stars
Christgau's Consumer Guide	(3-star Honorable Mention)
Entertainment Weekly	A−
Houston Chronicle	4/5 stars
Los Angeles Times	3/4 stars
PopMatters	8/10
Q	4/5 stars
Rolling Stone	3.5/5 stars
The Rolling Stone Album Guide	3.5/5 stars

Fly is the second major label studio album (and fifth overall) by American country music band the Dixie Chicks, released on August 31, 1999 through Monument Records. Compared to their previous album and breakthrough Wide Open Spaces (1998), the group had a stronger hand in writing, co-writing five of the fourteen tracks. The album was produced by Blake Chancey and Paul Worley, both of whom had previously produced Wide Open Spaces.

The album was widely praised, even more so than their prior album and has been regarded as one of the best country albums of the 1990s. The album was a massive commercial success for the group, debuting at the top of the Billboard 200 and Top Country Albums with 341,000 copies sold first week, becoming the most successful country album of 2000 and making the group the first ever country group in history to debut at number one on the former chart. The album was also moderately successful internationally, debuting atop the Canadian country albums chart and peaking at number six on the Canadian Albums Chart, while also peaking within the top 40 in the album charts in Australia, Finland, and the United Kingdom.

Eight singles were released from Fly, including the Hot Country Songs number one hits "Cowboy Take Me Away" and "Without You", along with their then-highest charting entry on the Billboard Hot 100, "Goodbye Earl", which peaked at number 19. Other successful hits from the record include country top ten hits "Ready to Run" from the Runaway Bride soundtrack, "Cold Day in July", "If I Fall You're Going Down with Me", and "Some Days You Gotta Dance", with the latter having been originally recorded by The Ranch for their only studio album. Original member Keith Urban plays guitar on the Dixie Chicks's version.

The album earned four Grammy nominations in 2000: Grammy Award for Best Country Duo/Group Performance for "Ready to Run", Best Country Album, Album of the Year, and Best Country Song also for "Ready to Run" and its two writers Marcus Hummon and member Martie Maguire (then Martie Seidel), with the group winning Best Country Duo/Group Performance and Best Country Album.

On June 25, 2002, the album was certified Diamond by the RIAA for selling ten million copies, making the Chicks the only country group to have two diamond albums after Wide Open Spaces. In 2020, the album was ranked at number 224 on Rolling Stone's 500 Greatest Albums of All Time list.

== Commercial performance ==
Fly debuted at number one on both the Billboard 200 and the Top Country Albums chart the week of September 18, 1999, selling 341,000 copies in its debut week, giving the Dixie Chicks the second biggest opening week for any country act in the 90's only behind Garth Brooks and the third overall in any week behind Brooks and LeAnn Rimes. Fly would go on to spend 131 weeks on the former chart, being the group's second consecutive album to spend more than two years on the chart after Wide Open Spaces (1998) spend 134 weeks. Internationally, the album performed decently well. Fly debuted at number six on the Canadian Albums Chart and topped the RPM Canada Country Albums chart. The album was also successful in Australia, debuting the week of September 19, 1999 at its peak position of number 16 and spent eight weeks in total. The album performed poorly in the United Kingdom, where country music already isn't that popular. It debuted on September 11, 1999 at its peak position of number 38 and only spent five weeks on the chart in total. However, Fly performed much better in the UK's country albums chart, where it peaked at number two and would go on to spend 70 weeks in the top ten.

== Track listing ==
No.	Title	Writer(s)	Length
1.	"Ready to Run"	Marcus Hummon; Martie Seidel	3:52
2.	"If I Fall You're Going Down with Me"	Matraca Berg; Annie Roboff	3:05
3.	"Cowboy Take Me Away"	Hummon; Seidel	4:47
4.	"Cold Day in July"	Richard Leigh	5:12
5.	"Goodbye Earl"	Dennis Linde	4:19
6.	"Hello Mr. Heartache"	Mike Henderson; John Hadley	3:49
7.	"Don't Waste Your Heart"	Emily Robison; Natalie Maines	2:49
8.	"Sin Wagon"	Maines; Robison; Stephony Smith	3:37
9.	"Without You"	Maines; Eric Silver	3:32
10.	"Some Days You Gotta Dance"	Troy Johnson; Marshall Morgan	2:27
11.	"Hole in My Head"	Jim Lauderdale; Buddy Miller	3:22
12.	"Heartbreak Town"	Darrell Scott	3:53
13.	"Let Him Fly"	Patty Griffin	3:07
Total length:			48:02

Note Track 13 is unlisted on the back cover and disc, though it is listed as "Ain't No Thang But a Chicken Wang" in the booklet. On some pressings of the CD, "Heartbreak Town" lasts 3:47 on track 12 and fades into track 13, which plays the last six seconds of the song. On other pressings of the CD, track 12 lasts for the full 3:53 seconds, and track 13 contains no audio, only lasting for 0:01. Digital versions of the album remove the blank track completely, bumping "Let Him Fly" up to track 13.

== Personnel ==
Compiled from liner notes.

Dixie Chicks

- Natalie Maines – lead vocals, background vocals, handclapping
- Emily Robison – acoustic guitar, banjo, background vocals, dobro, handclapping, lap steel guitar
- Martie Seidel – fiddle, viola, background vocals

String section on "Without You"

- Strings conducted and arranged by Dennis Burnside.
- Violins – Martie Seidel, Carl Gorodetsky, Pamela Sixfin, Lee Larrison, Connie Ellisor, Alan Umstead, David Davidson, Mary Katherine Van Osdale, David Angell, Janet Askey, Karen Winkelman, Cate Myer, Catherine Umstead
- Violas – Kris Wilkinson, Jim Grosjean, Gary Van Osdale, Monisa Angell
- Cellos – Bob Mason, John Catchings

Additional musicians

- Pat Buchanan – electric guitar
- Blake Chancey – handclapping
- Steve Conn – accordion
- Mike Henderson – electric guitar on "Hole in My Head"
- Marcus Hummon – acoustic guitar on "Ready to Run"
- Dennis Linde – acoustic guitar on "Goodbye Earl"
- Lloyd Maines – steel guitar
- George Marinelli – electric guitar on "Cold Day in July" & "Hello Mr. Heartache"
- Bob Mason – cello
- Terry McMillan – percussion
- John Mock – concertina, bodhrán, tin whistle
- Greg Morrow – drums
- Steve Nathan – Hammond B-3 organ, keyboards
- Michael Rhodes – bass guitar
- Tom Roady – percussion
- Charlie Robison – handclapping
- Matt Rollings – Hammond B-3 organ, keyboards
- Randy Scruggs – acoustic guitar
- Adam Steinberg – acoustic guitar on "Let Him Fly" & "Without You"
- Bryan Sutton – acoustic guitar on "Sin Wagon"
- Keith Urban – electric guitar on "Some Days You Gotta Dance"
- Billy Joe Walker Jr. – acoustic guitar on "Ready to Run" & Without You"
- Paul Worley – acoustic guitar, background vocals
- "Iffy harmony" vocals on "Goodbye Earl" performed by the "Do-Wrongs": Blake Chancey, Paul Worley, Charlie Robison.

Production

- Producers: Blake Chancey, Paul Worley
- Engineers: Tony Castle, Mark Martin, Chris Rowe, Clarke Schleicher, Billy Sherrill
- Assistant engineer: Tony Castle
- Mixing: John Guess, Patrick Murphy
- Mastering: Denny Purcell
- Assistant mastering engineer: Jonathan Russell
- Editing: Tony Castle
- Art direction: Tracy Baskette-Fleaner, Bill Johnson
- Design: Gina R. Binkley
- Photography: Ed Rode, Albert Sanchez
- Photo consultant: Dari Marder
- Stylist: Renee Fowler
- Hair stylists: Jennifer Davis, Alex Dizon, Daniel Erdman, Melanie Shelley, Michael Silva
- Make-up: Debra Ferullo, Stacey Martin, Maital Sabbon
- Cover lettering from Butterfly Alphabet by Kjell Bloch Sandved.

== Charts ==
=== Weekly charts ===
Chart (1999)	Peak position
Canadian Country Albums (RPM)	1
Canadian Top Albums (RPM)	6
US Billboard 200	1
US Top Country Albums (Billboard)	1

=== Year-end charts ===
Chart (1999)	Position
US Billboard 200	52
US Top Country Albums (Billboard)	5
Chart (2000)	Position
Canadian Albums (Nielsen SoundScan)	24
US Billboard 200	11
US Top Country Albums (Billboard)	1
Chart (2001)	Position
Canadian Albums (Nielsen SoundScan)	130
Canadian Country Albums (Nielsen SoundScan)	8
US Billboard 200	42
US Top Country Albums (Billboard)	5
Chart (2002)	Position
Canadian Country Albums (Nielsen SoundScan)	23
US Top Country Albums (Billboard)	39

== Certifications ==
Region	Certification	Certified units/sales
Australia (ARIA)	Platinum	70,000^{^}
Canada (Music Canada)	6× Platinum	600,000^{‡}
United Kingdom (BPI)	Gold	100,000^{‡}
United States (RIAA)	11× Platinum	11,000,000^{‡} / 8,396,000
^{^} Shipments figures based on certification alone.^{‡} Sales+streaming figures based on certification alone.

== Accolades ==
Grammy Awards

Year	Winner	Category
2000	Fly	Best Country Album
2000	"Ready to Run"	Best Country Performance by a Duo or Group With Vocal

== See also ==
- List of best-selling albums in the United States
