= Cowboy Take Me Away =

1999 single by The Chicks

Single by Dixie Chicks

from the album Fly
- B-side: "Goodbye Earl"
- Released: November 8, 1999
- Recorded: 1999
- Genre: Country
- Length: 4:47 (album version); 3:55 (radio version)
- Label: Monument
- Songwriters: Martie Maguire; Marcus Hummon
- Producers: Blake Chancey; Paul Worley

Dixie Chicks singles chronology
"Ready to Run" (1999)	"Cowboy Take Me Away" (1999)	"Goodbye Earl" (2000)

"Cowboy Take Me Away" is a song by American country music group The Chicks, written by Martie Maguire and Marcus Hummon. It was released in November 1999 as the second single from their album Fly. The song's title is derived from a famous slogan used in commercials for Calgon bath and beauty products. It reached number one on the U.S. Billboard Hot Country Singles and Tracks chart in February 2000.

== Content ==
Driven by co-writer Martie Seidel's fiddle, Emily Robison's banjo, and Natalie Maines' vocals, "Cowboy Take Me Away" quickly became one of the trio's signature songs. Maines was praised for a "sincere" vocal that escaped the clichés of "Nashville music-factory tearjerkers". "Cowboy Take Me Away" has become a staple of the Chicks' concert set lists, appearing from the Fly Tour onwards.

== Music video ==
The first scene of the music video for "Cowboy Take Me Away" shows a car stopping on a busy street, with Robison's high hot pink cowboy boot splashing through a puddle, and Maines waiting in a crowded elevator until reaching the top floor of an empty industrial-looking loft, joining the other two Chicks. The three begin singing the song and playing their instruments up there at the building-top in the center of a large city which appears to be Los Angeles. Gradually, the scene around them begins to slowly melt (via various CGI backdrops) of forest floors and snow-covered mountains and the like appear, while the trio dance and sing. The city does not ever disappear entirely, but the point is made.

The filming captured them at the height of their early days, when all three women had hair either naturally or dyed blonde. Looking back, Robison commented, "You have three girls, so automatically you get the roll-the-eyes, you know; it's the band that's been put together," Robison says. "And at the time we were all blonde. And, you know, it was just so – it was so packageable. You know, it was just so easy for people to say, 'Oh, this is something manufactured.'"

== Chart performance ==
=== Weekly charts ===
Chart (1999–2000)	Peak position
Canada Country Singles (RPM)	1
US Billboard Hot 100	27
US Hot Country Songs (Billboard)	1

=== Year-end charts ===
Chart (2000)	Position
US Country Songs (Billboard)	4
US Hot 100 (Billboard)	95

== Certifications ==
Certifications for "Cowboy Take Me Away"
Region	Certification	Certified units/sales
New Zealand (RMNZ)	Platinum	30,000^{‡}
United States (RIAA)	2× Platinum	2,000,000^{‡}
^{‡} Sales+streaming figures based on certification alone.

== Release history ==
List of release dates and formats for "Cowboy Take Me Away"
Region	Date	Format(s)	Label(s)	Ref.
United States	November 8, 1999	Country radio	Monument	

== Cover versions ==
Singer-songwriter Lissie released a stripped-down rendition of the song in 2019 as part of the album When I'm Alone: The Piano Retrospective. In 2020, country singers Cameron Hawthorn and Carly Pearce independently recorded the song as standalone singles, the former accompanying the song with a music video. Indie supergroup Boygenius had performed the song while on tour in 2018 and released a live version through KEXP's YouTube channel in 2019; The Chicks tweeted their praise for the cover in 2021. Pop-country stars Miley Cyrus and Orville Peck performed a duet of the song for Cyrus's 2021 filmed concert special Stand by You, and, in 2022, country singer Brittney Spencer released a cover of the song as part of the single "if i ever get there: a day at blackbird studio". Kelsea Ballerini performed the song on her 2023 HEARTFIRST tour in combination with her song "LOVE IS A COWBOY".
