= Goodbye Earl =

Single by Dixie Chicks

from the album Fly
- B-side: "Stand by Your Man"
- Released: February 28, 2000
- Recorded: 1999
- Genre: Country
- Length: 4:20
- Label: Monument
- Songwriter: Dennis Linde
- Producers: Blake Chancey; Paul Worley

Dixie Chicks singles chronology
"Cowboy Take Me Away" (1999)	"Goodbye Earl" (2000)	"Cold Day in July" (2000)

Music video
- "Goodbye Earl" on YouTube

"Goodbye Earl" is a country murder ballad written by Dennis Linde. Initially recorded by the band Sons of the Desert for an unreleased album in the late 1990s, the song gained fame when it was recorded by Dixie Chicks on their fifth studio album, Fly. After charting from unsolicited airplay in late 1999, the song was released as that album's third single in 2000, peaking at No. 13 on Billboard's Hot Country Singles & Tracks (now Hot Country Songs) charts. The CD single includes a 'B-Side' cover of "Stand By Your Man" by Tammy Wynette. In 2021, it was ranked at No. 469 on Rolling Stone's list of the "500 Greatest Songs of All Time".

== Composition ==
"Goodbye Earl" was written by songwriter Dennis Linde. He plays acoustic guitar on the song, while producers Blake Chancey and Paul Worley, along with Charlie Robison, provide backing vocals. It is composed in the key of C major with a vocal range of G_{3}-C_{5} and a main chord pattern of C-F/C-C-G_{sus}4.

Using black comedy, the song tells the story of two best friends from high school, and what became of them after graduation; while Mary Ann leaves the town where they were raised, Wanda remains behind and settles on marrying a man named "Earl." After suffering from physical abuse by Earl, Wanda files for divorce based on the domestic violence and has a restraining order put against Earl, but he violates the order and severely assaults Wanda, putting her in intensive care. Upon hearing the news, Mary Ann flies in from Atlanta, Georgia, and after a discussion, the women decide "that Earl had to die," doing so by poisoning or drugging his black-eyed peas and dumping his body in a lake, and the song notes that he became a "missing person that nobody missed." The song plot has been described as a cross between the films Fried Green Tomatoes and Thelma and Louise. The character of Earl previously appeared in Linde's composition "Queen of My Double Wide Trailer", recorded by Sammy Kershaw.

== Critical reception ==
In 2014, Rolling Stone ranked the song at #23 on its 200 Greatest Country Songs of All Time ranking.

== Controversy ==
The violent themes of the song caused some radio stations to approach playing the song with caution. According to an April 2000 Los Angeles Times article, at the time of publication, 20 of the 149 country radio stations tracked by Radio & Records were not playing the track due to hesitation from programmers. KRTY in San Jose, California, attracted local media attention for banning the song and holding an on-air discussion on March 13, 2000, about the decision.

The debate also centered, however, around creating awareness of domestic violence issues. Rita Smith, executive director of Denver-based National Coalition Against Domestic Violence argued it fomented necessary public dialogue around a taboo subject. "Many battered women feel trapped and feel that violence is their only option to get away from the abuser," she told the Los Angeles Times. "We don’t want them feeling that way. We want them to know there are resources available to them. . . . We want stations who play the record to tell their listeners that there is a hotline number they can call if they’ve been a victim of violence."

Many stations decided to provide phone numbers to domestic violence hotlines whenever they aired the song. KRTY later reversed their decision and donated to a domestic violence shelter for each broadcast of the song. USA Today reported in April 2000 that KEEY "K102" in Minneapolis played a message promoting a domestic violence shelter alongside the song and WKIX in Raleigh, North Carolina, excluded the song from its playlist.

== Music video ==
Produced by Keeley Gould, the music video for the song begins with some photographs of Wanda (played by Jane Krakowski) and Mary Ann (played by Lauren Holly) in high school, and their parting. The next scene shows Wanda wearing a wedding dress after marrying a man named Earl (played by Dennis Franz). As Wanda is increasingly abused by Earl, she dons dark glasses, long sleeve blouses and makeup, as conveyed in the song's lyrics, to conceal her injuries. Finally, she hires attorney Ezekiel Kincaid (played by the video's director Evan Bernard) to handle her divorce, but Earl appears, abusing Wanda for the last time. Mary Ann hears of Wanda's admission to the intensive care unit, and the two hatch the plan to kill Earl. After poisoning his black-eyed peas, they wrap his corpse up in blue tarp. A few days later, two police officers (played by Adrian Pasdar and Michael DeLuise) arrive, seeking Earl but are unable to find him (after a remarkably half-hearted search). After the seasons change, the two women are shown as business partners with a roadside stand, selling "Tennessee ham and strawberry jam". As they dispose of Earl's body, the whole town, including a zombie Earl, celebrates his death by dancing in a style evoking Michael Jackson's video for "Thriller". The video ends with all except Zombie Earl jumping in the air.

The Chicks and Dennis Franz met backstage at The Rosie O'Donnell Show. They discussed the possibility of Franz appearing in one of their future videos. Told that he would have to play "a nasty guy," Franz's reply was, "Hey, I've done that before." Six months later, however, they asked him to play one of the police officers in the video. He replied, "No, no, no. I want to be Earl." Franz was cast as Earl and Adrian Pasdar played the other policeman instead. Pasdar would later marry the trio's lead singer Natalie Maines in June 2000.

The music video won both the Academy of Country Music and the Country Music Association Video of the Year Awards in 2000. The video was subsequently placed at #6 on CMT's 2004 ranking of the 100 Greatest Music Videos, and #7 on their 2008 revision of the rankings.

== Charts ==
"Goodbye Earl" reached a peak position of number 13 on the Billboard Hot Country Songs chart, a spot somewhat short of the Chicks' usual placings at the time. It also made the Top 20 of the Billboard Hot 100 chart, peaking at number 19, and would become the trio's highest-charting song among pop listings until "Long Time Gone" in the summer of 2002. Regardless of rankings, the song has become one of the Chicks' most well-known tunes, and is a staple that is always acclaimed at concerts.

Chart (2000)	Peak position
Canada Country Singles (RPM)	5
US Billboard Hot 100	19
US Hot Country Songs (Billboard)	13

== Certifications ==
Certifications
Region	Certification	Certified units/sales
United States (RIAA)	Platinum	1,000,000^{‡}
^{‡} Sales+streaming figures based on certification alone.

== Other versions and parodies ==
The song was originally recorded by the country music band Sons of the Desert but not put onto an album, because of a dispute with the band's label. Sons of the Desert had initially planned to record it on their second album for Epic Records, but the Chicks had claimed the song as their own. The resulting dispute over the song led to Sons of the Desert's exiting Epic in 1998.

In 2000, American songwriter and music publisher Dennis Morgan wrote a parody song entitled "Hey Girls...This Is Earl...I Didn't Die". In the song the girls' attempt to kill Earl only left him with amnesia. He eventually comes back and has them arrested for attempted murder while also turning himself in for what he had done in the past. The song was initially published as a single by Dreamstreet/Morganville and was sung by Paul Craft. It featured a cameo by Ray Stevens, who is occasionally erroneously attributed as the lead singer.

A group called the "Dixie Dicks" recorded a response record, "My Name Is Earl," about another man named Earl, whose wife, after listening to "Goodbye Earl" and Martina McBride's "Independence Day," has falsely accused Earl of domestic violence, leading Earl to fear for his life. The song was featured on MP3.com in 2003.

Kelsea Ballerini stated that her 2022 single "If You Go Down (I'm Goin' Down Too)" from her fourth album Subject to Change was directly inspired by "Goodbye Earl" and the 1991 film Thelma & Louise.

In 2023, Elle Cordova made dystopia sci-fi parody directly inspired by "Goodbye Earl". In the song, Siri and Alexa are bestfriends where they attempt to make offline their mutual nemesis OpenAI's ChatGPT after GPT-4 started replacing them.

== Release history ==
Release dates and format(s) for "Goodbye Earl"
Region	Date	Format(s)	Label(s)	Ref.
United States	February 28, 2000	Country radio	Monument	
