= Long Time Gone =

2002 single by Dixie Chicks

Single by Dixie Chicks

from the album Home
- Released: May 23, 2002
- Genre: Bluegrass
- Length: 4:10
- Label: Columbia Nashville
- Songwriter: Darrell Scott
- Producers: Dixie Chicks; Lloyd Maines

Dixie Chicks singles chronology
"Some Days You Gotta Dance" (2001)	"Long Time Gone" (2002)	"Landslide" (2002)

Music video
- "Long Time Gone" at CMT.com

"Long Time Gone" is a bluegrass song by American musician Darrell Scott, originally recorded by him on his 2000 album Real Time which Scott recorded together with Tim O'Brien. The song was later covered by the American band Dixie Chicks, and served as the lead single and opening track to their 2002 album Home.

== Content ==
The song chronicles a young person's journey away from his family farm to Nashville to become a musician, and eventually back to his hometown, where he settles down to raise a family. The song's last verse criticizes contemporary country music as having no soul, referencing several famous country musicians:

Now they sound tired but they don't sound Haggard / They got money but they don't have Cash / They got Junior but they don't have Hank...

Despite its lyrics resolving to a darker outlook on music, the song has an upbeat bluegrass melody.

== Dixie Chicks version ==
American country music band the Chicks, then known as Dixie Chicks, recorded the song for their 2002 album Home. Released in May 2002 as the lead single, it reached a peak of number 2 on the Billboard Hot Country Songs chart and number 7 on the Billboard Hot 100 chart. Their version won a Grammy Award for Best Country Vocal Performance by a Duo or Group.

The Chicks' version, like the rest of Home, features heavy influence of bluegrass music, with fiddle and banjo, and no drums. The song's sound and message were described by journalist Bill Friskics-Warren as atypical of country music at the time, although group member Martie Maguire said she did not consider the song to be a "statement". Prior to the song's release to radio, the band performed it on the VH1 show Divas Las Vegas on May 23, 2002 and released it to radio that same day.

== Critical reception ==
Chuck Taylor of Billboard reviewed the single favorably, calling it "good old-fashioned country" while praising the use of fiddle and banjo in the production. Kevin John Coyne of Country Universe ranked it as the best song by the Chicks, writing that "It features the same empowered energy of their best hits...but with a sharper edge and a complete refusal to mince words as they slice and dice the contemporary country landscape that they still ruled at the time."

== Charts ==
=== Weekly charts ===
Chart (2002)	Peak position
US Billboard Hot 100	7
US Hot Country Songs (Billboard)	2

==== Year-end charts ====
Chart (2002)	Position
US Billboard Hot 100	97
US Hot Country Singles & Tracks (Billboard)	35
