= Blake Chancey =

- Born: September 11, 1962 (age 63)
- Origin: Nashville, Tennessee, USA
- Genres: Country
- Occupation: Record Producer
- Years active: 1976–present

Blake Chancey (born September 11, 1962) is an American record producer and music business executive, known primarily for his work in country music. Formerly an executive vice president and chief creative officer for Sony Music, he later formed a partnership with artist manager Scott Siman. He is currently the chief creative officer and partner of RPM Music Group in Nashville, Tennessee and one of Nashville's leading record producers.

== Career ==
Chancey is the son of record producer and label executive Ron Chancey, who signed George Strait and Jimmy Buffett, and produced the Oak Ridge Boys and Billy Crash Craddock and Jeris Ross, among others.

Beginning his career as a sound engineer, he first worked with Ricky Nelson, The Allman Brothers Band and Joe Walsh. He later enrolled in the Music Business Program at Middle Tennessee State University where he received a BA in Music Business. Working with Bob Beckham at Combine Music, he worked with writers such as Dennis Linde, Kris Kristofferson, Tony Joe White, Larry Gatlin and Guy Clark. One of his first successes as a producer was the platinum debut album of David Ball.

In the early 1990s, Siman and Paul Worley, who were running Sony Nashville, reached out to Chancey to serve as A&R executive and producer at Sony Records. While at Sony, Chancey worked with and developed The Dixie Chicks, Ricochet, Montgomery Gentry, as well as overseeing the A&R of many other artists on the roster. He went on to produce Waylon Jennings, Billy Ray Cyrus, Little Big Town and Mary Chapin Carpenter and many other Sony artists.

The Dixie Chicks' 1998 album Wide Open Spaces and their 1999 Fly album won Chancey a Grammy Award for Best Country Album. They also earned him two CMA Awards and two ACM Awards, and numerous other nominations.

Since leaving Sony Records, Chancey has worked as an independent producer and publisher, producing records on Montgomery Gentry, Gretchen Wilson, The Lost Trailers, Kellie Pickler, Jeff Bates and others.
