= Dixie Chicks: Shut Up and Sing =

2006 American film by Cecilia Peck, Barbara Kopple

- Theatrical release poster
- Directed by: Barbara Kopple; Cecilia Peck
- Produced by: Barbara Kopple; Cecilia Peck; David Cassidy
- Starring: Martie Maguire; Natalie Maines; Emily Robison; Adrian Pasdar; Rick Rubin; George W. Bush (footage); Simon Renshaw; Gareth Maguire
- Cinematography: Tamara Goldsworthy; Chris Burrill; Joan Churchill; Seth Gordon
- Edited by: Bob Eisenhardt; Aaron Kuhn; Emma Morris; Jean Tsien; Michael Culyba (Co-Editor)
- Music by: Dixie Chicks
- Distributed by: The Weinstein Company
- Release dates: September 12, 2006 (TIFF); October 27, 2006 (United States)
- Running time: 93 minutes
- Country: United States
- Language: English

Dixie Chicks: Shut Up and Sing (also known simply as Shut Up and Sing) is a 2006 American documentary film about the Dixie Chicks controversy, produced and directed by Barbara Kopple and Cecilia Peck.

The film follows the Dixie Chicks, an all-female Texas-based country music trio, over a three-year period of intense public scrutiny, fan backlash, physical threats, and pressure from both corporate and conservative political elements in the United States after lead singer Natalie Maines publicly criticized then President of the United States George W. Bush during a live 2003 concert in London as part of their Top of the World Tour.

== Synopsis ==
The title of the film was inspired by conservative commentator Laura Ingraham, who coined the phrase "shut up and sing" in such context earlier; it was the title of her 2003 book Shut Up & Sing: How Elites from Hollywood, Politics, and the UN Are Subverting America. The tagline of the film, "freedom of speech is fine as long as you don't do it in public", is a reference to a scene in which an interviewed protester says "freedom of speech is fine but by God you don't do it outside of the country and you don't do it in mass publicly".

The film opens during the Dixie Chicks' 2003 Top of the World Tour, discussing the Dixie Chicks' superstar status prior to the incident at their London show. They had sold more albums in the United States than any other female band in history. With the release of their 2002 album Home, they were again at the top of the Billboard charts. The new single from that album "Travelin' Soldier", a sensitive depiction of a soldier's life during the Vietnam War era, and the young woman who waited for him, finding he was killed in battle, had peaked at number 1 on the US Billboard Hot Country Songs Chart.

The film then cuts to a scene from the Dixie Chicks' March 10, 2003 concert at the Shepherd's Bush Empire Theatre in London, England. The atmosphere in the European audience is of dramatic opposition to the announcement from United States President George W. Bush's authorization of the invasion of Iraq. Approximately 1 million people had recently demonstrated in London against the impending war. During the introduction to their song "Travelin' Soldier", Natalie Maines, a Texas native, says:

Just so you know, we’re on the good side with y’all. We do not want this war, this violence, and we’re ashamed that the President of the United States is from Texas.

— Natalie Maines

The Guardian, a major English newspaper, published Maines' statement as simply "Just so you know, we're ashamed the President of the United States is from Texas." Shortly thereafter, the U.S. media picked up the story and controversy erupted. Conservative groups in the U.S. rallied against the Dixie Chicks and a firestorm of anger and criticism followed.

The film shows the band's reaction to the open hostility, political and corporate backlash, and physical threats directed at the group. The band did not expect such a strong reaction, and they are unsure if they should "shut up and sing", apologize, or stand by their convictions and let more sparks fly.

The film follows the day-to-day life of the Chicks. It shows them with their husbands and their children, at home in Texas and in the recording studio in Los Angeles, getting their hair and makeup done before appearances, exchanging ribald remarks with each other, writing song lyrics and working on musical arrangements. Simon Renshaw, the group's longtime manager, is the focus of many scenes as he attempts to guide the Chicks through the vicissitudes of the music industry.

The title of the film is a lyric from the Dixie Chicks' 2006 post-controversy single "Not Ready to Make Nice" from the album Taking the Long Way. It was the criticism and hate mail that they received because of their political statements, one of which drew such concern from both the FBI and the Texas Rangers that they advised the Chicks to cancel a concert in Dallas, Texas, and they were shown the original letter that specified a date, time, and location at which lead singer Natalie Maines would be shot dead, unless she "shut up and sang". However, the show took place without incident. Living in a constant state of fear took an emotional toll on the Chicks, in particular because they toured with their children.

The song, "Not Ready to Make Nice" includes a reference to that very real death threat:

And how in the world can the words that I said
Send somebody so over the edge
That they'd write me a letter
Saying that I better
shut up and sing or my life will be over?

== Cast ==
- Martie Maguire as herself
- Natalie Maines as herself
- Emily Robison as herself
- Adrian Pasdar as himself
- Rick Rubin as himself
- Pat Buchanan as himself (footage)
- Barbara Boxer as herself (footage)
- George W. Bush as himself (footage)
- Anderson Cooper as himself (footage)
- Dan Wilson as himself
- Paul Beane as himself
- Cindi Berger as herself
- Simon Renshaw as himself
- Gareth Maguire as himself

== Release dates ==
- Canada September 12, 2006 (Toronto International Film Festival – world premiere)
- Spain September 21, 2006 (San Sebastián International Film Festival)
- United States September 30, 2006 (Aspen Film Festival)
  - October 15, 2006 (Woodstock Film Festival)
  - October 19, 2006 (Austin Film Festival)
  - October 27, 2006 (limited release)
  - November 10, 2006 (wide release)
- Italy October 17, 2006 (Rome Film Fest)
- United Kingdom October 25, 2006 (London Film Festival)
  - June 29, 2007
- Greece March 16, 2007 (Thessaloniki Documentaries Festival)
  - April 26, 2007 (limited)
- Netherlands March 29, 2007
- Australia June 15, 2007 (Sydney Film Festival)
- Germany August 9, 2007
- South Korea August 11, 2007 (Jecheon International Music & Film Festival)
  - October 3, 2007
- Belgium August 15, 2007

== Television advertisements ==
In October 2006, the film's distributor, The Weinstein Company, announced that NBC had refused to air the TV advertisements for the film, stating that it was following a "policy of not broadcasting ads that deal with issues of public controversy". NBC publicly acknowledged the decision but claimed that it was willing to work with Weinstein to find an acceptable alternative. At the same time, the distributor also claimed that The CW had refused to air these advertisements, citing "concerns we do not have appropriate programming in which to schedule this spot". That network later said its statement was merely an opinion on whether its target audience would respond to the ad, and that it would have accepted the ads if Weinstein had actually bought commercial time.

At the time, CBS was the only major television network to have agreed to air the ads for the film, according to a Weinstein spokesperson, who said the company was also waiting on responses from ABC and Fox. It is not clear which decision either network ultimately made. However, individual stations affiliated with all five networks, including some owned by NBC, aired the ad during local ad time.

== Reception ==
=== Box office ===
The film opened in New York City and Los Angeles on October 27, 2006 in only 4 theatres. In its first week it grossed an average of US$50,103. In its sixth week (38 days after its original release) the film expanded to its widest release, being shown at 84 theaters.

- Total domestic gross: US$1,215,045 (Estimate).

=== Reviews ===
Critical reaction to the film has been positive overall. It currently holds an 89% rating on review aggregator Rotten Tomatoes. The critical consensus reads: "Though ostensibly an intimate look at the Dixie Chicks after their 2003 anti-Bush remark, the film achieves broader relevance by exploring how media, politics, and celebrities intertwine."

Shut Up and Sing has received positive reviews from major American publications such as Rolling Stone, The New Yorker, Entertainment Weekly, Chicago Tribune, Variety, Time, USA Today, The Wall Street Journal, TV Guide, San Francisco Chronicle, Newsweek, LA Weekly and The Washington Post. It was also very well received by Richard Roeper on the television program Ebert & Roeper.

=== Awards and nominations ===
- Aspen Film Festival:
  - Audience Award - Favorite Documentary
- Boston Film Critics:
  - Best Documentary Feature
- Broadcast Film Critics:
  - Best Documentary Feature
  - Best Song ("The Neighbor")
- Chicago International Film Festival:
  - Special Jury Prize
- Online Film Critics:
  - Best Documentary Feature
- San Diego Film Critics:
  - Best Non-Fiction Film
- Southeastern Film Critics:
  - Wyatt Award for the film that best captures the "spirit of the South" (won)
- Woodstock Film Festival:
  - Audience Award - Best Documentary Feature
- Sydney Film Festival:
  - Audience Award - Documentary Category

== Poster ==
Entertainment Weekly magazine cover used in promotional video

Promotional poster used in the US

The theatrical poster of the film borrowed a picture of the band from a memorable Entertainment Weekly cover, in which they are featured in the nude, with their privates cleverly hidden. On the U.S. version of the poster, however, the "nudity" was edited out and towels are seen over their nude bodies. The writings, which were originally on their bodies, were transferred to the towels. The Canadian poster used the original photo, with no towels added.

The original photograph included the words "Dixie Sluts" but for the promotional poster, a more demure "Dixie Bimbos" replaced the message on Emily Robison's arm.

== Rating ==
The documentary received an R rating from the Motion Picture Association of America for strong language.

== DVD release ==
The DVD of the film was released on February 20, 2007, and the UK in September 2007. On September 9, 2007, it ranked at #2 in the UK Top 20 DVD Chart.
