= An Evening with the Dixie Chicks =

- Directed by: Joel Gallen
- Starring: Natalie Maines; Martie Maguire; Emily Robison
- Country of origin: United States
- Original language: English

Production
- Running time: 92 minutes

Original release
- Release: December 10, 2002

An Evening with the Dixie Chicks is a 2002 live music documentary featuring the Dixie Chicks and directed by Joel Gallen. As of March 2003, An Evening with the Dixie Chicks has sold 2 million copies in the United States and has been certified 2× Platinum by the Recording Industry Association of America (RIAA).

== History ==
An Evening was filmed over two nights at Hollywood's Kodak Theatre. The film features songs from the band's albums Home, Fly and Wide Open Spaces. The concerts were scheduled for this filming, as they took place soon before the release of Home but several months before the start of the Top of the World Tour.

== Setlist ==
1. "Long Time Gone"
2. "Landslide"
3. "Travelin' Soldier"
4. "Truth No. 2
5. "White Trash Wedding"
6. "Believe In Love"
7. "Tortured, Tangled Hearts
8. "Lil' Jack Slade"
9. "Godspeed (Sweet Dreams)"
10. "Top of the World"
11. "Wide Open Spaces"
12. "Cowboy Take Me Away"
13. "Goodbye Earl"
14. "Sin Wagon"

== Reviews ==
Dan Macintosh indicates that the film shows "...their love of country roots...with plenty of musical skills to drive this point home."

== Certifications ==
Region	Certification	Certified units/sales
Australia (ARIA)	5× Platinum	75,000^{^}
United States (RIAA)	2× Platinum	200,000^{^}
^{^} Shipments figures based on certification alone.
