= Playlist: The Very Best of Dixie Chicks =

Greatest hits album by Dixie Chicks
- Released: June 1, 2010
- Recorded: 1997–2006
- Genres: Country, bluegrass, country pop, alternative country
- Length: 48:03
- Labels: Legacy, Columbia Nashville

Dixie Chicks chronology
Taking the Long Way (2006)	Playlist: The Very Best of Dixie Chicks (2010)	The Essential Dixie Chicks (2010)

Professional ratings
Review scores
Source	Rating
Allmusic	4/5 stars
Roughstock	3.5/5 stars

Playlist: The Very Best of Dixie Chicks is the greatest hits album from American country band the Dixie Chicks. The album consists of twelve songs personally selected by the Dixie Chicks from their fourth through seventh studio albums. It was released in the United States on June 1, 2010. The group supported the album by touring with the Eagles in 2010. It is a part of Sony BMG's Playlist series. It was also re-released on Sony's midprice sub-label Camden entitled Wide Open Spaces: The Collection in 2012.

== Critical reception ==
Playlist: The Very Best of Dixie Chicks received four stars out of five from Stephen Thomas Erlewine of Allmusic. Erlewine wrote that "the tracks are sharply selected, making for a good, representative compilation if not quite a definitive one." Matt Bjorke of Roughstock gave the compilation three and a half stars out of five, calling it "a great representation of who they are as artists" while adding "it will also have to serve as a placeholder for chicks fans until their label does eventually get around to releasing a career-spanning ‘greatest hits’ record."

== Track listing ==
No.	Title	Writer(s)	Original Album	Length
1.	"Wide Open Spaces"	Susan Gibson	1998 - Wide Open Spaces	3:43
2.	"You Were Mine"	Emily Robison, Martie Maguire	1998 - Wide Open Spaces	3:37
3.	"Sin Wagon"	Natalie Maines, Emily Robison, Stephony Smith	1999 - Fly	3:37
4.	"Cowboy Take Me Away"	Maguire, Marcus Hummon	1999 - Fly	4:47
5.	"Let Him Fly"	Patty Griffin	1999 - Fly	3:08
6.	"Long Time Gone"	Darrell Scott	2002 - Home	4:07
7.	"Landslide"	Stevie Nicks	2002 - Home	3:48
8.	"Truth No. 2"	Griffin	2002 - Home	4:27
9.	"The Long Way Around"	Maguire, Maines, Robison, Dan Wilson	2006 - Taking the Long Way	4:33
10.	"Easy Silence"	Maguire, Maines, Robison, Wilson	2006 - Taking the Long Way	4:02
11.	"Not Ready to Make Nice"	Maguire, Maines, Robison, Wilson	2006 - Taking the Long Way	3:58
12.	"Lubbock or Leave It"	Mike Campbell, Maguire, Maines, Robison	2006 - Taking the Long Way	3:54

== Chart performance ==
Playlist: The Very Best of Dixie Chicks peaked at number 27 on the U.S. Billboard Top Country Albums chart the week of June 19, 2010 and number 115 on the Billboard 200.

Chart (2010)	Peak position
U.S. Billboard Top Country Albums	27
U.S. Billboard 200	115
