= Dixie Chicks comments on George W. Bush =

2003 backlash against band

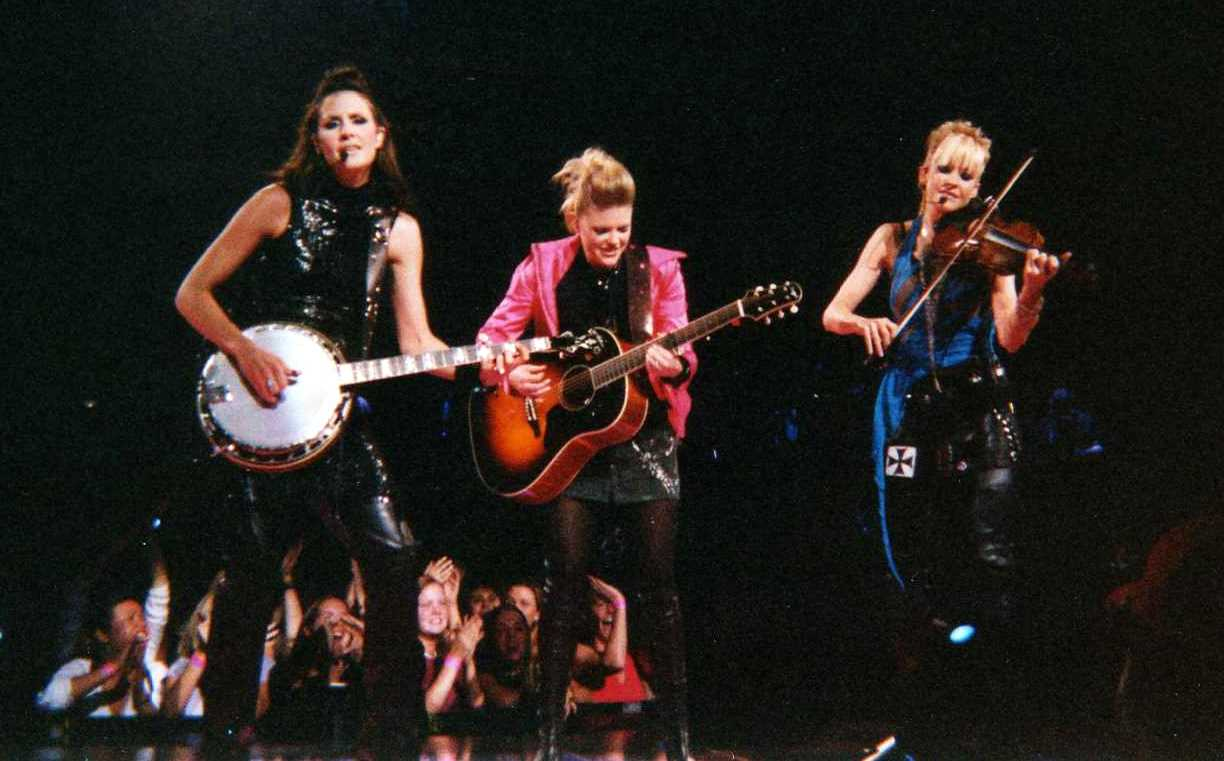
The Dixie Chicks performing at Madison Square Garden on June 20, 2003, during the Top of the World Tour

In March 2003, the American country band the Chicks, then known as the Dixie Chicks, publicly criticized the American president, George W. Bush, triggering a backlash. At a concert in London during their Top of the World Tour, the lead singer, Natalie Maines, said the Dixie Chicks were ashamed that Bush was from their home state of Texas and that they did not support the imminent invasion of Iraq.

The Dixie Chicks were one of the most popular American country acts at the time. After the statement was reported by the British newspaper The Guardian, it triggered a backlash from American country listeners, who were mostly right-wing and supported the war. The Dixie Chicks were blacklisted by many country radio stations, received death threats and were criticized by other country musicians. Sales of their music and concert tickets declined and they lost corporate sponsorship.

A few days later, Maines issued an apology, saying her remark had been disrespectful. She rescinded the apology in 2006, saying she felt Bush deserved no respect. In 2006, the Dixie Chicks released the single "Not Ready to Make Nice", which addressed the criticism.

Entertainment Weekly likened the incident to the backlash after John Lennon quipped in 1966 that the Beatles were more popular than Jesus. The controversy was covered in the 2006 documentary Dixie Chicks: Shut Up and Sing. The Dixie Chicks and their position on Bush was cited as an influence by later country artists including Taylor Swift, Miranda Lambert and Kacey Musgraves.

== Background ==
The Dixie Chicks formed in 1989 in Dallas, Texas. By the turn of the millennium, they had become one of the most popular American country acts and the bestselling female band of all time. According to the Guardian journalist Betty Clarke, the Dixie Chicks were controversial in the American country establishment, which disapproved of their "feisty songs, their provocative style or the fact they were selling huge numbers of progressive bluegrass records to pop kids".

Following the September 11 attacks in 2001, American country music featured more patriotic sentiment than normal, in hit songs such as Toby Keith's "Courtesy of the Red, White and Blue (The Angry American)", Darryl Worley's "Have You Forgotten?", and Alan Jackson’s “Where Were You (When The World Stopped Turning)”. Many country fans and radio stations supported President George W. Bush and the impending invasion of Iraq. Market research found that the average country listener was white, suburban and right-wing.

== Maines' statement ==
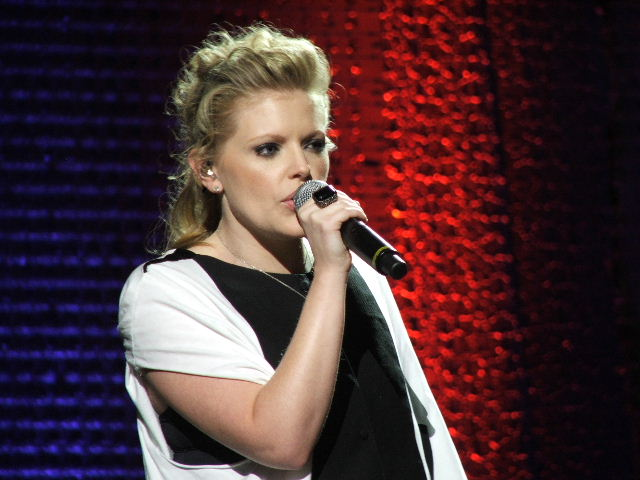
Maines in Austin, Texas, in 2006

On March 10, 2003, nine days before the invasion of Iraq, the Dixie Chicks performed at the Shepherd's Bush Empire theatre in London, England. It was the first concert of their Top of the World tour in support of their sixth album, Home. Introducing their cover of "Travelin' Soldier", the lead singer, Natalie Maines, told the audience:

Just so you know, we're on the good side with y'all. We do not want this war, this violence, and we're ashamed that the President of the United States is from Texas.

After Maines made her comment, her bandmate, Emily Strayer, added: "But you know we're behind the troops 100 percent." Reviewing the concert for the British newspaper The Guardian, Clarke reported Maines' comment and said that the audience cheered. Clarke wrote: "At a time when country stars are rushing to release pro-war anthems, this is practically punk rock."

== Backlash ==
Maines's remark triggered a backlash in the United States. Many country fans saw her as traitorous for not supporting the president. Focus tests by Country Music Television found that audiences felt abandoned, and particularly disliked that Maines had criticized Bush in a foreign country, feeling it was cowardly. Maines said she made the statement in London because "that's where I was". She said her remark had been misinterpreted as insult to American troops or an attack on their morale, and that she had instead only criticized the political leadership.

The Dixie Chicks single "Landslide", a Fleetwood Mac cover, fell from number 10 to 43 on the Billboard Hot 100 in one week and left the chart a week later. The Dixie Chicks were blacklisted by many country radio stations, including all 42 country stations operated by Cumulus Media. On May 6, the Colorado radio station KKCS suspended two DJs for playing their music. WTDR-FM in Talladega, Alabama, dropped the Dixie Chicks after more than 250 listeners called on a single day to criticize Maines's comments. Jim Jacobs, the president of Jacobs Broadcast Group, which includes WTDR, described emotional callers describing family members in the American military. The Dixie Chicks' manager, Simon Renshaw, noted that, by contrast, the stations continued to play the music of Tracy Lawrence, who had been convicted of spousal abuse in 1998.

In a poll by an Atlanta radio station, 76 percent of listeners who participated responded they would return their Dixie Chicks CDs if they could. Protesters in Bossier City, Louisiana, used a tractor to destroy Dixie Chicks CDs and other items. The Kansas City station WDAF-AM placed trashcans outside its office for listeners to dispose of their CDs and displayed hundreds of emails from listeners supporting the boycott.

Martie Maguire's tour bus driver resigned in protest of their remarks. Maines said she found this "unfathomable", but that "we're learning more and more that it's not that unfathomable to a large percentage of the population". The drinks manufacturer Lipton canceled its promotional contract with the Dixie Chicks.

=== Apology from Maines ===
On March 12, two days after she had made her statement, Maines issued a disclaimer:

While we support our troops, there is nothing more frightening than the notion of going to war with Iraq and the prospect of all the innocent lives that will be lost. I feel the president is ignoring the opinions of many in the US and alienating the rest of the world. My comments were made in frustration, and one of the privileges of being an American is you are free to voice your own point of view.

The statement failed to appease critics. Two days later, Maines issued an apology, saying:

As a concerned American citizen, I apologize to President Bush because my remark was disrespectful. I feel that whoever holds that office should be treated with the utmost respect. We are currently in Europe and witnessing a huge anti-American sentiment as a result of the perceived rush to war. While war may remain a viable option, as a mother, I just want to see every possible alternative exhausted before children and American soldiers' lives are lost. I love my country. I am a proud American.

That month, the former US vice president Al Gore told a college audience: "[The Dixie Chicks] were made to feel un-American and risked economic retaliation because of what was said. Our democracy has taken a hit. Our best protection is free and open debate." The musician Bruce Springsteen released a statement supporting the Dixie Chicks, describing them as "terrific American artists expressing American values by using their American right to free speech ... For them to be banished wholesale from radio stations, and even entire radio networks, for speaking out is un-American." The country musician Merle Haggard, who released a song criticizing American media coverage of the Iraq War, wrote that the backlash was "like a verbal witch hunt and lynching". He said it was insulting to those who had died in wars "when almost the majority of America jumped down their throats for simply voicing an opinion".

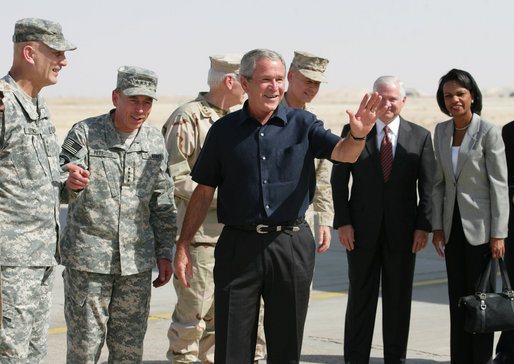
Bush in Al Asad Airbase, Iraq, in 2007

On April 24, Bush responded to the controversy in an interview with the broadcaster Tom Brokaw:

The Dixie Chicks are free to speak their mind. They can say what they want to say ... They shouldn't have their feelings hurt just because some people don't want to buy their records when they speak out ... Freedom is a two-way street ... I don't really care what the Dixie Chicks said. I want to do what I think is right for the American people, and if some singers or Hollywood stars feel like speaking out, that's fine. That's the great thing about America.

On the same day, the Dixie Chicks launched a publicity campaign to respond to the criticism. In a prime-time interview with Diane Sawyer on ABC, Maines said she remained proud of her statement.

=== Media appearances ===
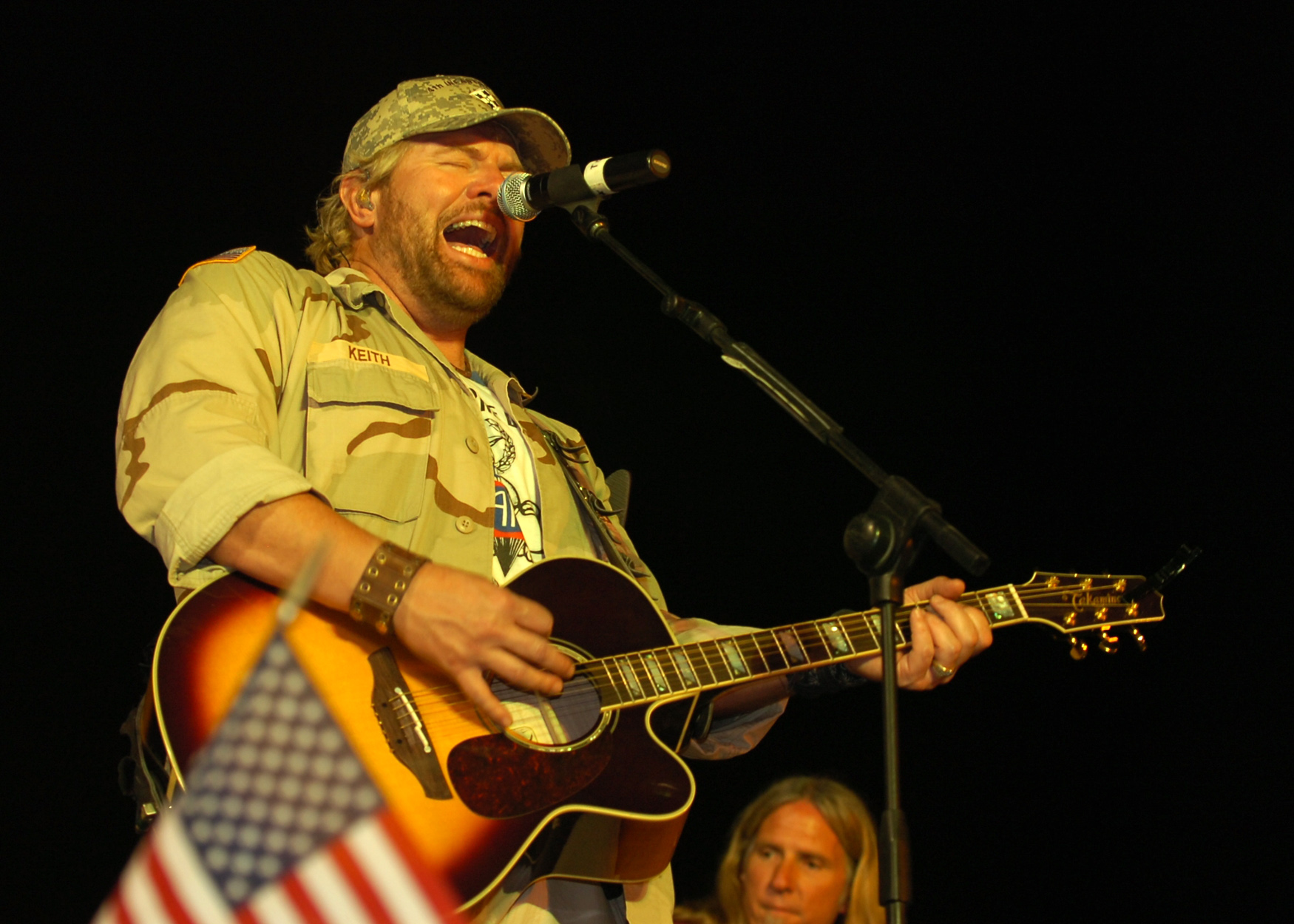
Toby Keith (pictured in 2008) displayed a doctored photo of Maines and the Iraqi president Saddam Hussein at his concerts.

At their first show of the Dixie Chicks' American tour, on May 1 in Greenville, South Carolina, Maines wore a T-shirt bearing the words "Dare to Be Free". An anti-Dixie Chicks concert was held in a neighboring town. Following death threats, metal detectors were installed at the Dixie Chicks shows. In Dallas, Maines had to be escorted by police to a concert and then the airport. She installed 24-hour security outside her home, and trash was dumped outside Strayer's home.

The Dixie Chicks appeared naked on the May 2 cover of Entertainment Weekly, covered in words and phrases ascribed to them during the controversy, including "traitors", "Saddam's Angels", "Dixie Sluts", "proud Americans", "hero", "free speech" and "brave". The cover further alienated fans. In the issue, Maines said that the Dixie Chicks had "nothing but support for the troops" and did not hate people who supported the war. All the band supported her, saying: "Natalie's comment came from frustration that we all shared— we were apparently days away from war and still left with a lot of questions."

On May 21, at the Academy of Country Music Awards ceremony in Las Vegas, the Dixie Chicks' nomination for Entertainer of the Year was announced to boos. The award was given to Toby Keith, who had displayed a doctored photo of Maines and the Iraqi president, Saddam Hussein, at his concerts. Maines had criticized Keith the previous year, calling his music "blatantly jingoistic". During the Dixie Chicks' performance at the ceremony, Maines wore a T-shirt with the letters "FUTK". A Dixie Chicks spokesperson said the letters stood for "Friends united in truth and kindness", but many took it to mean "Fuck you Toby Keith"; some Dixie Chicks critics responded by wearing T-shirts bearing the letters "FUDC". In a 2004 interview on Real Time with Bill Maher, Maines said that she had believed that no one would understand the T-shirt. The performance drew further criticism from country music stations.

In July, the Dixie Chicks performed for and donated $10,000 to Rock the Vote, an organization encouraging young adults to register to vote. Maines said, "We always felt like we were searching for ways to make an impact outside of music [...] I believe everything that's happened in the last few months happened for a reason. A lot of positive things have come from it, and this is just one of them." In September, Maguire told the German magazine Der Spiegel that the Dixie Chicks no longer felt part of the country music scene. She cited a lack of support from country stars and the experience at the Academy of Country Music Awards, and said: "Instead, we won three Grammys against much stronger competition. So we now consider ourselves part of the big rock 'n' roll family." By 2004, the Dixie Chicks were still facing reduced ticket sales. That year, they joined acts including Springsteen and Pearl Jam for the Vote for Change tour, raising money for causes against Bush's reelection.

== Legacy ==
In May 2006, Maines rescinded the apology she had made in 2003, saying: "I don't feel that way any more. I don't feel [Bush] is owed any respect whatsoever." The backlash was documented in the 2006 documentary Dixie Chicks: Shut Up and Sing. The television network NBC refused to air a commercial for the documentary, citing a policy against ads dealing with "public controversy". The commercials were also declined by CW. The film's distributor, Harvey Weinstein, said: "It's a sad commentary about the level of fear in our society that a movie about a group of courageous entertainers who were blacklisted for exercising their right of free speech is now itself being blacklisted by corporate America."

As of 2006, many stations still refused to play the Dixie Chicks. Focus tests by KFKF-FM in Kansas City found that listeners still disliked them; the program director said: "It's not the music, because we're playing them the hits they used to love. It's something visceral. I've never seen anything like it." Maguire said she would rather have a smaller group of dedicated fans than "people that have us in their five-disc changer with Reba McEntire and Toby Keith". The Guardian connected the radio blacklisting to a fall in female artists in the annual top 100 country songs, from 38% in 1999 to 18% in 2015.

In 2006, the Dixie Chicks released the single "Not Ready to Make Nice", addressing the criticism. In June, they returned to Shepherd's Bush Empire and sold T-shirts with the words "the only Bush we trust is Shepherd's Bush". Maines reiterated that they were ashamed that Bush came from Texas. Sales of the Dixie Chicks' next album, Taking the Long Way (2006), and tour fell short of expectations, but the album won five Grammy Awards, including Album of the Year. After their performance at the 2007 Grammy Awards, the Dixie Chicks went on hiatus until 2013.

Entertainment Weekly speculated that if Betty Clarke had not quoted the remark in her Guardian review it would not have been picked up by American media. Clarke wrote in 2007 that she stood by her decision to include the quote and that the "modern-day witch trial" had been surreal and unnerving. In 2016, Maines told the New York Times: "I look at how much more polarized and intolerant people have become now. With social media, opinions all start becoming noise, but at that point, people weren't really supposed to have an opinion." Strayer said that the controversy "feels like another lifetime to me, it doesn't even feel real— our country's changed, we've changed, the fans definitely have".

The Dixie Chicks and their position on Bush was cited as an influence by later country artists including Taylor Swift, Miranda Lambert and Kacey Musgraves. Pitchfork described this as "a legacy tied both to their music and their message of integrity". In 2019, Swift said that country artists had come under pressure from record companies to avoid talking about politics and to "not be like the Dixie Chicks", which she felt was unjust. The music journalist Kelefa Sanneh wrote in 2021 that the controversy "made it easier for smug partisans on both sides to feel validated". Some country fans felt it confirmed that the Dixie Chicks felt they were "too good" for country music, whereas some Dixie Chicks fans felt it confirmed that the country industry was too corporate and partisan.

== See also ==
- Cancel culture
- Jane Fonda's anti-war activity
- Eartha Kitt "White House Incident"
