= Top of the World Tour: Live =

Live album by Dixie Chicks

Live album by Dixie Chicks
- Released: November 25, 2003
- Recorded: June–August 2003
- Genre: Country
- Length: 96:23
- Label: Columbia
- Producer: The Chicks, Lloyd Maines

Dixie Chicks chronology
Home (2002)	Top of the World Tour: Live (2003)	Taking the Long Way (2006)

Professional ratings
Review scores
Source	Rating
About.com	link
AllMusic	link
BBC Music	(favorable) link
Q	link
Rolling Stone	link

Top of the World Tour: Live is the first live album by American country music band Dixie Chicks, released in November 2003.

It records their successful Top of the World Tour. A DVD Top of the World Tour: Live was also released with the material of the tour. Both are composites of multiple shows. As of March 2020, Top of the World Tour: Live has sold 1 million copies in the United States and has been certified Platinum by the Recording Industry Association of America (RIAA).

== Track listing ==
CD 1
No.	Title	Writer(s)	Length
1.	"Goodbye Earl"	Dennis Linde	4:37
2.	"Some Days You Gotta Dance"	Troy Johnson, Marshall Morgan	2:39
3.	"There's Your Trouble"	Mark Selby, Tia Sillers	3:21
4.	"Long Time Gone"	Darrell Scott	4:10
5.	"Tortured, Tangled Hearts"	Martie Maguire, Natalie Maines, Marty Stuart	3:44
6.	"Travelin' Soldier"	Bruce Robison	5:56
7.	"Am I the Only One (Who's Ever Felt This Way)"	Maria McKee	3:31
8.	"Hello Mr. Heartache"	Mike Henderson, John Hadley	3:59
9.	"Cold Day in July"	Richard Leigh	4:51
10.	"White Trash Wedding"	Maguire, Maines, Emily Robison	2:33
11.	"Lil' Jack Slade"	Terri Hendrix, Maguire, Lloyd Maines, E. Robison	2:40

CD 2
No.	Title	Writer(s)	Length
1.	"A Home"	Maia Sharp, Randy Sharp	5:48
2.	"Truth No. 2"	Patty Griffin	5:13
3.	"If I Fall You're Going Down with Me"	Matraca Berg, Annie Roboff	3:05
4.	"Mississippi"	Bob Dylan	5:14
5.	"Cowboy Take Me Away"	Martie Seidel, Marcus Hummon	4:58
6.	"Godspeed (Sweet Dreams)"	Radney Foster	4:41
7.	"Landslide"	Stevie Nicks	4:01
8.	"Ready to Run"	Hummon, Seidel	4:30
9.	"Wide Open Spaces"	Susan Gibson	5:42
10.	"Top of the World"	Griffin	6:25
11.	"Sin Wagon"	Maines, Erwin, Stephony Smith	4:34

== Personnel ==
Dixie Chicks

- Martie McGuire – fiddle, mandolin, viola, soloist, background vocals
- Natalie Maines – bass guitar, acoustic guitar, electric guitar, lead vocals
- Emily Robison – banjo, dobro, acoustic guitar, electric guitar, background vocals

Additional Musicians

- Roscoe Beck – bass guitar, upright bass, fretless bass guitar, electric guitar, background vocals
- Matthew Brubeck – cello
- Roger Cabot – Hammond organ
- John Deaderick – accordion, keyboards, Hammond organ, background vocals
- Jason Deleu – Hammond organ
- Drew Findley – programming
- John Gardner – djembe, drums, snare drums, percussion, tambourine
- Todd Green – Hammond organ
- David Grissom – 12-string electric guitar, acoustic guitar, electric guitar, electric baritone guitar, background vocals
- Emmylou Harris – background vocals
- Bob House – Hammond organ
- Linda Ghidossi de Luca – viola
- Ryan Merfy – Hammond organ
- Henry Metcalfe – Hammond organ
- John Mock – cello arrangements, concertina, acoustic guitar, electric guitar, irish whistle, percussion, string arrangements, tambourine, tin whistle
- Lorenza Ponce – violin, string arrangements
- Richard Randall – Hammond organ
- Michael Rhodes – bass guitar
- Keith Sewell – fiddle, acoustic guitar, soloist, background vocals
- Hiroki Tagachi – violin
- Brent Truitt – mandolin, background vocals
- Robby Turner – dobro, steel guitar, background vocals

== Chart performance ==
=== Weekly charts ===
Chart (2003)	Peak position
US Billboard 200	21
US Top Country Albums (Billboard)	3

=== Year-end charts ===
Chart (2004)	Position
US Billboard 200	105
US Top Country Albums (Billboard)	15
Chart (2005)	Position
US Top Country Albums (Billboard)	67

== Certifications ==
Region	Certification	Certified units/sales
Australia (ARIA)	Platinum	70,000^{‡}
United States (RIAA)	Platinum	1,000,000^{‡}
^{‡} Sales+streaming figures based on certification alone.
