= Godspeed (Sweet Dreams) =

Single by Radney Foster

from the album See What You Want to See
- Released: June 1, 1999
- Genre: Country folk
- Length: 4:54
- Label: Arista Nashville
- Songwriter: Radney Foster
- Producer: Darrell Brown

Radney Foster singles chronology
"I'm In" (1998)	"Godspeed (Sweet Dreams)" (1999)	"Texas in 1880" (2001)

"Godspeed (Sweet Dreams)" is a song written and originally recorded by American country music artist Radney Foster, with singer Emmylou Harris featured as a background vocalist. It was originally released on June 1, 1999 as the second single to his third studio album See What You Want to See (1999) by Arista Nashville to coincide with Father's Day. "Godspeed" would become better well known when female country group the Chicks, formerly the Dixie Chicks, recorded the song for their sixth studio album Home (2002), where it became a minor chart entry for them in 2003.

== Content ==
In an interview with Shawna Ortega of Songfacts, Foster said he dedicated the song to his son Julien. He and his wife divorced when Julien was young and she re-married to a French man, to whom she immigrated to France with him. Foster lost custody of his child following many court battles; he however wanted to show his son that he still loved him dearly. Foster wrote "Godspeed" because of this and recorded it to a cassette so his son could have a reminder of him.

Foster's original version of "Godspeed" debuted and peaked at number 74 on the US Hot Country Songs chart on July 3, 1999, where it spent one week.

== The Chicks version ==
"Godspeed (Sweet Dreams)"

Single by Dixie Chicks

from the album Home
- Released: June 2, 2003
- Genre: Country folk
- Length: 4:42
- Label: Open Wide; Monument; Columbia Nashville
- Songwriter: Radney Foster
- Producers: Dixie Chicks; Lloyd Maines

Dixie Chicks singles chronology
"Travelin' Soldier" (2003)	"Godspeed (Sweet Dreams)" (2003)	"Top of the World" (2003)

The Dixie Chicks, now known simply as the Chicks, recorded a version of "Godspeed" for their sixth studio album and fourth major label album Home (2002). The group released it on June 2, 2003, as the fourth single from the record. Emmylou Harris also is a backing vocalist on their version. "Godspeed" was far less successful than the previous singles however, becoming the Chicks' first single to outright miss the top forty at country radio.

=== Commercial performance ===
The Chicks' version of "Godspeed" debuted at number 59 on the US Hot Country Songs chart for the week of June 7, 2003; it was the first single released by the group following lead singer Natalie Maines' controversial comments on George W. Bush regarding the handling of the Iraq War. This led country radio, a format that embraced the group, to turn on them. "Godspeed" peaked at number 48 on June 28, 2003 where it stayed for two weeks, becoming the Chicks' first single to miss the top forty of the chart; their previous lowest peaking song, "Heartbreak Town" reached number 21. It spent only 9 weeks total. The backlash also led the album's final single "Top of the World" to completely fail to chart.

== Charts ==
=== Radney Foster version ===
Chart (1999)	Peak position
US Hot Country Songs (Billboard)	74

=== The Chicks version ===
Chart (2003)	Peak position
US Hot Country Songs (Billboard)	48

== Release history ==
Release dates and format(s) for "Godspeed (Sweet Dreams)"
Region	Date	Format(s)	Label(s)	Ref.
United States	June 2, 2003	Country radio	Open Wide; Monument; Columbia Nashville	
