= Top of the World Tour =

2003 concert tour by the Dixie Chicks

- Tour by Dixie Chicks
- Tour memorabilia
- Associated album: Home
- Start date: May 1, 2003
- End date: October 12, 2003
- Legs: 3
- No. of shows: 65 in North America; 10 in Europe; 6 in Australia; 81 Total

Dixie Chicks concert chronology
- Fly Tour (2000); Top of the World Tour (2003); Vote for Change (2004)

The Top of the World Tour was the 2003 concert tour by American country music trio Dixie Chicks. It was in support of their album Home, and named after the song "Top of the World" on that album.

== History ==
The tour began with three promotional concerts in Europe and Australia. During the first of these on March 10, 2003, at Shepherd's Bush Empire in London, Natalie Maines made her controversial remarks criticizing President George W. Bush a few days before the start of the Iraq War: "Just so you know, we’re on the good side with y’all. We do not want this war, this violence, and we’re ashamed that the President of the United States is from Texas." The backdrop to this statement was the large protests in Britain against the impending war.

The first leg of the tour then took place in North America, running from the beginning of May to mid-August. The Bush controversy and a comment against a Toby Keith song resulted in the state of South Carolina not wanting to let the band in. Natalie Maines stated, "These fans paid their hard earned money to see us play, and we will give them the show they paid to see!" The concert went on. The second leg took place in Western Europe in September, followed by a brief third leg in Australia that finished in early October. A couple of concerts back in the United States finished the tour.

The tour grossed $60.5 million, making it the highest grossing country music tour up until that time (since superseded by several artists). It was also the 8th highest-grossing tour of any genre in 2003.

The live album Top of the World Tour: Live and DVD Top of the World Tour: Live document the tour — both are composed of performances from multiple shows. Dressing room and on-stage scenes from the tour, as well as the effect of Maines' controversial statement on the venture, were included in the 2006 documentary Dixie Chicks: Shut Up and Sing.

== The show ==
The multi-tiered in-the-round stage was a feat of engineering complete with shifting hydraulic-lift levels, winding catwalks and walkways that extended over the heads of the audience. It weighed over 80,000 pounds and took up most of the arena floor. A crew of 120 traveled in thirteen busses and seventeen trucks. This show included the largest touring video show, with 1.5 million LED lights displaying graphics on video screens and on the floor of the stage. During the show, artificial flowers, grass, trees and a windmill sprung up from underneath the stage. It took over 2000 amps of power and 240 pounds of CO_{2} gas to run the special effects for each show.

Recorded pre-show music included "(What's So Funny 'Bout) Peace, Love and Understanding?", "Band on the Run", "Thank You (Falettinme Be Mice Elf Agin)", and "Born in the U.S.A.".

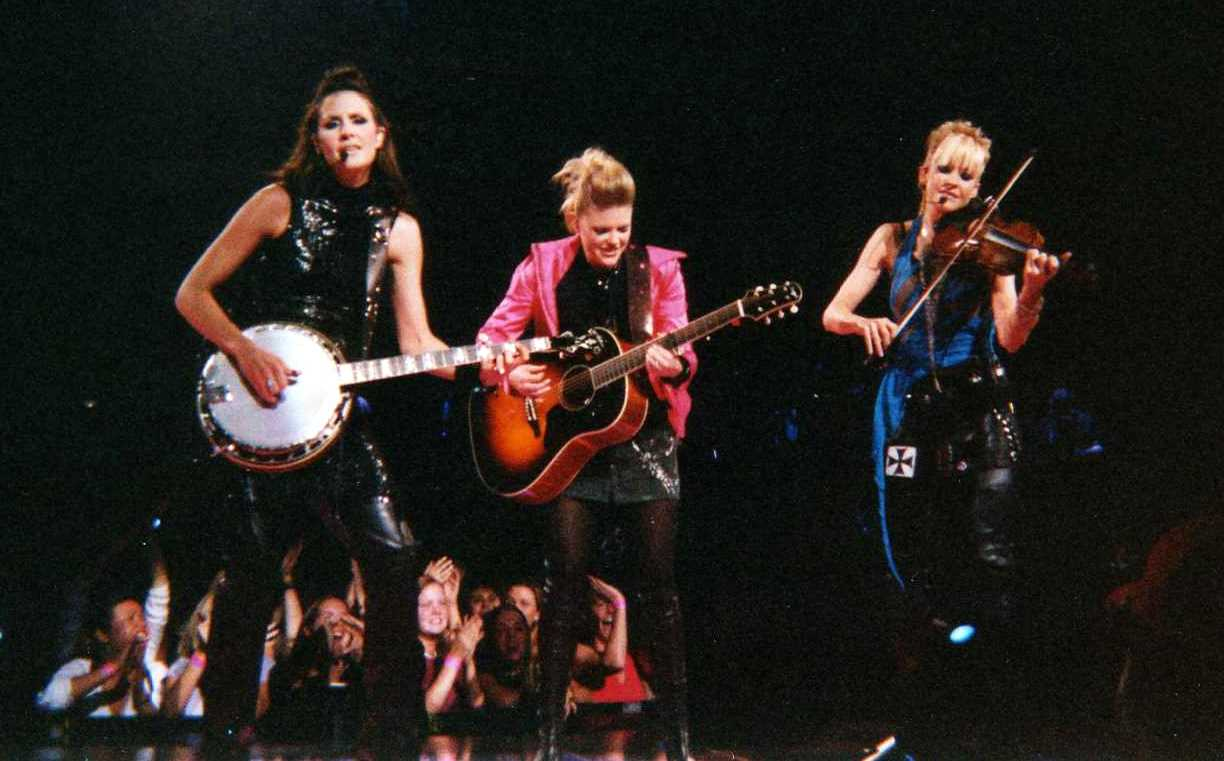
The Dixie Chicks front and center: Madison Square Garden, June 20, 2003.

During the show the three singers used headset microphones and were frequently well apart from each other. Nevertheless, stage patter was fairly frequent, with a notable case of Martie Maguire confessing that her rather unusual clothing assemblage made her look like "Crack whore Barbie". A new addition to the group's repertoire was a long, churning rendition of Bob Dylan's travelphobic "Mississippi".

In the opening U.S. show, Natalie offered fans 15 seconds to boo, in reference of the controversy surrounding the tour. However, after a count of three, there was thunderous applause instead.

== Opening acts ==
- Joan Osborne (North America, Spring 2003) Start-Philadelphia
- Michelle Branch (North America, Summer 2003)
- Jann Arden (Canada, August 2003)
- The Thorns (Europe, Australia)

== Set list ==
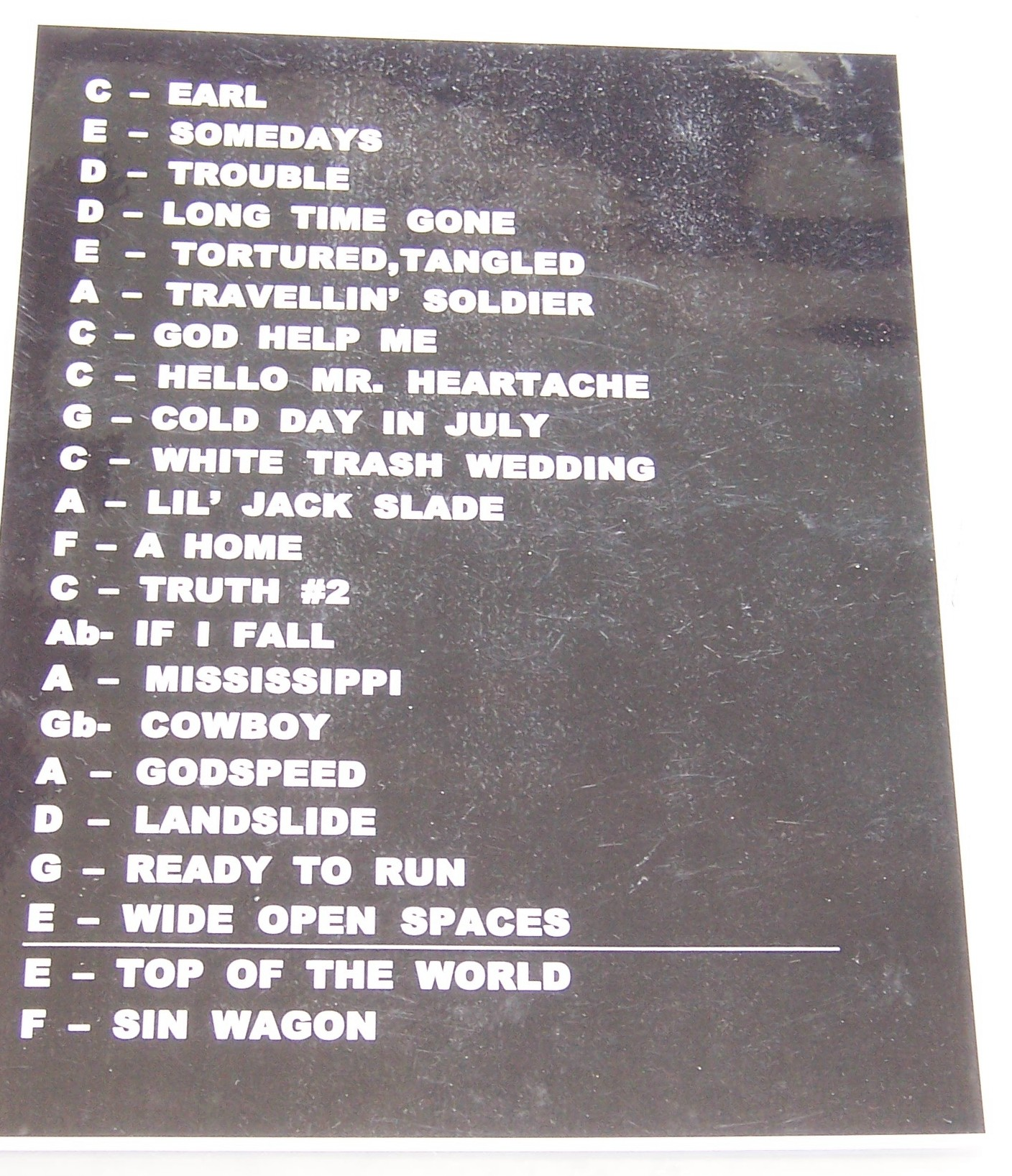
An actual set list retrieved from the stage, from the June 20 concert at Madison Square Garden.

The following songs were performed during the concert at Madison Square Garden in New York City. It does not represent all songs performed on tour.

1. "Goodbye Earl"
2. "Some Days You Gotta Dance"
3. "There's Your Trouble"
4. "Long Time Gone"
5. "Tortured, Tangled Hearts"
6. "Travelin' Soldier
7. "Am I The Only One (Who's Ever Felt This Way)"
8. "Hello Mr. Heartache"
9. "Cold Day in July"
10. "White Trash Wedding"
11. "Lil' Jack Slade"
12. "A Home"
13. "Truth No. 2"
14. "If I Fall You're Going Down with Me"
15. "Mississippi"
16. "Cowboy Take Me Away"
17. "Godspeed (Sweet Dreams)"
18. "Landslide"
19. "Ready To Run"
20. "Wide Open Spaces"

Encore

21. "Top of the World"
22. "Sin Wagon"

== Tour dates ==
Date	City	Country	Venue	Tickets Sold / Available	Revenue
North America
May 1, 2003	Greenville	United States	BI-LO Center	14,811 / 14,811	$855,146
May 3, 2003	Orlando	United States	TD Waterhouse Centre	15,726 / 15,726	$872,525
May 4, 2003	Sunrise	United States	Office Depot Center	15,470 / 17,924	$927,560
May 5, 2003	Tampa	United States	St. Pete Times Forum	15,535 / 17,969	$953,993
May 7, 2003	Knoxville	United States	Thompson–Boling Arena	18,521 / 18,521	$1,084,740
May 8, 2003	Indianapolis	United States	Conseco Fieldhouse	15,878 / 15,878	$927,085
May 10, 2003	Kansas City	United States	Kemper Arena	17,890 / 17,973	$1,047,310
May 11, 2003	St. Louis	United States	Savvis Center	18,029 / 18,449	$1,072,595
May 13, 2003	Ames	United States	Hilton Coliseum	13,845 / 13,845	$805,680
May 14, 2003	Moline	United States	The MARK of the Quad Cities	10,476 / 10,476	$611,310
May 16, 2003	Birmingham	United States	BJCC Arena	—N/a	—N/a
May 17, 2003	Greensboro	United States	Greensboro Coliseum	—N/a	—N/a
May 18, 2003	Louisville	United States	Freedom Hall	16,894 / 16,894	$996,970
May 20, 2003	Oklahoma City	United States	Ford Center	16,992 / 16,992	$1,001,425
May 21, 2003	Austin	United States	Frank Erwin Center	14,769 / 14,769	$828,925
May 29, 2003	Chicago	United States	United Center	36,500 / 36,500	$2,213,900
May 30, 2003	Chicago	United States	United Center	36,500 / 36,500	$2,213,900
June 2, 2003	Auburn Hills	United States	The Palace of Auburn Hills	35,389 / 35,389	$2,110,958
June 3, 2003	Auburn Hills	United States	The Palace of Auburn Hills	35,389 / 35,389	$2,110,958
June 5, 2003	Milwaukee	United States	Bradley Center	17,364 / 17,364	$1,032,690
June 6, 2003	Saint Paul	United States	Xcel Energy Center	39,636 / 39,636	$2,152,655
June 7, 2003	Saint Paul	United States	Xcel Energy Center	39,636 / 39,636	$2,152,655
June 9, 2003	Cincinnati	United States	U.S. Bank Arena	15,546 / 16,800	$950,300
June 10, 2003	Columbus	United States	Nationwide Arena	17,498 / 17,498	$1,026,200
June 11, 2003	Cleveland	United States	Gund Arena	16,252 / 19,769	$968,265
June 13, 2003	Buffalo	United States	HSBC Arena	18,102 / 18,102	$1,054,685
June 14, 2003	Pittsburgh	United States	Mellon Arena	16,276 / 16,276	$871,090
June 16, 2003	Philadelphia	United States	First Union Center	36,058 / 36,058	$2,431,384
June 17, 2003	Philadelphia	United States	First Union Center	36,058 / 36,058	$2,431,384
June 19, 2003	Boston	United States	FleetCenter	16,850 / 16,850	$1,111,390
June 20, 2003	New York City	United States	Madison Square Garden	—N/a	—N/a
June 21, 2003	New York City	United States	Madison Square Garden	—N/a	—N/a
June 23, 2003	Uniondale	United States	Nassau Veterans Memorial Coliseum	—N/a	—N/a
June 25, 2003	Washington, D.C.	United States	MCI Center	34,155 / 34,155	$2,063,455
June 26, 2003	Washington, D.C.	United States	MCI Center	34,155 / 34,155	$2,063,455
June 27, 2003	Albany	United States	Pepsi Arena	14,691 / 14,691	$884,635
July 6, 2003	Dallas	United States	American Airlines Center	16,704 / 16,704	$1,011,720
July 8, 2003	Denver	United States	Pepsi Center	16,034 / 16,034	$964,820
July 9, 2003	Salt Lake City	United States	Delta Center	15,435 / 15,435	$929,425
July 11, 2003	Vancouver	Canada	General Motors Place	17,429 / 17,429	$1,060,338
July 12, 2003	Seattle	United States	KeyArena	13,484 / 13,484	$787,220
July 13, 2003	Portland	United States	Rose Garden Arena	17,857 / 17,857	$1,071,345
July 15, 2003	Oakland	United States	The Arena in Oakland	17,072 / 17,072	$1,047,651
July 16, 2003	San Jose	United States	HP Pavilion	16,977 / 16,977	$999,300
July 17, 2003	Sacramento	United States	ARCO Arena	15,006 / 15,006	$862,535
July 19, 2003	Los Angeles	United States	Staples Center	15,609 / 15,609	$889,285
July 20, 2003	Anaheim	United States	Arrowhead Pond	29,985 / 29,985	$1,866,945
July 21, 2003	Anaheim	United States	Arrowhead Pond	29,985 / 29,985	$1,866,945
July 23, 2003	San Diego	United States	Cox Arena at Aztec Bowl	11,168 / 11,168	$723,021
July 25, 2003	Phoenix	United States	America West Arena	15,984 / 15,984	$965,950
July 26, 2003	Las Vegas	United States	MGM Grand Garden Arena	22,098 / 22,098	$1,845,845
July 27, 2003	Las Vegas	United States	MGM Grand Garden Arena	22,098 / 22,098	$1,845,845
July 29, 2003	San Antonio	United States	SBC Center	14,965 / 14,965	$857,275
July 30, 2003	Houston	United States	Compaq Center	14,700 / 14,700	$884,964
August 1, 2003	North Little Rock	United States	Alltel Arena	16,790 / 16,790	$998,500
August 2, 2003	Memphis	United States	Pyramid Arena	18,745 / 18,745	$1,112,664
August 3, 2003	Atlanta	United States	Philips Arena	17,101 / 17,101	$1,001,135
August 4, 2003	Nashville	United States	Gaylord Entertainment Center	15,696 / 15,696	$921,730
August 6, 2003	Toronto	Canada	Air Canada Centre	17,470 / 17,470	$1,031,779
August 7, 2003	Ottawa	Canada	Corel Centre	—N/a	—N/a
August 8, 2003	Hamilton	Canada	Copps Coliseum	—N/a	—N/a
August 12, 2003	Edmonton	Canada	Skyreach Centre	12,590 / 12,590	$732,590
August 13, 2003	Calgary	Canada	Pengrowth Saddledome	13,442 / 13,442	$850,800
Europe
September 6, 2003	Stockholm	Sweden	Annexet	—N/a	—N/a
September 8, 2003	Hamburg	Germany	CCH Hall 1	—N/a	—N/a
September 10, 2003	Birmingham	England	NEC Arena	—N/a	—N/a
September 11, 2003	Manchester	England	Carling Apollo Manchester	—N/a	—N/a
September 14, 2003	London	England	Royal Albert Hall	7,022 / 7,216	$323,270
September 15, 2003	London	England	Royal Albert Hall	7,022 / 7,216	$323,270
September 18, 2003	Dublin	Ireland	Point Theatre	—N/a	—N/a
September 19, 2003	Glasgow	Scotland	Scottish Exhibition and Conference Centre	—N/a	—N/a
September 21, 2003	Munich	Germany	Olympiahalle	—N/a	—N/a
September 22, 2003	Frankfurt	Germany	Jahrhunderthalle	—N/a	—N/a
Australia
September 28, 2003	Melbourne	Australia	Rod Laver Arena	—N/a	—N/a
September 29, 2003	Melbourne	Australia	Rod Laver Arena	—N/a	—N/a
October 1, 2003	Brisbane	Australia	Brisbane Entertainment Centre	—N/a	—N/a
October 2, 2003	Brisbane	Australia	Brisbane Entertainment Centre	—N/a	—N/a
October 4, 2003	Sydney	Australia	Sydney Super Dome	—N/a	—N/a
October 5, 2003	Sydney	Australia	Sydney Entertainment Centre	—N/a	—N/a
North America
October 10, 2003	Charlotte	United States	Verizon Wireless Amphitheatre	—N/a	
October 12, 2003^{[A]}	Washington, D.C.	United States	MCI Center	11,102 / 12,200	$896,827

Festivals and other miscellaneous performances
^{A} Recording Artists Coalition Benefit

Cancellations and rescheduled shows

June 2, 2003	Cleveland, Ohio	Gund Arena	Rescheduled to June 11, 2003
June 12, 2003	Toronto, Canada	Air Canada Centre	Rescheduled to August 6, 2003

== Backing band ==
There may have been minor changes to this lineup depending on the venue.

- Roscoe Beck – bass
- John Deaderick – keyboards
- John Gardner – drums
- David Grissom – acoustic guitar, electric guitar
- John Mock – pennywhistle, concertina, percussion, guitar and more.
- Brent Truitt – mandolin
- Robbie Turner – steel guitar
- Keith Sewell – acoustic guitar
- Timothy S. Wright - Bass, Upright, Keyboards, Pedal Steel & Dobro Tech
