= Everybody Knows (Dixie Chicks song) =

Single by Dixie Chicks

from the album Taking the Long Way
- Released: April 25, 2006
- Genre: Country
- Length: 4:16
- Label: Columbia Nashville
- Songwriters: Gary Louris; Martie Maguire; Natalie Maines; Emily Robison
- Producer: Rick Rubin

Dixie Chicks singles chronology
"Not Ready to Make Nice" (2006)	"Everybody Knows" (2006)	"The Long Way Around" (2007)

"Everybody Knows" is a country song written and performed by the American band Dixie Chicks. It was released as the second physical single from their seventh studio album, Taking the Long Way (2006).

== Song information ==
The song, which was written in collaboration with Gary Louris, is about the consequences that fame and success has on the lives of a celebrity.

== Covers ==
The song was covered by co-writer Louris's alt-country band the Jayhawks on their 2018 album Back Roads and Abandoned Motels.

Scottish rock band Gun recorded a cover of the song in 2016, as part of the re-release of their album Frantic. The song was later included on their best-of compilation R3L0ADED in 2019.

== Chart performance ==
Chart (2006)	Peak position
US Hot Country Songs (Billboard)	45
