= I Hope (Dixie Chicks song) =

Promotional single by Dixie Chicks

from the album Taking the Long Way
- Released: September 27, 2005
- Genre: Country pop; blue-eyed soul
- Length: 4:04 (radio edit); 5:04 (iTunes); 5:25 (album)
- Label: Columbia Nashville
- Songwriters: Martie Maguire; Natalie Maines; Emily Robison; Kevin Moore
- Producer: Rick Rubin

Dixie Chicks singles chronology
"Top of the World" (2003)	"I Hope" (2005)	"Not Ready to Make Nice" (2006)

"I Hope" is a country–pop song written and performed by the American all-female trio Dixie Chicks for their seventh studio album, Taking the Long Way, in 2006.

It was nominated for two Grammy Awards at the 48th ceremony, but lost in both categories.

== Song information ==
The song, written by all the three band members (Emily Robison, Martie Maguire, Natalie Maines) and Kevin Moore, received its debut performance on the Shelter from the Storm: A Concert for the Gulf Coast telethon on September 9, 2005. It was later made available as a digital download single with proceeds to benefit the Hurricane Katrina relief. The song features a guitar solo from John Mayer.

=== Comments about the song by band members ===
This is what band members Robison and Maines commented about the writing process of "I Hope":

- Robison: "Kevin was one of the last writers we wrote with, and it was so nice and so comfortable working with him. With what he's been through and where he grew up, it's important to him to write positive, uplifting songs."
- Maines: "On the other hand, he wasn't afraid to get political, and this ultimately turned out to be a pretty serious song. Hopeful and positive, but serious."

== Chart performance ==
Chart (2006)	Peak position
US Hot Country Songs (Billboard)	54

== Awards nominations ==
- 48th Grammy Awards:
  - Best Country Song
  - Best Country Performance by a Duo or Group with Vocal
