= John Mock =

- Born: Connecticut, U.S.
- Genres: Acoustic music, Irish music, Celtic music
- Occupation: Musician
- Instruments: guitar; concertina; Tin whistle; mandolin; bodhrán; harmonium; bouzouki; recorder; Cajun accordion
- Years active: 1991–present
- Labels: Green Hill, Spring Hill, SoundArt
- Website: www.johnmock.net

John Mock is an American multi-instrumentalist, composer, arranger, producer, and photographer with a particular interest in the topic of maritime history and culture.

== Biography ==
=== Early years ===
Mock is a native of Connecticut’s eastern shore. His father was in the Coast Guard in New London, Connecticut, and Mock grew to love the ocean and shoreline. Mock began playing guitar at age 15. When he visited Ireland at age 28, he started playing the tin whistle, and he took up the concertina in his 30s.

=== Studio work, composing, and arranging ===
Eventually, Mock left the Atlantic coast for Nashville, where he works as a composer, producer, arranger and instrumentalist. Studio and live credits include James Taylor, the Dixie Chicks, Rodney Crowell, Ricky Skaggs and Kentucky Thunder, Dolly Parton, Randy Travis, Sylvia, Kathy Mattea, Nanci Griffith, Tim O'Brien, Mark O'Connor, Gretchen Peters, Maura O'Connell, Lady Antebellum, Martina McBride, Sara Evans, and many others.

His orchestral arrangements have been performed by the London Symphony Orchestra and the National Symphony Orchestra, as well as the symphonies of Atlanta and Nashville. His work "The Stone" was included on the Nashville Chamber Orchestra's 1997 Warner Bros, Debut.

Mock’s film scoring credits include the 2017 SONY/Affirm film “All Saints” (written with Conni Ellisor) starring John Corbett, Barry Corbin, and Cara Buono. John's music can also be heard in the independent film “The Otherworld”.

The Dixie Chicks performed Mock's arrangement of "The Star-Spangled Banner" at Super Bowl XXXVII.

=== From The Shoreline ===
Mock has toured extensively to stage his concert presentation From the Shoreline, which uses multimedia to celebrate the Atlantic coastline from New England to Ireland. He performs original compositions on guitar, concertina, mandolin, tin whistle and other instruments and integrates projections of his own photographs of castles, lighthouses, and ships, taken during his travels to New England, Ireland, and Scotland.

In 2013, Mock was recognized by the American Lighthouse Foundation (ALF) as an artist advocate. He launched the Keeper’s House Concert Series to benefit the ALF and to promote the appreciation and preservation of lighthouses.

=== Collaborations ===
Since 1996, Mock has been producing and arranging for ACM Female Vocalist of the Year Sylvia, and leads her band on tour as well. He has co-written many of her songs. Their albums together include:

- The Real Story (1996)
- Where In The World (2002)
- A Cradle In Bethlehem (2002)
- It’s All In The Family (2016)
- Second Bloom – The Hits Re-Imagined (2018)

Mock’s long association with Maura O'Connell has included recording, touring throughout the US and Ireland, and extensive work creating orchestral arrangements of her songs.

In 1998, Mock and the late Butch Baldassari released Cantabile: Duets for Mandolin and Guitar, both as a CD and a book of music transcriptions. In 2007, they recorded Music of O'Carolan, a tribute to Irish composer Turlough O'Carolan. Both albums are on Baldassari's SoundArt label.

=== Other projects ===
Mock contributed bodhrán, low whistle, and penny whistle to the soundtrack for Liberty! The American Revolution spearheaded by Mark O'Connor, Yo Yo Ma, and James Taylor.

He also worked with Ma on Heartland: An Appalachian Anthology along with O'Connor, Edgar Meyer, Sam Bush, and others.

Mock has recorded numerous albums of Irish and Colonial American instrumental music for Green Hill Music of Nashville.

== Discography ==
=== Solo albums ===
- 2005: The Day at Sea (self-released)
- 2011: Keeper's Companion (self-released)

=== As producer ===
- 1996: Sylvia - The Real Story (Red Pony)
- 2002: Sylvia - Where In The World (Red Pony)
- 2002: Sylvia - A Cradle In Bethlehem (Red Pony)
- 2008: Thom Schuyler – Prayer of a Desperate Man
- 2009: Craig Bickhardt – Brother To The Wind (Stone Barn)
- 2014: Craig Bickhardt - The More I Wonder (Stone Barn)
- 2016: Sylvia - It's All in the Family (Red Pony)
- 2018: Sylvia – Second Bloom – The Hits Re-Imagined (Red Pony)
- 2018: Thom Shuyler – The Banks of Jordan

=== As sideman ===
- 1991: Kathy Mattea - Time Passes By (Polygram) – guitar
- Kathy Mattea - Willow In The Wind By (Polygram) – classical guitar on “Where've You Been”
- 1995: Nashville Mandolin Ensemble - Plectrasonics (CMH) - mandolin
- 1995: Maura O'Connell - Stories (Hannibal) – tin whistle
- 1997: Mark O'Connor - Liberty! The American Revolution: Original Television Soundtrack (Sony Classical) - pennywhistle, bodhrán, low whistle, recorder
- 1998: Nanci Griffith: Other Voices, Too (A Trip Back to Bountiful) (Elektra) – tin whistle
- 1998: Michael W. Smith - Live the Life (Reunion) – tin whistle on track 12,Hello, Goodbye
- 1998: Twila Paris - Perennial (Songs For The Seasons Of Life) (Sparrow) – tin whistle
- 1999: Tanya Savory - Town to Town (Philo) - tin whistle, concertina
- 1999: Martina McBride - Emotion (RCA) - tin whistle, low whistle
- 1999: Tim O'Brien - The Crossing (Alula) - percussion, low whistle
- 1999: Nanci Griffith with the London Symphony Orchestra - The Dust Bowl Symphony (Elektra) – orchestral arranger, acoustic guitar, tin whistle
- 2000: David Davidson - Celtic Fantasy (Green Hill) - concertina, bodhrán, guitar, tin whistle
- 2001: Dolly Parton - Little Sparrow (Sugar Hill) – tin whistle, harmonium
- 2001: Joshua Bell , Sam Bush , Béla Fleck , Yo-Yo Ma , Mike Marshall , Edgar Meyer , Mark O'Connor , James Taylor, and Alison Krauss - Heartland: An Appalachian Anthology (Sony Classical) - tin whistle, low whistle
- 2002: Dixie Chicks - Home (Monument) - percussion, bodhrán, uilleann pipes, tin whistle, string arrangements
- 2003: Martina McBride - Martina (RCA) - tin whistle on track 1, So Magical
- 2003: Sara Evans - Restless (RCA Nashville) - tin whistle, concertina
- 2003: Dixie Chicks - Top of the World Tour: Live (Monument) - acoustic guitar, tin whistle, concertina, percussion, papoose guitar, string arrangement for “Top Of The World”
- 2004: Peter Cetera – You Just Gotta Love Christmas – tin whistle, low whistles
- 2004: Selah - Hiding Place (Curb) – tin whistle
- 2005: various artists - Happy Land: Musical Tributes to Laura Ingalls Wilder (Pa's Fiddle) - track 10, Oft in the Stilly Night (accompanying Deborah Packard on guitar)
- 2007: Butch Baldassari - The Vespa Love Festival Sessions (CD Baby)
- 2007: Donna Ulisse - When I Look Back (Hadley) - tin whistle, concertina, harmonium
- 2007: Gretchen Peters - Burnt Toast & Offerings (Scarlet Letter) - concertina, tin whistle on track 10, This Town
- 2008: Peter Corry - Sounds of the Soul (self-released) - concertina
- 2008: Janet McLaughlin - Shine In The Moon (Muddy Paw) - acoustic guitar, low whistle, tin whistle, concertina
- 2008: Dolly Parton - Backwoods Barbie (Dolly) - tin whistle, bodhrán, harmonium on track 6, Only Dreamin'
- 2008: The Waybacks - Loaded (Compass) – tin whistle
- 2008: Sara Evans – Born To Fly/Restless – tin whistle, concertina
- 2009: John Cowan - Comfort and Joy (eOne) - guitar, tin whistle
- 2011: Craig Duncan - Irish Country Christmas (Green Hill) - tin whistle, bodhrán, guitar
- 2011: Kathy Troccoli - Christmas Songs (Green Hill) - bouzouki, guitar, low whistle
- 2012: Anna Ternheim - The Night Visitor (V2 Records) - tin whistle on track 8, God Don't Know
- 2013: Dawn McCarthy and Bonnie and Prince; Billy - What the Brothers Sang (Drag City) - mandolin, harmonium
- 2013: Craig Campbell - Never Regret (Bigger Picture) - harmonium
- 2014: Jim Hendricks and Jeff Lisenby - Celtic Heritage: Favorite Irish, Scottish and Old English Melodies (Green Hill) - guitar, mandolin
- 2014: Dolly Parton – Blue Smoke - harmonium
- 2015: Tom Paxton - Redemption Road (Pax) – tin whistle
- 2016: Alan Jackson – Precious Memories Collection - Harmonium, tin whistle, uilleann pipes
- 2017: The Westies - Six On the Out (Audio & Video Labs) – tin whistle
- 2017: Lady Antebellum – Gentle Giant: The Songs of Don Williams – string arrangement and guitar solo on “We've Got A Good Fire Going”

=== As arranger ===
- 1991: Kathy Mattea - Time Passes By (Polygram) - string arrangements
- 1995: George Ducas - George Ducas (Liberty / Capitol) - mandolin arrangements
- 1995: October Project - Falling Farther In (Epic) - track 8, "One Dream"
- 1996: Lambchop - How I Quit Smoking (Merge) - song arrangements
- 1996: Nashville Mandolin Ensemble - Gifts (Sony Music)
- 1997: Silvain Vanot - Egérie (Labels) - string arrangements
- 1998: Hal Bynum - If I Could Do Anything (Warner Bros.) - guitar
- 1998: Michael W. Smith - Live the Life (Reunion) - woodwind arrangements
- 1999: Nanci Griffith with the London Symphony Orchestra - The Dust Bowl Symphony (Elektra) - song arrangements
- 2002: Dixie Chicks - Home (Monument) - track 12, "Top Of The World"
- 2002: Sylvia - A Cradle In Bethlehem (Red Pony) - all string arrangements
- 2003: Dixie Chicks - Top of the World Tour: Live (Monument) - cello arrangements, string arrangements
- 2016: Sylvia - It's All in the Family (Red Pony) - all string arrangements
- 2018: Sylvia – Second Bloom – The Hits Re-Imagined (Red Pony) - all string arrangements
