= Top of the World (Dixie Chicks song) =

2003 single by the Dixie Chicks

Song by Patty Griffin

from the album Impossible Dream
- Released: April 20, 2004
- Genre: Contemporary folk, country
- Length: 5:28
- Label: A&M
- Songwriter: Patty Griffin
- Producer: Craig Ross

"Top of the World"

Single by Dixie Chicks

from the album Home
- Released: September 2003
- Genre: Country
- Length: 6:01
- Label: Columbia Nashville
- Songwriter: Patty Griffin
- Producers: Dixie Chicks, Lloyd Maines

Dixie Chicks singles chronology
"Godspeed (Sweet Dreams)" (2003)	"Top of the World" (2003)	"I Hope" (2005)

"Top of the World" is a contemporary folk-country song written by Patty Griffin and most known as recorded and performed in Grammy Award-winning fashion by the Dixie Chicks.

Griffin wrote and recorded "Top of the World" in 2000 for Silver Bell, but a dispute with her label A&M Records caused Griffin to be dropped and the album to go unreleased for 13 years. In the meantime, copies of Silver Bell circulated and increased Griffin's reputation as a songwriter within the music industry.

The Dixie Chicks had already covered other Griffin songs and had toured with Griffin on their 2000 Fly Tour. They recorded two Silver Bell songs, "Truth No. 2" and "Top of the World," for their 2002 album Home, the latter as the concluding track. Beginning quietly with Home's mixture of acoustic stringed instruments, and with the vocal line shifting around among one-, two-, and three-part singing, "Top of the World" begins by portraying an almost unbearable level of regret at things not done.

Tension is built up with pauses, then midway through a string section begins accompanying in an ominous fashion as the reason for the regret is unveiled. The strings then pick up in intensity during the instrumental coda, as Chicks lead singer Natalie Maines moans wordlessly and then repeats "To the top of the world" as a mantra over and over.

Dixie Chick Emily Robison said of "Top of the World" that it was the "biggest departure on the album, but I'm so glad that we did it because I think it shows a whole other dimension." During their 2002 concert film An Evening with the Dixie Chicks, Maines attempted to explain the song's startlingly unusual perspective:

It is written from the point of view of a man who has passed on, and he's sort of looking down wishing that he had been a different person, and having a lot of regrets and wishing he hadn't had the negative effect on the people in his life and err... I don't know what I just said...

Author Chris Willman wrote that this was "a song that could send a chill down even a seasoned spine after repeat listens." Entertainment Weekly stated that the Dixie Chicks' recording "lift[ed] the quality of [the song] in a way [its] author herself could not." The New York Times said that "Top of the World" was an example of the Dixie Chicks turning to Griffin for their most ambitious material that at the same time led to the Chicks' commercial and critical success.

"Top of the World" was released as a single in mid-2003, together with a music video, but failed to chart. At six minutes the song was likely too long for radio, but by then the infamous controversy regarding Maines' criticism of U.S. President George W. Bush had broken out, and the Chicks had become a country radio anathema.

Maines would remark of the video, "We haven't been banned from television yet." Directed by Sophie Muller and filmed in London, it portrayed the three Chicks as three women in different stages of the protagonist's life. The story started with a boy growing up with his single mother (Emily Robison), who frequently abused and neglected him. As a result, he would become frustrated with his life and in turn mutilate inanimate objects such as a rag doll. Later, the boy grew up as a bitter person and never became close to his daughter and wife (Martie Maguire). When he became old, and his daughter (Natalie Maines) grew up, she loved and took care of him like her mother did when she was little. The old man died feeling regretful about his life, but the cycle was broken when Natalie raised and loved a good family in her generation. The video premiered on VH1 on September 22, 2003, and it would later be nominated for MVPA Awards in the Adult Contemporary Video and Director of the Year categories.

Although not one of the Chicks' big hits, the song was prominent enough that the trio's 2003 Top of the World Tour was named after it, as were the subsequent Top of the World Tour: Live album and Top of the World Tour: Live DVD. Indeed, "Top of the World" was one of the emotional centerpieces of the shows on the tour, and the live recording of the song would go on to win the 2005 Grammy Award for Best Country Performance by a Duo or Group with Vocal. The song remained one of the highlights of the group's 2006 Accidents & Accusations Tour, with violinist Martie Maguire moving from the front of the stage to join the band's violin and cello player for a dramatic, elongated string part during the coda.

Griffin's own re-recording of "Top of the World" would finally surface for good on her 2004 album Impossible Dream. As the Dixie Chicks' version had been close in arrangement to Griffin's original, Griffin re-arranged it this time around. It featured the violin of Lisa Germano, and Allmusic described the recording's "quietly intense relationship meditation" as reaching an "aching climax". The Washington Post wrote that Griffin's recording would have "flooded the country airwaves" were it not for "music business realities". and again in 2013 when Silver Bell was finally released by A&M Records and Universal Music Enterprises.

"Top of the World" has been performed by others as well, notably Jessica Harp of The Wreckers, Kelly Clarkson, and Australian singers Jasmine Rae and Kasey Chambers.
