= Shelter from the Storm: A Concert for the Gulf Coast =

2005 benefit concert television special

Shelter from the Storm: A Concert for the Gulf Coast was a one-hour, commercial-free benefit concert television special that aired simulcast worldwide on September 9, 2005, at 8 p.m. ET/CT live (with a 30-second tape delay) from New York City and Los Angeles and tape delayed in the Mountain Time Zone and Pacific Time Zones. The special raised money for the relief efforts from the aftermath of Hurricane Katrina. It was broadcast in over 100 different countries. All proceeds went to the American Red Cross and The Salvation Army.

== Production ==
The concert was a cooperative and collaborative global effort between ABC, CBS, NBC, Fox, UPN, and The WB. Several cable stations have also cleared space for the concert. It featured appearances and musical performances by celebrities from the world of film, television and music. Approximately $30 million was raised for the American Red Cross and The Salvation Army.

The event was produced by Joel Gallen and followed closely in the footprints of the 9/11 benefit concert, America: A Tribute to Heroes, which Gallen also produced. It featured performances by popular musicians along with commentary by various actors and other celebrities. Celebrities also answered phone calls to help collect donations.

== Musical guests and performances ==
- Randy Newman, "Louisiana 1927"
- U2 with Mary J. Blige, "One" (recorded earlier that day in Toronto)
- Alicia Keys with Alvin Slaughter, Shirley Caesar and Bishop Eric McDaniel: Gospel Medley: "Remember Me", Come by Here, My Lord" and "We Need To Hear From You"
- Neil Young, "When God Made Me"
- Foo Fighters, "Born on the Bayou"
- Mariah Carey, "Fly Like a Bird"
- Paul Simon, "Take Me to the Mardi Gras"
- unknown New Orleans jazz band, coda
- Dixie Chicks with Mike Campbell and Robert Randolph, "I Hope"
- Kelly Clarkson, "Shelter"
- Sheryl Crow, "The Water Is Wide"
- Rod Stewart with Jerry Lawson & Talk of the Town, "People Get Ready"
- Kanye West, "Jesus Walks"
- Garth Brooks with Trisha Yearwood and Paul Shaffer, "Who'll Stop the Rain"
- Dr. John, "Walkin' to New Orleans"

Spoken appearances were made by Bruce Willis, Julia Roberts, Don Cheadle, Jennifer Aniston, Jack Black, Cameron Diaz, Ellen DeGeneres, Morgan Freeman, Jack Nicholson, Chris Rock, Ray Romano, and Sela Ward.

Phones were answered by Ben Affleck, Jason Alexander, Jennifer Aniston, Sean Astin, Angela Bassett, Jack Black, Adrien Brody, Don Cheadle, Michael Chiklis, Ellen DeGeneres, Benicio del Toro, Danny DeVito, Cameron Diaz, Jennifer Garner, Sarah Michelle Gellar, Randy Jackson, Allison Janney, Christine Lahti, Reba McEntire, Mandy Moore, Jack Nicholson, Jeremy Piven, Emily Procter, Dennis Quaid, Julia Roberts, The Rock, Ray Romano, Doug Savant, Jimmy Smits, Mary Steenburgen, Nia Vardalos, Sela Ward, Bruce Willis, Alfre Woodard, and James Woods.

The program was released on DVD by 20th Century Fox on December 6, 2005.

This program is not to be confused with A Concert for Hurricane Relief, which NBC aired by itself the previous Friday night, September 2. It was on that show that Kanye West commented on President George W. Bush's handling of the disaster.

== Broadcast networks ==
=== United States ===
==== Broadcasters ====
- ABC
- CBS
- Fox
- I
- NBC
- PBS
- UPN
- The WB

==== Cable and satellite ====
- ABC Family
- AmericanLife TV Network
- Black Family Channel
- CNBC
- Court TV
- E!
- Fox College Sports
- Fox Movie Channel
- Fox Reality Channel
- FSN
- Fuel TV
- FX
- G4 Media
- GSN
- Lifetime
- MSNBC
- Ovation TV
- Oxygen
- Showtime
- Sirius Satellite Radio
- SOAPnet
- SPEED Channel
- Style Network
- Superstation WGN
- TBS
- Tennis Channel
- Trio
- TV Guide Network
- TV One
- USA Network
- Wealth TV

=== Canada ===
- A Channel
- Bravo!
- CTV
- CBC Television
- Citytv
- Global Television Network

=== Other foreign ===
- MediaCorp Channel 5 (Singapore)
- Sky One (United Kingdom)

== See also ==
- List of highest-grossing benefit concerts
