= Not Ready to Make Nice =

2006 single by The Chicks

Single by The Chicks

from the album Taking the Long Way
- Released: March 20, 2006
- Genre: Country; country rock; alternative country
- Length: 3:58
- Label: Columbia Nashville
- Songwriters: Martie Maguire; Natalie Maines; Emily Robison; Dan Wilson
- Producer: Rick Rubin

The Chicks singles chronology
| "I Hope" (2005) | "Not Ready to Make Nice" (2006) | "Everybody Knows" (2006) |

Music video
- "Not Ready to Make Nice" on YouTube

"Not Ready to Make Nice"
The Chicks' "Not Ready to Make Nice" from Taking the Long Way

"Not Ready to Make Nice" is a song co-written and performed by American country music trio The Chicks. It was released on March 20, 2006, as the first single from the band's seventh studio album, Taking the Long Way. The Chicks wrote the song in response to the backlash they experienced in 2003 after criticizing President George W. Bush.

"Not Ready to Make Nice" remains The Dixie Chicks' biggest hit in Canada. Though they have had bigger hits on the country charts, it is their only song to be certified 2× Platinum, reaching number four on the Hot 100. The song was written by Natalie Maines, Martie Maguire, Emily Robison, and Dan Wilson.

On February 11, 2007, it won three Grammy Awards in the categories of Record of the Year, Song of the Year, and Best Country Performance by a Duo or Group with Vocal. In 2009, Rolling Stone named "Not Ready to Make Nice" the 77th best song of the decade.

== Background ==
Controversy erupted over The Dixie Chicks in 2003 following a critical comment vocalist Natalie Maines made about American President George W. Bush while performing in a concert in London, United Kingdom. In relation to the forthcoming invasion of Iraq, Maines said, "...we don't want this war, this violence, and we're ashamed that the President of the United States is from Texas."

Taking the Long Way was the first studio album released by The Dixie Chicks following the controversy, the band's reaction to which forms the major theme of some of the songs in the album. Most notable among these is "Not Ready to Make Nice", which was written by all three band members (Maines, Emily Robison and Martie Maguire) along with Dan Wilson, as an expression of band's reaction to the banning of their songs from country music radio stations, and their thoughts on freedom of speech.

The band went on to the October 25 episode of The Oprah Winfrey Show to promote the documentary film Shut Up and Sing and the music video of the song was quickly shown. While interviewing the band, Winfrey said the song is so well written that someone cannot even tell if it concerns the controversy. Indeed, Maines said that she and the other songwriters wanted the song to have a universal interpretation.

=== Comments by band members ===
The band members released their comments about writing the songs of Taking the Long Way through the website Frontpage Publicity. They commented the following about "Not Ready to Make Nice":

- Emily: "The stakes were definitely higher on that song. We knew it was special because it was so autobiographical, and we had to get it right. We've all gone through so many emotions about the incident. We talked for days with Dan before putting pen to paper, and he really helped get inside our heads and put these feelings out. And once we had this song done, it freed us up to do the rest of the album without that burden."
- Martie: "We had reached a point where we were laughing a lot about it, and people didn't really know how far it had gone. I realized I had suppressed a lot about the death threat. It all came flooding back in the process of writing this song, I think we all realized just how painful it had been for us.."
- Natalie: "We tried to write about the incident a few times, but you get nervous that you're being too preachy or too victimized or too nonchalant. Dan came in with an idea that was some kind of concession, more 'can't we all just get along?' and I said, nope, I can't say that, can't do it. And we talked about it, and he said, what about "I'm not ready to make nice?" From the outside, normal people really weren't aware of how bizarre and absurd it got. Dan was really good at cluing in to that, saying something that didn't back down, but still had a vulnerability to it. This album was therapy. To write these songs allowed me to find peace with everything and move on."

== Music video ==
The music video for "Not Ready to Make Nice" was filmed on March 9, 2006, and directed by Sophie Muller. The video starts with a scene of Natalie painting the white clothes of the other two band members, Martie and Emily, with black paint, which symbolizes the boycott of the band. Then, Natalie is seen wearing a black dress with her hands on a puddle of black paint. In another scene, the band members are sitting in a chair and when Natalie gets up to say something, Martie and Emily pull her back in to the chair. Then, Natalie and the other Chicks are seen in an environment that looks like a classroom and the teacher sends Natalie to write the English proverb "To talk without thinking is to shoot without aiming" on the blackboard. On the final scenes of the video, Natalie is seen in front of three doctors in what appears to be a mental institution, trying to escape from them. The video ends with a close shot of Natalie.

The music video of the song broke the record as the longest run at #1 on VH1's VSpot Top 20 Countdown spending 15 weeks at the top, 14 of them consecutive. The video also became the second ever to retire to the 20/20 club on the show on 7 October 2006, when it was at #9 on the countdown. In December 2006, it was named one of the best videos of the year by VH1. "Not Ready to Make Nice" was ranked #36 on CMT's 2008 ranking of the 100 Greatest Videos.

=== MADtv parody ===
The Fox late-night sketch show MADtv performed a parody of the "Not Ready to Make Nice" music video. In the parody, Crista Flanagan portrays Natalie Maines as standing by her comments about George W. Bush; however, her bandmates, portrayed by Nicole Parker and Arden Myrin, want to apologize so they can remain popular in the United States. Flanagan, as Maines, states that there is no God, she supports radical Islamic Jihad, and that every woman should wear a burqa. In the parody, Flanagan writes on a blackboard, "I am angry and important". In the parody, Flanagan is lobotimized and her bandmates toast the operation; whereas in the original, Maines resists being treated by doctors and is toasted by her bandmates.

== Critical reception ==
"Not Ready to Make Nice" received universal acclaim from contemporary music critics of publications like Allmusic, Entertainment Weekly, Rolling Stone and USA Today. The song has been praised by these critics for being a statement in which the band does not regret Maines' anti-Bush statement. Allmusic reviewer Stephen Thomas Erlewine wrote that "Given the controversy of 2003, the conscious distancing from country makes sense — and given songs like the defiant 'Not Ready to Make Nice', the Dixie Chicks don't sound like they're in retreat on Taking the Long Way; they merely sound like they're being themselves." Entertainment Weekly music reviewer David Browne said that "If you wonder whether they have regrets about the incident, 'Not Ready to Make Nice' makes it clear they don't. When Maines gets to the part about all the death threats, her voice rises and the strings well up; it's a true pop-money-shot moment." Rolling Stone music reviewer Barry Walters commented the following about the song, "Rather than try to forget about singer Natalie Maines' anti-Bush remarks of 2003 -- which landed them in hot water with a lot of station program directors -- the threesome declares it's still 'Not Ready to Make Nice'." USA Today music reviewer Brian Mansfield commented the following about the song, "They're 'Not Ready to Make Nice' with the yahoos who threatened their lives over an offhanded comment. So give the Dixie Chicks credit for sticking to their guns, and give them more for getting on with life." PopMatters said, "This is not to say that Taking the Long Way is a record of vindication; rather, it’s one of melancholy, veiled rage and, more than anything, disbelief. “How in the world can the words that I said / Send somebody so over the edge / That they’d write me a letter sayin’ that I’d better shut up and sing / Or my life will be over”, Maines howls in the controversial and largely ignored-by-radio first single, “Not Ready to Make Nice”, where producer Rick Rubin strips away everything but guitar and Maines’ surprisingly tenuous voice, as he’s done with a few other guys you might know. There’s an undercurrent of distrust over the war, sure, but they leave the specifics on Iraq alone, having already said their piece pretty loudly. The focus is more on that exile, the death threats, the astoundingly (if predictably) bombastic response they got from country radio and its notoriously red-leaning fans. “I’m through with doubt, there’s nothing left for me to figure out / I paid a price, and I’ll keep paying”, Maines goes on, with a calculated but somewhat weary sense of defiance. “It’s too late to make it right”, she continues, “I probably wouldn’t if I could”." Amazon called the song "defiant" and said that the Chicks "still smart over the backlash from their 2003 Bushwhacking." The Austin Chronicle said that the song "reacts to the uproar over Maines’ comments about President Bush with remarkable potency". E! Online said that the song "[rings] with defiance". Stylus Magazine said, "there’s plenty of defiance to be found throughout, on the already-infamous single “Not Ready to Make Nice”". Blender stated, "On the first single, 'Not Ready to Make Nice,' written by the band and Dan Wilson, Maines sings, 'Forgive, sounds good / Forget, I'm not sure I could.' [Taking the Long Way] has some of what was missing from Home: fire, ugliness, resentment. 'Not Ready to Make Nice' works not because Maines sounds righteous, but because she sounds bitter: 'It's too late to make it right / I probably wouldn't if I could,' she sings; this isn't about Bush, it's about pride." The Village Voice's Pazz & Jop annual critics' poll voted "Not Ready to Make Nice" as the eighth best single of 2006.

Kevin Forest Moreau of ShakingThrough.net, however, said that he "began to wish that the Chicks and producer Rick Rubin (yes, that Rick Rubin) had chosen to let the music match the vitriol in" the song. The A.V. Club said, "Dixie Chicks are still pissed. Three years after being hung out to dry by a neo-conservative country-music community that once embraced Merle Haggard and Johnny Cash, the pop-bluegrass trio has returned with a new album and new confidence, now that Natalie Maines' once-scandalous dismissal of George W. Bush has begun to mirror the opinion polls. Taking The Long Way's lead single, "Not Ready To Make Nice," is practically one long "told you so," and though it's too maudlin by half, there's something refreshingly honest about the song's we're-not-sorry sentiment. And it's far from the only dose of vinegar on the record." The Guardian said that the song's chorus "rattles vengefully along".

== Live performances history ==
To promote both the single and the album, The Dixie Chicks performed the song live on some television programs such as on The Ellen DeGeneres Show, Good Morning America, Late Show with David Letterman, among others. It was also performed to internet radios such as Sessions@AOL and LAUNCHcast. It was performed in every single concert of the band's Accidents & Accusations Tour (June 15–December 5, 2006). It was also performed at the 49th Grammy Awards, just minutes before the band won the awards for Song of the Year and Record of the Year. (In a nod to the controversial origins of the song, Grammy producers had longtime singer-activist Joan Baez introduce the performance.)

== Chart and sales performance ==
"Not Ready to Make Nice" initially peaked at number 23 on the Billboard Hot 100 chart, becoming the first song by the band to chart in the US after the 2003 controversy and their last top ten hit. It was able to chart in the Billboard Hot 100 because of a high number of download sales (it debuted at number 11 and peaked at number eight on the Hot Digital Songs chart), despite low country radio airplay.

For the issue dated March 3, 2007, in the wake of its Grammy success, the song re-entered the Hot 100 at number four, after a 20-week absence, becoming the band's highest-charting single to date on the general music charts. That same week, the song would also receive a Gold certification from the Recording Industry Association of America for digital downloads of over 500,000. However, its drop to number 28 in the next week broke the record for the biggest drop out of the top five in a single week, beating Clay Aiken's "Solitaire", which fell from number four to number 27 four years earlier. The song was certified Platinum in the United States on July 20, 2013, and as of March 2020, the song has sold 2,000,000 digital copies in the US.

The song was also very popular in Canada, where it peaked at number three on the BDS chart. It also became a top 20 hit in Australia, becoming the second single of the band to chart on the ARIA chart, at number 18. In the United Kingdom, the song charted poorly on the UK Singles Chart, peaking at number 70; however, it became the fourth single by the band to chart in that country.

== Charts ==
=== Weekly charts ===
| Chart (2006–2007) | Peak position |
|---|---|
| Australia (ARIA) | 18 |
| Canada (Nielsen SoundScan) | 3 |
| German Singles Chart | 89 |
| Irish Singles Chart | 47 |
| Netherlands (Single Top 100) | 77 |
| Sweden Top 40 | 20 |
| Swiss Singles Chart | 22 |
| UK Singles Chart | 70 |
| US Billboard Hot 100 | 4 |
| US Hot Country Songs (Billboard) | 36 |
| US Adult Pop Airplay (Billboard) | 29 |
| US Adult Contemporary (Billboard) | 32 |

=== Year-end charts ===
| Chart (2006) | Position |
|---|---|
| Australia (ARIA) | 96 |
| Chart (2007) | Position |
| Australia (ARIA) | 98 |

== Certifications ==
Certifications
| Region | Certification | Certified units/sales |
|---|---|---|
| Australia (ARIA) | 3× Platinum | 210,000^{‡} |
| Canada (Music Canada) | Platinum | 40,000^{*} |
| New Zealand (RMNZ) | Platinum | 30,000^{‡} |
| United States (RIAA) | 2× Platinum | 2,000,000^{‡} / 1,705,000 |
| United States (RIAA) Mastertone | Gold | 500,000^{*} |
^{*} Sales figures based on certification alone.^{‡} Sales+streaming figures based on certification alone.

== Awards ==
2007 CMT Music Awards:

- Video of the Year (nominated)
- Group Video of the Year (nominated)

49th Grammy Awards:

- Record of the Year (won)
- Song of the Year (won)
- Best Country Performance by a Duo or Group with Vocal (won)
