= The Long Way Around =

Single by Dixie Chicks

from the album Taking the Long Way
- Released: January 8, 2007
- Genre: Country
- Length: 4:33
- Label: Columbia Nashville
- Songwriter(s): Martie Maguire; Natalie Maines; Emily Robison; Dan Wilson
- Producer(s): Rick Rubin

Dixie Chicks singles chronology
"Everybody Knows" (2006)	"The Long Way Around" (2007)	"The Neighbor" (2007)

"The Long Way Around" (a.k.a. "Taking the Long Way Around") is a song written by Natalie Maines, Martie Maguire, Emily Robison and Dan Wilson and recorded by the American all-female trio Dixie Chicks for their seventh studio album, Taking the Long Way (2006). The song was the fifth and final single released from the album.

The song is the opening track of Taking the Long Way and provides the album its title, which derives from the chorus.

About the writing process of the song, Robison said, "That's a journey song, about the different stages in our lives. A recap of where we've been, where we're going - and it was nice to remind ourselves of all that." Maines said, "We've always written songs that are about other people. It's so much harder to put yourself out there and be honest with your emotions and your beliefs, but the songs are so much better and mean so much more when you can let yourself be vulnerable."

== Critical response ==
"The Long Way Around" received unanimous critical acclaim. It was ranked as the 20th best song of 2006 by Rolling Stone magazine, which called it "a heart-tugging guitar anthem for small-town girls with big dreams -- and the best ersatz Springsteen song in a year that was packed with them".
