= Home (Dixie Chicks album) =

Studio album by Dixie Chicks
- Released: August 27, 2002
- Recorded: 2001–02
- Studio: Cedar Creek Recording
- Genres: Bluegrass; country; Americana; folk
- Length: 51:42
- Labels: Open Wide; Monument; Columbia Nashville
- Producers: Dixie Chicks; Lloyd Maines

Dixie Chicks chronology
Fly (1999)	Home (2002)	Top of the World Tour: Live (2003)

Dixie Chicks studio album chronology
Fly (1999)	Home (2002)	Taking the Long Way (2006)

Alternative cover
- Deluxe edition cover

Singles from Home
- 1. "Long Time Gone" Released: May 23, 2002; 2. "Landslide" Released: August 26, 2002; 3. "Travelin' Soldier" Released: December 9, 2002; 4. "Godspeed (Sweet Dreams)" Released: May 22, 2003; 5. "Top of the World" Released: September 2003

Home is the sixth studio album by American country music band Dixie Chicks, released on August 27, 2002, through Monument and Columbia Records. It is notable for its acoustic bluegrass sound, which stands in contrast with their previous two country pop albums.

While touring for the album, the Dixie Chicks publicly criticized the US president, George W. Bush, triggering a backlash. The third single, "Travelin' Soldier", was #1 on the Billboard Country Chart the week that Maines' comments hit the press. The following week, as many stations started a still-standing boycott of the Chicks' music, the song collapsed. None of their following singles gained traction with country radio. Despite these events, the album was certified 6× Multi-platinum status by the RIAA and has sold 5,979,000 copies in the United States up to November 2008. The album also featured a cover of Fleetwood Mac's "Landslide", which was their biggest pop crossover hit until 2007, when "Not Ready to Make Nice" peaked at #4 on the Billboard Hot 100. The album was also successful in Australia, in its 175th week in the country charts it was certified Triple Platinum for shipments of 210,000 copies.

The album was nominated at the 45th Grammy Awards for six awards, including their second attempt for Album of the Year. The group went home with four in 2003, including Best Country Album, Best Recording Package, Best Country Instrumental Performance for "Lil' Jack Slade", and Best Country Performance by a Duo or Group with Vocal for "Long Time Gone". Additionally, they were nominated for Best Engineered Album, Non-Classical and Darrell Scott was nominated for Best Country Song for Long Time Gone. Two years later, they were nominated and won Best Country Performance by a Duo or Group with Vocal, this time for "Top of the World". It debuted at #1 on the Billboard Top 200 Albums chart and stayed there for four non-consecutive weeks. It also debuted at #1 on the Billboard Top Country Albums, and stayed there for 12 non-consecutive weeks.

== Songs ==
"Landslide" was originally recorded by Fleetwood Mac in 1975. "Travelin' Soldier" was originally recorded by its writer, Bruce Robison, in 1996, and then in rewritten form, in 1999; Ty England also recorded the song in 1999. "Godspeed" was originally recorded by Radney Foster in 1999; his wife suggested sending it to the Dixie Chicks because Natalie Maines had just had a baby. "Long Time Gone" and "More Love" were originally recorded by Darrell Scott in 2000. "Truth No. 2" and "Top of the World" were originally recorded by Patty Griffin for Silver Bell, a 2000 album that went unreleased until 2013, although the latter song was rerecorded by Griffin on 2004's Impossible Dream. "I Believe in Love" made its debut on the 2001 telethon America: A Tribute to Heroes.

== Singles ==
"Long Time Gone" was released on May 23, 2002 as the lead single from the record. It received positive reviews, with many critics noting the unique bluegrass and acoustic sound that was atypical of mainstream country music at the time. The song debuted at number 37 on the Hot Country Songs (then titled the "Hot Country Singles & Tracks") chart on June 8, 2002 and later rose up to its peak position of number two on August 24. The song also ended up peaking at number seven on the all-genre Billboard Hot 100, becoming the group's first top ten hit on the chart.

A cover of the Fleetwood Mac song, "Landslide" was released on August 26, 2002, as the second single from the album and the only one to be released to adult contemporary radio. The song was also the "Hot Shot Debut" of the week of September 7 (at country radio), debuting at number 32 and peaking at number two on the country charts on November 9. It also topped the Adult Contemporary chart, making it the group's only number one hit on that chart. It went to become the second top ten hit from the album on the Hot 100, peaking at number seven. The song also peaked within the top ten in Canada and Australia.

"Travelin' Soldier" was released on December 9, 2002 as the third single from Home. It was performed a year before its release at the 2001 CMA Awards, footage of which was later used as the song's music video. The song initially debuted on the country charts based solely on its live performance on February 16, 2002, at number 58, peaking at number 57. In its official release as a single, it re-entered the chart on December 14, 2002, at number 57. The song would go on to top the Hot Country Songs chart the week of March 22, 2003.

"Godspeed (Sweet Dreams)" was released on May 22, 2003, as the fourth single from the album. It debuted on the country charts at number 59 on June 7, 2003.

The album's fifth and final single, "Top of the World" was released in September 2003. The song was originally written by Patty Griffin, who had tried to record the song, but a dispute with her label led her to get dropped and the album project shelved.

== Reception ==
=== Critical ===
Professional ratings
Aggregate scores
Source	Rating
Metacritic	75/100
Review scores
Source	Rating
AllMusic	4.5/5 stars
The Austin Chronicle	2/5 stars
Blender	4/5 stars
Entertainment Weekly	A
Houston Chronicle	4/5
Los Angeles Times	3.5/4 stars
Pitchfork	8.1/10
Rolling Stone	2/5 stars
The Rolling Stone Album Guide	4/5 stars
USA Today	3.5/4 stars

The album received positive reviews. Metacritic gave the album an aggregated score of 75 (green label), indicating "generally favorable reviews".

Rhapsody ranked the album #1 on its list of "Country's Best Albums of the Decade". Another music blog, Country Universe, named it as the album of the decade. CMT's Craig Shelburne included it on his "A Dozen Favorite Country Albums of the Decade" list. Engine 145 country music blog lists it No. 4 on the "Top Country Albums of the Decade" list. Entertainment Weekly put the album on its end-of-the-decade, "best-of" list, saying: "Even George W. Bush fans have to respect the Chicks' authentic bluegrass sound on 'Long Time Gone' and 'Landslide'. Okay, maybe they don't. But they should." Allmusic said "They've delivered not just their best album, but what's arguably the best country album yet released in the 2000s. Needless to say, an instant classic."

=== Accolades ===
- Rhapsody – #1 on its "Country's Best Albums of the Decade" list
- Country Universe – #1 Country Album of the Decade
- Country Universe - #2 on its "100 Greatest Contemporary Country Albums" List
- CMT – "A Dozen Favorite Country Albums of the Decade" list
- Engine 145 – #4 on its "Top Country Albums of the Decade" list
- Entertainment Weekly – #6 Best Album of the Decade
- Entertainment Weekly - #2 on its "25 Essential Country Albums" list
- Entertainment Weekly = #85 on its "100 Best Albums from 1983-2008"
- Texas Music Magazine – #1 Album of the Decade
- BSC – #67 on its "Best Albums of the Decade" List
- CMT – #15 on its Top 40 Greatest Country Albums
- Taste of Country - #27 on its "100 Greatest Country Albums Ever"
- 9513 - #4 on its "Top Country Albums of the Decade" List

== Track listing ==
No.	Title	Writer(s)	Length
1.	"Long Time Gone"	Darrell Scott	4:10
2.	"Landslide"	Stevie Nicks	3:50
3.	"Travelin' Soldier"	Bruce Robison	5:43
4.	"Truth #2"	Patty Griffin	4:28
5.	"White Trash Wedding"	Martie Maguire; Natalie Maines; Emily Strayer	2:21
6.	"A Home"	Maia Sharp; Randy Sharp	4:56
7.	"More Love"	Gary Nicholson; Tim O'Brien	5:07
8.	"I Believe in Love"	Maguire; Maines; Marty Stuart	4:14
9.	"Tortured, Tangled Hearts"	Maguire; Maines; Stuart	3:40
10.	"Lil' Jack Slade" (instrumental)	Maguire; Strayer; Terri Hendrix; Lloyd Maines	2:23
11.	"Godspeed (Sweet Dreams)"	Radney Foster	4:42
12.	"Top of the World"	Griffin	6:01

U.S. Deluxe Edition Bonus Track
No.	Title	Writer(s)	Length
13.	"Landslide" (Sheryl Crow Remix)	Nicks	3:46

U.S. Deluxe Edition DVD
No.	Title	Length
1.	"Landslide" (Music Video)	3:46
2.	"Long Time Gone" (Music Video)	4:07
3.	"Goodbye Earl" (Music Video)	4:17
4.	"Wide Open Spaces" (Music Video)	3:44

International Bonus Track
No.	Title	Writer(s)	Length
13.	"Landslide" (Sheryl Crow Remix)	Nicks	3:46

Europe Deluxe Edition Bonus Tracks
No.	Title	Writer(s)	Length
13.	"Landslide" (Sheryl Crow Remix)	Nicks	3:46
14.	"Travelin' Soldier" (Re-Record)	Robison	5:09
15.	"Top Of The World" (The Greg Collins Remix)	Griffin	5:00

Europe Deluxe Edition DVD
No.	Title	Length
1.	"An Evening with the Dixie Chicks"	92:00

== Personnel ==
- Martie Maguire - fiddle, mandolin, viola, vocals
- Natalie Maines - vocals
- Emily Robison - banjo, Dobro, accordion, vocals, Papoose

Additional personnel

- Glenn Fukunaga - upright bass
- Emmylou Harris - vocals
- Byron House - upright bass
- Lloyd Maines - acoustic guitar, Weissenborn slide guitar, Papoose
- John Mock - percussion, bodhrán, uilleann pipes, tin whistle
- Sara Nelson - cello
- Paul Pearcy - percussion
- Adam Steffey - mandolin
- Bryan Sutton - acoustic guitar, baritone guitar, Papoose
- Chris Thile - mandolin, soloist

Production

- Producers: Dixie Chicks, Lloyd Maines
- Engineer: Gary Paczosa
- Assistant engineers: Thomas Johnson, Adam Odor, Fred Remmert
- Mixing: Gary Paczosa
- Mixing assistant: Eric Bickel
- Mastering: Robert Hadley, Doug Sax
- Production coordination: Mindi Pelletier
- String arrangements: John Mock
- Art direction: Kevin Reagan
- Design: Bret Healey, Kevin Reagan
- Photography: James Minchin
- Make-up: Candy Burton

== Charts ==
=== Weekly charts ===
Chart (2002–2003)	Peak position
Australian Albums Chart (ARIA)	4
Canadian Albums (Billboard)	2
US Billboard 200	1
US Top Country Albums (Billboard)	1

=== Year-end charts ===
Year-end chart performance for Home by Dixie Chicks
Chart (2002)	Position
Canadian Albums (Nielsen SoundScan)	20
Canadian Country Albums (Nielsen SoundScan)	4
US Billboard 200	22
US Top Country Albums (Billboard)	4
Worldwide Albums (IFPI)	15

Chart (2003)	Position
US Billboard 200	4
US Top Country Albums (Billboard)	2

=== Singles ===
Year	Single	Peak chart positions			
Year	Single	US Country	US	US AC	CAN
2002	"Long Time Gone"	2	7	—	—
2002	"Landslide"	2	7	1	2
2002	"Travelin' Soldier"	1	25	—	—
2003	"Godspeed (Sweet Dreams)"	48	—	—	—
2003	"Top of the World"	—	—	—	—

=== Other charted songs ===
Year	Single	Peak chart positions
Year	Single	US Country
2002	"White Trash Wedding"	56
2002	"Tortured, Tangled Hearts"	58

== Certifications ==
Region	Certification	Certified units/sales
Australia (ARIA)	4× Platinum	280,000^{‡}
Canada (Music Canada)	3× Platinum	300,000^{^}
Germany (BVMI)	Gold	150,000^{‡}
New Zealand (RMNZ)	Platinum	15,000^{^}
United Kingdom (BPI)	Gold	100,000^{^}
United States (RIAA)	6× Platinum	6,000,000^{^}
^{^} Shipments figures based on certification alone.^{‡} Sales+streaming figures based on certification alone.

== Awards ==
Grammy Awards

Year	Winner	Category
2003	Home	Best Country Album
2003	Home	Best Recording Package
2003	"Lil' Jack Slade"	Best Country Instrumental Performance
2003	"Long Time Gone"	Best Country Performance By A Duo Or Group With Vocal
2005	"Top of the World"(Live)	Best Country Performance By A Duo Or Group With Vocal
