= Travelin' Soldier =

2002 single by Dixie Chicks

Single by Dixie Chicks

from the album Home
- Released: December 9, 2002
- Genre: Country
- Length: 5:43
- Label: Columbia Nashville
- Songwriter: Bruce Robison
- Producers: Dixie Chicks; Lloyd Maines

Dixie Chicks singles chronology
"Landslide" (2002)	"Travelin' Soldier" (2002)	"Godspeed (Sweet Dreams)" (2003)

"Travelin' Soldier" is a song written and originally recorded by American country music artist Bruce Robison in 1996 and again, in rewritten form, in 1999. It was later recorded by Ty England on his 1999 album, Highways & Dance Halls. The first rendition to be issued as a single was by Dixie Chicks, who recorded the song for their third major label album Home (2002). It was released as the third single from the album on December 9, 2002. The group performed the song before its release at the 2001 Country Music Association Awards. It was recorded in 2021 by the group Home Free as part of their album, Land of the Free.

Receiving acclaim, "Travelin' Soldier" reached number 1 on the Billboard Hot Country Songs chart, then titled the "Hot Country Singles & Tracks" chart.

On November 7, 2025, country singer Cody Johnson released his cover of the song in honor of Veterans Day.

== Content ==
The song is a tale about a shy, lonesome, young American soldier who strikes up a conversation and later a correspondence with a young girl during the Vietnam War era. Americana details pervade the lyrics as the song details the correspondence as a relationship forms between the two, despite the insurmountable distance. The last letter from the soldier mentions that "it's gettin' kinda rough over here" and he "won't be able to write for a while" before skipping ahead to a football game at the girl's high school. After the anthem and the Lord's Prayer, the local soldiers who died in the war are announced. The soldier's name is on the list, but only the girl, who is there, recognizes his name. She mourns for him as stated in the line "One name read and nobody really cared but a pretty little girl with a bow in her hair."

A version of the song featuring Natalie Maines, Bruce Robison and Robison's wife, Kelly Willis, appears on KGSR's Broadcasts Vol. 13 album.

== Critical reception ==
Kevin John Coyne, reviewing the song for Country Universe, rated the song No. 17 on his list of the 201 Greatest Singles of the Decade. He stated that "it's the story between the lines that drives home the tragedy, as both main characters have a palpable sense of loneliness that they finally find relief from in one another just before they are ripped permanently apart."

In 2014, Rolling Stone ranked the song at number 150 on its 200 Greatest Country Songs of All Time ranking.

== Charts ==
The song debuted at No. 58 on the Hot Country Songs chart on February 16, 2002, based on a live recording from the Country Music Association telecast the previous November, eventually peaking at No. 57. It was not officially released as a single until late 2002, when it peaked at No. 1 on the same chart, in early 2003; additionally, the song charted within the Billboard top 40 of the Hot 100 chart, at the No. 25 spot.

=== Weekly charts ===
Chart (2002–2003)	Peak position
US Hot Country Songs (Billboard)	1
US Billboard Hot 100	25

=== Year-end charts ===
Chart (2003)	Position
US Country Songs (Billboard)	48

== Certifications ==
Certifications
Region	Certification	Certified units/sales
New Zealand (RMNZ)	Platinum	30,000^{‡}
United Kingdom (BPI)	Silver	200,000^{‡}
United States (RIAA)	Platinum	1,000,000^{‡}
^{‡} Sales+streaming figures based on certification alone.

== Cody Johnson version ==
"Travelin' Soldier"

Promotional single by Cody Johnson
- Released: November 7, 2025
- Genre: Country
- Length: 4:15
- Label: Warner Music Nashville
- Songwriter: Bruce Robison

Audio video
- "Travelin' Soldier" on YouTube

On November 7, 2025, American country singer Cody Johnson released his cover of the song in honor of the Veterans Day holiday.

=== Charts ===
Chart performance for "Travelin' Soldier"
Chart (2025–2026)	Peak position
Canada (Canadian Hot 100)	26
Global 200 (Billboard)	79
New Zealand Hot Singles (RMNZ)	5
Norway (IFPI Norge)	58
US Billboard Hot 100	12
US Country Airplay (Billboard)	40
US Hot Country Songs (Billboard)	2

=== Certifications ===
Certifications for "Travelin' Soldier"
Region	Certification	Certified units/sales
United States (RIAA)	Gold	500,000^{‡}
^{‡} Sales+streaming figures based on certification alone.

== See also ==
- List of anti-war songs
