= Gaslighter (song) =

2020 song by the Dixie Chicks

Single by Dixie Chicks

from the album Gaslighter
- Released: March 4, 2020
- Genre: Country
- Length: 3:23
- Label: Columbia
- Songwriters: Natalie Maines; Emily Robison; Martie Maguire; Jack Antonoff
- Producers: Jack Antonoff; Dixie Chicks

Dixie Chicks singles chronology
"The Neighbor" (2007)	"Gaslighter" (2020)	"Julianna Calm Down" (2020)

Music video
- "Gaslighter" on YouTube

"Gaslighter" is a song recorded by American country music group the Dixie Chicks from their eighth studio album of the same name. The song was written and produced by the group and Jack Antonoff. "Gaslighter" was the final release by the group before changing their name to "The Chicks" in June 2020.

== Composition ==
The title of the song refers to gaslighting. The song has been described as an "empowering", "fiery", and "scathing" anthem. The song uses a simple country base but adds layers to it, and combined with emotionally charged lyrics, produces a distinct and catchy tune.

== Critical reception ==
Pitchfork awarded "Gaslighter" their "Best New Track" distinction, with Sam Sodomsky writing that it "merges the open-road optimism of their early records with the sharper power-pop" of their previous album many years earlier, Taking the Long Way.

== Personnel ==
Dixie Chicks

- Natalie Maines – vocals
- Martie Maguire – vocals, fiddle
- Emily Strayer – vocals, banjo

Additional musicians

- Jack Antonoff – Mellotron, acoustic guitar, piano, percussion, keyboards, drums, 12-string acoustic guitar, 12-string electric guitar, producer
- Sean Hutchinson – percussion
- Michael Riddleberger – percussion
- Chad Smith – drums

== Music video ==
The song's music video was directed by Seanne Farmer, and has been described as "a throwback to old school political propaganda".

== Charts ==
=== Weekly charts ===
Weekly chart performance for "Gaslighter"
Chart (2020)	Peak position
Australia (Country Airplay)	7
Canada Hot 100 (Billboard)	69
Canada Country (Billboard)	31
New Zealand Hot Singles (RMNZ)	23
Scotland Singles (Official Charts)	38
UK Singles Downloads (Official Charts)	68
US Country Airplay (Billboard)	36
US Hot Country Songs (Billboard)	20
US Bubbling Under Hot 100 (Billboard)	7

=== Year-end charts ===
2020 year-end chart performance for "Gaslighter"
Chart (2020)	Position
US Hot Country Songs (Billboard)	99
