= Amelita (album) =

Studio album by Court Yard Hounds
- Released: July 16, 2013
- Genre: Country
- Length: 42:22
- Label: Columbia
- Producer: Jim Scott, Emily Robison and Martie Maguire

Court Yard Hounds chronology
Court Yard Hounds (2010)	Amelita (2013)

Singles from Amelita
- 1. "Sunshine" Released: June 7, 2013

Professional ratings
Aggregate scores
Source	Rating
Metacritic	71/100
Review scores
Source	Rating
AllMusic	4/5 stars

Amelita is the second studio album by country band Court Yard Hounds. It was released in July 2013 under Columbia Records.

== Track listing ==
All tracks are written by Martie Maguire, Emily Robison, and Martin Strayer, except where noted.

No.	Title	Length
1.	"Sunshine" (Maguire, Robison, Jonatha Brooke, Alex Dezen)	3:39
2.	"Amelita" (Maguire, Robison)	4:11
3.	"The World Smiles" (Maguire, Robison, Strayer, Greg Kurstin, Tyler Lyle)	3:24
4.	"Aimless Upward" (Martie Maguire, Robison, Lyle)	3:54
5.	"Guy Like You" (Maguire, Strayer)	3:43
6.	"Rock All Night" (Robison, Strayer)	3:44
7.	"Phoebe"	3:57
8.	"Divided"	3:25
9.	"Gets You Down" (Alex Dezen, Salim Nourallah)	3:56
10.	"Watch Your Step" (Maguire, Robison, Strayer, Kurstin)	3:34
11.	"The Road You Take"	4:55
Total length:		42:22

iTunes Bonus Edition
No.	Title	Length
12.	"Are You Man Enough?" (Maguire, Robison, Ryan Adams)	3:39

== Personnel ==
=== Court Yard Hounds ===
- Martie Maguire – fiddle, mandolin, viola, lead vocals, background vocals
- Emily Robison – banjo, dobro, acoustic guitar, electric guitar, lead vocals, background vocals

=== Additional musicians ===
- Bukka Allen – Hammond organ, Wurlitzer
- Daniel Clarke – Farfisa organ, Hammond organ, piano
- Fred Eltringham – drums, percussion
- Audley Freed – 12-string guitar, acoustic guitar, electric guitar
- John Ginty – Hammond organ, percussion, piano
- Joshua Grange – pedal steel guitar
- Billy Harvey – electric guitar
- Greg Kurstin – clavinet, drum programming, drums, mellotron, percussion sampling
- George Reiff – bass guitar
- Martin Strayer – acoustic guitar, electric guitar, piano
