= Gaslighter (album) =

2020 studio album by the Chicks

Studio album by The Chicks
- Released: July 17, 2020
- Recorded: 2018–2020
- Studio: Conway (Hollywood); Laurel House and Electric Lady (New York); Westlake (Los Angeles); Henson (Hollywood)
- Genre: Country; country pop
- Length: 46:54
- Label: Columbia
- Producer: Jack Antonoff; The Chicks; Teddy Geiger

The Chicks chronology
DCX MMXVI Live (2016)	Gaslighter (2020)

Singles from Gaslighter
- 1. "Gaslighter" Released: March 4, 2020; 2. "Julianna Calm Down" Released: May 1, 2020; 3. "March March" Released: June 25, 2020; 4. "Sleep at Night" Released: July 17, 2020

Gaslighter is the eighth studio album by American country band the Chicks. It was released on July 17, 2020, by Columbia Records. Produced by Jack Antonoff and the Chicks, it is the group's first album in 14 years, and first to be released under their new name (though earlier physical pressings of the album still carry the "Dixie Chicks" name). The album was preceded by the release of three singles: "Gaslighter", "Julianna Calm Down", and "March March". The album received critical acclaim.

== Background ==
The Chicks began to hint at a new album in June 2018 when Natalie Maines posted several photos from the recording studio on Instagram. While Maines and her bandmates Emily Strayer and Martie Maguire continued to drop small hints that new music might be in the works, they did not confirm that an album was planned until a year later when Maines posted a video clip to Instagram in which the trio took turns saying, "Dixie Chicks. Album. Coming." This was followed by producer Jack Antonoff saying, "Someday."

In August 2019, in the midst of their divorce, Maines' ex-husband Adrian Pasdar asked the court to give him access to all of Maines' unreleased music over concerns it might violate a confidentiality clause in their prenuptial agreement, although he had previously argued in divorce proceedings that the couple's prenuptial agreement was invalid, claiming that Maines should owe him financial support. Pasdar stated that he wanted to know if any of the unreleased material might contain lyrics that pertain to their breakup. Maines' legal team filed a response to Pasdar's new motion, saying that if he succeeds in overturning the validity of the agreement, it also invalidates the confidentiality clause. Their divorce was finalized in December after Maines and Pasdar settled out of court.

In September 2019, Maines revealed during her Spiritualgasm podcast that the album would be titled Gaslighter. She went on to say that the album was originally planned to be something simple, like an album of covers, to fulfill their contract with Sony, but after her divorce from Pasdar, she had been inspired to start writing songs again. She said, "When I started getting a divorce, I had a lot to say, so that kind of sparked me being ready [to make new music]. Songwriting is really hard for me, and I think, for many years, I didn't want to analyze my life or my relationship. I was just in it and dedicated and devoted...I just was not ready to open up like that." During the same podcast, host Sterling Jones mentions a song titled "Go It Alone," which Maines revealed is actually titled "My Best Friend's Weddings". The title of the album refers to gaslighting.

On June 25, 2020, the band changed their name to the Chicks, dropping "Dixie", which referenced any of the American South, the Antebellum South, or the American Mason–Dixon line. The name change followed criticism that the word had connotations of American slavery.

== Release and promotion ==
The album was announced on March 4, 2020, with a scheduled release date of May 1. On April 21, the release was postponed due to the COVID-19 pandemic. On June 11, the album's release was rescheduled for July 17.

=== Singles ===
The lead single, "Gaslighter", was released to critical acclaim on March 4, 2020, along with the album's pre-order. The music video was directed by Seanne Farmer and was released the same day. The song deals with lead singer Natalie Maines' bitter divorce from ex-husband Adrian Pasdar. It peaked at number 20 on the Billboard Hot Country Songs chart and number 36 on the Country Airplay chart. The song also peaked at number 31 on the Canada Country chart.

"Julianna Calm Down" was released as the album's first promotional single on May 1. The song peaked at number 15 on the Billboard Country Digital Song Sales chart. The album's third single, "March March", was released on June 25, along with its accompanying music video. The song peaked at number 32 on the Billboard Hot Country Songs chart. "Sleep at Night" was released as the album's fourth single on July 17, along with its accompanying music video.

== Critical reception ==
Professional ratings
Aggregate scores
Source	Rating
AnyDecentMusic?	7.8/10
Metacritic	82/100
Review scores
Source	Rating
AllMusic	4/5 stars
And It Don't Stop	A−
The Daily Telegraph	5/5 stars
Entertainment Weekly	A
Exclaim!	8/10
The Guardian	4/5 stars
The Independent	4/5 stars
Paste	8.6/10
Pitchfork	7.0/10
Rolling Stone	3/5 stars

Gaslighter was met with widespread critical acclaim. At Metacritic, which assigns a normalized rating out of 100 to reviews from mainstream publications, the album received a weighted average score of 82 based on 21 reviews. Album of the Year, which also assigns a normalized rating out of 100 to reviews from mainstream publications, gave the album a weighted average score of 82 based on 24 reviews. At AnyDecentMusic?, which assigns a normalized rating out of 10 to reviews from mainstream publications, the album received a weighted average score of 7.8 based on 19 reviews.

In a review for The Daily Telegraph, Neil McCormick called it "stunning", praising Antonoff's "slick, tasteful production" and "perfectly balanced vocal arrangements". Writing for Entertainment Weekly, Maura Johnston said that "by blending early-21st-century pop savvy with the storytelling that made country music so crucial to the American canon, Gaslighter is all fire and nerve." Chris Willman, in a review for Variety, praised the album's songwriting, saying that "each new incendiary lyrical moment seems to top the last, before grievance gives way to beautiful grief." Laura Dzubay, in Consequence of Sound, praised the group's "management of tone throughout" as "masterful and consistent". She felt that the album was "anchored to place by restrained instrumentation and artful, deliberate counterpoints between highs and lows." Writing for American Songwriter, Lynne Margolis said that the album is "so full of emotion, it takes a while to absorb it all". She went on to say that the album's "not perfect, and it's not meant to be. But the juxtaposition of slickness and rawness somehow works."

Ellen Johnson reviewed the album for Paste, calling it "the best country album of 2020". She felt the album "forces empathy onto the listener while reminding us we don't have to be superheroes to make a difference." Writing for AllMusic, Stephen Thomas Erlewine praised the album's arrangements as "subtle and sly" and "accentuating the emotions underpinning the songs". The Guardian called it "pertinent on its own terms" instead of sounding like "three middle-aged musicians straining to recapture their relevance." Annabel Nugent, in a review for The Independent, said that while the album "is not a reinvention for the trio by any means", it is "still political" and "still resilient". Mikael Wood reviewed the album for the Los Angeles Times, calling it the group's "most personal effort yet".

In his "Consumer Guide" column, Robert Christgau said that while the songs have a "pro forma" effect attributable to Antonoff, "Maines has never written with more righteous anger and sisterly concern—more humanity." More critical was Claire Shaffer of Rolling Stone, felt that the tracks on the album "fall into easy, radio-friendly categories: empowerment anthem, cheeky ukulele kiss-off, [and] minimalist protest song." She noted that the "arrangements dissolve most of the group's lingering connections to their street-corner bluegrass origins."

=== Accolades ===
Accolades for Gaslighter
Publication	Accolade	Rank
Consequence of Sound	Top 50 Albums of 2020	38
Entertainment Weekly	Top 15 Albums of 2020	6
Time	Top 10 Albums of 2020	4

== Commercial performance ==
On the US Billboard 200, Gaslighter debuted at number 3 with 84,000 album-equivalent units, becoming the band's fifth top 5 album and first in the streaming era. Including 71,000 album sales, it was the best-selling album in its debut week.

== Track listing ==
Gaslighter track listing
No.	Title	Writer(s)	Producer(s)	Length
1.	"Gaslighter"	Martie Maguire; Natalie Maines; Emily Strayer; Jack Antonoff; Carol Oordt	Jack Antonoff; the Chicks	3:23
2.	"Sleep at Night"	Maguire; Maines; Strayer; Teddy Geiger; Justin Tranter	Teddy Geiger; Antonoff; the Chicks	3:12
3.	"Texas Man"	Maguire; Maines; Strayer; Antonoff; Julia Michaels; Tranter	Antonoff; the Chicks	3:44
4.	"Everybody Loves You"	Charlotte Lawrence; Joseph Spargur; Hayley Gene Penner	Antonoff; the Chicks	3:38
5.	"For Her"	Maguire; Maines; Strayer; Ariel Rechtshaid; Sarah Aarons	Antonoff; the Chicks	5:26
6.	"March March"	Maguire; Maines; Strayer; Antonoff; Ross Golan; Ian Kirkpatrick; Daniel Dodd Wilson	Antonoff; the Chicks	3:53
7.	"My Best Friend's Weddings"	Maguire; Maines; Strayer; Antonoff; Tranter	Antonoff; the Chicks	4:18
8.	"Tights on My Boat"	Maguire; Maines; Strayer; Antonoff; Michaels	Antonoff; the Chicks	3:02
9.	"Julianna Calm Down"	Maines; Antonoff; Michaels	Antonoff; the Chicks	4:46
10.	"Young Man"	Maguire; Maines; Strayer; Antonoff; Annie Clark; Tranter	Antonoff; the Chicks	4:09
11.	"Hope It's Something Good"	Maguire; Maines; Strayer; Antonoff	Antonoff; the Chicks	4:05
12.	"Set Me Free"	Maguire; Maines; Strayer; Antonoff; Ben Abraham	Antonoff; the Chicks	3:18
Total length:				46:54

== Personnel ==
Adapted from the album liner notes.

The Chicks

- Natalie Maines – vocals, Omnichord (track 4), acoustic guitar (track 4), percussion/leg slaps (track 6), ukulele (track 8)
- Martie Maguire – vocals, fiddle, viola (tracks 2, 4–5, 7, 9, 11–12)
- Emily Strayer – vocals, banjo (all tracks except 8 and 10), acoustic guitar (tracks 4, 6, 9–10), asher (track 6), resonator guitar (track 10), ukulele (track 12)

Additional musicians

- Jack Antonoff – Mellotron (tracks 1–2, 4, 7, 9–12), acoustic guitar (tracks 1, 3–4, 8–12), piano (tracks 1–7, 9, 11), percussion (tracks 1–3, 6–9), keyboards (tracks 1, 6), drums (tracks 1–3, 5–9, 11), 12-string acoustic guitar (tracks 1, 9), 12-string electric guitar (track 1), programming (tracks 2, 5–8), bass (tracks 2, 4–5, 7, 10), Moog (tracks 2, 4), modular (track 2), background vocals (track 2), electric bass (track 3), acoustic bass (tracks 3, 8), electric guitar (tracks 3, 8), guitar (track 5), Wurlitzer (track 5), Juno (tracks 5, 7–8, 11), B3 (track 9), vibes (track 12)
- Eric Byers – cello (tracks 2, 5, 11–12)
- Annie Clark – electric guitar (track 3)
- Teddy Geiger – programming (track 2), percussion (track 2), guitar (track 2), keys (track 2)
- Mikey Freedom Hart – Wurlitzer (track 5)
- Sean Hutchinson – percussion (track 1)
- Lloyd Maines – pedal steel (tracks 2, 6, 9, 11–12)
- Justin Meldal-Johnson – bass (track 8)
- Beckett Pasdar – drums (track 2)
- Michael Riddleberger – percussion (track 1)
- Chad Smith – drums (tracks 1–2, 5–7, 9, 11), percussion/leg slaps (track 6)
- Evan Smith – organ (track 8)
- Erick Walls – acoustic guitar (track 8)
- Justin Weaver – guitar (track 8)

Production

- Jack Antonoff – producer, recording, mixing (tracks 8, 10, 12)
- The Chicks – producer
- Greg Eliason – recording assistant (track 4)
- Ben Fletcher – mixing engineer (tracks 2, 7, 9)
- Teddy Geiger – producer (track 2)
- Jeff Gunnell – recording (track 2)
- Serban Ghenea – mixing (tracks 1–9, 11)
- John Hanes – mixing engineer (tracks 1–9, 11)
- John Rooney – recording assistant (tracks 3, 5, 7, 9)
- Jon Sher – recording assistant
- Laura Sisk – recording, mixing (tracks 8, 10, 12)
- Chris Gehringer – mastering
- Will Quinnell – mastering

Other personnel

- Savannah Baker – wardrobe styling
- Michael Bierut – album design
- The Chicks – creative direction, album design
- Britt Cobb – album design
- Hesh Hipp – First assailant camera
- Breidge Martin – cover photo
  - Cover photo features Corrigan-White School of Irish Dance Competition Winners (from left to right): Josie Bogle, Emma Martin, and Caoimhe O'Shea
- Monotone/LBI Entertainment – management
- Delta Murphy – album design
- Pentagram – album design
- Philippa Price – additional creative direction, additional photography

== Charts ==
=== Weekly charts ===
Weekly chart performance for Gaslighter
Chart (2020)	Peak position
Australian Albums (ARIA)	2
Australian Country Albums (ARIA)	1
Austrian Albums (Ö3 Austria)	21
Belgian Albums (Ultratop Flanders)	173
Canadian Albums (Billboard)	3
Dutch Albums (Album Top 100)	22
German Albums (Offizielle Top 100)	14
Irish Albums (Official Charts)	20
New Zealand Albums (RMNZ)	2
Scottish Albums (Official Charts)	3
Swedish Albums (Sverigetopplistan)	14
Swiss Albums (Schweizer Hitparade)	5
UK Albums (Official Charts)	5
UK Country Albums (Official Charts)	1
US Billboard 200	3
US Top Country Albums (Billboard)	1

=== Year-end charts ===
2020 year-end chart performance for Gaslighter
Chart (2020)	Position
Australian Top Country Albums (ARIA)	6
US Top Country Albums (Billboard)	46
