= Mother (Natalie Maines album) =

Studio album by Natalie Maines
- Released: May 7, 2013
- Recorded: June–December 2012
- Genre: Pop rock
- Label: Columbia
- Producers: Ben Harper and Natalie Maines

Mother is the debut solo studio album by American singer Natalie Maines. It was released on May 7, 2013.

== Background ==
Mother is Natalie Maines' first album since the Dixie Chicks' Grammy-sweeping Taking the Long Way in 2006, and comes ten years after the Dixie Chicks were boycotted and banned by country radio for Maines' criticism of U.S. President George W. Bush in 2003. In her seven-year absence from the recording industry, Maines expressed a lack of interest in modern country music.

In June 2012, Maines announced the project on a Howard 100 News broadcast, stating, "I'm making an album, I think." On October 6, she confirmed on Twitter that it would be a rock album, and her first without the Dixie Chicks. Recording completed on December 19. It will include both original music and covers.

The title track, a cover of Pink Floyd's "Mother", debuted on the West of Memphis soundtrack on January 15, 2013. On February 27, Maines and the album's producer Ben Harper performed songs from the album in a private concert at The Troubadour.

The vinyl LP version of the record was pressed by United Record Pressing in Nashville, Tennessee.

The cover of Jeff Buckley's Lover, You Should've Come Over has been described as "the sort of careening soul-metal epic that few vocalists even dare to attempt." by NPR's Anne Powers.

== Critical reception ==
Professional ratings
Review scores
| Source | Rating |
|---|---|
| AllMusic | 3/5 stars |
| Daily News | 5/5 stars |
| Entertainment Weekly | B+ |
| Paste | 7.9/10 |
| Rolling Stone | 3/5 stars |
| The Salt Lake Tribune | C+ |
| Slant Magazine | 3/5 stars |
| Tampa Bay Times | B+ |
| USA Today | 3.5/4 stars |

Mother has received mostly positive reviews from music critics. At Metacritic, which assigns a weighted average score out of 100 to reviews and ratings from mainstream critics, the album received a metascore of 70, based on 10 reviews. At Daily News, Jim Farber called it "a flat-out masterpiece, an ideal match of singer and songs that moves Maines from being a skilled and decorative singer into one of the most emotive vocalists of our time." Kyle Anderson of Entertainment Weekly evoked that the release is "full of muscular blues riffs and slide guitar, with nary a banjo breakdown — Natalie Maines is still going to bat for underdogs." At Paste, Philip Cosores proclaimed that "Mother is a good, at times even great, start to a solo recording identity for Natalie Maines, but lacks only in the listener’s greatest desire, to learn more about Maines." Sean Daly of Tampa Bay Times wrote that "if Mother isn't exactly a saucy return to her robust Dixie days, neither is she withdrawing into obtuse, difficult songs that muted her elastic voice like a shroud." At USA Today, Edna Gunderson called the album "a collection of buffed roots-rock that veers sharply from the cheery twang that sent Maines, Martie Maguire and Emily Robison into the sales stratosphere." Maines' cover of "Mother" was praised by critic Ann Powers of NPR Music for its "unadorned singing" and "tender" interpretation of a vulnerable mother, in contrast to Roger Waters' "prissy and cruel" mother.

However, AllMusic's Tom Jurek found that "the set's overly polished production and the scattershot curation of the material makes it feel like more like just a haphazard collection of songs than a cohesive album." At Rolling Stone, Jody Rosen criticized the album because "too often, the music feels a bit limp, and the buttery harmony backups of her fellow Dixie Chicks are sorely missed." David Burger of The Salt Lake Tribune stated that for fans "looking for the fun country shown by the Dixie Chicks will find primarily rock-influenced production that is serious to the point of dry earnestness." Slant Magazine's Jonathan Keefe wrote that "however welcome it may be to hear her voice again, it's ultimately her decision to play things so safe that keeps Mother from being a wholly satisfying return."

== Track listing ==
| No. | Title | Writer(s) | Length |
|---|---|---|---|
| 1. | "Without You" | Eddie Vedder | 3:51 |
| 2. | "Mother" | Roger Waters | 5:52 |
| 3. | "Free Life" | Dan Wilson | 5:02 |
| 4. | "Silver Bell" | Patty Griffin, Adam Steinberg | 3:00 |
| 5. | "Lover, You Should've Come Over" | Jeff Buckley | 7:01 |
| 6. | "Vein in Vain" | Ben Harper, Jesse Ingalls, Natalie Maines, Jason Mozersky | 4:44 |
| 7. | "Trained" | Harper | 2:40 |
| 8. | "Come Cryin' to Me" | Gary Louris, Martie Maguire, Maines, Emily Robison | 4:33 |
| 9. | "I'd Run Away" | Mark Olson, Louris | 3:31 |
| 10. | "Take It on Faith" | Harper, Ingalls, Maines, Mozersky | 5:46 |

== Personnel ==
- Kyle Crusham – electric guitar, keyboards
- Ben Harper – acoustic guitar, electric guitar, percussion, slide guitar, background vocals
- Jaya Harper – background vocals
- Jesse Ingalls – bass guitar, keyboards
- Tom Loo – cello
- Natalie Maines – lead vocals, background vocals
- Jason Mozersky – acoustic guitar, electric guitar
- Joel Pargman – violin
- Jordan Richardson – drums, background vocals
- Oleg Schramm – organ
- Aaron Sterling – drums

== Charts ==
| Chart (2013) | Peak position |
|---|---|
| Australian Albums (ARIA) | 50 |
| US Billboard 200 | 17 |
| US Top Rock Albums (Billboard) | 4 |
