= Court Yard Hounds (album) =

Studio album by Court Yard Hounds
- Released: May 4, 2010
- Recorded: 2009
- Genre: Country rock
- Label: Columbia
- Producers: Emily Robison; Martie Maguire; Jim Scott

Court Yard Hounds chronology
Court Yard Hounds (2010)	Amelita (2013)

Singles from Court Yard Hounds
- 1. "The Coast" Released: March 30, 2010; 2. "It Didn't Make a Sound" Released: May 2010; 3. "See You in the Spring" Released: July 2010

Court Yard Hounds is the debut studio album by American country duo the Court Yard Hounds, founded as a side project of the Dixie Chicks by sisters Emily Robison and Martie Maguire. The album was released on May 4, 2010, via Columbia Records. It was mainly recorded in Maguire's home studio in Austin, and co-produced with Jim Scott (who was also the Grammy-winning sound mixer/engineer on the Dixie Chicks' latest album Taking the Long Way and Playlist: The Best of the Dixie Chicks).

== Promotion ==
On February 10, 2010, the album became available for pre-order. Additionally, four tracks from the album – "Delight (Something New Under the Sun)," "The Coast," "Fear of Wasted Time," and "Ain't No Son" – were available for download to those who pre-ordered the album. The duo made their first public appearance on March 18, 2010, at the Americana Music Association's SXSW showcase, with a tour to follow.

The group's debut single, "The Coast," was released on March 30, 2010, and served as the lead-off single for the album.

The group made their first appearance at SXSW in Austin, TX in 2010. Their first tour was as part of Lilith Fair on July 15, 2010. They are scheduled for around 10 dates on the tour.

Professional ratings
Review scores
Source	Rating
Engine 145	3.5/5 stars
Allmusic	3/5 stars
Entertainment Weekly	B
Slant Magazine	3.5/5 stars
Paste	7.6/10
Rolling Stone	3/5 stars
Robert Christgau	(choice cut)

== Track listing ==
This Track List was confirmed by their Official Website on February 10, 2010.

Martie Maguire sings lead on her composition, "Gracefully". Lead vocals on all other songs are performed by Emily Robison.

No.	Title	Writer(s)	Length
1.	"Skyline"	Emily Robison; Martin Strayer	4:20
2.	"The Coast"	Emily Robison	3:04
3.	"Delight (Something New Under the Sun)"	Emily Robison; Martin Strayer	4:34
4.	"See You in the Spring" (featuring Jakob Dylan)	Emily Robison; Martin Strayer	4:50
5.	"Ain't No Son"	Emily Robison; Martie Maguire	4:39
6.	"Fairytale"	Emily Robison; Martin Strayer	4:05
7.	"I Miss You"	Emily Robison	3:49
8.	"Gracefully"	Martie Maguire	4:28
9.	"April's Love"	Emily Robison; Martin Strayer	3:23
10.	"Then Again"	Emily Robison	3:20
11.	"It Didn't Make a Sound"	Emily Robison; Martin Strayer	3:48
12.	"Fear of Wasted Time"	Emily Robison; Martin Strayer	4:07
Total length:			48:27

Deluxe Edition / iTunes
No.	Title	Writer(s)	Length
13.	"Well Behaved"	Emily Robison	4:35
14.	"Straw Cage"	Emily Robison; Martin Strayer	3:24
Total length:			56:26

== Personnel ==
- Adapted from allmusic

=== Court Yard Hounds ===
- Martie Maguire: Fiddle, Mandolin, Viola, Lead Vocals, Background Vocals
- Emily Robison: Acoustic Guitar, electric guitar, Resonator Guitar, Dobro, Banjo, Pump Organ, Lead Vocals, Background Vocals

=== Additional personnel ===
- Jakob Dylan: Duet Vocals on "See You in the Spring"
- Mike Finnigan: Piano
- Audley Freed: Acoustic guitar, Electric guitar, Twelve-string guitar, Slide guitar
- Martin Strayer: Acoustic guitar, Electric guitar, Piano
- Greg Leisz: Steel guitar
- Lloyd Maines: Steel Guitar, Dobro, Mandolin
- Jerry Holmes: Autoharp
- Glen Fukunaga: Acoustic bass
- George Reiff: Bass guitar
- Don Heffington: Drums, Percussion
- Pat Manske: Percussion
- Tom Hale: French horn
- Brian Standefer: Cello

== Production ==
Adapted from allmusic:

- Produced By Emily Robison, Martie Maguire & Jim Scott
- Recording Engineers: Les Banks, Pat Manske, Jim Scott & Kevin Szymanski
- Additional Recording Engineered By Kevin Dean & Adam Odor
- Mixed By Jim Scott
- Mastered By Richard Dodd

== Chart performance ==
Court Yard Hounds debuted at #7 on the U.S. Billboard 200, with 61,119 copies sold in its first week. The album has sold approximately 500,000 copies in the United States.

Chart (2010)	Peak position
Australian Albums Chart	42
Canadian Albums Chart	6
New Zealand Albums Chart	30
Swedish Albums Chart	58
UK Albums Chart	79
US Billboard 200	7
US Billboard Top Rock Albums	3
