= Greenhill School (Addison, Texas) =

Day school in the United States

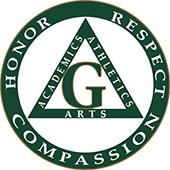

Location
- 4141 Spring Valley Road; Addison, Texas; United States; 32.942335°N 96.844059°W

Information
- Type: Independent, Coeducational, and College Preparatory School
- Established: 1950
- Grades: PreK-12
- Enrollment: 1,436
- Campus: Suburban
- Colors: Green & Gold
- Mascot: Hornet (Hugo the Hornet)
- Accreditation: Independent Schools Association of the Southwest (ISAS)
- Website: www.greenhill.org

Greenhill School is a co-educational day school in Addison, Texas, United States. The school was founded in 1950 by Bernard Fulton. The 78-acre (320,000 m^{2}) campus is located 12 miles (19 km) north of Downtown Dallas. It enrolls about 1,400 students from throughout the Dallas Metroplex. The school is the first co-educational, non-denominational pre-kindergarten through grade 12 school in Dallas and is a member of both the Independent Schools Association of the Southwest (ISAS) and the Southwest Preparatory Conference (SPC).

== History ==
Greenhill School was founded in 1950 as a co-educational option among the independent schools in Dallas. From 1950 to 1976, Bernard Fulton served as the founding headmaster. At the time, he introduced the concepts of independent co-education, the primer program, and open-space education while the school grew from 62 students to 1,002. After he retired from Greenhill School, he became the headmaster of Lakehill Preparatory School, and later, Fulton Academy in Rockwall, Texas, was named after him as well. On October 20, 1990, Governor Bill Clements declared Bernard Fulton Day “for his dedication to the education of young people in Dallas, in Texas, and in the nation."

From 1955 to 1959, State Representative Fred Agnich of Dallas was chairman of the board of the Greenhill School and was instrumental in the early development of the institution.

The original Upper School building was part of a pre-existing farmhouse. It also housed Greenhill's library, cafeteria, and administrative offices. In 1963, a fire decimated the Upper School building; it was rebuilt in 1974. The building suffered another fire in 1987 but reopened the following year.

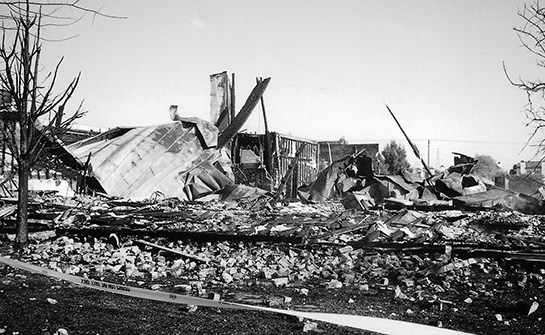
The aftermath of the fire that destroyed the old Upper School in March 1987.

== Academics ==
The school is divided into four sections: Preschool, Lower School, Middle School, and the Upper School, which houses about 470 students in grades 9-12.

Students are required to complete 48 hours of community service before graduating.

Additionally, Greenhill is home to several extracurricular clubs, some of which have received awards for their performance. Its Band, Orchestra, Debate, Video Production, and Quiz Bowl programs have all received state and national awards.

== Traditions ==
=== The Water Tower ===
Each year, the incoming seniors paint the Water Tower in the parking lot with graffiti. They spray their names on it with an overriding theme and picture to depict their grade.

=== First Day of School ===
On the first day of school, students arrive on campus with a painted water tower. The senior class comes to school with females dressed in white and males dressed in black. The whole school also attends an assembly in the Phillips Gymnasium to ring in the new year.

=== Founder's Day ===
Founder's Day is the annual September 11 celebration of Greenhill's establishment on September 11, 1950. The whole school meets in the Phillips Gymnasium for an assembly to commemorate two teachers and honor five faculty members. The Student Council President (a senior) lights the Founder's Day Candle with the current longest working faculty member. During the assembly, the Service-Learning and Community Service Program announces the Estelle Dickens service project for the year. Legacy Heart of the Hill groups are named during this assembly. The Heart of the Hill program is designed to bring groups of students from each division—Lower, Middle and Upper—together to help instill a sense of community across the campus.

=== Senior Breakfast ===
The Alumni Association holds the annual senior breakfast in the fall for the graduating seniors. During this time, the graduating seniors meet with alumni and are given their senior sweatshirts.

== Athletics ==
Greenhill is a member of the Southwest Preparatory Conference which includes private schools from Texas and Oklahoma. Students start playing athletics for the school when they enter the 7th grade and are able to participate in Basketball, Baseball, Cheerleading, Cross Country, Diving, Golf, Field Hockey, Football, Lacrosse, Soccer, Softball, Swimming, Tennis, Track and Field, and Volleyball.

== Notable alumni ==
- Ed Barnhart, archaeologist and explorer specializing in ancient civilizations of the Americas
- David Berman, musician, Silver Jews
- Jordan Carlos, comedian/actor
- Molly Erdman, actress, author and improvisational comedian
- Eugenio Garza Pérez, Olympic equestrian
- Lesli Linka Glatter, Emmy-nominated film and television director, president of the Directors Guild of America
- Mila Hermanovski, fashion designer, Project Runway Season 7 finalist and Project Runway: All Stars contestant
- Ilyse Hogue, progressive activist, former NARAL Pro-Choice America president
- Rashad Hussain, United States Ambassador-at-Large for International Religious Freedom; attorney and professor
- Jackie 'Butch' Jenkins, actor
- Eric Johnson, 60th Mayor of Dallas and former member of the Texas House of Representatives
- Ronald Judkins, winner of the Academy Award for Best Sound for Jurassic Park and Saving Private Ryan
- Priya Krishna, food critic and journalist
- R. F. Kuang, novelist and fantasy author of The Poppy War
- Anthony Lovett, author, actor, director
- Martie Maguire, musician, The Chicks, Court Yard Hounds
- Cooper Raiff, filmmaker and actor; winner of the Audience Award at the Sundance Film Festival for Cha Cha Real Smooth
- Emily Robison, musician, The Chicks, Court Yard Hounds
- Lela Rose, fashion designer
- Scott Rothkopf, director of the Whitney Museum of American Art
- Iliza Shlesinger, comedian, actress and television host
- Grant Solomon, former professional tennis player
- Rob Stone, actor and documentary producer/director
- Karen Rupert Toliver, executive vice president of Sony Pictures, winner of the Academy Award for Best Animated Short Film for Hair Love
- Beth Van Duyne, U.S. Representative for Texas' 24th Congressional District and former mayor of Irving, Texas
