= Protesting the Dixie Chicks =

2006 film

- Directed by: Christopher Fleeger
- Starring: Dixie Chicks
- Release date: 2006
- Running time: 59 minutes
- Country: United States

Protesting the Dixie Chicks is a documentary by American filmmaker Christopher Fleeger, independently released on DVD in 2006. The film captures the storm of controversy ignited by the remarks of Natalie Maines, lead singer of the Texas pop-country trio the Dixie Chicks. On March 10, 2003, Natalie Maines, at a concert in London, stated that her group was "ashamed" to be from the same state as President George W. Bush. In the man-on-the-street style of Heavy Metal Parking Lot, anonymous fans and protesters are interviewed outside the arenas of the Dixie Chicks 2003 USA tour, while the context of the drama is reenacted with toys and action figures of Natalie Maines, Toby Keith, General John Abizaid, Senator Richard Lugar, Senator John McCain and President George W. Bush.
