= Anthony Lovett =

Anthony Lovett, better known as Tony Lovett, (May 13, 1961 – January 26, 2014), was the co-author with Matt Maranian of the regional cult classic, L.A. Bizarro, a best-selling underground guidebook to Los Angeles. The first edition of the book, which went to #1 on the L.A. Times Non-Fiction Bestseller list in 1997, remained on the chart for 5 months, and was in print for over ten years. L.A. Bizarro went through more than twenty printings before finally being retired by St. Martin's Press in 2007.

The authors were profiled in the Weekend Calendar section of the L.A. Times in August 2007 to commemorate the tenth anniversary of the book. Ironically, the first edition of L.A. Bizarro was out of print by then, but the cover story by Jessica Gelt generated renewed interest in an update/sequel as well as a website that is still a work in progress.

The all-new updated 2009 version of L.A. Bizarro by Chronicle Books was published in September 2009. Like the first book, it remained on the L.A. Times bestseller list for over six months, and garnered praise as well as a new generation of followers. The new book and its authors were written-up again in an L.A. Times feature article as well as in the L.A. Times blog.

== Background ==
Lovett was born in Maryland, but grew up in Dallas, Texas, where he graduated from Greenhill School in 1979. He was accepted into the USC School of Cinema-Television as a freshman, where he founded the loosely-knit anti-establishment art group called "Film Fascists." Influenced by Russ Meyer, David Lynch, John Waters, Fellini, Kurosawa, and Hitchcock, Lovett's own cinematic style fluctuated between surreal, sophomoric, and salacious. Lovett went on to join the Screen Actors Guild, appearing in Z-grade movies and television commercials. He also appeared onstage as an improv performer with April Winchell and Paul Rugg. With Ken Segall, they created their own short-lived comedy troupe, The Mood Swingers. A musician, photographer, and painter, Lovett played in a number of L.A. bands and also exhibited his paintings and photographs in the 1980s.

Lovett began his career as a freelance journalist and humorist in 1983, and went on to write feature articles for numerous national publications, including "I Am Curious Donkey" for Chic, and the crystal meth opus, "Wired in California," for the "Drugs in America" special issue of Rolling Stone. Lovett also contributed to Playboy and L.A. Weekly, among others. He has worked as a designer and copywriter for the entertainment industry, creating numerous campaigns for the big and small screens, and was developing a reality-based television show with Maranian and Star Price, who also created the popular Showtime series "Penn & Teller: Bullshit!"

Lovett died in his sleep on January 26, 2014, in the Los Angeles area. He was 52 years old.
