= Court Yard Hounds =

American country and folk music duo

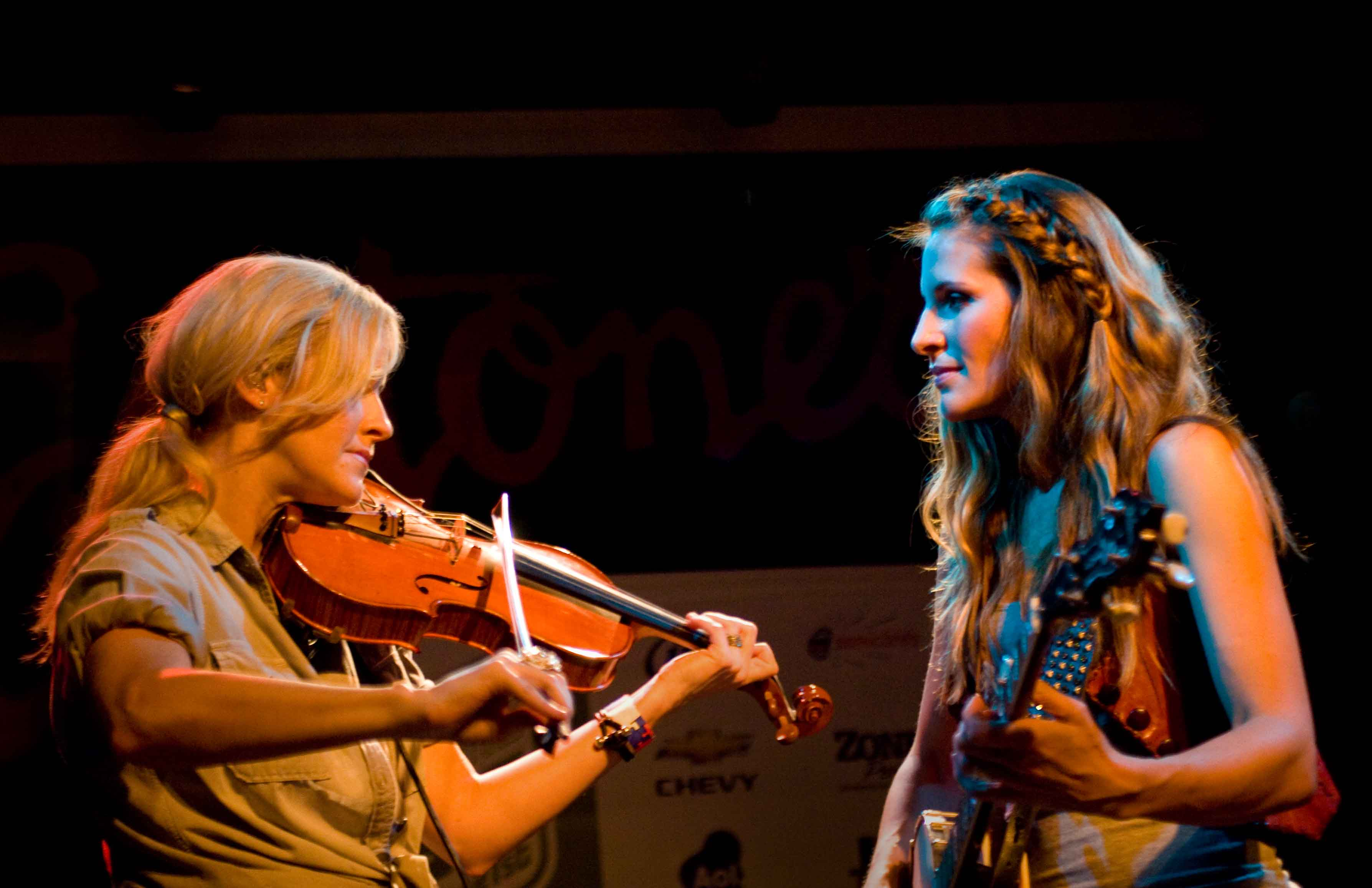
- Maguire, left, and Robison, right, performing at Antone's, SXSW, Austin, Texas, March 17, 2010

Background information
- Origin: San Antonio, Texas, U.S.
- Genres: Americana; country; folk
- Years active: 2009—2013
- Label: Columbia
- Spinoff of: The Chicks
- Past members: Martie Maguire; Emily Robison
- Website: courtyardhounds.com

Court Yard Hounds were an American country music and folk duo, founded by sisters Martie Maguire and Emily Strayer. They, along with Natalie Maines, make up The Chicks, formerly the Dixie Chicks. The sisters decided to record a side project under a different name. Court Yard Hounds, featuring Strayer for the first time as lead vocalist, released a debut album for Columbia Records, the same label for which the Dixie Chicks has recorded, on May 4, 2010. The album debuted at No. 7 on the Billboard 200 chart, initially selling 61,000 copies. It has sold approximately 825,000 copies in the United States.

== Career ==
=== Dixie Chicks ===
Emily and Martie Erwin, now Emily Strayer and Martie Maguire, founded the Dixie Chicks in 1989 with Robin Lynn Macy (lead vocals) and Laura Lynch. They released two independent albums before Macy left, and their third album was released with Lynch on lead vocals. In 1995, Lynch left and was replaced by Natalie Maines. The group was then signed to Monument Records and released two hit albums, before departing from Monument in 2000 and founding their own label, Open Wide Records, in association with Columbia Records. They then released their third album Home to critical acclaim. During a London concert ten days before the 2003 invasion of Iraq, lead vocalist Maines stated, " Just so you know, we're on the good side with y'all, we don't want this war, this violence, and we're ashamed that the President of the United States is from Texas" (the trio's home state). The statement offended their core fan base who thought it rude and unpatriotic, and the ensuing controversy cost the group half of their concert audience attendance in the United States and led to accusations of the three women being un-American, as well as hate mail, death threats, and the public destruction of their albums in protest. The group followed a small hiatus with a live album and a documentary highlighting the maelstrom created by Maines' comment entitled Dixie Chicks: Shut Up and Sing. The Dixie Chicks released Taking the Long Way in 2006 which has since sold over 3 million copies and ultimately won five Grammy Awards. The Dixie Chicks were on hiatus from 2008 until in 2016 they reformed for a world tour.

=== Formation of Court Yard Hounds ===
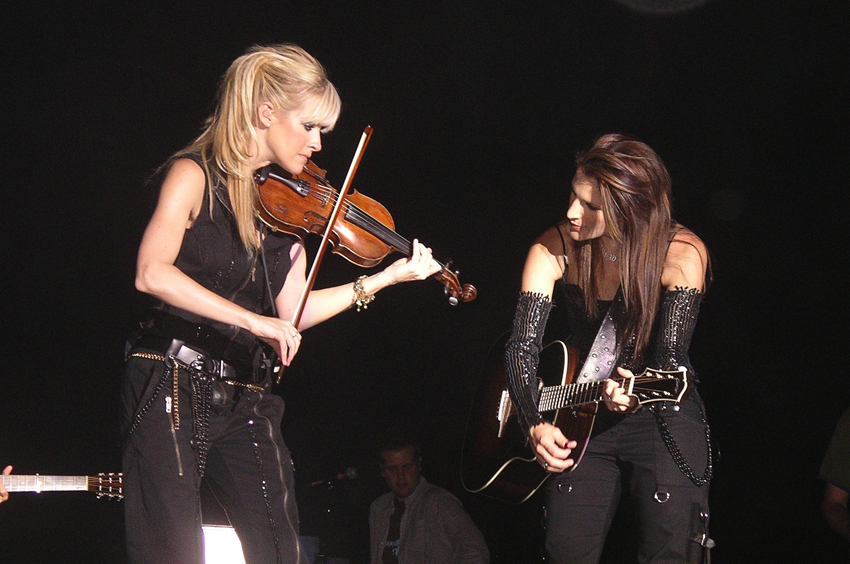
L to R:Maguire and Strayer, playing in concert as the Dixie Chicks in 2003

Court Yard Hounds was formed in 2009 when Maguire and Robison wanted to return to the studio however Maines was still reluctant to do so.

The duo's project was announced in January 2010 and the album features Emily on lead vocals. Robison said that the album is "very personal" and she would also be joined by singer-songwriter Jakob Dylan on a track called "See You in the Spring". The band signed to Columbia Records and released their self-titled debut album on May 4, 2010. Their first public appearance as Court Yard Hounds was on March 18, 2010 at the Americana Music Association's SXSW showcase in Austin, Texas. With Strayer on lead vocals she is backed up by her sister Martie, with other band members consisting of Natalie Maines' father, Lloyd Maines, on guitar, and other members from the Dixie Chicks' backing band; the debut album was also recorded in Maguire's home studio.

According to Maguire and Strayer, the Dixie Chicks have not parted ways. And still continue to make appearances including touring with the Eagles and Keith Urban in 2010 and appearing at selected events, such as the Calgary Stampede, in 2013.

Court Yard Hounds' second studio album, Amelita, was released on July 16, 2013. "Sunshine," the album's lead single, was released on June 10, 2013. In 2015, the Dixie Chicks announced a tour of Europe for the following year, later also announcing a tour in North America, their first tour in years.

== Discography ==
=== Studio albums ===
Title	Details	Peak chart positions							
Title	Details	US	US Rock	AUS	CAN	NZ	SWE	SWI	UK
Court Yard Hounds	Release date: May 4, 2010; Label: Open Wide/Columbia	7	3	42	6	30	58	47	79
Amelita	Release date: July 16, 2013; Label: Columbia Records	70	18	75	—	—	—	—	163
"—" denotes releases that did not chart

=== Singles ===
Year	Single	Peak positions	Album
Year	Single	US AAA	Album
2010	"The Coast"	26	Court Yard Hounds
2010	"It Didn't Make a Sound"	—	Court Yard Hounds
2010	"See You in the Spring"	—	Court Yard Hounds
2013	"Sunshine"	—	Amelita
2013	"The World Smiles"	—	Amelita
"—" denotes releases that did not chart

=== Guest appearances ===
Year	Song	Artist	Album
2015	"She Sang Hymns Out of Tune"	Don Henley (with Ashley Monroe)	Cass County

=== Music videos ===
Year	Video
2010	"It Didn't Make a Sound"
2014	"The World Smiles"
