= Grant Solomon =

American tennis player

Grant Steven Solomon
- Residence: Dallas, Texas
- Born: April 3, 1995 (age 29)
- Height: 5 ft 10 in (1.78 m)
- College: Harvard University
- Prize money: $1,618

Singles

Grand Slam singles results
- US Open: Q1
- US Open Junior: QF

Grant Solomon (born April 3, 1995) is a former tennis player from the United States. He is now an attorney at Weil, Gotshal & Manges in Washington, D.C.

== Early life and personal ==
Solomon was born April 3, 1995, and his dad is Jewish.

His parents Mark Solomon and Kathleen Wu are both attorneys. He attended Greenhill School from first grade through high school, graduating in 2014.

== Early tennis career ==
He was coached by Rodrigo Cerdera.

Solomon was featured in Sports Illustrated Magazine in Faces in the Crowd published in stores on May 14, 2014, for an undefeated high school career. He was one of the few tennis players to do so since the piece began. He joined the company of former and current professional athletes such as John McEnroe, Althea Gibson, Jack Nicklaus, Arthur Ashe, Billie Jean King, Kareem Abdul-Jabbar, Greg LeMond, Emmitt Smith, Spud Webb, Tiger Woods, Tim Tebow, Andy Roddick, and Marion Jones.

In high school, he was a four-time All-Southwest Preparatory Conference pick and a two-time All-American. He finished his Greenhill Hornets career with a 48–0 record, never dropping a set. He was touted as the number 3 recruit in the nation and, per the United States Tennis Association, was awarded a wildcard into the U.S. Open Qualifying after his pro circuit debut in Houston.

== Professional career ==
In February 2014, he had his biggest career victory over Kaichi Uchida of Japan (ITF Junior #3 and ATP #384) in the USTA Pro Circuit futures in Sunrise, Florida. Through Solomon's junior career, he tallied victories over fellow American Reilly Opelka, Canadian Brayden Schnur (ATP #92), Chilean Bastian Malla (ATP #362), Noah Rubin (ATP #163), and Jared Donaldson (ATP #48). Four of these five victories came on clay courts.

He has made three main draw ITF Pro Circuit appearances against Daniel Smethurst (ATP #230) and Evan King. He took Smethurst to three sets and dropped a 5–7, 6–2, 6–1 match. Against King, ATP #258, he lost 6-7(1), 1-6. He lost to Henry Choi in 3 sets in the Vancouver $15K ITF Pro Circuit Event. He most recently participated in the $150,000 2018 Irving Tennis Classic and lost in the final round of qualifying to former University of Tulsa All-American Or-Ram Harel. Solomon reached the quarterfinals of the ITF Pro Circuit event in Harlingen, Texas, partnering University of Texas tennis player, John Mee. He has also made two appearances at the ATP Challenger events at the $100,000 2014 Challenger of Dallas and at the ATP Challenger $50,000 in Cali, Colombia.

== College career ==
Solomon started playing for Harvard University as a freshman in the Fall of 2014. In his freshman year he was 16-7 in singles, 4-4 in doubles partner Alex Steinroeder, won the Eastern College Athletic Conference Men's Tennis title, earned an NCAA tournament berth starting in both singles and doubles, and was nominated for Harvard's Male Freshman Athlete of the Year. As a sophomore in 2015-16 he was 9-6 in singles, and 1-1 in doubles, and as a junior in 2016-17 he was 12-12 in singles, winning the 2017 Ivy League Men's Tennis title. He had a breakout senior year, leading the team in singles and doubles wins.
