= Ed Barnhart =

American archeologist (born 1968)

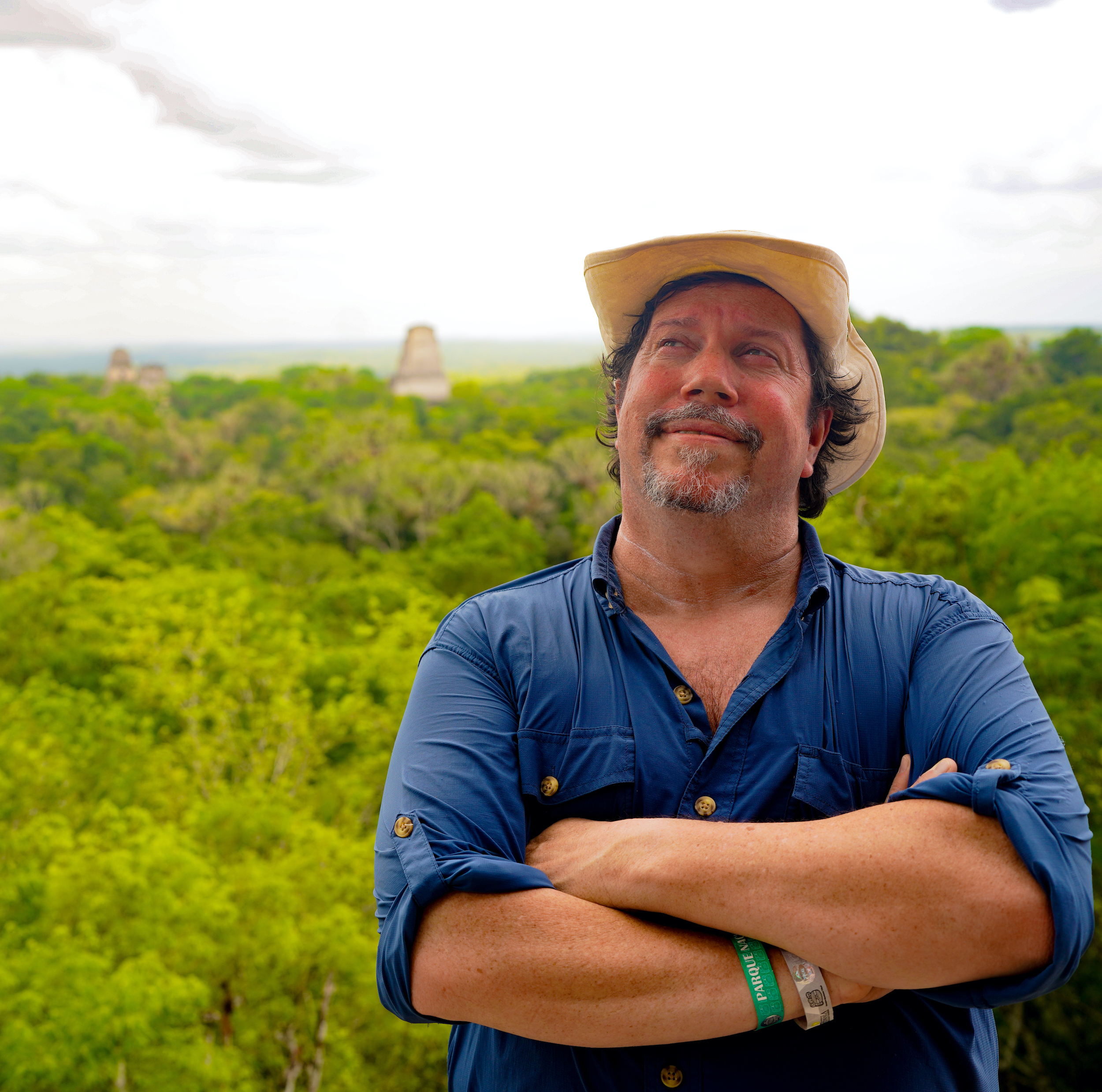
- Barnhart in 2021
- Born: October 29, 1968 (age 57); Englewood, New Jersey
- Occupation: Archaeologist
- Known for: Maya Exploration Center
- Scientific career
- Thesis: The Palenque mapping project: settlement and urbanism at an ancient Maya city (2001)
- Doctoral advisor: Brian Stross

Edwin Lawrence Barnhart (born October 29, 1968) is an American archaeologist and explorer specializing in ancient civilizations of the Americas. He is the founder and director of the Maya Exploration Center, president of Ancient Explorations, and fellow of the Explorers Club.

== Early life and education ==
Born in Englewood, New Jersey, on October 29, 1968, Barnhart attended Greenhill School in Addison, Texas. He grew up in Irving, Texas, where his early curiosity about ancient civilizations began. He obtained his undergraduate degree from the University of Colorado Boulder in 1992, with a double major in anthropology and Latin American studies. Barnhart studied under Linda Schele at the University of Texas at Austin, where he received his Ph.D. in anthropology in 2001.

== Career ==
Barnhart's early career focused on surveying and mapping in Mesoamerica. He re-discovered the city of Ma'ax Na ('spider-monkey house') in Belize in 1995. He also led the Palenque Mapping Project in 1998–2000, at the invitation of the Mexican government, which documented 1,478 structures in the Maya ruins of Palenque in Chiapas, Mexico.

Barnhart continues active research, including work on ancient civilizations in the rainforests of Central and South America. He has stated that archaeologists find evidence of "vast civilizations" regularly as new areas are explored, supporting theories about extensive pre-Columbian settlement in the region.

Barnhart is a public speaker on archaeology topics. He has appeared on the History Channel, the Discovery Channel, and on Japanese public television. He also produced five lecture series for the Teaching Company's Great Courses including "The Olmecs: Mesoamerica's Mysterious First Civilization" (2025) and has a podcast called ArchaeoEd.

In 2010, Barnhart developed a Maya calendar mobile app that received recognition from Archaeology magazine as an "Editors' Pick", with the publication praising the app for rising "above the silliness" surrounding Maya apocalypse claims.
