= Mother (Pink Floyd song) =

Song by Pink Floyd

from the album The Wall
- Released: 30 November 1979
- Recorded: April–November 1979
- Genre: Progressive rock; folk rock
- Length: 5:32
- Label: Harvest (UK); Columbia (US)
- Songwriter: Roger Waters
- Producers: Bob Ezrin; David Gilmour; James Guthrie; Roger Waters

Official audio
- "Mother" on YouTube

"Mother" is a song by the English rock band Pink Floyd from their eleventh studio album The Wall (1979).

== Composition ==
"Mother" is 5:32 in length. The majority of the song is in G major, though the chorus is predominantly a plagal cadence in C major. The song is notable for its varied use of time signatures, such as 5/8 and 9/8. Pink Floyd's drummer Nick Mason found these time-signature changes difficult to learn, and, with the band recording on a very tight schedule, ceded the drumming duties to American session drummer Jeff Porcaro.

The song begins quietly with solo voice and a single acoustic guitar, and gradually expands its instrumentation to include, by song's end, pump organ, piano, drums, electric bass, and electric guitar. The song has a short introduction, consisting only of a sharp inhalation and rapid exhalation before the first verses are sung by Roger Waters. The verse timing progression is: 5/8 - 8/8 × 4 - 5/8 - 8/8 × 8 - 6/8 - 8/8 × 2 - 5/8 - 8/8 × 4 - 5/8 - 8/8 × 8 - 6/8 - 8/8 × 3.

The chorus, sung by David Gilmour, starts on another measure of 8/8 before going into 6/8 (or "compound duple meter") for most of the chorus, in a narrative response to the first set of lyrics. There is also one measure of 9/8. A guitar solo follows over a chord progression in 4/4 time. Waters sings another verse, which is once more followed by Gilmour's chorus (with different lyrics). Finally, the song concludes with an arrangement stripped back down to one acoustic guitar and Waters's voice, and a ritardando in which Waters sings, "Mother, did it need to be so high?", a reference to the metaphorical wall constructed by the character Pink. The song ends on the subdominant, C major, which may create an "unfinished" or "dissatisfying" feeling.

Waters explained to Mojo magazine that the song is about "the idea that we can be controlled by our parents' views on things like sex. The single mother of boys, particularly, can make sex harder than it needs to be." "Most of the songs I've written have always followed the lyrics," he noted. "I've often tailored the music to fit the words, especially something like 'Money' or 'Mother'."

== Plot ==
The Wall tells the story of Pink, an embittered and alienated rock star. As told through the song "Mother", part of Pink's sense of alienation comes from being raised by an overprotective single mother, who lost her husband, Pink's father, in the Second World War. The song narrates a conversation by Pink (voiced by Waters) and his mother (voiced by Gilmour). The listener learns of the overprotectiveness of Pink's mother, who is helping Pink build his wall to try to protect him from the outside world, evidenced by the line "Of course Momma's gonna help build the wall", spoken by Pink's mother. She insists that Pink stay by her side even after he grows up, and cannot stand it when Pink eventually grows older and falls in love.

== Film version ==
For the film, the song was re-recorded completely with the exception of David Gilmour's guitar solo. One line of the lyrics, "Is it just a waste of time", became "Mother, am I really dying", as the original LP lyrics read. This change ties in with a brief subplot in the film where Pink contracts a fever after caring for a sick rat that died from it.

== Personnel ==
Pink Floyd

- David Gilmour – vocals (chorus), high strung acoustic guitars, electric guitar
- Roger Waters – vocals (verses), acoustic guitar, bass guitar

Additional musicians

- Bob Ezrin – harmonium, Hammond organ, piano
- Jeff Porcaro – drums

Personnel per Fitch and Mahon.

== Cover versions ==
On October 3, 2011, American rock band Pearl Jam performed "Mother" on Late Night with Jimmy Fallon, marking the end of the show's "Pink Floyd Week".

The 1990 The Wall – Live in Berlin concert featured a version of the song with Sinéad O'Connor on vocals, with Rick Danko, Levon Helm, and Garth Hudson of the Band on guitar, drums, and accordion, respectively, and Waters and the Hooters providing acoustic backup.

In 2003, A Fair Forgery of Pink Floyd, a tribute album of Pink Floyd cover versions was released; it included a version of "Mother" by the Chicano rock band Quetzal, called by AllMusic a "heart-ripping country rendition", and featuring a cajón, an accordion, and a violin solo.

American musician Natalie Maines covered "Mother" for her debut solo studio album, also titled Mother (2013). According to journalist Ann Powers, Maines' "interpretation of Roger Waters's lyrics helps the original becomes something new—something bigger".

Amanda Palmer released her cover of the song, orchestrated by Jherek Bischoff, on November 15, 2017. The accompanying video was funded by her Patreon subscribers. She dedicated the song and music video to "the current administration". The single features a cello solo by Zoë Keating. The video was directed by Jordan Rathus.

In the final episode of the American superhero television series, Legion, "Mother" was sung by Dan Stevens (as David Haller) and Stephanie Corneliussen (as Gabrielle Xavier).

== Certifications ==
| Region | Certification | Certified units/sales |
|---|---|---|
| New Zealand (RMNZ) | Gold | 15,000^{‡} |
^{‡} Sales+streaming figures based on certification alone.
