= Natalie Maines =

American singer-songwriter (born 1974)

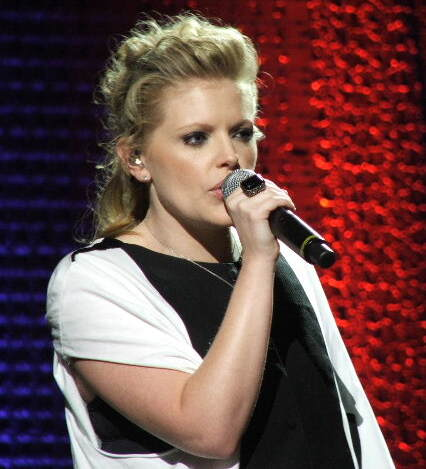
- Maines in Austin, Texas, 2006

Background information
- Also known as: Natalie Pasdar
- Born: Natalie Louise Maines; October 14, 1974 (age 52); Lubbock, Texas, U.S.
- Genres: Bluegrass; country; pop rock; country pop
- Occupations: Musician; songwriter
- Instruments: Vocals; guitar; bass
- Years active: 1995–present
- Labels: Open Wide; Columbia
- Member of: The Chicks
- Spouse(s): Michael Tarabay (m. 1997; div. 1999) Adrian Pasdar (m. 2000; div. 2019)
- Website: nataliemainesmusic.com

Signature
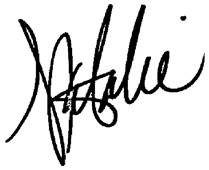

Natalie Louise Maines (born October 14, 1974) is an American musician. She is the lead vocalist for the country band the Chicks.

In 1995, after leaving Berklee College of Music, Maines was recruited by the Dixie Chicks to replace their lead singer, Laura Lynch. With Maines as lead vocalist, the band earned 10 Country Music Association Awards and 13 Grammy Awards for their work between 1998 and 2007.

In 2006, the Dixie Chicks released Taking the Long Way. The album subsequently won five Grammy Awards (including Album of the Year). The Chicks' latest album, Gaslighter was released on July 17, 2020. As a solo artist, Maines released the album, Mother, on May 7, 2013.

== Early life ==
Maines was born in Lubbock, Texas, to country musician and producer Lloyd Maines and Tina May Maines. She attended Nat Williams Elementary School in Lubbock, where her second-grade teacher recalls being told by Maines during a math lesson, "Teacher, I don't need to learn this stuff—I'm gonna be a star." Maines was a cheerleader while attending O. L. Slaton Junior High School. She graduated in 1992 from Lubbock High School where she had participated in the school choir. Maines has described growing up in conservative Texas, saying "I always rebelled against that. My parents sent me and my sister to public minority schools so I always felt like a hippie and a rebel. ... As a teenager I always loved not thinking in the way I knew the majority of people thought. I always stood up for minorities. ... I've always stood up for homosexuals. I just always had these really strong convictions about doing so."

Following the completion of high school, Maines attended several colleges. She spent two semesters pursuing an undeclared major at West Texas A&M. Her studies focused heavily on radio, and a year and a half at South Plains College. One of Maines's instructors at South Plains, and a former member of The Maines Brothers Band, Cary Banks, recalled "She was mostly into rock'n'roll, rhythm and blues ... alternative rock." When Banks encountered Maines on campus, he said that she usually needed to vent a little steam. "She would get into a lot of political arguments" at the predominantly Republican school, and was a fan of Texas Governor Ann Richards. "She's always been opinionated and hardheaded like her dad." In December 1994, Maines auditioned for and received a full vocal scholarship to Berklee College of Music. She pursued the diploma program at Berklee but dropped out before the completion of her studies. Even though Maines is from Lubbock, home of Texas Tech University, she only attended the 1995 summer course in "Introductory Wildlife".

== Career ==
Maine's first professional recording was lead vocals on the song "White Women's Clothes" on Andy Wilkinson's album Charlie Goodnight's Life in Poetry and Song. Maines's first commercially released work was background vocals on Pat Green's debut album, Dancehall Dreamer, produced by her father Lloyd Maines and released in 1995. At the end of 1995, at age 21, Maines joined the all-female country music band, then named Dixie Chicks, which had been performing since 1989, but which had been unsuccessful in gaining more than local attention. Maines replaced founding lead singer Laura Lynch. She plays guitar and bass in concert in the band.

Maines co-wrote six songs overall for the Chicks' next three albums, including the Billboard Hot Country Singles & Tracks chart number one hit "Without You" on Fly. She was a primary songwriter on all 14 tracks of the band's 2006 album Taking the Long Way which peaked on the Billboard 200 chart at No. 1. Taking the Long Way has the Billboard Hot 100 single "Not Ready to Make Nice", (Maines, Strayer, Erwin, Wilson) hitting No. 4 and for which the band won the songwriting Grammy Award, for Song of the Year. Maines considers the songwriting she did for Taking the Long Way "pure therapy" after the controversy that ensued over a comment Maines made from the stage in London that criticized U.S. President George W. Bush. "Everything felt more personal this time", Maines said about the album, "there's just more maturity, depth, intelligence. ... [These songs] feel more grown-up."

Maines collaborates with other musical artists, both as a member of the Chicks and as an individual singer. The Chicks first worked with Sheryl Crow in 1999 while performing for the Lilith Fair concert tour. Since then, the Chicks have worked with Crow on her Sheryl Crow and Friends: Live from Central Park album, a Crow remixed version of "Landslide" performed by the Chicks, and the Chicks' song "Favorite Year" from Taking the Long Way. Maines has performed with artists including Pat Green, Charlie Robison, Yellowcard, Stevie Nicks, Patty Griffin, Neil Diamond, Eddie Vedder, Pete Yorn and Ben Harper.

On May 7, 2013, Maines released a solo album entitled Mother. This was Maines's first album since the Chicks hiatus started in 2007. The album was co-produced by Ben Harper. The album contains Maines's interpretation of several cover songs, including Pink Floyd's "Mother", Eddie Vedder's "Without You", and Jeff Buckley's "Lover, You Should've Come Over". She also sings about motherhood, feminism, and painful relationships.

In September 2015, Maines was inducted into the West Texas Walk of Fame. The ceremony took place at Lubbock High School from where she graduated in 1992.

== Philanthropic works ==
Maines has participated in various fundraising and awareness events. They include:

- Legendary Bingo (August 23, 2007): Maines participated in "Legendary Bingo", a US bingo game hosted by drag queens and held weekly in Los Angeles. Proceeds from the event go to special charity interests; when Maines participated in the event, the proceeds benefited the "Voice for the Animals Foundation".
- St. Jude Benefit (June 12, 2008): Maines attended "Scrabble Under The Stars" in Beverly Hills, California. The event benefits St. Jude Children's Research Hospital. Scrabble boards autographed by celebrity attendees, including Maines, were auctioned through June 30, 2008.
- David Lynch Foundation: Maines with the Dixie Chicks was the headline performer at a benefit night honoring Rick Rubin at the Beverly Wilshire Hotel in February 2014.

== Personal life ==
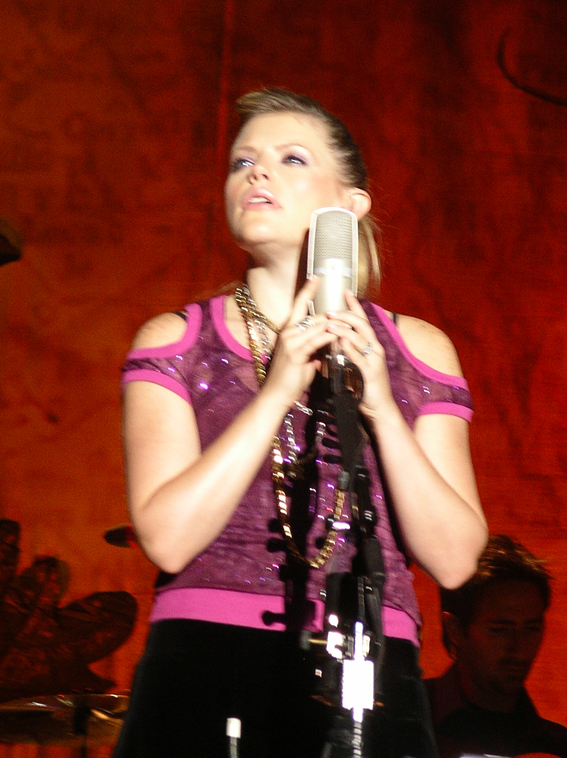
Maines in Glasgow 2003

In 1997, Maines married her South Plains College boyfriend, bassist Michael Tarabay, and the couple moved to Nashville, Tennessee. Within two years they filed for divorce, citing irreconcilable differences.

Maines met actor Adrian Pasdar in May 1999 at the wedding of bandmate Emily Erwin to Charlie Robison. Maines and Pasdar married on June 24, 2000, at A Little White Wedding Chapel in Las Vegas. They have two sons. During her marriage, Maines referred to herself as Natalie Pasdar. Maines filed for divorce in July 2017; it was finalized in December 2019. The events leading to her divorce inspired multiple songs on the 2020 album Gaslighter.

Maine practices transcendental meditation.

== Controversies ==
=== Iraq War criticism and aftermath ===
On March 10, 2003, nine days before the invasion of Iraq, the Dixie Chicks performed at the Shepherd's Bush Empire theater in London, England. It was the first concert of their Top of the World Tour in support of their sixth album, Home. Introducing their song "Travelin' Soldier", Maines told the audience the band did not support the upcoming Allied invasion of Iraq and were "ashamed" that President George W. Bush was from Texas.

Many American country music listeners supported the war, and Maines's remark triggered a backlash in the United States. The Dixie Chicks were blacklisted by thousands of country radio stations, and the band members received death threats. Maines issued an apology, saying her remark had been disrespectful; in 2006 she rescinded the apology, saying she felt Bush deserved no respect. The backlash damaged sales of their music and sales of their next album and tour.

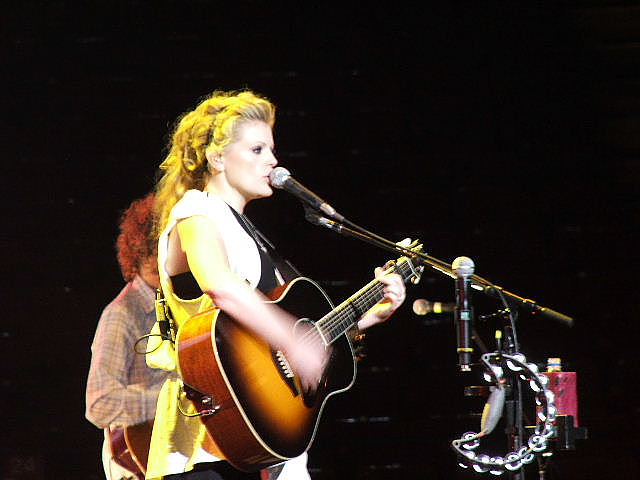
Maines performing with the Dixie Chicks during their "Accidents & Accusations Tour" on December 4, 2006

At the first US concert after Maines's comment, she said from the stage, "They told me that you may not come, but I knew you'd come because we have the greatest fans in the whole wide world." Despite fan turnout at concerts, the Dixie Chicks began receiving death threats as circulation of the comment increased. Subsequently, security was heightened at all concert venues and metal detectors were installed where possible. A death threat directed at Maines was received prior to the Dixie Chicks' concert on July 6, 2003, in Dallas, Texas. Maines described the threat as "scary because ... it wasn't just somebody wanting to write a hate letter. ... It was somebody who thought they had a plan." Security was heightened for the trip to and from the concert venue as well as at the arena.

On May 21, 2006, while promoting the release of the album Taking the Long Way, Maines recanted her 2003 apology to President Bush, saying, "I don't feel that way anymore. I don't feel he is owed any respect whatsoever. ... If people are going to ask me to apologize based on who I am ... I don't know what to do about that. I can't change who I am."

Maines says she is not looking for more battles but that "The Incident," as it is referred to by the Dixie Chicks, reminded her of how she "felt in high school: to be angry, to be sure that you're right and that the things you do matter. You don't realize that you're not feeling those feelings until you do. And then you realize how much more interesting life is."

Two 2006 documentaries, Protesting the Dixie Chicks and Shut Up And Sing, deal with the controversy surrounding Maines's comment and the ensuing fallout. In an interview with The Daily Telegraph on June 15, 2006, regarding the fallout from her comment, Maines again stirred up controversy by stating:

The entire country may disagree with me, but I don't understand the necessity for patriotism; Why do you have to be a patriot? About what? This land is our land? Why? You can like where you live and like your life, but as for loving the whole country ... I don't see why people care about patriotism.

In 2007, the Dixie Chicks won three Grammys for "Not Ready to Make Nice" and two Grammys for Taking the Long Way, receiving all five Grammys for which they were nominated. This was seen by some as vindication for the Dixie Chicks, who were shunned by country radio programmers after Maines's remarks about President Bush. As the Dixie Chicks accepted the album of the year award, Maines said, "I think people are using their freedom of speech with all these awards. We get the message."

=== Feud with Toby Keith ===
Maines had a public feud with fellow country music superstar Toby Keith over the 2002 chart-topping country hit "Courtesy of the Red, White and Blue", as well as a comment Maines made about U.S. President George W. Bush during a March 2003 Dixie Chicks concert in London.

Maines publicly criticized Keith's song "Courtesy of the Red, White and Blue" by saying, "I hate it. It's ignorant, and it makes country music sound ignorant. It targets an entire culture—and not just the bad people who did bad things. You've got to have some tact. Anybody can write, 'We'll put a boot in your ass.'" Keith responded by belittling Maines's songwriting skills with, "I'll bury her. She has never written anything that has been a hit" and, "That's what I do—I write songs."

After Maines commented at a March 2003 Dixie Chicks concert at the Shepherd's Bush Empire theatre in London that the Dixie Chicks didn't want the Iraq War and were "ashamed" President Bush "was from Texas", Keith's 2003 "Shock'n Y'all" tour began displaying a backdrop showing a doctored photo of Maines with Iraqi dictator Saddam Hussein. Shortly thereafter, on May 21, 2003, Maines wore a T-shirt with the letters "F.U.T.K." written on the front while performing for the Academy of Country Music Awards broadcast. The Dixie Chicks website stated that the letters stood for "Freedom, United, Together in Kindness". Many in the country music industry saw it as a veiled insult directed at Keith. The audience at the award show also booed the Dixie Chicks numerous times, the loudest being when their nomination for the Entertainer of the Year award was read out; Toby Keith subsequently won the award.

In the 2006 documentary Dixie Chicks: Shut Up and Sing, backstage footage prior to her appearance wearing the F.U.T.K. shirt recorded the conversation between Maines and Simon Renshaw and confirmed that the original intent of the shirt was in response to Keith's criticism of her: the letters stood for "Fuck You Toby Keith". As of January 2007, Keith continued to refuse to say Maines's name and argued that the doctored photos displayed during his concerts were intended to express his feeling that Maines's criticism was tyrannical and a dictator-like attempt to squelch Keith's free speech.

=== West Memphis Three lawsuit ===
Maines and other members of The Dixie Chicks participated in a rally in Little Rock, Arkansas, in late 2007, in support of the West Memphis Three, three imprisoned men convicted of the 1993 murder of three young boys in West Memphis, Arkansas. On August 19, 2011, Maines joined with Pearl Jam frontman Eddie Vedder in Jonesboro, Arkansas, supporting the release of the West Memphis Three.

== Discography ==
=== Solo ===
==== Studio albums ====
Title	Details	Peak chart positions				
Title	Details	US	US Digital	US Rock	US Taste	AUS
Mother	Release date: May 7, 2013; Label: Sony	17	10	4	7	50

==== Singles ====
Year	Single	Album
2013	"Without You"	Mother

=== Music videos ===
Year	Video
2013	"Without You"

=== Other appearances ===
List of guest appearances, with other performing artists, showing year released and album name
Title	Year	Other artist(s)	Album
"White Women's Clothes"	1994	none	Charlie Goodnight: His Life In Poetry And Song
"Dancehall Dreamer"	1995	Pat Green	Dancehall Dreamer
"Snowing on Raton"	1997	Pat Green	George's Bar
"The Wedding Song"	2001	Charlie Robison	Step Right Up
"Too Far From Texas"	2001	Stevie Nicks	Trouble in Shangri-La
"Abilene"	2002	Sheryl Crow	C'mon, C'mon
"El Cerrito Place"	2004	Charlie Robison	Good Times
"Mary"	2005	Patty Griffin	Songs for Tsunami Relief: Austin to South Asia
"How I Go"	2006	Yellowcard	Lights and Sounds
"The Man"	2006	Pete Yorn	Nightcrawler
"Don't Mean Nothing"	2006	Pete Yorn	Westerns EP
"Another Day (That Time Forgot)"	2008	Neil Diamond	Home Before Dark
"God Only Knows"	2011	none	Big Love
"Golden State (Live)"	2012	Eddie Vedder	Golden State (Live)
"Mother"	2013	none	West of Memphis: Voices for Justice
"Love Without Fear"	2014	Dan Wilson	Love Without Fear
"Too Much"	2014	Dan Wilson	Love Without Fear
"The Wayfaring Stranger"	2015	Robert Earl Keen	Happy Prisoner: The Bluegrass Sessions
"Who I Want You To Love"	2015	Bleachers	Terrible Thrills, Vol. 2
"Knockin' At My Door"	2016	Smooth Hound Smith	Sweet Tennessee Honey
"The Boots That Got Us There"	2016	Smooth Hound Smith	Sweet Tennessee Honey

== Awards ==
=== Individual ===
- 2003: VH1 Big in '03: Big Quote of '03
