= Martie Maguire =

American musician (born 1969)

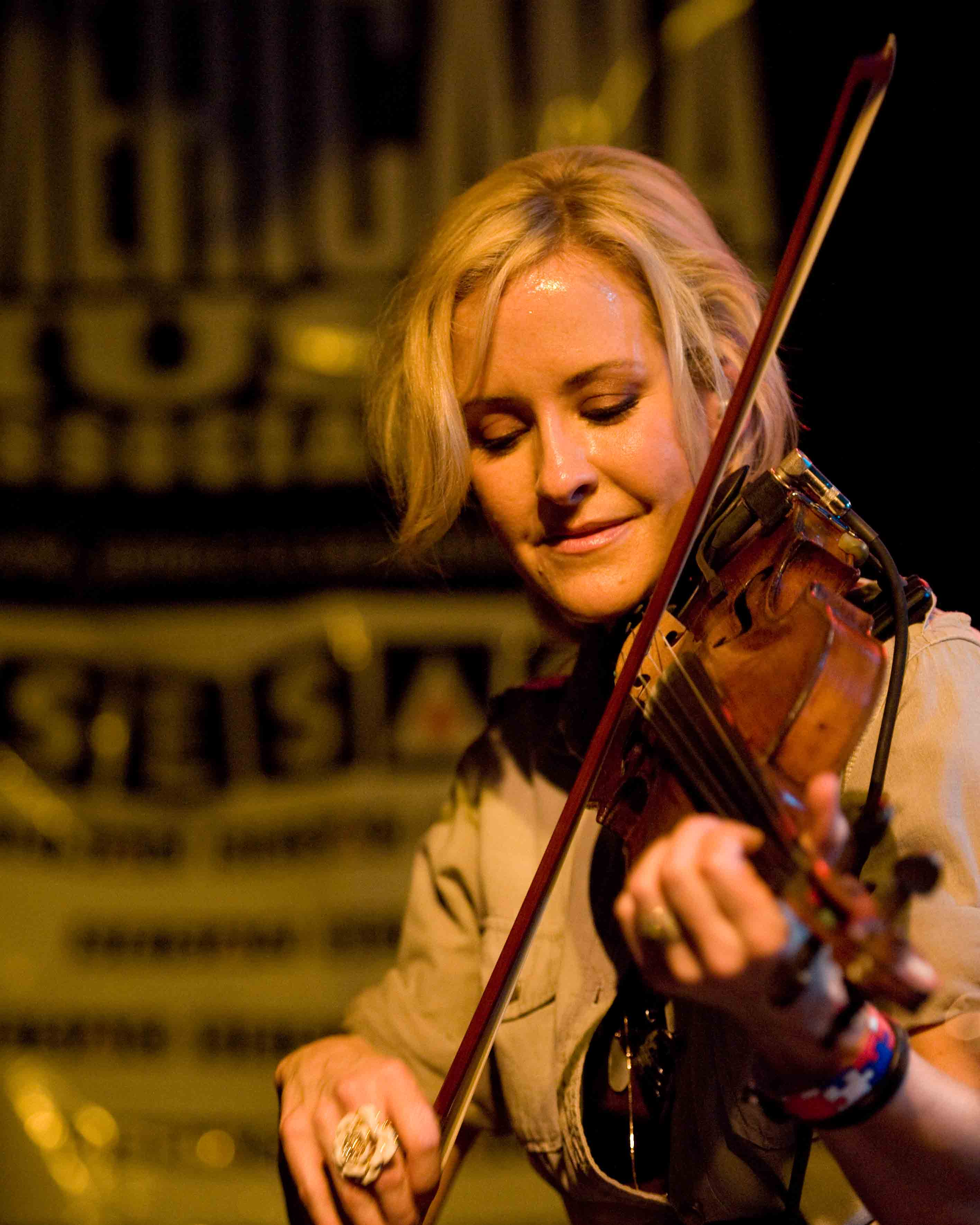
- Maguire in 2010

Background information
- Also known as: Martie Seidel, Martie Maguire
- Born: Martha Elenor Erwin; October 12, 1969 (age 56); York, Pennsylvania, U.S.
- Genres: Alternative country; country; bluegrass; country rock; folk
- Occupations: Musician; songwriter; record producer; arranger
- Instruments: Violin; viola; guitar; double bass; mandolin; vocals; fiddle
- Years active: 1989–present
- Labels: SonyBMG; Open Wide; Columbia
- Member of: The Chicks
- Formerly of: Court Yard Hounds
- Spouses: Ted Seidel (m. 1995; div. 1999) Gareth Maguire (m. 2001; div. 2013) Clem Moore (m. 2022)
- Website: thechicks.com courtyardhounds.com

Signature
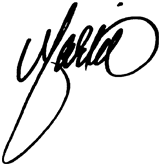

Martha Elenor Maguire (née Erwin, previously Seidel; October 12, 1969) is an American musician who is a founding member of the country band the Chicks and the country bluegrass duo Court Yard Hounds. She won awards in national fiddle championships while still a teenager. Maguire is accomplished on several other instruments, including the mandolin, viola, double bass and guitar. She has written and co-written a number of the band's songs, some of which have become chart-topping hits. She also contributes her skills in vocal harmony and backing vocals, as well as orchestrating string arrangements for the band.

Martie learned several instruments at a young age, honing her skills with her younger sister, Emily and two schoolmates (a brother and sister team, Troy and Sharon Gilchrist) for over five years as a part of a touring bluegrass quartet while in high school. After graduation, the sisters forged an alliance with two other women they had met through the Dallas music scene, Laura Lynch and Robin Lynn Macy, forming a bluegrass and country music band, busking and touring the bluegrass festival circuits for six years. After the departure of Macy, and the replacement of Lynch with singer Natalie Maines, the band widened their musical repertoire and appearance. The result was a trio so commercially successful that it took the country music industry by surprise, with 19 singles hitting the Billboard Country Charts, 2 Diamond Albums, 2 Platinum albums, and 13 Grammy Awards. Maguire subsequently stood by her bandmates as they were engulfed in a 2003 controversy for criticizing George W. Bush, which led to the Chicks receiving less airplay from several country radio stations.

== Early life ==
Martha Elenor Erwin, nicknamed Martie, was born October 12, 1969, in York, Pennsylvania.

Encouraged by her parents – educators at private schools – Martie began playing violin at age five, and by age 12, started to learn to play "fiddle style" after receiving a birthday gift of fiddle lessons. She also was active in her school orchestra.

Her sister Emily shared her love and interest in music, and displayed early talent herself. The two sisters were provided musical instruction on several instruments, and their talent for vocal harmony continued to be nurtured. Although Maguire became famous for her harmony and mastery of the fiddle, she also plays a variety of strings that include the viola, guitar, mandolin, and double bass. Maguire composes songs and arranges the use of stringed instruments for concert and recording performances.

== Early career ==
By 1983, Martie was touring with her sister Emily and school friends siblings Troy and Sharon Gilchrist. The sisters showed an "almost obsessive" interest in busking at small venues and attending bluegrass festivals. The four students formed the teenage bluegrass group "Blue Night Express", playing together for five years, from 1984 to 1989, while still attending private Greenhill School. "We'd drive down to the west end of Dallas and open our cases, and that was our job," Martie said of it in a later interview to 60 Minutes II correspondent Dan Rather. "That's how we made money in high school." Also while in high school Martie performed at Six Flags Over Texas in Arlington, TX, in a strolling duo with Troy Gilchrist for a summer.

In 1987, Martie was awarded second place for the fiddle in the National fiddle championships held yearly in Winfield, Kansas. Upon graduation from high school, with Emily still in high school, she spent a year attending college at Southwestern University in Georgetown, Texas, from 1988 to 1989. She performed in the school orchestra there and again competed in the national fiddle championships at the Walnut Valley Festival, in Winfield, earning third place that year.

In the 90s she played occasionally with the slo-core band, Bedhead.

== The Chicks ==
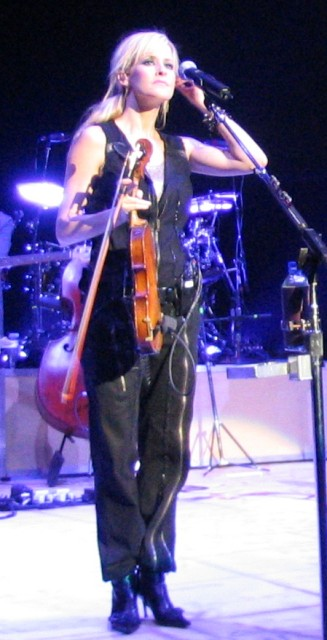
Maguire at Royal Albert Hall, 2003

In 1989, Martie and Emily joined guitarist Robin Lynn Macy and Laura Lynch on double bass in the Dixie Chicks, playing what was at the time predominantly bluegrass music and a mix of country standards. Originally listed as Martha, and then Martie Erwin, she played fiddle, mandolin, viola and harmonized with Emily on backing vocals.

Martie had begun writing and recording songs on their debut independent album, Thank Heavens for Dale Evans, and in 2001, one song co-written with Laura Lynch called "Pink Toenails" resurfaced. The song was featured in the film, Don't Say A Word, with Skye McCole Bartusiak performing the song.

When their second album had a more polished sound, Martie commented, "I hope our fans won't be disappointed [in The Little Ol' Cowgirl]; it's got drums on every track; it's no longer bluegrass, but we have to make a living and you can't do that playing bluegrass."

Two albums later, after Natalie Maines became the lead vocalist of the Chicks, the band's commercial success skyrocketed. Martie said of their music, "It's very rootsy, but then Natalie comes in with a rock and blues influence. That gave Emily and I [sic] a chance to branch out, because we loved those kinds of music but felt limited by our instruments."

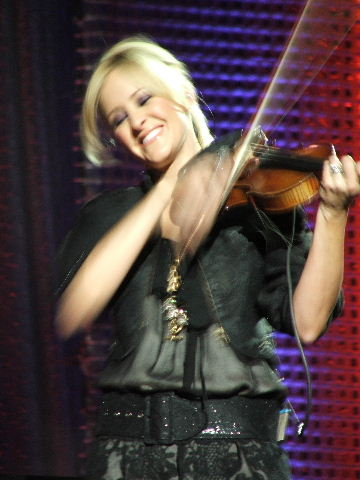
Martie Maguire with the Dixie Chicks in Austin, TX, 2006

Martie co-wrote the song, "Cowboy Take Me Away" on the Chicks' album Fly for her sister Emily. It was a tribute to Emily's courtship with country music writer/singer Charlie Robison. Martie was singled out by BMI in 2000, and awarded Songwriter of the Year for writing and/or co-writing "Cowboy Take Me Away", "Ready To Run" and "You Were Mine". "You Were Mine" was co-written by the sisters about their parents' divorce.

In 1999, the Dixie Chicks performed two songs, recording a cover of the song, "You Can't Hurry Love" as well as Martie's "Ready to Run" for the Julia Roberts/ Richard Gere film Runaway Bride. In 2003, Martie was nominated for a Tony Award for co-composing the film score to Urban Cowboy; the musical used her "Cowboy Take Me Away".

After the band achieved massive commercial success with its first two Sony studio albums with Maines, they struggled with their record company over artistic direction on the third. Martie commented, "I don't think any of us ever trusted Nashville. When you're in that town you know everybody is talking about everybody else. Everybody is wishing for the other guy to fail."

Although Martie and Emily often appear quiet and demure compared to their animated bandmate Natalie Maines, the trio have stood united on controversial subjects since they banded together to play in 1995, even when their opinions have had the potential to serve them more harm than good. In 2006, Martie said, "I'd rather have a smaller following of really cool people who get it, who will grow with us as we grow and are fans for life, than people that have us in their five-disc changer with Reba McEntire and Toby Keith. We don't want those kinds of fans. They limit what you can do."

== Court Yard Hounds ==
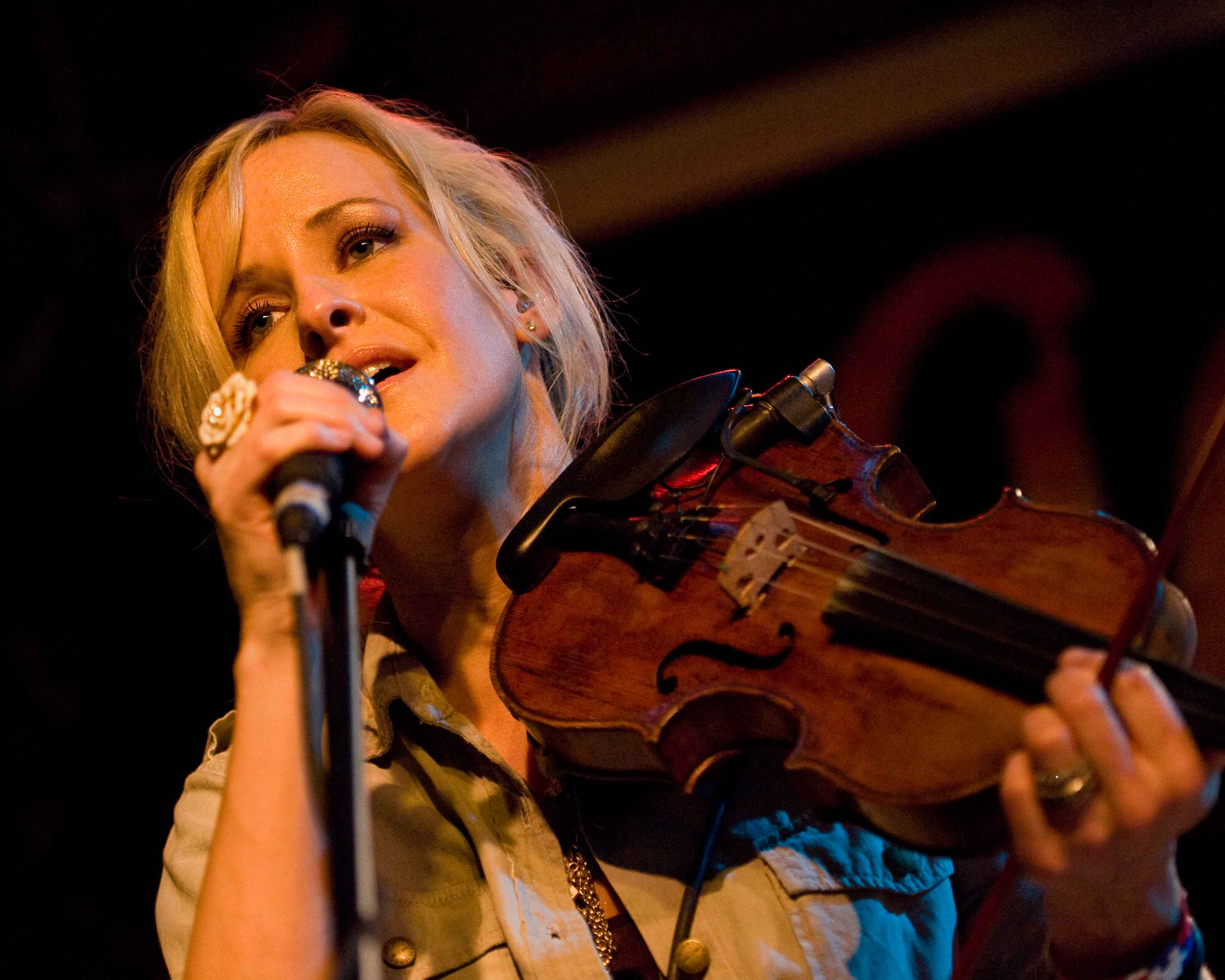
Maguire performing at Antone's in Austin, with the Court Yard Hounds; March 18, 2010

With Natalie Maines taking a break from music, Martie was working on a solo fiddle album; however, it was announced in January 2010 that she and sister Emily Strayer have formed a side project called the Court Yard Hounds, with Emily on lead vocals. The band made their live debut in March at South by Southwest with an album released in May 2010.

== Personal life ==
Martie married pharmaceutical representative Ted Seidel on June 17, 1995, and changed her last name to Seidel. She also was stepmother to his son. However, her marriage did not last, and she and Ted Seidel were divorced in November 1999.

At bandmate Natalie Maines' sister Kim's wedding, Martie met Gareth Maguire, a Roman Catholic teacher and actor from Carnlough, Northern Ireland. The couple became engaged in June 2001 and married on August 10, 2001, in a civil ceremony in Hawaii; as explained at one of their concerts, the Dixie Chicks' song "White Trash Wedding" is based on Martie's relationship with Gareth. Later they had a Catholic "blessing" ceremony in the groom's hometown, Carnlough in County Antrim, Northern Ireland, on March 9, 2002, for all the guests that were not able to attend the first wedding. Martie said of the ceremony that the Catholic Church would not permit a wedding service due to her prior divorce. Martie said that there were many "special" people that they had wanted to include, but that they just could not wait to marry. Another reason for the rush was Gareth's need to keep flying back and forth between the United States and Ireland because of visa considerations. After her second marriage, Martie changed her name to that of her new husband, which is why in her musical career she has been credited by all three of her surnames: Erwin, Seidel, and Maguire.

Martie and her second husband had three daughters together. Their third daughter was born in 2008. The couple divorced in 2013. In February 2022, it was revealed Martie is married to Clem Moore.

Martie has been frank about using in vitro fertilization to conceive their daughters. In an interview in Conceive, she said, "All my paperwork said 'unspecified origin.' We spent three years of active trying before we went to IVF. First I went on Clomid. Then I had some dye tests and found I had a collapsed tube, so I had laparoscopic surgery; the tube wasn't blocked, just spasming." After three attempts at intrauterine insemination, she said, she and her husband didn't think it was worth continuing in that manner, and switched to IVF. In August 2007, Martie began IVF again, resulting in their third daughter. In 2008, regarding the number of children the Dixie Chicks had produced in the past seven years (Maines had two; Emily had four in addition to Martie's twins and newborn), Martie told People "We'll have to move over and let the little chicks take over! We've got a new band!"

Martie and Emily co-wrote a song, "So Hard", about their own personal experiences with infertility and their need to rely on other methods to conceive. They speak out about the difficulties they faced, but also their good fortune; both having options that for many women are financially prohibitive. Mentioning the stigma attached to IVF, Martie said, "I think we feel a responsibility to break down some barriers. It's much more of a common problem than people realize." A final concern Martie mentioned was the question of what to do with all the unused frozen embryos.

Now that I have children, I see those embryos as possible children. So I have to think about what my options are if there are leftovers again. I could keep them in storage, and maybe they will help my children some day. Or I can try to donate them to stem cell research. I don't think I could give them to another family. I would always worry: what if it's an abusive family? What if they don't get enough love?

Natalie Maines has noted that she and Martie learned Transcendental Meditation in the mid-1990s.

== Discography ==
- Martie played fiddle on the song, "Somewhere Down The Road" on the eponymous album, Deryl Dodd by Deryl Dodd on Sony.
- Martie also played fiddle on The Flatlanders' adaptation of Woody Guthrie's "Sowing on the Mountain" on their 2009 album Hills and Valleys.
- As part of the Court Yard Hounds, Martie played fiddle and provided harmony vocals on the song "She Sang Hymns Out Of Tune" on the Cass County album by Don Henley.
