= Emily Strayer =

American songwriter, singer, multi-instrumentalist (b. 1972)

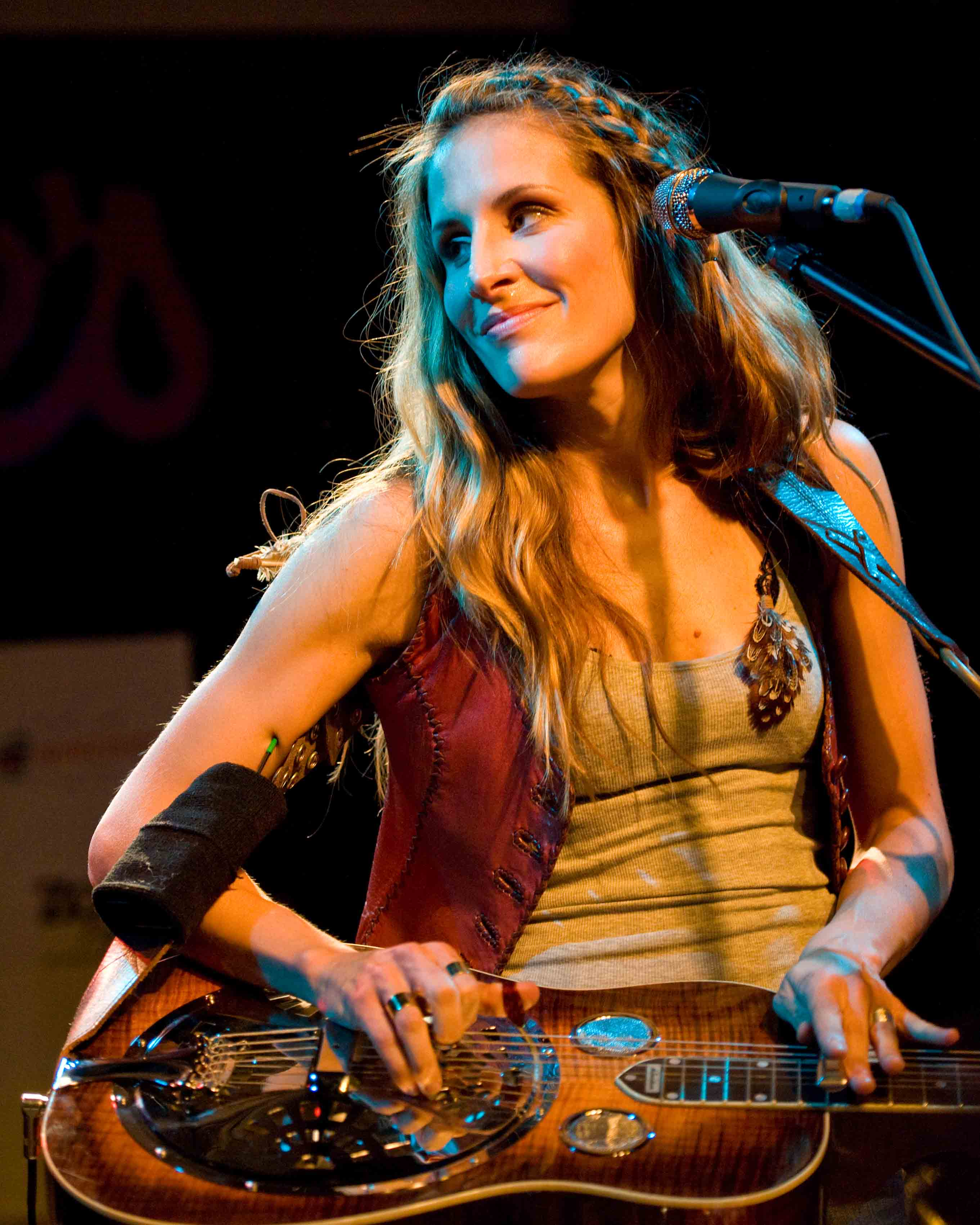
- Emily Strayer in 2010

Background information
- Also known as: Emily Robison
- Born: Emily Burns Erwin; August 16, 1972 (age 54); Pittsfield, Massachusetts, U.S.
- Origin: Dallas, Texas, U.S.
- Genres: Alternative country; country; bluegrass; country rock; folk
- Occupations: Musician; singer; songwriter; record producer
- Instruments: Banjo; accordion; guitar; double bass; mandolin; sitar; piano; violin; vocals
- Years active: 1989–present
- Labels: SonyBMG; Open Wide; Columbia
- Member of: The Chicks
- Formerly of: Court Yard Hounds
- Spouses: Charlie Robison (m. 1999; div. 2008) Martin Strayer (m. 2013)
- Website: thechicks.com courtyardhounds.com

Signature
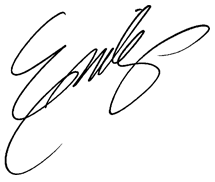

Emily Burns Strayer (née Erwin, previously Robison; born August 16, 1972) is an American songwriter, singer, multi-instrumentalist, and a founding member of the country band the Chicks, formerly known as the Dixie Chicks. Strayer plays banjo, dobro, guitar, lap steel, bass, mandolin, accordion, fiddle, piano, and sitar. Initially in her career with the Chicks, she limited her singing to harmony with backing vocals, but within her role in the Court Yard Hounds, she took on the role of lead vocalist.

== Early life ==
Emily Erwin was born in Pittsfield, Massachusetts. Parents Paul Erwin and Barbara Trask moved the family to the suburban town of Addison, Texas, on the northern edge of Dallas, where she was raised with her two older sisters, Julia and Martha. Her parents were both educators and nurtured the growing interest that both Emily and Martha (later nicknamed Martie) shared, and together both sisters became proficient on several instruments while in elementary school.

Emily began playing the violin at age seven, and the banjo at age ten, afterward learning all the string instruments she could find. Years later, Martie joked that Emily was better than she at the fiddle, and because she wanted to keep the fiddle as her instrument, she forced Emily to learn something else. Emily responded by mastering the five string banjo, by reading books to teach herself the chord progressions.

From 1984–1989, Jane Frost (Director of the Patsy Montana Museum and the Walnut Valley Festival in Winfield, Kansas) remembers watching the sisters mature, teaming up with schoolmates Troy and Sharon Gilchrist. The foursome were touring in a teenage bluegrass group they named the Blue Night Express, in part because of the amount of traveling they had to do to reach far away festivals, frequently with a parent or friend of the family towing them back home long after dark at night. They thought it was worth the sacrifices to meet their musical heroes and experienced the friendly camaraderie and tricks of the trade on instruments from others. The sisters were said to have an "almost obsessive" interest in busking at small venues and attending bluegrass festivals. After Martie graduated from secondary school at Greenhill School with Emily still completing her studies, both remained active in the bluegrass scene.

== The Chicks ==
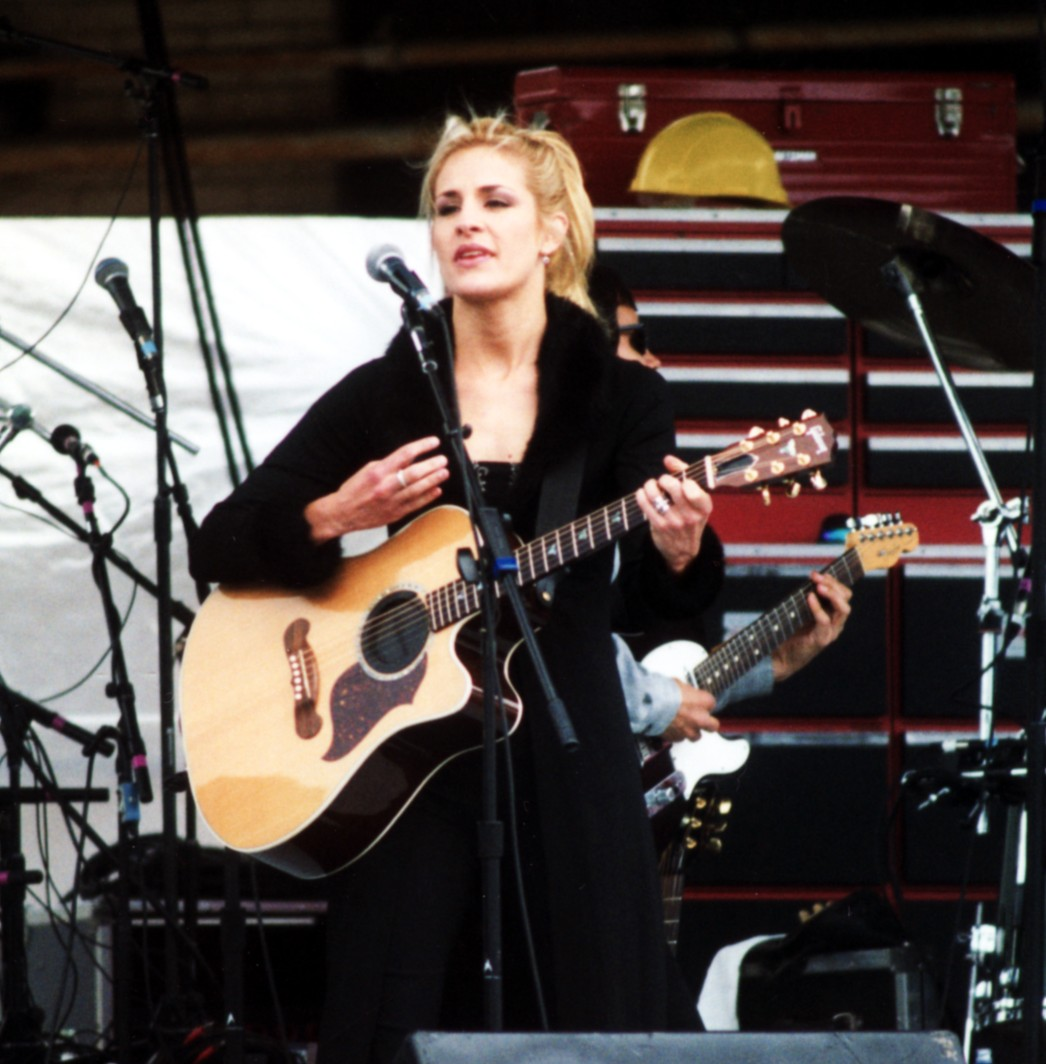
With the Dixie Chicks; 1998

In 1989, after years of attending bluegrass festivals and busking where they could, Emily joined her sister Martie, guitarist Robin Lynn Macy, and upright bass player Laura Lynch. Frost, again, recalls being privy to the discussion that the four women had about the possibility of a successful career as musicians together. Martie felt they could do well. Robin said, ".. It's going to be a 'hot' band," to which Emily responded, "I give it six months, and if we aren't making money by then, I'm out of here!". Emily was shy, and the youngest member of the group. She had enjoyed playing throughout school, but was at an age where she was already entertaining thoughts of working hard to be accepted by the United States Air Force Academy.

By 1993, the band had evolved into a new direction. Macy left the group for a "purer" bluegrass sound. Lynch, thrust into the position of sole lead singer, was replaced by the sisters in 1995 with singer composer Natalie Maines after the group was unable to garner anything more than local interest. Emily commented, "We were prepared to pay our dues for as long as it took; we were prepared for longevity. We know that we will always be playing music together, so we wanted to find someone who is just as determined and energetic as we are."

But in later interviews, the sisters revealed what many had thought for a long time: the reason Lynch was replaced was not commitment but a perceived lack of talent. In an article in the April/May edition of Country Music Magazine, Emily stated, "We felt we needed the next calibre of singer."

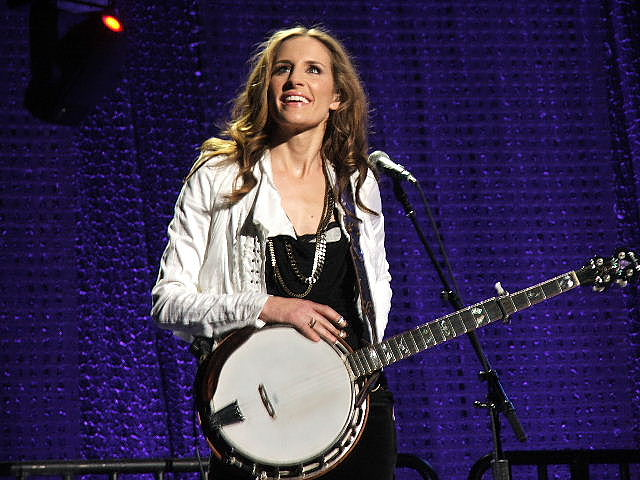
Emily in concert with the Dixie Chicks, Austin, Texas, 2006

From there, massive commercial success ensued, with their 1998 and 1999 albums Wide Open Spaces and Fly both achieving diamond record status. Emily was a key element of the group's look, with her hair dyed blond to match the other two at first, and then allowing it to return to her natural brunette color, and distinguishing herself visually from the other two. Emily and Martie's instrumental virtuosity set the Dixie Chicks apart from many other country acts, male and female. Emily's songwriting has also been a factor in the Chicks' recording career.

Emily stood by Maines when the controversy over Maines' remarks about U.S. President George W. Bush hit the newswire on the eve before the Iraq War in 2003. She was the only bandmate to realize that - while in the U.K., there was a big anti-war sentiment in the audience - back in the United States, Maines' criticism of President Bush would not be well received. Nevertheless, even when her home was trashed, and plenty of editorials were predicting the end of the Dixie Chicks' successful careers in music, she remained loyal to Maines, as did her sister.

== Court Yard Hounds ==
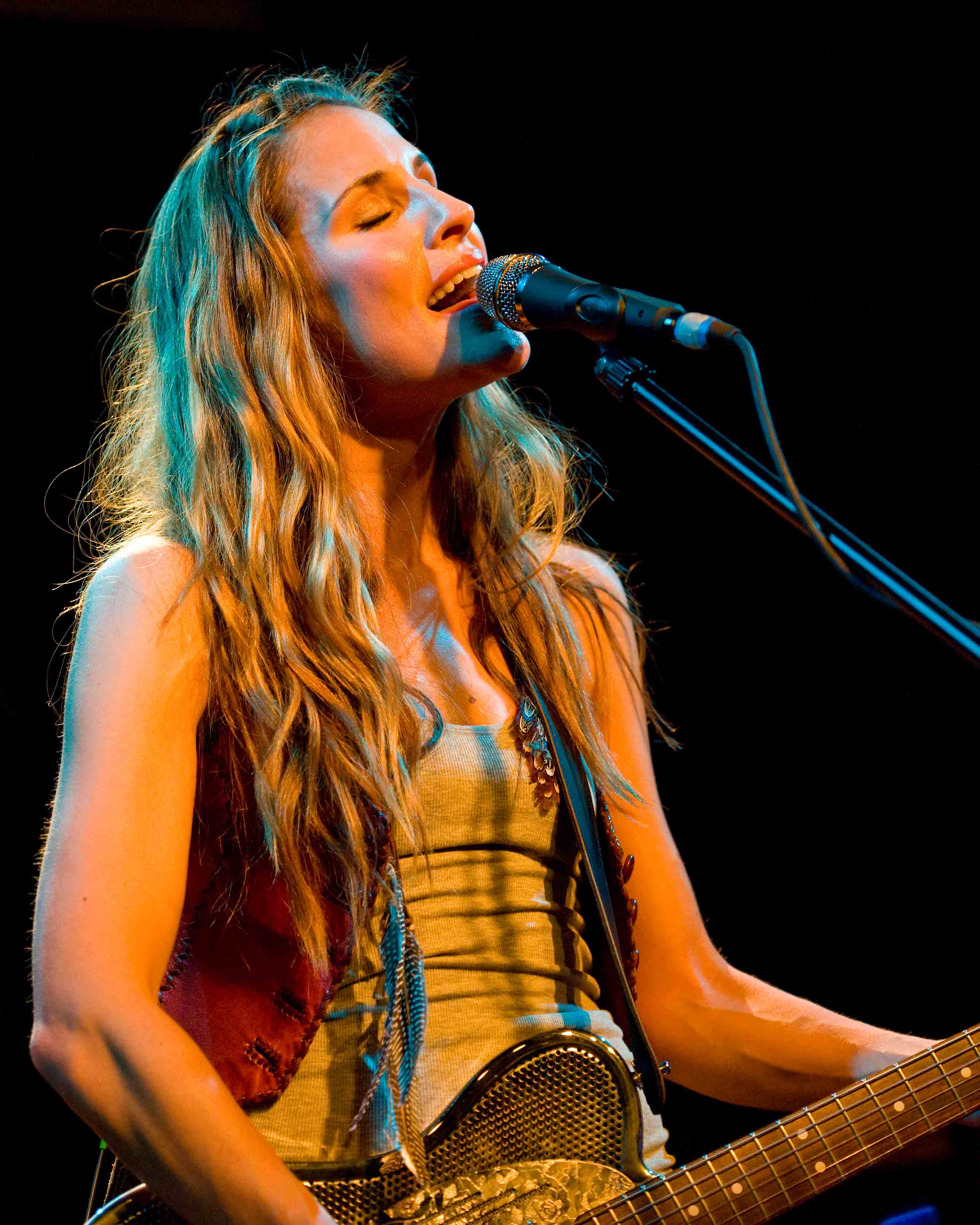
Emily with the Court Yard Hounds at Antone's, SXSW, March 18, 2010

Emily spent at least half of her life busking and touring nearly non-stop since high school, first with her older sister, and then with the changing lineups of the Dixie Chicks. After the bandmates celebrated their five Grammy Awards for Taking the Long Way, the trio all had young children and took time out to spend with them, but Emily was eager to return to writing and touring. When Emily's marriage came to an end, she began expressing herself by songwriting. Some of her compositions include her feelings about the breakup with her former husband, and expected that soon, the band would resume its former schedule of writing and performing, but Natalie Maines was reluctant to do so. After four years, Emily became "angry and frustrated", and in sending her new songs to her sister, conveyed her increasing disappointment. With Natalie Maines taking a break from music, Rolling Stone magazine announced in January 2010 that Emily and sister Martie have formed a side project called the Court Yard Hounds, with Emily as lead vocalist. The band made their live debut in March at South by Southwest with an album released in May 2010. Emily wrote all but one of the songs on their album.

== Personal life ==
On May 1, 1999, she married country singer Charlie Robison. Their wedding was held at the Cibolo Creek Ranch. Martie Maguire later revealed on a VH1 program that during their courtship, she had written the romantic hit song, "Cowboy Take Me Away" for them. They have three children. They divorced on August 6, 2008.

She became romantically involved with Martin Strayer while composing the Court Yard Hounds album. With Strayer, she has a daughter. The couple later married in 2013.
