= Wide Open Spaces (album) =

Studio album by Dixie Chicks
- Released: January 27, 1998
- Genre: Country
- Length: 43:39
- Label: Monument
- Producers: Blake Chancey; Paul Worley

Dixie Chicks chronology
Shouldn't a Told You That (1993)	Wide Open Spaces (1998)	Fly (1999)

Singles from Wide Open Spaces
- 1. "I Can Love You Better" Released: October 27, 1997; 2. "There's Your Trouble" Released: March 30, 1998; 3. "Wide Open Spaces" Released: August 17, 1998; 4. "You Were Mine" Released: December 7, 1998; 5. "Tonight the Heartache's on Me" Released: April 12, 1999

Wide Open Spaces is the fourth studio album and the major label debut of American country music band Dixie Chicks. It was their first record with new lead vocalist Natalie Maines, and became their breakthrough commercial success. It received diamond status by the RIAA on February 20, 2003, in the United States, having shipped 13 million units worldwide, while spending more than six years in the Australian ARIA music charts Country Top 20.

"Once You've Loved Somebody" had previously been recorded by John & Audrey Wiggins on their 1996 album, The Dream.

Wide Open Spaces, as well as their next albums Fly (1999) and Home (2002), were released in the HDCD format.

In 2024, the album was selected for preservation in the United States National Recording Registry by the Library of Congress as being "culturally, historically, or aesthetically significant".

== Critical reception ==
Professional ratings
Review scores
Source	Rating
AllMusic	5/5 stars
Christgau's Consumer Guide	(2-star Honorable Mention)
Los Angeles Times	3/4 stars
The Rolling Stone Album Guide	3.5/5 stars

Upon its release, Wide Open Spaces received favorable reviews from critics. Music critic Robert Christgau gave the album a two-star honorable mention, simply stating that the "blonds have more brains (than they get credit for)." Los Angeles Times wrote that "this tradition-rooted Texas trio knows its way around country, western, honky-tonk, bluegrass, folk and country-rock." Concluding the review, it deemed that the "range, plus their sweet, assured three-part harmonies, Natalie Maines' attractively steely lead vocals, and savvy song selection have propelled this major-label debut into the Top 10."

In a retrospective review by Stephen Thomas Erlewine of AllMusic, he stated that it hit a "sweet spot" and described the album as "appealing to many different audiences" and "eclectic without being elitist." He described Natalie Maines' voice as "powerful" and "bluesy" to "give these songs a compelling center" and "versatile" to "[negotiate] the twists and turns of these songs without a hitch, easily moving from the vulnerability of "You Were Mine" to the snarl of "Give It Up or Let Me Go." Concluding his review, he praised the "remarkably wide range" as "effortlessly eclectic" and the group for "bringing [the album] all together with their attitude and understated musicality."

== Track listing ==
No.	Title	Writer(s)	Length
1.	"I Can Love You Better"	Pamela Brown Hayes; Kostas	3:53
2.	"Wide Open Spaces"	Susan Gibson	3:44
3.	"Loving Arms"	Tom Jans	3:37
4.	"There's Your Trouble"	Mark Selby; Tia Sillers	3:10
5.	"You Were Mine"	Emily Strayer; Martie Maguire	3:37
6.	"Never Say Die"	George Ducas; Radney Foster	3:56
7.	"Tonight the Heartache's on Me"	Mary W. Francis; Johnny MacRae; Bob Morrison	3:25
8.	"Let 'Er Rip"	Billy Crain; Sandy Ramos	2:49
9.	"Once You've Loved Somebody"	Thom McHugh; Bruce Miller	3:28
10.	"I'll Take Care of You"	JD Souther	3:40
11.	"Am I the Only One (Who's Ever Felt This Way)"	Maria McKee	3:25
12.	"Give It Up or Let Me Go"	Bonnie Raitt	4:55
Total length:			43:39

== Personnel ==
Compiled from liner notes.

The Dixie Chicks

- Natalie Maines – vocals
- Emily Erwin – acoustic guitar, banjo, Dobro, vocals
- Martie Seidel – fiddle, mandolin, vocals

Additional personnel

- Mark Casstevens – acoustic guitar
- Bobby Charles, Jr. – bass guitar
- Joe Chemay – bass guitar
- Billy Crain – acoustic guitar
- Lloyd Maines – steel guitar
- George Marinelli – electric guitar
- Greg Morrow – drums
- Tommy Nash – electric guitar on "Give It Up or Let Me Go"
- Tony Paoletta – steel guitar on "Give It Up or Let Me Go"
- Michael Rhodes – bass guitar
- Tom Roady – shaker, congas, tambourine
- Matt Rollings – piano, Hammond organ
- Billy Joe Walker, Jr. – acoustic guitar, electric guitar
- Paul Worley – acoustic guitar, electric guitar

Technical

- Chuck Ainlay – mixing on "Give It Up or Let Me Go"
- Jim Burnett – Pro Tools editing
- Blake Chancey – production
- Don Cobb – digital editing
- Carlos Grier – digital editing
- John Guess – mixing
- Eric Legg – recording
- Denny Purcell – mastering
- Billy Sherrill – recording on "Give It Up or Let Me Go"
- Paul Worley – production

== Accolades ==
At the 41st Grammy Awards, the album was awarded two Grammy Awards out of three nominations. It was awarded Best Country Album (the first of what would be four trophies in this category: they would later win for Fly in 2000, Home in 2003, and Taking the Long Way in 2007) and for Best Country Performance by a Duo or Group with Vocal for the song "There's Your Trouble". This is an award the Chicks would win five times: in 2000 for "Ready to Run", in 2003 for "Long Time Gone", in 2005 for "Top of the World" and 2007 for "Not Ready to Make Nice", a feat only matched by The Judds. In addition, the Chicks were nominated for Best New Artist in 1999.

Organization	Nominee / work	Award	Result	Ref.
Academy of Country Music Awards	Wide Open Spaces	Album of the Year	Won	
Blockbuster Entertainment Awards	Wide Open Spaces	Favorite Duo or Group - Country	Won	
Canadian Country Music Association	Wide Open Spaces	Top Selling Album of the Year	Won	
Country Music Association Awards	"Wide Open Spaces"	Single of the Year	Won	
Country Music Association Awards	"Wide Open Spaces"	Music Video of the Year	Won	
CMT Music Awards	Wide Open Spaces	Album of the Year	Nominated	
Grammy Awards	Wide Open Spaces	Best Country Album	Won	
Grammy Awards	"There's Your Trouble"	Best Country Performance by a Duo or Group with Vocal	Won	
Radio Music Awards	"Wide Open Spaces"	Country Song of the Year	Won	
TNN/Music City Awards	Wide Open Spaces	Album of the Year	Nominated	

== Charts ==
=== Weekly charts ===
Chart (1998–1999)	Peak position
Canada Top Albums/CDs (RPM)	16
Canada Country Albums (RPM)	1
US Billboard 200	4
US Top Country Albums (Billboard)	1
US Heatseekers Albums (Billboard)	1

=== Year-end charts ===
Chart (1998)	Position
Canada Country Albums (RPM)	19
US Billboard 200	56
US Top Country Albums (Billboard)	8
Chart (1999)	Position
US Billboard 200	8
US Top Country Albums (Billboard)	3
Chart (2000)	Position
Canadian Albums (Nielsen SoundScan)	191
US Billboard 200	68
US Top Country Albums (Billboard)	6
Chart (2001)	Position
Canadian Country Albums (Nielsen SoundScan)	21
Chart (2002)	Position
Canadian Country Albums (Nielsen SoundScan)	33

=== Decade-end charts ===
Chart (1990–1999)	Position
US Billboard 200	43

=== Singles ===
Year	Single	Peak chart positions		
Year	Single	US Country	US	CAN Country
1997	"I Can Love You Better"	7	77	3
1998	"There's Your Trouble"	1	36	3
1998	"Wide Open Spaces"	1	41	1
1999	"You Were Mine"	1	34	1
1999	"Tonight the Heartache's on Me"	6	46	4

=== Other charted songs ===
Year	Single	Peak positions
Year	Single	US Country
1999	"Let 'Er Rip"	64

== Certifications ==
Certifications for Wide Open Spaces
Region	Certification	Certified units/sales
Australia (ARIA)	3× Platinum	210,000^{‡}
Canada (Music Canada)	4× Platinum	400,000^{^}
New Zealand (RMNZ)	Gold	7,500^{‡}
United Kingdom (BPI)	Gold	100,000^{*}
United States (RIAA)	13× Platinum	13,000,000^{‡}
^{*} Sales figures based on certification alone.^{^} Shipments figures based on certification alone.^{‡} Sales+streaming figures based on certification alone.

== See also ==
- List of best-selling albums in the United States
