= Long Time Gone Tour =

2013–14 concert tour by Dixie Chicks

- Tour by Dixie Chicks
- Promotional poster for tour
- Location: Canada; Europe
- Start date: October 26, 2013
- End date: March 20, 2014
- Legs: 2
- No. of shows: 10 in North America; 5 in Europe; 15 Total

Dixie Chicks concert chronology
- Accidents & Accusations Tour (2006); Long Time Gone Tour (2013-14); DCX MMXVI World Tour (2016)

The Long Time Gone Tour was the fourth headlining tour by American country group, Dixie Chicks.

== Background ==
The group sparked numerous reunion rumors after they were booked to play several music festivals in Canada, for the summer of 2013. The girls performed at the Craven Country Jamboree, Cavendish Beach Music Festival and the RBC Royal Bank Bluesfest. The festival shows received rave reviews from music critics, prompting the group to launch a tour in the fall of 2013. Announced in August 2013, the tour initially showed ten shows in Canada. Bandmember Emily Robison stated the tour was a way to thank Canadian fans for the warm response. She further stated: "We had such a great time playing for our Canadian fans this summer that we've been inspired to come back for more". Many media outlets reported the outing as a reunion tour. Frontwoman Natalie Maines squashed rumors, saying the band never formally split.

== Opening acts ==
- Charlie Mars (Canada)

== Setlist ==
1. "I Can Love You Better"
2. "Wide Open Spaces"
3. "Am I the Only One (Who's Ever Felt This Way)"
4. "You Were Mine"
5. "Ready to Run"
6. "Goodbye Earl"
7. "Cowboy Take Me Away"
8. "Don't Waste Your Heart"
9. "Some Days You Gotta Dance"
10. "Sin Wagon"
11. "Long Time Gone"
12. "Landslide"
13. "Truth No. 2"
14. "Godspeed (Sweet Dreams)" / "Lullaby"
15. "Silent House"
16. "The Long Way Around"
17. "Easy Silence"
18. "I Like It"
19. "Lubbock or Leave It"

Encore

20. "Travelin’ Soldier"
21. "Not Ready To Make Nice"
22. "Mississippi"

== Tour dates ==
Date	City	Country	Venue
North America
October 26, 2013	Vancouver	Canada	Rogers Arena
October 27, 2013	Kelowna	Canada	Prospera Place
October 29, 2013	Dawson Creek	Canada	EnCana Events Centre
October 31, 2013	Calgary	Canada	Scotiabank Saddledome
November 1, 2013	Edmonton	Canada	Rexall Place
November 3, 2013	Saskatoon	Canada	Credit Union Centre
November 5, 2013	Winnipeg	Canada	MTS Centre
November 8, 2013	Oshawa	Canada	General Motors Centre
November 9, 2013	Hamilton	Canada	Copps Coliseum
November 10, 2013	London	Canada	Budweiser Gardens
Europe
March 14, 2014^{[A]}	Dublin	Ireland	The O_{2}
March 15, 2014^{[A]}	London	England	The O_{2} Arena
March 17, 2014	Stockholm	Sweden	SWCC Auditorium
March 18, 2014	Oslo	Norway	Oslo Spektrum
March 20, 2014	Copenhagen	Denmark	Falkoner Teatret

Festivals and other miscellaneous performances
^{A} These concerts are a part of "C2C: Country to Country"

=== Box office score data ===
Venue	City	Tickets sold / Available	Gross revenue
General Motors Centre	Oshawa	5,380 / 5,380 (100%)	$452,620
Budweiser Gardens	London	9,069 / 9,069 (100%)	$643,261

== Critical reception ==
The tour received great reviews with its initial shows in Canada. For the concert at the Scotiabank Saddledome, Gerry Krochak (Calgary Sun) gave the show four out of five stars. He wrote, "The love and respect that fans have for the Dixie Chicks has been well earned — every step of the non-traditional way. It’s been seven years since the group released anything new, but here’s hoping [...]". In Winnipeg, Elisha Dacey (Metro News) gave the show three and a half out of five stars. She says, "Mayor jokes aside, the show was a stripped-down and laid back retrospective of the Chicks’ past four albums. It took a while before Maine’s voice was truly warmed up and settled down, but she proved her distinctive country voice was more than the warm alto early fans may be used to". For the final show in London, James Reaney (The London Free Press) wrote the group slowed no signs of animosity despite their controversial downfall. He went on to say, "Sunday night was a chance to celebrate the past and the present with fans cheering from the band’s arrival all the way to a huge ovation after a 90-minute main set".
