= Josh Herbert =

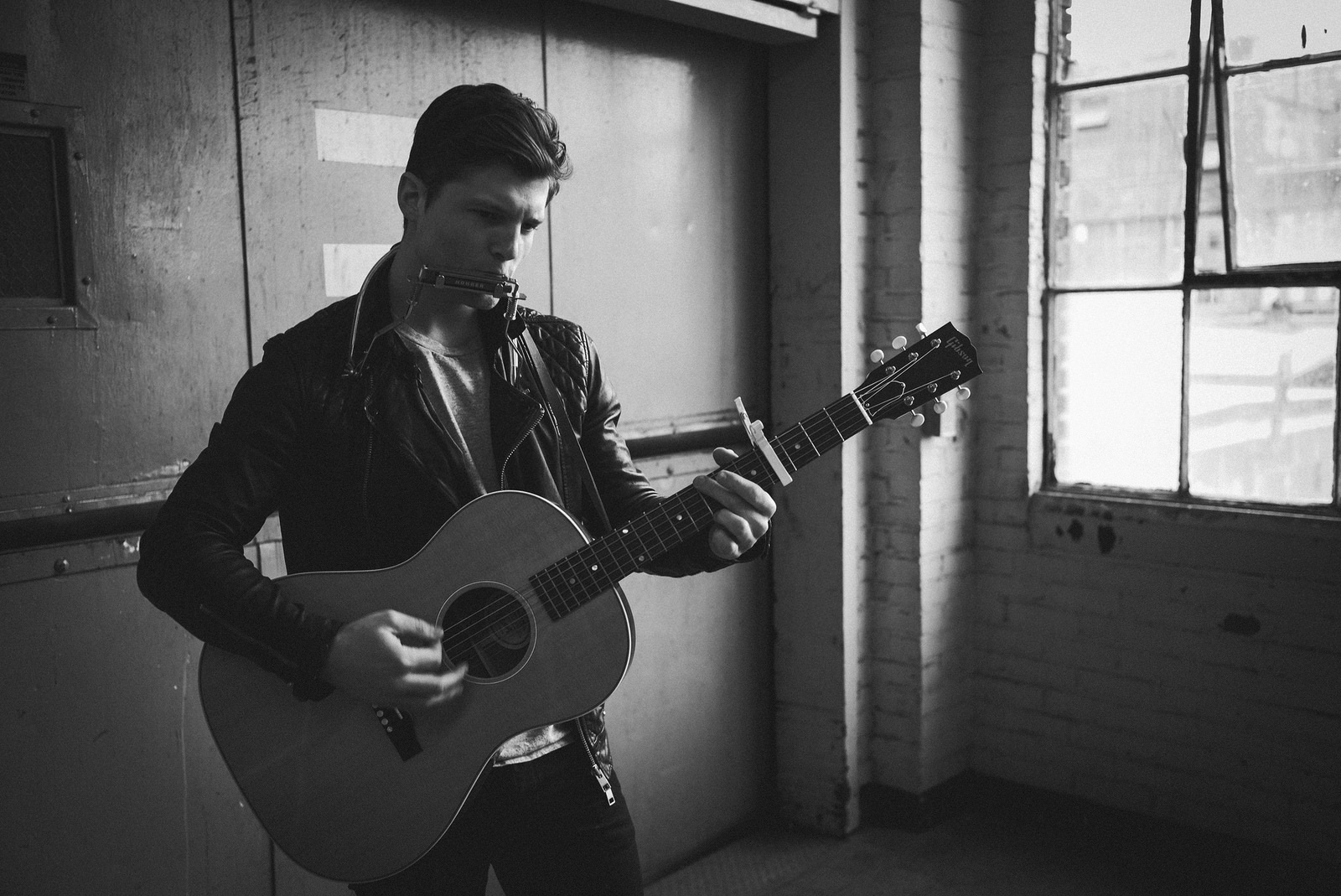

Background information
- Born: April 1, 1990 (age 34)
- Origin: Pittsburgh, Pennsylvania, U.S.
- Genres: Country; pop
- Instruments: Vocals; guitar; piano; drums; mandolin; banjo; harmonica; bass guitar
- Years active: 2015–present

Josh Herbert (born April 1, 1990) is an American musician, singer and songwriter from Pittsburgh, Pennsylvania.

== Background ==
Josh Herbert was born on April 1, 1990, in the United States. He is the cousin of Jake Herbert.

He began playing the guitar at the age of 10 and started recording his songs at the age of 12 with his first band Restraining Order (2002) and later with his junior high school band, Brunch Sounds Great (2005). In junior high school Herbert began posting cover songs to YouTube and grow his recognition as a musician.

Josh Herbert graduated from Slippery Rock University of Pennsylvania with a Bachelors in Arts.

In 2015 he was contacted by The Chicks and invited to perform as an opening act for their extended DCX MMXVI World Tour in North America.

Josh Herbert has also been involved in ice hockey, playing for the North Pittsburgh Wildcats (1994 to 2007), the North Allegheny (2004 to 2008: State Champions in 2007 and Game MVP scoring 4 goals), the Junior B Penguins (2008), and for Slippery Rock University club hockey (2008 to 2012).
