= The Dream (John & Audrey Wiggins album) =

Studio album by John & Audrey Wiggins
- Released: April 22, 1997
- Genre: Country
- Length: 40:05
- Label: Mercury Records 534286
- Producer: Dann Huff

John & Audrey Wiggins chronology
John & Audrey Wiggins (1994)	The Dream (1997)

The Dream is the second and final album by American country music duo John & Audrey Wiggins. It was released in 1997 via Mercury Records. The album includes the single "Somewhere in Love", which peaked at number 49 on Hot Country Songs.

== Critical reception ==
Country Standard Time reviewer John Johnson gave this album a mixed review, saying that it had mostly generic songwriting and production, but citing "I Can Sleep When I'm Dead" as a standout track. Allmusic critic Stephen Thomas Erlewine gave it three stars out of five, calling it a "little slicker" than the duo's first album, and that it was "enjoyable" but did not offer substantial songs. Geoffrey Himes of New Country gave it three stars out of five, calling the album's cover version of Poco's 1978 hit "Crazy Love" the best track on the album, and saying that the other strong songs were the ones that included shared lead vocals. The album's title track includes a 1962 recording of their father, Johnny Wiggins, singing "Honeymoon with the Blues". "Once You've Loved Somebody" was covered by the Dixie Chicks on their 1998 album, Wide Open Spaces.

== Track listing ==
1. "Somewhere in Love" (Kerry Kurt Phillips, Chuck Leonard) – 3:17
2. "Once You've Loved Somebody" (Thom McHugh, Bruce Miller) – 3:33
3. "I Can Sleep When I'm Dead" (Leslie Satcher, Max T. Barnes) – 3:47
4. "Little Bitty Pieces" (John Wiggins) – 3:35
5. "Crazy Love" (Rusty Young) – 3:09
6. "Were You Ever Really Mine" (Tim Mensy, Gary Harrison) – 3:01
7. "Be Still My Heart" (Gordon Kennedy, Randy Thomas) – 4:07
8. "Party Down" (Michael Garvin, Anthony L. Smith, P.R. Battle) – 3:30
9. "Going with My Heart" (Wiggins) – 3:43
10. "If a Train Left for Memphis" (George Teren, Don Pfrimmer, Tim Buppert) – 2:49
11. "The Dream" (Harley Allen, Clive Williams) – 5:34
  - features Johnny Wiggins performing "Honeymoon with the Blues" in 1962 with spoken intro by Ernest Tubb

== Personnel ==
- Bruce Bouton – steel guitar
- Mike Brignardello – bass guitar
- Joe Chemay – bass guitar, background vocals
- Stuart Duncan – fiddle
- Larry Franklin – fiddle
- Paul Franklin – steel guitar
- John Hobbs – piano, keyboards
- Dann Huff – acoustic guitar, electric guitar, 12-string guitar, gut string guitar, bouzouki
- Kim Keyes – background vocals
- Paul Leim – drums, percussion
- Terry McMillan –percussion
- Steve Nathan – keyboards
- Michael Omartian – piano, accordion
- Don Potter – acoustic guitar
- Matt Rollings – piano
- Joe Spivey – fiddle, mandolin
- Billy Joe Walker, Jr. – acoustic guitar
- Biff Watson – acoustic guitar
- Lonnie Wilson – drums
- Curtis Wright – background vocals
