= Wide Open Spaces (song) =

Single by Dixie Chicks

from the album Wide Open Spaces
- B-side: "I Can Love You Better"
- Released: August 17, 1998
- Recorded: 1997
- Genre: Country
- Length: 3:44
- Label: Monument
- Songwriter: Susan Gibson
- Producers: Blake Chancey, Paul Worley

Dixie Chicks singles chronology
| "There's Your Trouble" (1998) | "Wide Open Spaces" (1998) | "You Were Mine" (1998) |

"Wide Open Spaces" is a song written by Susan Gibson and recorded by the American country music group Dixie Chicks. It was released in August 1998 as the third single and title track from the band's album Wide Open Spaces. The song hit number one on the U.S. Country singles chart and spent four weeks there in November 1998. It also placed to number 41 on the U.S. Pop singles chart.

In 2001, the RIAA placed "Wide Open Spaces" at number 259 on its 365 Songs of the Century list. In 2003, CMT named it number 22 in its 100 Greatest Songs in Country Music list.

== History ==
Amarillo, Texas-based Susan Gibson wrote the song's first lyrics in 1993, on her first visit back home after leaving for forestry school at the University of Montana. She left the notebook containing the lyrics at home by mistake when she returned to school; her mother found it and included it in a care package, inspiring Gibson to complete a song along the themes of leaving home. She first performed it in local clubs around the University of Montana, where it was sometimes requested.

By the late 1990s, Gibson was lead singer of the alt country band The Groobees. They recorded an album, Wayside, that included "Wide Open Spaces" and which would be released in 1999. It was produced by Lloyd Maines, father of new Chicks lead singer Natalie Maines.

Cover of the published sheet music for the song

Lloyd Maines identified with the tale of a daughter leaving home, and thought it would match Natalie's vocal character well; he brought the song to the group, who tested it in concert a few times to a strong response. Both the Chicks and Sony Music agreed with Lloyd Maines' assessment, not only recording it but making it the title tune of the Maines-era group's first album as well.

The youthful, romantic, adventurous sense of independence featured in "Wide Open Spaces" helped key much of the group's new image; it thus became one of their signature songs and proved very popular among young teenage girls. The lyric speaks of possibilities yet undiscovered:

She needs wide open spaces,
Room to make her big mistakes
She needs new faces —
She knows the high stakes

The lyric has been considered an exemplar of the songwriting strategy in which lines are not repeated in either the verses or chorus. The Texas, bluegrass-flavored arrangement in the recording begins with a fiddle riff, with the band soon joining in. Verses are sung by Natalie Maines by herself, with drums, fiddle, and soft guitar and piano carrying the accompaniment. Choruses feature sisters Emily Strayer and Martie Seidel backing Maines with harmony vocals, and also add a banjo line. The instrumental break features Strayer and Seidel on mandolin and fiddle respectively. The main fiddle riff then brings the recording to a close.

Emily Strayer was proud that the group's hits such as this were still able to incorporate the banjo, an instrument the Nashville establishment often frowned upon as being too hillbilly. Susan Gibson and "Wide Open Spaces" has been considered an example of the influence of the West Texas influence in country music songwriting; Gibson herself considers Amarillo to be "where the wide open spaces are. Amarillo has the most beautiful sunsets." Gibson's childhood family drives from Amarillo to Missoula, Montana, also trace the song's lyric and settings.

The song gained Nashville respect, as it was named the Country Music Association Awards Single of the Year in 1999. It also won Gibson the American Songwriter Professional Country Songwriter of the Year award in early 2000, as well as a BMI award the previous year. Although the song itself was not nominated for a Grammy Award (the album was, as was its previous single, "There's Your Trouble", both of which won in their categories), it was included on the various artists 1999 Grammy Nominees compilation album.

== Music video ==
The music video for "Wide Open Spaces" portrayed the Chicks in a Rocky Mountains setting, cavorting through wide open fields of wildflowers and the like. Interspersed were scenes of the then-all blonde Chicks on tour: in performance, backstage, and on their tour bus (the last showing the slogan "Ain't Skeerd" on the outside). The performance was filmed at West Fest, an annual event in Winter Park, Colorado where the Chicks appeared four years running. The mountain scenes were done around Winter Park as well, and included background shots of some of the Chicks exercising their trampoline talents. It was directed by Thom Oliphant, who previously directed "There's Your Trouble," and would later co-direct "Without You."

This effort was directed by Thom Oliphant, and was named the Country Music Association Awards Music Video of the Year in 1999. It was placed at #32 on CMT's 2004 ranking of the 100 Greatest Videos.

== Charts ==
=== Weekly charts ===
| Chart (1998) | Peak position |
|---|---|
| Canada Country Singles (RPM) | 1 |
| US Billboard Hot 100 | 41 |
| US Hot Country Songs (Billboard) | 1 |

=== Year-end charts ===
| Chart (1998) | Position |
|---|---|
| Canada Country Tracks (RPM) | 16 |
| US Country Songs (Billboard) | 61 |

| Chart (1999) | Position |
|---|---|
| US Country Songs (Billboard) | 70 |

== Certifications ==
Certifications
| Region | Certification | Certified units/sales |
|---|---|---|
| Australia (ARIA) | Gold | 35,000^{‡} |
| New Zealand (RMNZ) | Gold | 15,000^{‡} |
| United States (RIAA) | 2× Platinum | 2,000,000^{‡} |
^{‡} Sales+streaming figures based on certification alone.

== Legacy ==
The commercial success of the single and album gave songwriter Gibson something of a windfall, which she celebrated by going to San Marcos, Texas and buying gifts for everyone she knew. She would later say the song was both innocent and personal for her, in the latter detailed so much that she was surprised another artist would relate to it. She would say of the song's recording by the Chicks that it was "beautiful [with] stunning musicianship and very professional production ... [a] gorgeous recording." And of the song's popularity, Gibson would say, "So much of the success of that song belongs to [the Chicks] ... but pairing that song with that group is what made 'Wide Open Spaces' what it is. It really was just a magical combination of right place, right time, right group. I'm glad it happened to me."

"Wide Open Spaces" has been a constant on the Chicks' concert tours, and indeed was the only song from Wide Open Spaces still in the set list as of the 2006 Accidents & Accusations Tour. The New York Times said that in one such 2006 performance, in light of the still-ongoing Chicks political controversy, "songs like 'Wide Open Spaces' ..., about women leaving home and striking out on their own, sounded more than ever like mission statements." It remained on the playlist during the DCX MMXVI World Tour. Gibson also continues to perform it at her live performance outings.

An introspective interpretation by the artist Soccer Mommy has gained some media attention. That singer said in 2018, "I'm a huge Dixie Chicks fan. I think 'Wide Open Spaces' is one of those perfect '90s alt-country songs. Plus it's relatable to any girl who's moved away from home and had to start a new life somewhere."
