= Tonight the Heartache's on Me =

Single by The Chicks

from the album Wide Open Spaces
- Released: April 12, 1999
- Recorded: 1997
- Genre: Country; honky tonk
- Length: 3:25
- Label: Monument
- Songwriters: Mary Francis; Johnny MacRae; Bob Morrison
- Producers: Paul Worley; Blake Chancey

The Chicks singles chronology
"You Were Mine" (1998)	"Tonight the Heartache's on Me" (1999)	"Ready to Run" (1999)

"Tonight the Heartache's on Me" is a song recorded by American country music group The Chicks. It was released in April 1999 as the fifth and final single from their album Wide Open Spaces. It was written by Mary Francis, Johnny MacRae and Bob Morrison. Joy Lynn White previously recorded the song on her 1994 album Wild Love.

== Chart performance ==
Chart (1999)	Peak position
Canada Country Singles (RPM)	4
US Billboard Hot 100	46
US Hot Country Songs (Billboard)	6

=== Year-end charts ===
Chart (1999)	Position
Canada Country Tracks (RPM)	32
US Country Songs (Billboard)	43
