= Thank Heavens for Dale Evans =

Studio album by Dixie Chicks
- Released: December 1990; February 7, 1994 (re-release)
- Recorded: Early 1990–November 1990
- Genre: Country
- Length: 39:03
- Label: Crystal Clear Sound
- Producer: Macy, Lynch, E. Erwin, and M. Erwin

Dixie Chicks chronology
Thank Heavens for Dale Evans (1990)	Little Ol' Cowgirl (1992)

Professional ratings
Review scores
Source	Rating
Allmusic	3/5 stars

Thank Heavens for Dale Evans is the debut studio album by American country music band the Dixie Chicks. The group's original membership of Robin Lynn Macy, Laura Lynch, Martie Erwin, and Emily Erwin (whose names were respectively changed to Martie Maguire and Emily Strayer upon marriage) would survive intact for only this album and the following Little Ol' Cowgirl, from 1989 to 1992, before first Macy, and then Lynch departed and Natalie Maines took over in 1995, creating the trio that became the highly successful band which found great fame in 1998 and remain popular with a large following to this day.

== Track listing ==
No.	Title	Writer(s)	Length
1.	"The Cowboy Lives Forever"	Lynnda Goza	2:57
2.	"I Want to Be a Cowboy's Sweetheart"	Patsy Montana	2:17
3.	"Thunderheads"	Lisa Brandenburg, Robin Lynn Macy	4:17
4.	"Long Roads"	John Kirk, Lorie Lichtenwalner	2:22
5.	"Who Will Be the Next One"	Angela Moore	1:57
6.	"Brilliancy"	Traditional	2:16
7.	"Thank Heavens for Dale Evans"	Martie Erwin, Macy, Brandenburg	2:54
8.	"This Heart of Mine"	Steven F. Brines, Jim Smoak	2:28
9.	"Storm Out on the Sea"	Mary Neal Northcut, Macy	3:26
10.	"West Texas Wind"	Jon Ims	3:53
11.	"Rider"	Traditional	2:53
12.	"Green River"	Donna Cary	3:16
13.	"Salty"	Kenny Baker	2:20
14.	"Bring It On Home to Me"	Sam Cooke	1:47
Total length:			39:03

== Personnel ==
=== Dixie Chicks ===
- Robin Lynn Macy - guitar, vocals, harmony
- Laura Lynch - bass, vocals, harmony
- Martie Erwin - fiddle, viola, harmony
- Emily Erwin - banjo, harmony

=== Additional personnel ===
- Dave Peters - mandolin
