= You Were Mine =

Single by Dixie Chicks

from the album Wide Open Spaces
- Released: December 7, 1998
- Recorded: August 1997
- Genre: Country
- Length: 3:37
- Label: Monument
- Songwriters: Emily Strayer, Martie Maguire
- Producers: Blake Chancey, Paul Worley

Dixie Chicks singles chronology
"Wide Open Spaces" (1998)	"You Were Mine" (1998)	"Tonight the Heartache's on Me" (1999)

Music video
- "You Were Mine" at CMT.com

"You Were Mine" is a song recorded by American country music group Dixie Chicks. Released in December 1998 as the fourth single from the album Wide Open Spaces, the song spent two weeks atop the U.S. Country singles chart in March 1999; that same month, it reached #34 on the Billboard Hot 100 and topped Canada's country music chart for a week.

== History ==
The song was written in 1995 by two of the founders of the original Dixie Chicks band, the Erwin sisters (now known as Martie Maguire and Emily Strayer), who were accustomed to writing music and performing. Strayer wrote most of the song, and Maguire supplied the bridge. It is a very autobiographical song, about the breakup of the sisters' parents and their subsequent divorce. In one interview, when asked about it, Emily said that their parents generally "sweep it under the rug", saying, "They know it's about them, but [whispers] we never talk about it. [laughs] They don't want to bring it up because they're still weird around each other. My dad doesn't want to think it's about him, because it doesn't make him look very good, and my mom thinks she's moved on."

"You Were Mine" played a key role in bringing the Dixie Chicks from near-total obscurity to massive commercial success. Based on a recommendation from session musician and producer Lloyd Maines, in the summer of 1995 the Erwin sisters invited Maines' daughter Natalie to return to her home in Lubbock, Texas to sing the lead vocal on a demo recording of the song, rather than using the Chicks' then-actual lead vocalist Laura Lynch to sing the part. At the time, the sisters told the other supporting musicians that this was only because Lynch was unavailable due to being out of town on a personal matter. In reality, the recording both convinced Natalie Maines that she would be comfortable singing a more pop and country rock-oriented format of country material (as opposed to their past purer bluegrass focus) and simultaneously confirmed both sisters' suspicions that Maines' powerful versatile voice could complement their instrumental prowess, leading them to replace Lynch with Maines.

When recording for the first-Maines-era album Wide Open Spaces began, "You Were Mine" was the only song the band was certain would be included. The recording has a solid country music sound. From the start, until the last strains of the song, Maguire's violin draws out a hushed, somewhat sorrowful tune. A dose of Lloyd Maines' steel guitar in the background – which also helped establish the record's traditional country categorization – and the mixture of Maines' vocals with the sisters' harmony set a tone of loss and regret.

"You Were Mine" was performed during the group's 2000 Fly Tour, where Rolling Stone called Maines' "powerhouse, nail-it-to-the-wall perfect delivery of [the] achingly beautiful weeper" one of the highlights of the show, but was not performed again until the Long Time Gone Tour in 2013.

== Music video ==
The music video for "You Were Mine", directed by Adolfo Doring, shows the Dixie Chicks checking into the Gramercy Park Hotel in New York. The sisters go up to their rooms looking tired and forlorn, but Maines circles around the revolving door and walks the neighboring Gramercy streets, singing the song. Occasional views of happier couples and families in the hotel are shown. At the end, Maguire is seen playing the song's final phrase on violin.

== Chart positions ==
"You Were Mine" debuted at number 69 on the U.S. Billboard Hot Country Singles & Tracks for the week of December 12, 1998.

Chart (1998–1999)	Peak position
Canada Country Singles (RPM)	1
US Billboard Hot 100	34
US Hot Country Songs (Billboard)	1

=== Year-end charts ===
Chart (1999)	Position
Canada Country Tracks (RPM)	15
US Country Songs (Billboard)	11

== Certifications ==
Certifications
Region	Certification	Certified units/sales
United States (RIAA)	Gold	500,000^{‡}
^{‡} Sales+streaming figures based on certification alone.
