= DCX MMXVI World Tour =

2016–17 concert tour by Dixie Chicks

- Tour by Dixie Chicks
- Tour poster
- Location: Europe, North America, Oceania
- Start date: April 16, 2016
- End date: April 18, 2017
- Legs: 4
- No. of shows: 13 in Europe; 61 in North America; 8 in Oceania; 82 Total

Dixie Chicks concert chronology
- Long Time Gone Tour (2013); DCX MMXVI-VII World Tour (2016–17); The Chicks Tour (2022–23)

The DCX MMXVI World Tour was the fifth headlining concert tour from American country music trio Dixie Chicks. It started on April 16, 2016, in Antwerp, Belgium and finished on April 18, 2017, in London, Ontario, Canada. The tour was the first time in ten years the band had toured the United States and Australia as a headlining act. It was the first time the band performed in New Zealand. For the shows in 2017, the tour was renamed the DCX MMXVII World Tour. This was the last tour where they were known as the Dixie Chicks.

The sound of the show is more guitar and rock and roll driven than earlier shows, with re-worked Dixie Chicks classics and several covers by Patty Griffin, Lana Del Rey, Beyoncé, and Bob Dylan. Through large video projections several political and empowering messages are spread.

== Background ==
In June 2015, the group announced that they would tour Europe in April 2016, additional dates were announced in August. North American dates were announced in November 2015. Due to demand additional North American dates were announced on May 2, 2016. The Oceania leg was announced in October 2016.

== Show synopsis ==
The stage is set up as a classic stage with a big bars-shaped light rail that is pulled up during the opening song, revealing a large video screen. The Dixie Chicks are supported by a big band with a strong rock and roll sound. After a warm-up song, the band starts with a strong guitar version of "The Long Way Around", following "Lubbock or Leave It" featuring a trucker and rock and roll themed video. After the first of several Patty Griffin covers, a slowed down version of "Easy Silence" is performed with slow landscape shots and on-screen lyrics. After "Favorite Year" and "Long Time Gone", an acoustic cover of "Video Games" by Lana Del Rey follows. "Goodbye Earl" is another renewed version into a more guitar driven sound. During "Goodbye Earl" a video on domestic violence is shown, including Chris Brown, the Fritzl case and Donald Trump. A video interlude shows the Dixie Chicks in a video game-themed car race, while the instrumental cover of "Ace of Spades" is heard.

The show is split with a bluegrass acoustic segment, starting with "Travelin' Soldier", played by only the three core members of the band. After "Don't Let Me Die in Florida" and "White Trash Wedding", the touring band is introduced. The acoustic segment is closed with an instrumental medley, including Beyoncé's "Single Ladies (Put a Ring on It)" and "Seven Nation Army" by the White Stripes.

"Ready to Run" is themed as an election year parody, with a montage of Hillary Clinton and Donald Trump, while confetti is blown over the audience. Two more covers are performed: Bob Dylan's "Mississippi" and their version of "Landslide" by Fleetwood Mac.

After "Silent House", "I Like It", "Cowboy Take Me Away" and "Wide Open Spaces" the show is concluded with "Sin Wagon". The encore starts with a dark version of "Not Ready to Make Nice" and a final encore is a positive and empowering message from Ben Harper's "Better Way", closed off by a drum segment.

== Opening acts ==
- Augustana
- The Heavy
- Anderson East
- Josh Herbert
- Elle King
- Smooth Hound Smith
- Vintage Trouble
- Avalanche City

== Recordings ==
At the second to last show in the U.S. on October 8, 2016, Natalie Maines announced: "As you can see we've chosen you guys and the forum to be the audience for our DVD". The Edmonton, Calgary, Los Angeles, Melbourne and Hamilton shows were included in a one-night cinema event DCX MMXVI Live that was shown in theatres on August 7, 2017, followed by a DVD/Blu-ray/CD release on September 1, 2017, from Columbia Records.

== Setlist ==
1. "The Long Way Around"
2. "Lubbock or Leave It"
3. "Truth #2" (Patty Griffin cover)
4. "Easy Silence"
5. "Everybody Knows" / "Favorite Year" / "Some Days You Gotta Dance"
6. "Long Time Gone"
7. "Video Games" (Lana Del Rey cover) / "Nothing Compares 2 U" (Prince cover)
8. "Top of the World"
9. "Goodbye Earl"
10. "Travelin' Soldier"
11. "Daddy Lessons" (Beyoncé cover)
12. "Don't Let Me Die in Florida" (Patty Griffin cover)
13. "White Trash Wedding"
14. "Ready to Run"
15. "Mississippi" (Bob Dylan cover)
16. "Landslide"
17. "Silent House"
18. "I Like It"
19. "Cowboy Take Me Away"
20. "Wide Open Spaces"
21. "Sin Wagon"

Encore

23. "Not Ready to Make Nice"
24. "Better Way" (Ben Harper cover)

Notes

- "Video Games" was replaced with "Nothing Compares 2 U" starting with the performance in Horsens.
- "Daddy Lessons" was performed in Manchester, Glasgow, Pittsburgh, Camden, Toronto, Hershey, Vancouver, Auburn, Irvine, Dallas, Houston, Tampa, St. Paul, West Valley City, Mountain View, Raleigh, New Orleans, Melbourne, Brisbane and Sydney.
- "Everybody Knows" replaced "Favorite Year" starting in Michigan. In turn, "Some Days You Gotta Dance" replaced it during the performances in Hershey, Toronto, Calgary, Raleigh, Los Angeles, Brisbane and Sydney
- "Silent House" and "I Like It" were not performed in Brisbane and Sydney.
- Something in the Air replaced "Nothing Compares 2 U", starting with the show in New Zealand.

== Tour dates ==
Date	City	Country	Venue	Opening acts	Attendance	Revenue
Europe
April 16, 2016	Antwerp	Belgium	Lotto Arena	Augustana	3,805 / 4,382	$223,464
April 17, 2016	Zürich	Switzerland	Hallenstadion	Augustana	9,500 / 9,500	$754,847
April 19, 2016	Amsterdam	Netherlands	Heineken Music Hall	Augustana	—	—
April 20, 2016	Amsterdam	Netherlands	Heineken Music Hall	Augustana	—	—
April 22, 2016	Horsens	Denmark	Forum Horsens	Augustana	—	—
April 24, 2016	Oslo	Norway	Oslo Spektrum	Augustana	—	—
April 25, 2016	Stockholm	Sweden	Hovet	Augustana	—	—
April 27, 2016	Malmö	Sweden	Malmö Arena	Augustana	—	—
April 29, 2016	Birmingham	England	Barclaycard Arena	Augustana	—	—
April 30, 2016	Manchester	England	Manchester Arena	Augustana	8,546 / 9,134	$606,008
May 1, 2016	London	England	The O_{2} Arena	Augustana	13,078 / 15,471	$898,090
May 3, 2016	Glasgow	Scotland	The SSE Hydro	Augustana	11,259 / 11,421	$563,845
May 4, 2016	Dublin	Ireland	3Arena	Augustana	—	
North America Leg 1
June 1, 2016	Cincinnati	United States	Riverbend Music Center	Augustana; Josh Herbert	19,877 / 19,877	$1,150,340
June 3, 2016	Cuyahoga Falls	United States	Blossom Music Center	Augustana; Josh Herbert	18,428 / 20,415	$1,045,808
June 4, 2016	Clarkston	United States	DTE Energy Music Theatre	Augustana; Josh Herbert	14,197 / 14,841	$952,409
June 5, 2016	Tinley Park	United States	Hollywood Casino Amphitheatre	Augustana; Josh Herbert	21,516 / 28,059	$1,372,366
June 8, 2016	Holmdel	United States	PNC Bank Arts Center	The Heavy; Josh Herbert	8,210 / 15,883	$511,197
June 10, 2016	Burgettstown	United States	First Niagara Pavilion	The Heavy; Josh Herbert	11,262 / 21,731	$514,181
June 11, 2016	Saratoga Springs	United States	Saratoga Performing Arts Center	The Heavy; Josh Herbert	15,943 / 24,599	$824,242
June 13, 2016	New York City	United States	Madison Square Garden	The Heavy; Josh Herbert	10,366 / 14,521	$1,387,319
June 14, 2016	Mansfield	United States	Xfinity Center	The Heavy; Josh Herbert	10,503 / 19,422	$753,200
June 16, 2016	Bangor	United States	Darling's Waterfront Pavilion	Anderson East; Josh Herbert	10,876 / 12,877	$706,634
June 17, 2016	Hartford	United States	Xfinity Theatre	Anderson East; Josh Herbert	10,291 / 23,089	$668,426
June 18, 2016	Camden	United States	BB&T Pavilion	Anderson East; Josh Herbert	9,573 / 23,429	$565,407
June 21, 2016	Toronto	Canada	Molson Canadian Amphitheatre	Anderson East; Josh Herbert	30,477 / 31,351	$2,022,400
June 22, 2016	Toronto	Canada	Molson Canadian Amphitheatre	Anderson East; Josh Herbert	30,477 / 31,351	$2,022,400
June 24, 2016	Hershey	United States	Hersheypark Stadium	Anderson East; Josh Herbert	12,157 / 16,532	$817,664
June 25, 2016	Bristow	United States	Jiffy Lube Live	Anderson East; Josh Herbert	17,742 / 21,297	$1,191,951
July 7, 2016	Vancouver	Canada	Rogers Arena	Anderson East; Josh Herbert	12,870 / 14,463	$1,030,490
July 8, 2016	Auburn	United States	White River Amphitheatre	Anderson East; Josh Herbert	13,758 / 15,432	$927,073
July 9, 2016	Ridgefield	United States	Sunlight Supply Amphitheater	Anderson East; Josh Herbert	15,342 / 17,160	$1,057,715
July 12, 2016	Mountain View	United States	Shoreline Amphitheatre	Anderson East; Josh Herbert	17,832 / 21,142	$979,925
July 13, 2016	Wheatland	United States	Toyota Amphitheatre	Anderson East; Josh Herbert	14,783 / 17,271	$736,778
July 15, 2016	Chula Vista	United States	Sleep Train Amphitheatre	AugustanaL; Smooth Hound Smith	12,816 / 18,841	$797,272
July 16, 2016	Las Vegas	United States	T-Mobile Arena	AugustanaL; Smooth Hound Smith	9,319 / 11,059	$970,166
July 17, 2016	Phoenix	United States	Ak-Chin Pavilion	AugustanaL; Smooth Hound Smith	13,480 / 19,102	$682,771
July 20, 2016	Irvine	United States	Irvine Meadows Amphitheatre	AugustanaL; Smooth Hound Smith	12,402 / 13,844	$992,657
August 5, 2016	Dallas	United States	Gexa Energy Pavilion	Vintage Trouble; Smooth Hound Smith	19,701 / 19,701	$1,367,443
August 6, 2016	The Woodlands	United States	Cynthia Woods Mitchell Pavilion	Vintage Trouble; Smooth Hound Smith	15,626 / 15,626	$1,082,571
August 7, 2016	Austin	United States	Austin360 Amphitheatre	Vintage Trouble; Smooth Hound Smith	12,277 / 12,277	$975,008
August 10, 2016	Virginia Beach	United States	Veterans United Home Loans Amphitheater	Vintage Trouble; Smooth Hound Smith	10,443 / 17,804	$550,568
August 12, 2016	Raleigh	United States	Coastal Credit Union Music Park	Vintage Trouble; Smooth Hound Smith	17,785 / 19,408	$897,444
August 13, 2016	Charlotte	United States	PNC Music Pavilion	Vintage Trouble; Smooth Hound Smith	18,010 / 18,184	$1,178,026
August 14, 2016	Alpharetta	United States	Verizon Wireless Amphitheatre	Vintage Trouble; Smooth Hound Smith	12,229 / 12,229	$760,235
August 17, 2016	Nashville	United States	Bridgestone Arena	Vintage Trouble; Smooth Hound Smith	16,325 / 16,325	$1,517,305
August 19, 2016	Tampa	United States	MidFlorida Credit Union Amphitheatre	Vintage Trouble; Smooth Hound Smith	15,588 / 18,629	$897,334
August 20, 2016	West Palm Beach	United States	Perfect Vodka Amphitheatre	Vintage Trouble; Smooth Hound Smith	10,405 / 18,186	$555,878
August 24, 2016	Maryland Heights	United States	Hollywood Casino Amphitheatre	Vintage Trouble; Smooth Hound Smith	17,897 / 19,521	$911,283
August 25, 2016	Noblesville	United States	Klipsch Music Center	Vintage Trouble; Smooth Hound Smith	16,909 / 23,252	$852,771
August 27, 2016 (Note: The August 27 and 28, 2016, concerts in Falcon Heights are part of the Minnesota State Fair.)	Falcon Heights	United States	Minnesota State Fair Grandstand	Vintage Trouble; Smooth Hound Smith	—	
August 28, 2016	Falcon Heights	United States	Minnesota State Fair Grandstand	Vintage Trouble; Smooth Hound Smith		
August 30, 2016	Kansas City	United States	Sprint Center	Vintage Trouble; Smooth Hound Smith	13,520 / 13,520	$1,138,510
September 1, 2016	Greenwood Village	United States	Fiddler's Green Amphitheatre	Vintage Trouble; Smooth Hound Smith	—	
September 2, 2016	West Valley City	United States	USANA Amphitheatre	Vintage Trouble; Smooth Hound Smith	18,483 / 19,011	$898,560
September 8, 2016	Tulsa	United States	BOK Center	Elle King	8,063 / 9,337	$766,268
September 9, 2016	North Little Rock	United States	Verizon Arena	Elle King	8,809 / 14,259	$691,159
September 10, 2016	New Orleans	United States	Smoothie King Center	Elle King	9,529 / 10,041	$812,884
September 15, 2016	Moline	United States	iWireless Center	Elle King	6,783 / 9,668	$500,689
September 16, 2016	Columbus	United States	Nationwide Arena	Elle King	9,430 / 13,651	$828,362
September 17, 2016	Buffalo	United States	First Niagara Center	Elle King	7,621 / 10,545	$592,808
September 22, 2016	Louisville	United States	KFC Yum! Center	Elle King	9,821 / 10,780	$862,342
September 23, 2016	Toledo	United States	Huntington Center	Augustana	4,778 / 5,614	$424,653
September 24, 2016	Green Bay	United States	Resch Center	Augustana	6,464 / 6,917	$620,056
September 29, 2016	Edmonton	Canada	Rogers Place	Elle King	12,152 / 12,152	$1,018,230
September 30, 2016	Saskatoon	Canada	SaskTel Centre	Elle King	9,841 / 10,713	$800,788
October 1, 2016	Calgary	Canada	Scotiabank Saddledome	Elle King	11,194 / 11,194	$933,512
October 7, 2016	Oakland	United States	Oracle Arena	Elle King	7,228 / 10,560	$561,848
October 8, 2016	Inglewood	United States	The Forum	Elle King	5,766 / 6,134	$572,898
October 10, 2016	Los Angeles	United States	Hollywood Bowl	Elle King	16,048 / 16,048	$1,345,158
Oceania
March 25, 2017	Brisbane	Australia	Brisbane Entertainment Centre	Avalanche City	9,252 / 9,686	$1,073,410
March 26, 2017 (Note: The March 26, 2017, concert in Willowbank is part of CMC Rocks.)	Ipswich	Australia	Willowbank Raceway	Avalanche City	—	
March 29, 2017	Sydney	Australia	Qudos Bank Arena	Avalanche City	12,383 / 12,508	$1,243,770
March 30, 2017	Sydney	Australia	ICC Sydney Theatre	Avalanche City	6,702 / 7,919	$729,867
April 1, 2017	Melbourne	Australia	Rod Laver Arena	Avalanche City	21,304 / 21,650	$2,487,280
April 2, 2017	Melbourne	Australia	Rod Laver Arena	Avalanche City	21,304 / 21,650	$2,487,280
April 5, 2017	Perth	Australia	Perth Arena	Avalanche City	—	—
April 8, 2017	Napier	New Zealand	Mission Estate Winery	Avalanche City	—	—
North America Leg 2
April 14, 2017	Ottawa	Canada	Canadian Tire Centre	Smooth Hound Smith	—	—
April 15, 2017	Montreal	Canada	Bell Centre	Smooth Hound Smith	—	—
April 17, 2017	Hamilton	Canada	FirstOntario Centre	Smooth Hound Smith	—	—
April 18, 2017	London	Canada	Budweiser Gardens	Smooth Hound Smith	—	—
Total					788,574 / 959,194	$56,153,563

== Critical reception ==
Anastasia Verleysen of the Het Nieuwsblad says, "The Dixie Chicks are not just singing some country, but ladies with balls on their backs and even a high rock 'n roll content. And yet, their songs always go back to basics with the nonchalant banjo-strumming Emily Robinson, Martie Maguire handsome violin lines and the impressive voice of Natalie Maines." The Daily Telegraph's Sarah Carson stated, "the triumphant trio proved the power lies in their musicianship, not notoriety, and their talents remain as rich and fierce as ever." Erik Leijon for Montreal Gazette wrote about the 2017 leg of the tour: "Saturday night's set was a reminder that beyond having the courage to speak openly, the Dixie Chicks possess the heart-stopping harmonies, bluegrass stompers, superstar presence and enviable pop instincts to back up any words."
