= Susan Gibson =

American singer and songwriter

Susan Gibson is an American singer and songwriter who has released six solo albums and tours the nation. She was born in Fridley, Minnesota, and is based in Wimberley, Texas, as of 2011. Gibson was the lead singer for the alternative country band The Groobees and is the writer of The Chicks' hit "Wide Open Spaces".

== Discography ==
Album	Year	Label
Chin Up	2003	Orchard
Outerspace	2005	For The Records
New Dog, Old Tricks	2008	Smith Entertainment
Tight Rope	2011	ForTheRecords
Remember Who You Are	2016	ForTheRecords
The Hard Stuff	2019	ForTheRecords
