= There's Your Trouble =

Single by Dixie Chicks

from the album Wide Open Spaces
- B-side: "Give It Up or Let Me Go"
- Released: March 30, 1998
- Genre: Country
- Length: 3:10
- Label: Monument
- Songwriters: Mark Selby; Tia Sillers
- Producers: Blake Chancey; Paul Worley

Dixie Chicks singles chronology
"I Can Love You Better" (1997)	"There's Your Trouble" (1998)	"Wide Open Spaces" (1998)

"There's Your Trouble" is a song written by Mark Selby and Tia Sillers and recorded by American country music band Dixie Chicks (now known as the Chicks). It was released in March 1998 as the second single from the band's fourth studio album, Wide Open Spaces (1998), and peaked at No. 1 on the US Billboard Hot Country Singles & Tracks chart. The following year, the song was released in the United Kingdom and became the band's highest-charting single there when it peaked at No. 26.

== Reception ==
The song became the band's first No. 1 single on the Billboard magazine Hot Country Singles & Tracks chart in August 1998. In doing so, it became the first chart-topping song on Sony's newly resurrected Monument Records label since February 1978, when Larry Gatlin & The Gatlin Brothers Band reached the top with "I Just Wish You Were Someone I Love." In 1999, the Dixie Chicks were awarded a Grammy Award for Best Country Performance by a Duo or Group with Vocal for their performance of "There's Your Trouble".

== Live performances ==
The Dixie Chicks performed the song on Austin City Limits with Emily Robison's husband, country musician Charlie Robison in the midst of the band in 1999. The song was the first in their setlist that evening. A video was made of "There's Your Trouble," and it has aired on The Nashville Network, CMT, and GAC.

== Track listings ==
US CD and cassette single

1. "There's Your Trouble" – 3:10
2. "Give It Up or Let Me Go" – 4:55

UK CD1

1. "There's Your Trouble" – 3:10
2. "Stand by Your Man" – 3:21
3. "There's Your Trouble" (Jay Joyce extended remix) – 5:56

UK CD2

1. "There's Your Trouble" – 3:10
2. "Am I the Only One (Who's Ever Felt This Way)" – 3:25
3. "There's Your Trouble" (Jay Joyce full length country remix) – 3:58

UK cassette single

1. "There's Your Trouble" – 3:10
2. "Am I the Only One (Who's Ever Felt This Way)" – 3:25

European CD single

1. "There's Your Trouble" – 3:10
2. "Stand by Your Man" – 3:21

== Charts ==
=== Weekly charts ===
Chart (1998–1999)	Peak position
Canada Country Singles (RPM)	3
Europe (Eurochart Hot 100)	99
Scottish Singles Sales (Official Charts)	24
UK Singles (Official Charts)	26
US Billboard Hot 100	36
US Hot Country Songs (Billboard)	1

=== Year-end charts ===
Chart (1998)	Position
Canada Country Tracks (RPM)	6
US Hot Country Singles & Tracks (Billboard)	5

== Certifications ==
Certifications
Region	Certification	Certified units/sales
United States (RIAA)	Gold	500,000^{‡}
^{‡} Sales+streaming figures based on certification alone.

== Release history ==
Region	Date	Format(s)	Label(s)	Ref.
United States	March 30, 1998	Country radio	Monument	
United Kingdom	June 21, 1999	CD; cassette	Epic	
