= Shouldn't a Told You That =

1993 studio album by the Dixie Chicks

Studio album by the Dixie Chicks Cowgirl Band
- Released: November 2, 1993
- Genre: Country
- Length: 33:54
- Label: Crystal Clear Sound
- Producer: Steve Fishell

Dixie Chicks chronology
Little Ol' Cowgirl (1992)	Shouldn't a Told You That (1993)	Wide Open Spaces (1998)

Professional ratings
Review scores
Source	Rating
Allmusic	link

Shouldn't a Told You That is the third studio album by American country band Dixie Chicks, under the name the Dixie Chicks Cowgirl Band, released in 1993. It was their third and final album for the Crystal Clear Sound label, and last to feature singer-bassist Laura Lynch. Four years later, Natalie Maines joined, and the group released their 1998 breakthrough album Wide Open Spaces.

The title track, "Shouldn't a Told You That", was written by Walter Hyatt of the Austin cult band, Uncle Walt's Band. The track "There Goes My Dream" was previously recorded by Mark Collie for his album Born & Raised in Black & White in 1991.

== Track listing ==
1. "Whistles and Bells" (Cindy Bullens, Radney Foster) - 3:01
2. "I'm Falling Again" (Matthew Benjamin, Martie Erwin, Laura Lynch, Emily Erwin) - 3:25
3. "Shouldn't a Told You That" (Walter Hyatt) - 3:05
4. "Desire" (Steve Kolander, Kim Richey) - 3:30
5. "There Goes My Dream" (Jamie O'Hara) - 3:32
6. "One Heart Away" (Benjamin, Tom Van Schaik) - 3:35
7. "The Thrill Is in the Chase" (Lynch, Dave Peters) - 3:09
8. "I Wasn't Looking for You" (Benjamin) - 3:28
9. "I've Only Got Myself to Blame" (Tony Lane) - 3:22
10. "Planet of Love" (Jim Lauderdale, John Leventhal) - 5:00
  - Includes hidden track, "Boo Hoo"

== Personnel ==
- Martie Erwin - fiddle, vocals, harmony vocals
- Laura Lynch - bass, vocals, harmony vocals
- Emily Erwin - banjo, bass, Dobro, guitar, harmony vocals

Additional personnel

- Matthew Benjamin - acoustic guitar, electric guitar
- Joan Besen - piano
- Steve Fishell - Dobro, electric guitar
- Bob Gentry - bass
- Lloyd Maines - steel guitar
- Harry Stinson - harmony vocals
- Tom Van Schaik - percussion, drums

== Production ==
- Producer: Steve Fishell
- Engineer: Mike Poole
