= John & Audrey Wiggins (album) =

Studio album by John & Audrey Wiggins
- Released: June 21, 1994
- Genre: Country
- Length: 34:23
- Label: Mercury 518853
- Producer: Jim Cotton, Joe Scaife

John & Audrey Wiggins chronology
| John & Audrey Wiggins (1994) | The Dream (1997) |

John & Audrey Wiggins is the self-titled debut studio album by American country music duo John & Audrey Wiggins. It was released on June 21, 1994 via Mercury Records. Although the album did not chart, its single "Has Anybody Seen Amy" reached No. 22 on the Billboard Hot Country Songs chart.

== Critical reception ==
Bob Cannon of New Country magazine gave the debut album two-and-a-half stars out of five, saying that both siblings had strong voices that "[set] off sparks" on the songs with shared lead vocals, but that the rest of the songs were "solo numbers in country pop arrangements". Neil Pond of Country America was more favorable, saying that the album was "ever more versatile" because of the alternating male and female vocals.

== Track listing ==
| No. | Title | Writer(s) | Length |
|---|---|---|---|
| 1. | "Falling Out of Love" | John Wayne Wiggins | 2:55 |
| 2. | "She's in the Bedroom Crying" | Chuck Cannon, Jimmy Alan Stewart | 3:18 |
| 3. | "Has Anybody Seen Amy" | Don Henry, Jon Vezner | 3:18 |
| 4. | "Memory Making Night" | Wiggins | 3:46 |
| 5. | "Their Hearts Are Dancing" | Tony Haselden | 4:23 |
| 6. | "If She" | Don Von Tress | 3:28 |
| 7. | "If You Had a Heart" | Wiggins, Bobby Carmichael | 2:38 |
| 8. | "New Mexico" | Wiggins, Michael Garvin, Anthony L. Smith | 3:27 |
| 9. | "String of Bad Love" | Stan Munsey, Jim Sandefur | 2:39 |
| 10. | "Could You Walk a Mile" | J.B. Rudd, Stewart | 4:31 |

== Personnel ==
- Eddie Bayers – drums
- David Briggs – piano
- Clyde Carr – backing vocals
- Costo Davis – keyboards
- Dan Dugmore – pedal steel and resonator guitars
- Paul Franklin – pedal steel and resonator guitars
- Sonny Garrish – pedal steel guitar
- Rob Hajacos – fiddle
- Tony Haselden – electric guitar
- Keith Hinton – electric guitar
- Mike Lawler – keyboards
- Gary Lunn – bass guitar
- Randy McCormick – keyboards
- Don Potter – acoustic guitar
- Matt Rollings – piano
- Brent Rowan – acoustic guitar
- Joe Scaife – backing vocals
- Billy Joe Walker, Jr. – acoustic guitar
- Biff Watson – acoustic guitar
- John Willis – electric guitar
- Lonnie Wilson – drums
- Reggie Young – electric guitar
