= Little Ol' Cowgirl =

Studio album by Dixie Chicks
- Released: May 1, 1992; March 1, 1994 (re-release)
- Recorded: 1991
- Genre: Country
- Length: 45:12
- Label: Crystal Clear Sound
- Producers: Dixie Chicks, Larry Seyer

Dixie Chicks chronology
| Thank Heavens for Dale Evans (1990) | Little Ol' Cowgirl (1992) | Shouldn't a Told You That (1993) |

Professional ratings
Review scores
| Source | Rating |
|---|---|
| Allmusic | 3/5 stars |

Little Ol' Cowgirl is the second studio album by American country band Dixie Chicks, released in 1992. As with their previous album, it produced no chart singles. It was also the last album to feature Robin Lynn Macy, who left in late 1992 over a dispute with the Erwin sisters over the musical direction of the band.

The song "Past the Point of Rescue" was also recorded by Hal Ketchum on his 1991 album Past the Point of Rescue, from which it was released as a single in 1992.

== Track listing ==
1. "Little Ol' Cowgirl" (Jon Ims) – 2:53
2. "A Road Is Just a Road" (Mary Chapin Carpenter, John Jennings) – 3:15
3. "She'll Find Better Things to Do" (Bob Millard) –- 3:00
4. "Irish Medley" (traditional) – 3:57
5. "You Send Me" (Sam Cooke) – 2:51
6. "Just a Bit Like Me" (Robin Macy) – 3:56
7. "A Heart That Can" (Patti Dixon) – 2:35
8. "Past the Point of Rescue" (Mick Hanly) – 3:30
9. "Beatin' Around the Bush" (Matthew Benjamin, Martie Erwin) (Instrumental) – 2:32
10. "Two of a Kind" (Jon Ims) – 4:12
11. "Standin' by the Bedside" (Ira Tucker) – 2:29
12. "Aunt Mattie's Quilt" (Lisa Brandenburg, Macy) – 3:57
13. "Hallelujah, I Love Him So" (Ray Charles) – 2:41
14. "Pink Toenails" (Erwin, Laura Lynch) – 3:24

== Personnel ==
- Martie Erwin – fiddle, harmony vocals
- Laura Lynch – bass, vocals, harmony vocals
- Robin Lynn Macy – guitar, vocals, harmony vocals
- Emily Erwin – banjo, harmony vocals

=== Additional personnel ===
- Matthew Benjamin – guitar
- Jonathan David Brown – bagpipes
- Jeff Helmer – piano
- Lloyd Maines – steel guitar
- Larry Seyer – rhythm guitar
- Larry Spencer – trumpet
- Tom Van Schaik – percussion, drums
- Kirkland Bonik - the little cowgirl

=== Production ===
- Producers: Dixie Chicks, Larry Seyer
- Engineer: Larry Seyer
- Arranger: Larry Seyer
