= John & Audrey Wiggins =

American country music duo

- John (right) and Audrey Wiggins. Photo by Señor McGuire.

Background information
- Origin: Nashville, Tennessee, U.S.
- Genres: Country
- Years active: 1994–1997
- Labels: Mercury
- Past members: Audrey Wiggins; John Wiggins

John & Audrey Wiggins was an American country music duo formerly signed to Mercury Records. The duo consisted of John Wiggins and his sister Audrey, both of whom alternated as lead vocalists. They recorded two studio albums for PolyGram/Mercury Records between 1994 and 1997, in addition to charting four singles on the Billboard Hot Country Songs charts. John has since become a Nashville songwriter, with cuts by Joe Nichols, Blake Shelton, Randy Houser, and others.

== Biography ==
John Wayne Wiggins was born on October 13, 1962, in Nashville, Tennessee, and his sister, Audrey Lynn Wiggins was born December 26, 1967, in Asheville, North Carolina. They had been singers since childhood, and their father, Johnny Wiggins, was the "Singing Bus Driver" on Ernest Tubb's 1960s tours. John made his singing debut at age four, and for the next several years, they performed in their father's band. In the 1980s, the Wiggins siblings and Clinton Gregory joined the house band at a North Carolina venue called The Stompin' Ground.

They signed to Universal Music Group Nashville/Mercury Records in 1994, shortly before their father died. Working with producers Jim Cotton and Joe Scaife, they released their self-titled debut that year. The album produced three chart entries on the U.S. Billboard Hot Country Songs charts, including the No. 22 "Has Anybody Seen Amy". In 1995, 1996, and 1997, John & Audrey Wiggins received Country Music Association nominations for Duo of the Year. A second album, The Dream, followed in 1997 under the production of Dann Huff. and the only charting release from it was "Somewhere in Love" which peaked at No. 49 on the country charts.

In the 2000s, John found work as a songwriter in Nashville, Tennessee. Among his cuts were the singles "Tequila Makes Her Clothes Fall Off" by Joe Nichols; "Anything Goes" by Randy Houser; and "Who Are You When I'm Not Looking" by Nichols and by Blake Shelton.

== Discography ==
=== Albums ===
| Title | Album details |
|---|---|
| John & Audrey Wiggins | Release date: June 21, 1994; Label: Mercury Records; Format: CD, cassette |
| The Dream | Release date: April 22, 1997; Label: Mercury Records; Format: CD, cassette |

=== Singles ===
| Year | Single | Peak chart positions | | Album |
| Year | Single | US Country | CAN Country | Album |
|---|---|---|---|---|
| 1994 | "Falling Out of Love" | 47 | — | John & Audrey Wiggins |
| 1994 | "Has Anybody Seen Amy" | 22 | 34 | John & Audrey Wiggins |
| 1994 | "She's in the Bedroom Crying" | 58 | 68 | John & Audrey Wiggins |
| 1995 | "Memory Making Night" | — | 84 | John & Audrey Wiggins |
| 1997 | "Somewhere in Love" | 49 | 51 | The Dream |
| 1997 | "Crazy Love" | — | — | The Dream |
"—" denotes releases that did not chart

=== Music videos ===
| Year | Video | Director |
|---|---|---|
| 1994 | "Falling Out of Love" | Thom Oliphant |
| 1994 | "Has Anybody Seen Amy" | Martin Kahan |
| 1994 | "She's in the Bedroom Crying" | Martin Kahan |
| 1997 | "Somewhere in Love" | Deaton-Flanigen Productions |
| 1997 | "Crazy Love" | Thom Oliphant |
