= I Can Love You Better =

- US promotional cover

Single by Dixie Chicks

from the album Wide Open Spaces
- B-side: "Give It Up or Let Me Go"
- Released: October 27, 1997
- Recorded: 1997
- Genre: Country
- Length: 3:07 (radio edit); 3:53 (album version)
- Label: Monument
- Songwriters: Pamela Brown Hayes, Kostas
- Producers: Paul Worley, Blake Chancey

Dixie Chicks singles chronology
"I Can Love You Better" (1997)	"There's Your Trouble" (1998)

Music video
- "I Can Love You Better" at CMT.com

"I Can Love You Better" is a song written by Pamela Brown Hayes and Kostas and recorded by American country music group Dixie Chicks. It was the first single released by the group to feature Natalie Maines following their former lead vocalist Laura Lynch's departure from the group in 1995. The song premiered to country radio on October 27, 1997, as the group's debut single and opening track from their fourth studio album and major label debut Wide Open Spaces (1998).

Representing the group's first success, the song peaked at number seven on the Billboard Hot Country Songs chart and was a minor hit on the Billboard Hot 100, peaking at number 77. The group performed the song on two of their tours, the 2000 Fly Tour and the 2013 Long Time Gone Tour. The Dixie Chicks also performed a parody of the song, "No Letter Better Than B", on Sesame Street.

== Content ==
The song's narrator is assuring a man that she can love him better and make him forget his previous love.

== Critical reception ==
Stephen Thomas Erlewine cited the track as "convincing" in his review of the album for Allmusic.

== Music video ==
The music video for "I Can Love You Better" was directed by Chris Rogers. In it, the Dixie Chicks are shown performing the song while in an airport lobby. They are also shown sitting on an airport baggage claim belt, in a bakery, and on a crowded sidewalk.

== Chart performance ==
Chart (1997–1998)	Peak position
Canada Country Singles (RPM)	3
US Billboard Hot 100	77
US Hot Country Songs (Billboard)	7

=== Year-end charts ===
Chart (1998)	Position
Canada Country Tracks (RPM)	77
US Country Songs (Billboard)	57
