= The Chicks =

American country band

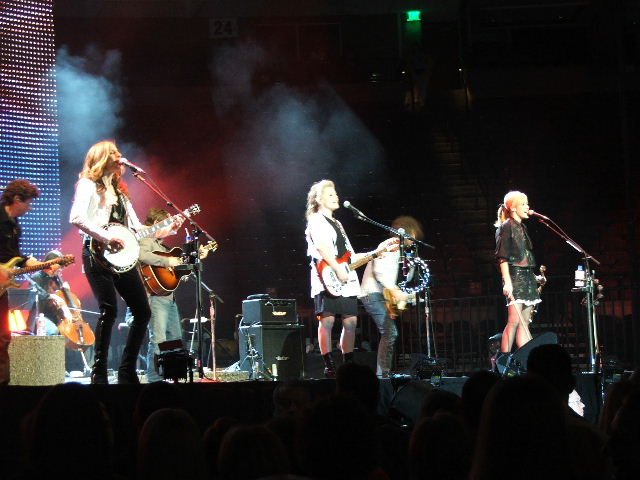
- The Chicks in 2006 (L-R: Emily Strayer, Natalie Maines, and Martie Maguire)

Background information
- Also known as: Dixie Chicks
- Origin: Dallas, Texas, U.S.
- Genres: Country; pop
- Years active: 1989–present
- Labels: Crystal Clear Sound; Monument Nashville; Columbia Nashville
- Spinoffs: Court Yard Hounds
- Members: Emily Strayer; Martie Maguire; Natalie Maines
- Past members: Robin Lynn Macy; Laura Lynch
- Website: thechicks.com

The Chicks, formerly the Dixie Chicks, are an American country music band from Dallas, Texas. The band consists of Natalie Maines (lead vocals, guitar, bass guitar) and sisters Martie Maguire (vocals, fiddle, mandolin, guitar) and Emily Strayer (vocals, guitar, banjo, Dobro).

Martie and Emily (both née Erwin) founded the Dixie Chicks in 1989 with bassist Laura Lynch and singer and guitarist Robin Lynn Macy. They performed bluegrass and country music, busking and touring the bluegrass festival circuits and small venues for six years. In 1992, Macy left the group with Lynch taking over vocals. After independently releasing three albums, in 1995, the Dixie Chicks were signed by Monument Records Nashville and Natalie Maines replaced Lynch. They released their first album with Monument, Wide Open Spaces, in 1998, followed by Fly in 1999. Both albums were certified diamond.

In 2003, while on stage in London, the Dixie Chicks publicly criticized the US president George W. Bush and the imminent Iraq War, triggering a backlash and damaging sales of their 2002 album Home. They released Taking the Long Way in 2006 and entered hiatus in 2008; Martie and Emily recorded as a duo, Court Yard Hounds. The Dixie Chicks reunited in 2016 for a series of tours. In 2020, they removed "Dixie" from their name due to negative connotations, and released their first album in 14 years, Gaslighter.

The Chicks have charted 22 times on the American Billboard Hot Country Songs charts; "There's Your Trouble", "Wide Open Spaces", "You Were Mine", "Cowboy Take Me Away", "Without You", and "Travelin' Soldier" all reached number one. The Chicks have received 13 Grammy Awards, ten Country Music Association awards and eight Academy of Country Music awards. By July 2020, with 33 million certified albums sold and sales of 27.9 million albums in the US, the Chicks had become the best-selling all-woman band and best-selling country group since Nielsen SoundScan began recording sales in 1991.

== History ==
=== 1989–1995: Original bluegrass group ===
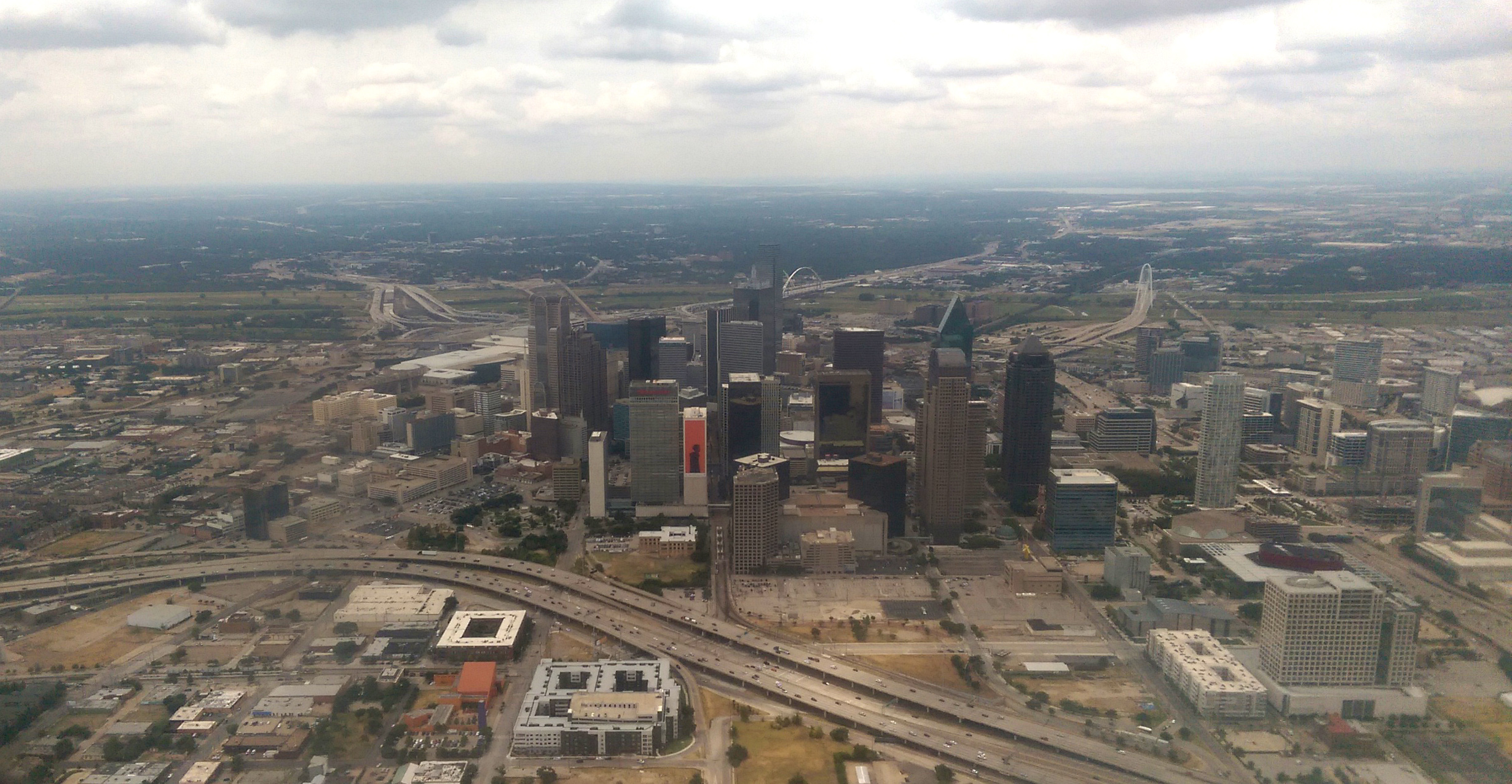
The Chicks formed as the Dixie Chicks in Dallas, Texas (seen here in 2016).

The Chicks were founded as the Dixie Chicks in 1989 in Dallas, Texas, an area with country music roots. The original lineup consisted of El Paso native Laura Lynch on upright bass, Californian Robin Lynn Macy on guitar, and the multi-instrumentalist sisters Martie and Emily Erwin, respectively born in Pennsylvania and Massachusetts and raised in Addison, Texas. The Erwin sisters, who were later married and both changed their names twice (Martie to Martie Seidel, then Martie Maguire; Emily to Emily Robison, then Emily Strayer), previously performed as members of the bluegrass group Blue Night Express along with country singer Sharon Gilchrist and her brother Troy. The band name was taken from the album Dixie Chicken by Lowell George of Little Feat. They initially played predominantly bluegrass and a mix of country standards. All four women played and sang, though Martie and Emily provided most of the instrumentation while Lynch and Macy shared lead vocal duties. Martie primarily played fiddle, mandolin, and viola, while Emily's specialties included five-stringed banjo and resonator guitar. In 1987, Martie had won second place, and in 1989, third place in the national fiddle championships held at the Walnut Valley Festival in Winfield, Kansas.

In 1990, Penny Cook, the daughter of then-Texas senator John Tower, gave the Dixie Chicks $10,000 to record an album. Later that year, the Dixie Chicks released their self-produced debut studio album Thank Heavens for Dale Evans on a local independent label called Crystal Clear Sound. The album was named after actress and singer-songwriter Dale Evans. The group paid $5,000 for the 14-track album. Half of this album's tracks consist of cover songs including Patsy Montana's "I Want to Be a Cowboy's Sweetheart", Jon Ims' "West Texas Wind", and Sam Cooke's "Bring It On Home to Me". Macy co-wrote two tracks, with Martie also serving as co-writer for the title track.

A Christmas single was released at the end of the year – a 45 RPM vinyl record titled Home on the Radar Range with "Christmas Swing" on one side and the song on the flip side named "The Flip Side". The record titles were significant; during that period of time, the bandmates dressed up as "cowgirls", and publicity photos reflected this image. They also appeared at the Grand Ole Opry and Garrison Keillor's radio show A Prairie Home Companion. The Dixie Chicks began building a fan base, winning the prize for "best band" at the 1990 Telluride Bluegrass Festival and opening for established country music artists, including Garth Brooks, Reba McEntire, and George Strait.

In 1992, the Dixie Chicks' next Crystal Clear Sound release, Little Ol' Cowgirl, moved towards a more contemporary country sound, as the band used more session musicians, and developed a richer sound with larger and more modern arrangements. Macy and Martie each wrote two of the album's songs, with Lynch co-writing one song with Martie. The band co-produced it with guitarist Larry Seyer, who also played on the album. Displeased with the change in sound, Macy left in late 1992 to devote herself to a "purer" bluegrass sound, remaining active in the Dallas and Austin music scenes. Reviewing their performance at the Birchmere, Virginia in 1992, Eric Brace of The Washington Post wrote that "record label executives will be kicking themselves soon enough ... These Chicks have what it takes to make the big time, yet no major label has taken the plunge to sign them."

Lynch became lead singer on the Dixie Chicks' third Crystal Clear Sound album, Shouldn't a Told You That (1993). Lynch wrote two of the ten tracks on the album, which also included a collaboration with the Erwin sisters on "I'm Falling Again". By this point, the band was still unable to attract support from a major record label and struggled to expand their fan base beyond Texas and Nashville. Their then-manager, Simon Renshaw, approached executive Scott Siman, best known for his work with Tim McGraw, and he signed the band to Sony Music Nashville in November 1995. By the time of their signing, Lynch left the band and Natalie Maines was selected as their third lead singer and second guitarist on the recommendation of her multi-instrumentalist father Lloyd Maines, who contributed to the band's previous albums and has also played for The Maines Brothers Band, Jerry Jeff Walker and Joe Ely.

At the time of Lynch's departure, the sisters attributed it to her weariness of touring and hope to spend more time with her daughter. Lynch offered to stay for the first recordings on the new album, but the sisters thought it would send the wrong message to Sony; they all agreed she would leave before the new album. In a 1996 interview, Lynch said, "It can't really be characterized as a resignation. There are three Dixie Chicks, and I'm only one." In 2003, Lynch said she had no regrets about leaving. Lynch's departure left the Erwin sisters as the two remaining original members.

=== 1995–2000: Commercial success with Wide Open Spaces and Fly ===
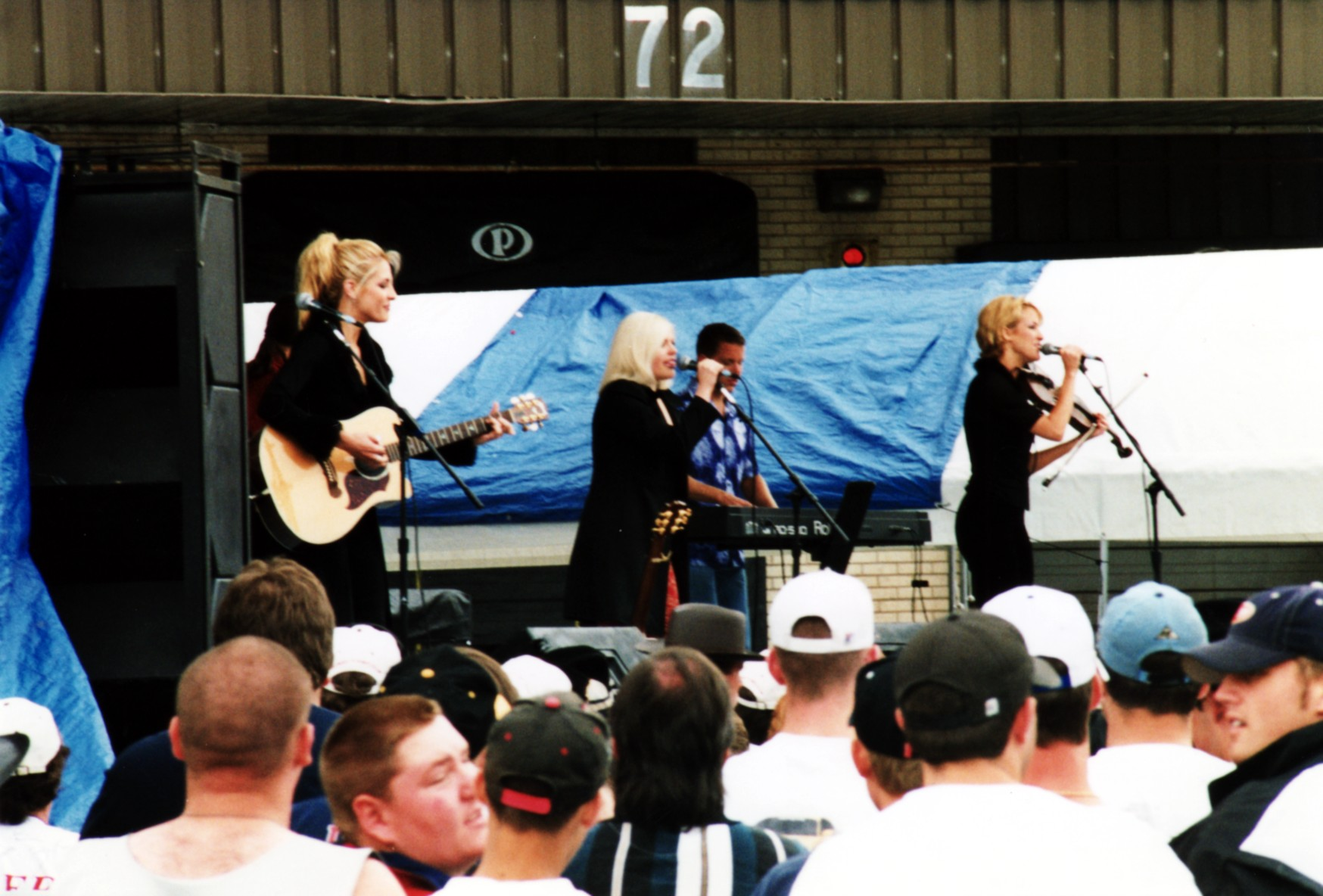
The Dixie Chicks in 1998

With the addition of Maines, the new lineup had a more contemporary sound, as well as a new look, leaving their cowgirl dresses with their past, giving the band a broader appeal. Renshaw sent staff producer Blake Chancey, best known for his work with Deryl Dodd, to Austin to work with the band.

After Maines joined the band, the instrumental lineup was essentially the same, though Maines was not an acoustic bassist. Instead, she played acoustic and electric guitar, and occasionally electric bass guitar or Tacoma Papoose guitar in concert. She sang lead vocals, with Martie and Emily singing backing vocals. Emily was now contributing to the band's sound, adding guitar, accordion, sitar, and papoose to her mastery of the five-string banjo and dobro, while Martie began adding guitar, viola, and mandolin chops more frequently to her expert fiddle. The sisters welcomed the change; Martie said, "It's very rootsy, but then Natalie comes in with a rock and blues influence. That gave Emily and [me] a chance to branch out, because we loved those kinds of music but felt limited by our instruments."

Within the next year, Sony came to Austin to see the revamped band and signed them as the first new artist on the newly revived Monument Records label. While the trio recorded their first Monument album, Wide Open Spaces, their debut single, "I Can Love You Better", was released in October 1997 and reached number seven on the Billboard Hot Country Songs. Monument released the album in January 1998 and charted four more singles: "There's Your Trouble", "Wide Open Spaces", "You Were Mine", and a cover of Joy Lynn White's "Tonight the Heartache's on Me". Of these singles, Martie and Emily co-wrote "You Were Mine". In addition to "Tonight the Heartache's on Me", half of the album's 12 tracks included cover songs such as Radney Foster's "Never Say Die" and Bonnie Raitt's "Give It Up or Let Me Go". "There's Your Trouble", "Wide Open Spaces" and "You Were Mine" became the most successful singles on the album with a number one peak on the country charts. All five singles made top 10 on RPM Country Tracks, then the main country music chart published in Canada, with "Wide Open Spaces" and "You Were Mine" peaking at number one. (Note: RPM ceased publication in November 2000.) Stephen Thomas Erlewine of AllMusic thought the album "appeal[ed] to many different audiences because it was eclectic without being elitist", also stating that "as debuts go (and this does count as a debut), they rarely get better than this".

In March 2020, Wide Open Spaces was certified 13× platinum by the Recording Industry Association of America (RIAA) for shipments of 13 million copies. In Canada, the album was certified quadruple-platinum by the Canadian Recording Industry Association (now Music Canada), a certification which at the time honored shipments of 400,000 copies in that country. (Note: In May 2008, Music Canada reduced the qualification for quadruple-platinum sales from 400,000 to 320,000.)

The commercial success of Wide Open Spaces led to the first of several industry award nominations for the band. The Country Music Association awarded them the Horizon Award for new artists in 1998, given to those who have "demonstrated the most significant creative growth and development in overall chart and sales activity, live performance professionalism and critical media recognition". At the 41st Annual Grammy Awards in 1998, the group was nominated for Grammy Award for Best New Artist, while Wide Open Spaces won Best Country Album and "There's Your Trouble" won Best Country Performance by a Duo or Group with Vocal. The Academy of Country Music also awarded the band as Top Vocal Group and Top New Vocal Duet or Group in 1999; they would win the former again in 2000 and 2001.

The Dixie Chicks' second Monument release was 1999's Fly, which debuted at No. 1 on the Billboard 200 charts, selling over 10 million copies and making the Dixie Chicks the only country band and the only female band of any genre to hold the distinction of having two back-to-back RIAA certified diamond albums. Fly produced a total of nine singles, six of which made the top 10 on the Billboard country singles charts. It was led off by the single "Ready to Run", which appeared on the soundtrack to the 1999 Garry Marshall film Runaway Bride along with the band's cover of the Supremes' "You Can't Hurry Love".

Both Wide Open Spaces and Fly continued to place in the list of the 50 best-selling albums in American history over a half-decade after they were released. Fly again won Grammy awards and honors from the Country Music Association and the Academy of Country Music, and the Dixie Chicks received a number of honors from other sources for their accomplishments. The band headlined their first tour, the Fly Tour, with guest artists including Joe Ely and Ricky Skaggs appearing at each show, and also joined Sarah McLachlan, Sheryl Crow, and other female artists on the all-woman touring Lilith Fair.

The source of the Dixie Chicks' commercial success during this time came from various factors: they wrote or co-wrote about half of the songs on Wide Open Spaces and Fly; their mixture of bluegrass, mainstream country music, blues, and pop songs appealed to a wide spectrum of record buyers; and where the women had once dressed as "cowgirls" with Lynch, their dress was now more contemporary.

"Cowboy Take Me Away" from Fly became another signature song, written by Martie to celebrate Emily's marriage to country singer Charlie Robison, which took place three months before the album's release. However, a few of their songs brought controversy within their conservative country music fan base, and two songs caused some radio stations to remove the Dixie Chicks from their playlists: "Sin Wagon", from which the term "mattress dancing" takes on a new twist, and "Goodbye Earl", a song that uses black comedy in telling the story of the unabashed murderer of an abusive husband. (The band later made a video portraying the nefarious deed, with actor Dennis Franz playing the murdered husband.) In an interview, Maines commented about Sony worrying about the reference to "mattress dancing" in "Sin Wagon", refusing to discuss it in interviews. She said, "Our manager jokes, 'You can't say mattress dancing, but they love the song about premeditated first degree murder'!" She continues, "... so it's funny to us that 'mattress dancing' is out and murder is in!"

=== 2001–2002: Record label dispute and Home ===
After the commercial success of their first two albums, the band became involved in a dispute with their record label, Sony, regarding accounting procedures, alleging that in at least 30 cases Sony had used fraudulent accounting practices, underpaying them at least $4 million (£2.7m) in royalties on their albums over the previous three years. Sony held out, and the trio walked away, with Sony suing the group for failure to complete their contract. The Dixie Chicks responded with their own $4.1-million lawsuit against Sony Music Entertainment on August 27, which added clout to claims made by singers Courtney Love, Aimee Mann, and LeAnn Rimes against the recording industry. After months of negotiation, the Dixie Chicks settled their suit privately, and were awarded their own record label imprint, Open Wide Records, which afforded them more control, a better contract, and an increase in royalty payments, with Sony still responsible for marketing and distribution of albums. Also in 2001, Martie married Irish actor Gareth Maguire.

During the time that they worked with Sony to reconcile their differences, the Dixie Chicks debuted their quiet, unadorned song "I Believe in Love" on the America: A Tribute to Heroes telethon following the September 11 attacks. The three women found themselves home, in Texas, each happily married, planning families, and writing songs closer to their roots, without the usual pressures of the studio technicians from the major labels. The songs they didn't write were solicited from songwriters who wrote with a less commercial emphasis. The result was that Home, independently produced by Lloyd Maines and the Dixie Chicks, was released August 27, 2002. Maines and Martie co-wrote four of the album's twelve tracks. They collaborated with country singer-songwriter Marty Stuart on "I Believe in Love" and "Tortured, Tangled Hearts". Home was led off by a cover of Darrell Scott's "Long Time Gone", which charted at 7 on the Billboard Hot 100 and peaked at number two on the Hot Country Songs chart. It was followed by covers of Fleetwood Mac's "Landslide" and Bruce Robison's "Travelin' Soldier", "Godspeed (Sweet Dreams)" and "Top of the World". Both "Landslide" and "Travelin' Soldier" peaked at number two and number one on Hot Country Songs, respectively. Approximately six million copies of Home were sold in the United States. Home also won Grammy awards, and other noteworthy accolades as before, though it fell short of reaching the diamond record status of the first two albums. Natalie Maines said afterward, "I want to check the record books and see how many fathers and daughters have won Grammys together."

By 2002, the Dixie Chicks were featured on three television specials: An Evening with the Dixie Chicks, which was an acoustic concert primarily composed of the material from Home; VH1 Divas Las Vegas alongside Cher, Céline Dion, Shakira, Anastacia, Stevie Nicks, Mary J. Blige, Cyndi Lauper, Whitney Houston and host Ellen DeGeneres; and a CMT three-hour television special, the 40 Greatest Women of Country Music. Ranked No. 13 out of 40, they were "selected by hundreds of artists, music historians, music journalists and music industry professionals—looking at every aspect of what a great artist is".

=== 2003–2005: Comments on George W. Bush and backlash ===
On March 10, 2003, the Dixie Chicks performed at the Shepherd's Bush Empire theater in London, England. Maines told the audience the band did not support the imminent Allied invasion of Iraq and were ashamed that then-President George W. Bush was from Texas. The remark triggered a backlash in the United States. The band's songs received less airplay on country radio stations, and its members received death threats. "Landslide" also fell from number 10 to 43 on the Billboard Hot 100 in one week and left the chart a week later. The backlash also damaged sales of their next album and tour. Maines issued an apology, saying her remark had been disrespectful; three years later, she rescinded the apology, saying she felt Bush deserved no respect.

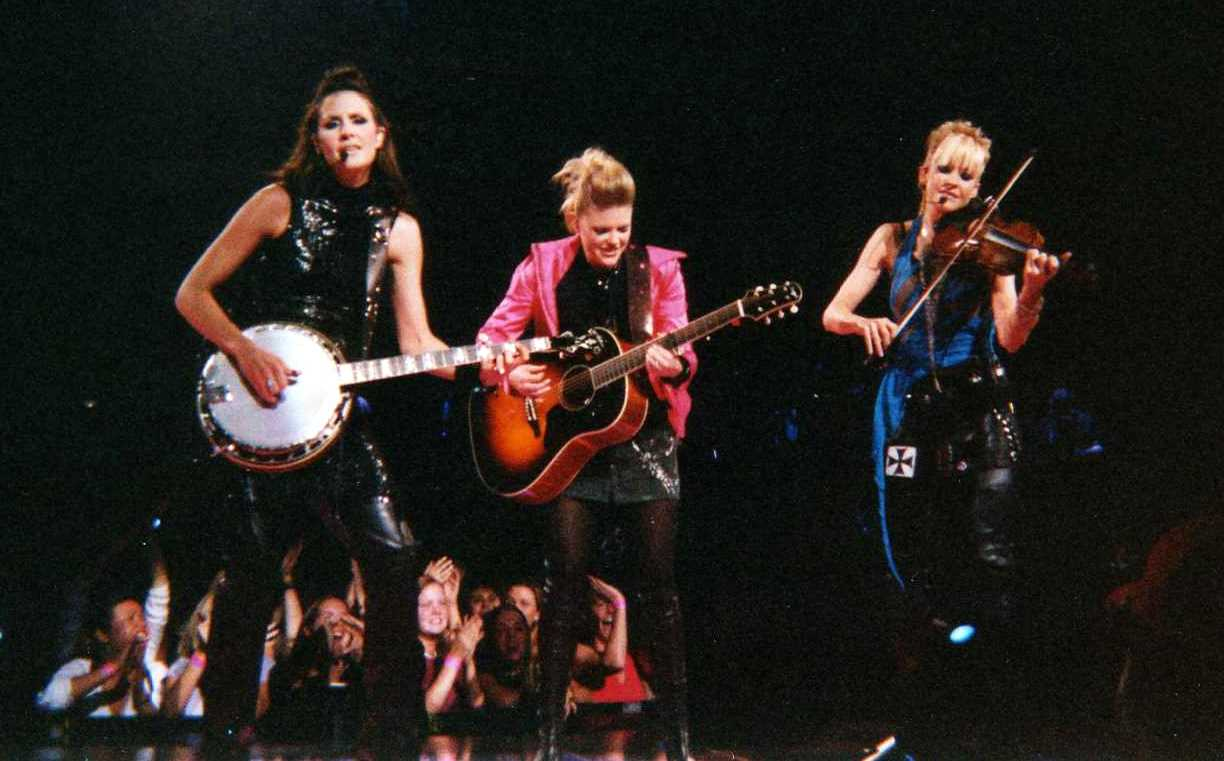
The Dixie Chicks performing at Madison Square Garden on June 20, 2003, during the Top of the World Tour

In 2005, Hurricane Katrina and Hurricane Rita battered the Gulf Coast, with the Dixie Chicks' home state of Texas directly in the wake of the disaster. In September, the Dixie Chicks debuted their song "I Hope" in the telethon Shelter from the Storm: A Concert for the Gulf Coast. It was released as a download with proceeds to benefit hurricane relief through Habitat For Humanity and the American Federation of Musicians Gulf Coast Relief Fund.

In October 2004, the Dixie Chicks joined the Vote for Change tour, performing at concerts organized by MoveOn.org in swing states, raising funds for political groups opposing Bush. In 2005, Martie, Emily, and Maines joined 31 other recording artists, including Dolly Parton, Christina Aguilera, Yoko Ono, and Mandy Moore, supporting relationships of all kinds, regardless of sexual orientation or gender identity, on a two-disc release titled Love Rocks, with their song from the album Home "I Believe in Love".

=== 2006–2007: Taking the Long Way and Shut Up and Sing ===
On March 16, 2006, the Dixie Chicks released the single "Not Ready to Make Nice" in advance of their upcoming album. Cowritten with Dan Wilson, it addressed the political controversy that had surrounded the group for the previous three years. Emily said, "The stakes were definitely higher on that song. We knew it was special because it was so autobiographical, and we had to get it right. And once we had that song done, it freed us up to do the rest of the album without that burden." She said writing the song had become their "therapy", since they had to hold in so many stored emotions for so long. Thus, the band considered the album not so much political as very personal.

Taking the Long Way was released in stores and online on May 22, 2006. The album was produced by Rick Rubin, who had worked with hard rock acts such as Red Hot Chili Peppers and System of a Down, as well as idiosyncratic singers such as Johnny Cash and Neil Diamond. The band felt they had nothing to lose by a newer approach, and possibly quite a bit to gain. The three Chicks co-wrote every song on the album, alongside various other songwriters, including Neil Finn of Crowded House. The album contains references to the 2003 controversy. Taking the Long Way debuted at number one on both the U.S. pop albums chart and the U.S. country albums chart, selling 526,000 copies in the first week (the year's second-best such total for any country act) and making it a gold record within its first week. The Dixie Chicks became the first female band in chart history to have three albums debut at No. 1.

Neither "Not Ready to Make Nice" or second single "Everybody Knows" reached top 35 on Hot Country Songs. In June 2006, Emily noted the lack of support from other country music performers: "A lot of artists cashed in on being against what we said or what we stood for because that was promoting their career, which was a horrible thing to do. ... A lot of pandering started going on, and you'd see soldiers and the American flag in every video. It became a sickening display of ultra-patriotism."

Maines said, "The entire country may disagree with me, but I don't understand the necessity for patriotism. Why do you have to be a patriot? About what? This land is our land? Why? You can like where you live and like your life, but as for loving the whole country ... I don't see why people care about patriotism." The two singles were more successful in Europe, peaking at Nos. 13 and 11 respectively and remaining on the European Country Charts for more than 20 weeks each.

The Accidents & Accusations Tour began in July 2006. Ticket sales were strong in Canada and in some Northeastern markets, but notably weak in other areas. A number of shows were canceled or relocated to smaller venues due to poor sales, and in Houston, Texas, tickets never even went on sale when local radio stations refused to accept advertising for the event. In August, a re-routed tour schedule was scheduled with a greater emphasis on Canadian dates, where Taking the Long Way had gone five-times-platinum. As part of the tour, the Dixie Chicks became the first major band to hire a designated blogger "all-access" to keep up with them in their promotional activities and tour. During the tour, the group members generally refrained from any explicit verbal political comments. When the Dixie Chicks performed again at Shepherd's Bush Empire, site of "The Incident", Maines joked that she wanted to say something the audience had not heard before, but instead said, "Just so y'all know, we're ashamed the President of the United States is from Texas," to much laughter and applause.

In 2006, Taking the Long Way was the ninth-best-selling album in the United States. At the 49th Annual Grammy Awards in February 2007, the Dixie Chicks won all five categories for which they were nominated, including the top awards of Song of the Year and Record of the Year, both for "Not Ready to Make Nice", and Album of the Year, for Taking the Long Way. "Not Ready to Make Nice" was also the group's fourth and final award for Best Country Performance by a Duo or Group with Vocal. Maines interpreted the wins as being a show of public support for their advocacy of free speech. It had been 14 years since an artist had swept those three awards.

After the Grammys, Taking the Long Way hit No. 8 on the Billboard 200 and No. 1 on the country album charts and "Not Ready to Make Nice" re-entered the charts at No. 4 on the Billboard Hot 100. The music video for "Not Ready to Make Nice" was nominated for the 2007 CMT Music Video Awards in the categories of Video of the Year and Group Video of the Year. The group was nominated for the 2007 Country Music Association's award for Top Vocal Group, but lost to Rascal Flatts.

At the 2006 Toronto International Film Festival, Cabin Creek Films, the production company of documentarian Barbara Kopple, premiered Dixie Chicks: Shut Up and Sing. The documentary follows the Dixie Chicks over the three years since the 2003 London concert remark and covers aspects of their musical and personal lives in addition to the controversy.

An ad for Shut Up and Sing was turned down by NBC on October 27, 2006, because of a policy barring ads dealing with "public controversy". Ads were rebuffed by the CW as well, but local affiliate stations of all five major broadcasters, including NBC and CW, ran promotional spots for the film in New York and Los Angeles, the two cities where it opened that day. The film's distributor Harvey Weinstein said, "It's a sad commentary about the level of fear in our society that a movie about a group of courageous entertainers who were blacklisted for exercising their right of free speech is now itself being blacklisted by corporate America."

=== 2008–2014: Hiatus, Court Yard Hounds and continued touring ===
At a December 2007 rally in Little Rock, Arkansas, Maines expressed support for the West Memphis Three, three men convicted of a 1993 triple murder who many believe innocent. Maines cited a recent defense filing implicating Terry Hobbs, the stepfather of one of the victims, and posted similar comments in a letter on the Dixie Chicks website. In August 2008, Emily divorced Charlie Robison. That November, Hobbs sued Maines and the Dixie Chicks for defamation as a result of her statements. On December 2, 2009, a U.S. federal judge dismissed the defamation case on the grounds that Hobbs had not shown the statements were made with actual malice. A proposed April 2008 commercial spot to promote Al Gore's "We Campaign" involving both the Dixie Chicks and Toby Keith was eventually abandoned because of scheduling conflicts. In 2010, Martie and Emily released their first album as Court Yard Hounds, with Emily singing lead vocals. Lloyd Maines said that the Dixie Chicks were "definitely still an entity". Beginning on June 8, 2010, the Dixie Chicks joined the Eagles on their stadium-based Eagles 2010 Summer Tour, visiting cities such as Toronto, Boston, Chicago, Philadelphia, Washington, St. Louis and Winnipeg with a performance at the New Meadowlands Stadium in New Jersey. Australian-American country singer and guitarist Keith Urban appeared at selected shows.

The Dixie Chicks appeared in the 2010 music documentary Sounds Like a Revolution about protest music in America. They sang "You" on the March 2011 release of Rare Bird Alert, a Steve Martin bluegrass album, accompanied by the Steep Canyon Rangers. In March 2011, Maines made a solo recording of the Beach Boys hit "God Only Knows" for the final episode of the HBO series Big Love. In July 2011, Emily and Martie said that new music involving Maines is in the works. That October, following a series of wildfires destroying homes and businesses throughout Texas, the Dixie Chicks played the Concert for Wildfire Relief in Austin. During the set, Maines stated that there was "zero hesitation" when the group was asked to do the show.

In July 2013, the Court Yard Hounds released their second album, Amelita. That month, the band replaced Lady Antebellum as headliners at Canada's Craven Country Jamboree, and later performed at the Ottawa Bluesfest and the Cavendish Beach Music Festival. In October, the Dixie Chicks resumed touring for the Long Time Gone Tour through various cities across Canada and Europe. The tour incorporated the C2C: Country to Country festival held in London and Dublin during March 2014.

=== 2016–present: MMXVI World Tour, name change and Gaslighter ===
In June 2015, a European tour was scheduled to commence in Antwerp on April 16, 2016. The DCX MMXVI World Tour initially included dates for Switzerland, The Netherlands, Scandinavia, the UK and Ireland; however, in November 2015, the tour was extended into North America, with over forty shows scheduled across the United States and Canada. The tour was extended to Australia and New Zealand, and was followed by a live album and video, DCX MMXVI Live.

On the 50th anniversary of the Country Music Association Awards on November 2, 2016, the Dixie Chicks performed alongside Beyoncé on her song "Daddy Lessons". A studio version of the performance was released to digital outlets the following day. They also collaborated with Taylor Swift on her song "Soon You'll Get Better" from Swift's 2019 album Lover. On May 3, 2018, the Dixie Chicks' manager, Simon Renshaw, retired after having managed them since 1995. They signed with Ian Montone and Rick Yorn at Monotone/LBI Entertainment.

On June 25, 2020, the band changed their name to the Chicks, dropping the word "Dixie". The change followed criticism that the word had connotations of slavery in the United States. (Note: The origin of the word "Dixie" is obscure, see Dixie#Origin of the name.) The band said they had picked "that stupid name" as teenagers, and had wanted to change it for years. They decided to change it when they saw the Confederate battle flag described as "the Dixie Swastika" on social media in June 2020. They were also inspired by the George Floyd protests and the Black Lives Matter movement, saying it "definitely lit a fire in us to be on the right side of history". They received the blessing of the Chicks, a New Zealand duo, to share the name. Alongside the name change, the Chicks released the protest song "March March" with a music video directed by Seanne Farmer, in tribute to social justice movements. They also introduced John Silva as their new manager, with publicity by Cindi Berger of R&CPMK.

On July 17, 2020, Columbia released the Chicks' first new studio album in 14 years, Gaslighter, produced by Jack Antonoff. The first single, "Gaslighter", was released on March 4. On August 20, the Chicks performed "The Star-Spangled Banner" at the 2020 Democratic National Convention. On December 22, 2023, founding bassist Laura Lynch died in a traffic collision near El Paso, Texas, at the age of 65. The Chicks issued a statement saying Lynch was "a bright light" whose "undeniable talents helped propel us beyond busking on street corners to stages all across Texas and the mid-West".

== Band members ==
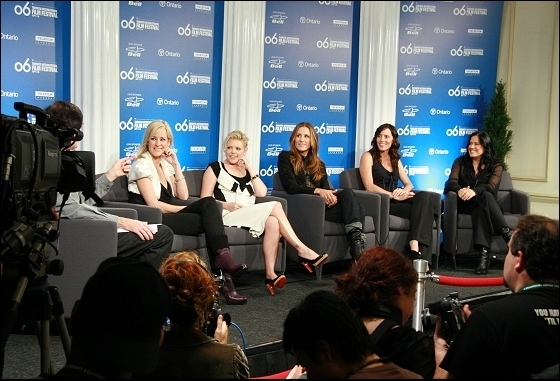
The Dixie Chicks in 2006

=== Current members ===
- Emily Strayer – vocals, banjo, Dobro, guitars (1989–present)
- Martie Maguire – vocals, fiddle, mandolin (1989–present)
- Natalie Maines – vocals, guitars, bass guitar, Omnichord (1995–present)

=== Former members ===
- Laura Lynch – vocals, double bass (1989–1995; died 2023)
- Robin Lynn Macy – vocals, guitars (1989–1992)

== Discography ==
Studio albums

- Thank Heavens for Dale Evans (1990)
- Little Ol' Cowgirl (1992)
- Shouldn't a Told You That (1993)
- Wide Open Spaces (1998)
- Fly (1999)
- Home (2002)
- Taking the Long Way (2006)
- Gaslighter (2020)

== Tours ==
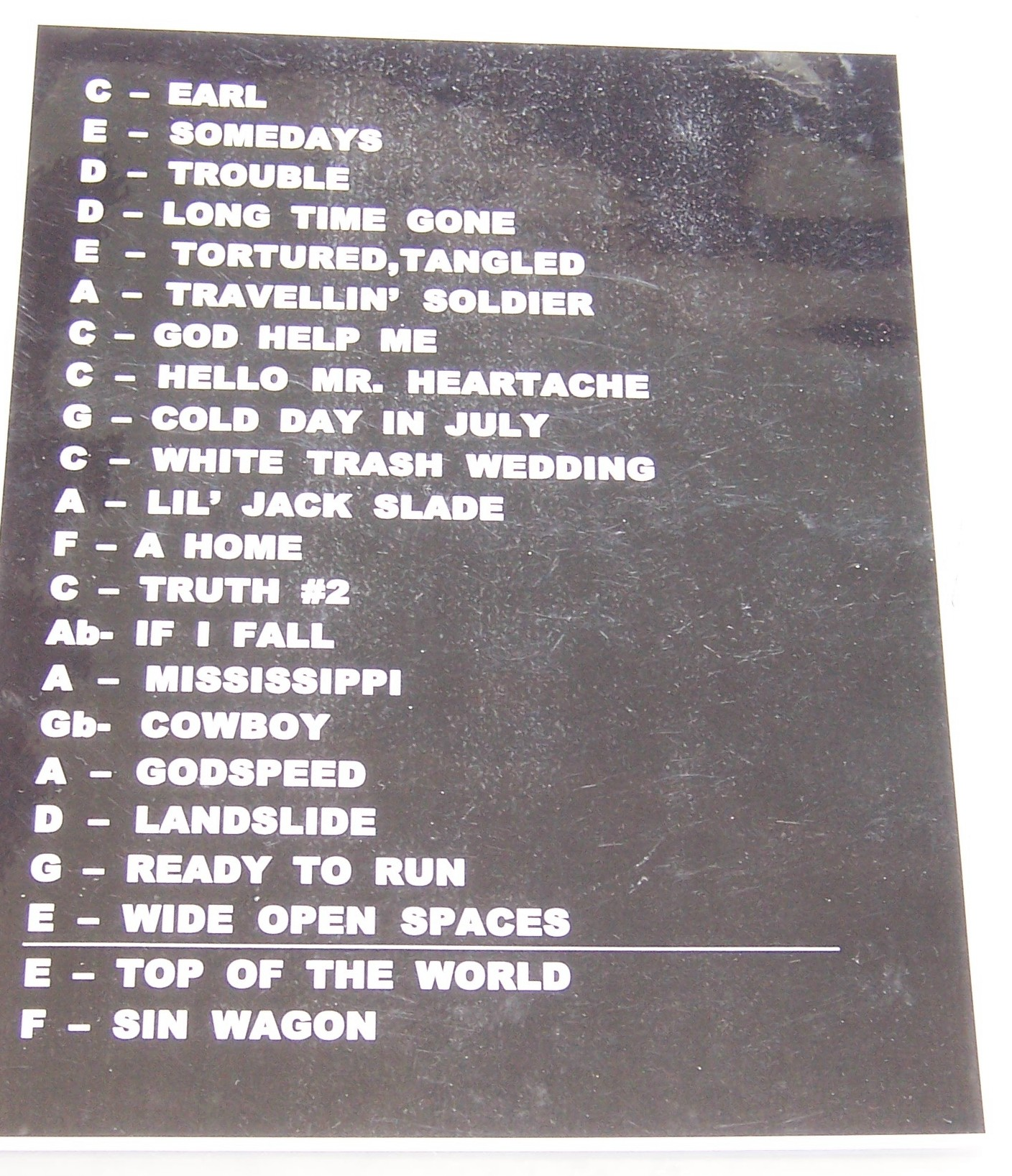
Set list from the Top of the World Tour: Madison Square Garden, June 20, 2003.

Headlining

- Fly Tour (2000)
- Top of the World Tour (2003)
- Accidents & Accusations Tour (2006)
- Long Time Gone Tour (2013–14)
- DCX MMXVI/MMXVII World Tour (2016–17)
- The Chicks Tour (2022–23)
- Taking The Long Way 20th Anniversary Tour (2026)

Supporting

- Clay Walker (1998)
- George Strait Country Music Festival (1999)
- The Bread and Water Tour (1999) with Tim McGraw
- Farewell 1 Tour (2006) with the Eagles; Twickenham Stadium – June 17, 2006
- Eagles (2007) Grand Opening of Nokia Theatre
- Eagles 2010 Summer Tour (2010) with the Eagles
- Pawn Shop Guitar Tour (2026) with Tim McGraw; three shows

Co-headlining Lilith Fair (1999)

- Vote for Change (2004)

Residencies

- The Chicks: Six Nights in Vegas (2023)

== See also ==
- Best selling music artists
- List of best-selling albums in the United States
