= Doug Lancio =

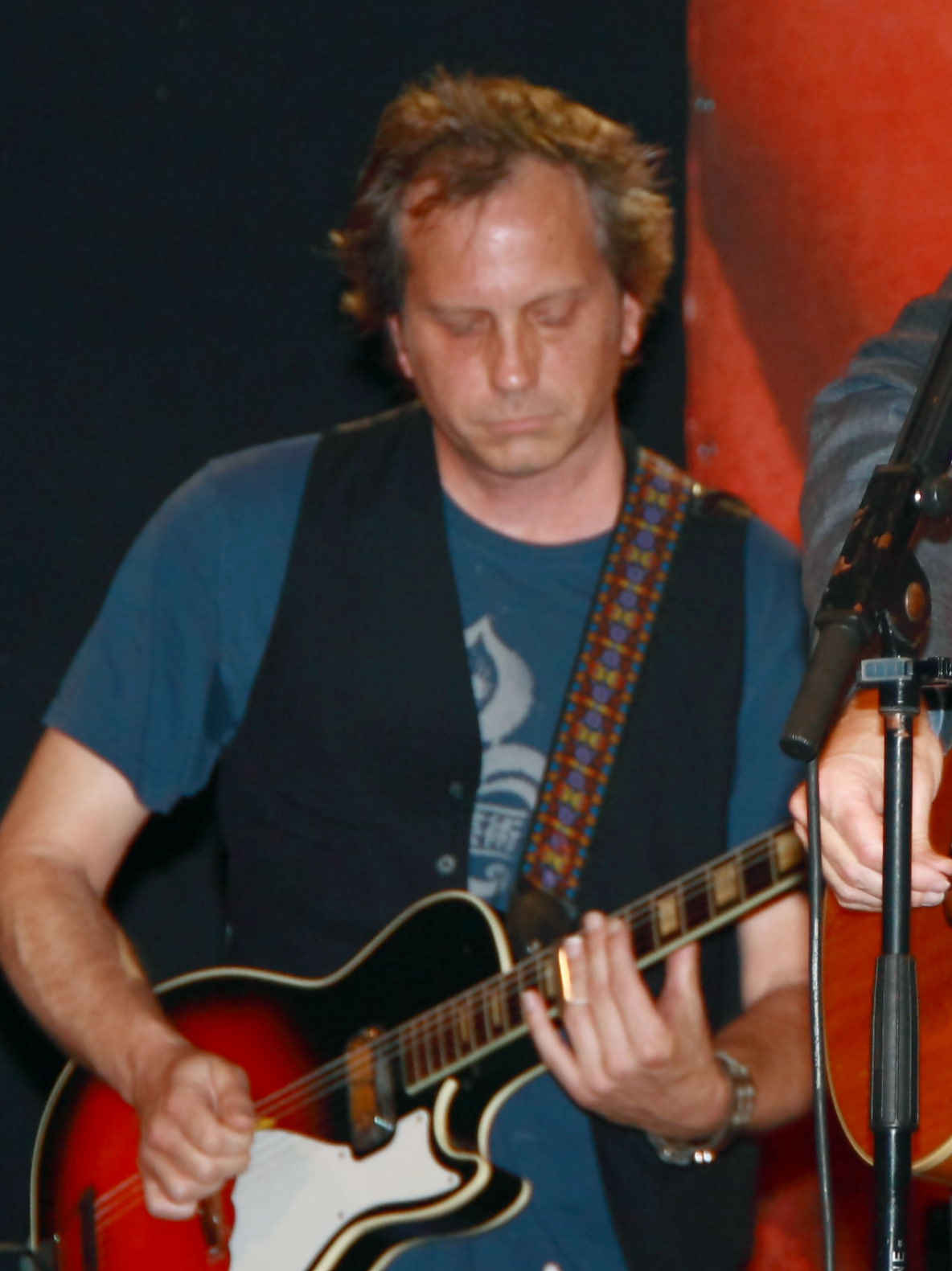
- Lancio with John Hiatt in 2012

Background information
- Genres: Rock, country, folk
- Occupations: Guitarist, record producer
- Instruments: Guitar, mandolin

Doug Lancio is an American guitarist and record producer, based in Nashville, Tennessee. He has worked with a wide range of artists including John Hiatt, Nanci Griffith, Patty Griffin and Bob Dylan.

== Biography ==
=== Questionnaires ===
Lancio was a member of the 1980s group Questionnaires, along with Tom Littlefield (guitar, vocals), Chris Feinstein (bass), and Hunt Waugh (drums).

=== Bedlam ===
With guitarist Jay Joyce and bassist Chris Feinstein, Lancio formed the group Bedlam in 1991. They released an eponymous EP and the album Into the Coals, both on MCA. Bedlam also recorded music for the soundtrack album of the film Reservoir Dogs: "Harvest Moon" and a cover of "Magic Carpet Ride."

=== Touring and recording ===
Lancio has toured and recorded with a number of noted artists. In the mid-'90s he was a member of Tommy Womack's touring and recording band.

Lancio has been a member of John Hiatt's touring bands since 2008. Lancio also produced Hiatt's 2014 album Terms of My Surrender.

Lancio has had a long professional working relationship with Patty Griffin. He first played with Patty on her Silver Bell album, and contributed to other recordings, such as Flaming Red, Children Running Through, Downtown Church, and American Kid. He produced 1000 Kisses and her live album A Kiss in Time.

Lancio has also toured with Tom Jones in support of his recent recordings.

Lancio played guitar with Bob Dylan during the first leg of his Rough and Rowdy Ways World Wide Tour beginning on November 2, 2021.

=== Awards ===
Lancio was nominated for the 2013 Americana Music Award for Instrumentalist of the year.

=== Studio G ===
Lancio maintains Studio G (in partnership with Patty Griffin), a Nashville recording studio that features a Trident 324 mixing console, Studer A827 analog tape recorder, and Telefunken V76 preamps.

== Discography ==
=== As a member of the Questionnaires ===
Albums

- 1989: Window to the World (EMI USA)
- 1991: Anything Can Happen (EMI USA)

Singles

- 1989: "Window To The World (LP Version)" / "Window To The World (Edited Version)" (EMI USA)
- 1989: "Teenage Head" (EMI USA) 12" promo

=== As a member of Bedlam ===
Albums

- 1992: Into The Coals (MCA)

EPs

- 1991: Bedlam (MCA)

Singles

- 1992: "Heaven" (MCA)

=== As producer ===
- 2002: Patty Griffin – 1000 Kisses (ATO)
- 2003: Matthew Ryan – Regret Over the Wires (Hybrid Recordings)
- 2003: Patty Griffin – A Kiss in Time (ATO)
- 2005: RobinElla – Solace For The Lonely (Dualtone)
- 2007: The Greencards – Viridian (Dualtone)
- 2007: Gretchen Peters – Burnt Toast & Offerings (Scarlet Letter / Curb)
- 2008: Matthew Ryan – Matthew Ryan vs. The Silver State (One Little Indian)
- 2008: Todd Snider – Peace Queer (Aimless)
- 2009: Matraca Berg – South Of Heaven (self-released, later became The Dreaming Fields)
- 2009: Jack Ingram – Big Dreams & High Hopes (Big Machine)
- 2011: Ian McFeron – Summer Nights (self-released)
- 2011: Matraca Berg – The Dreaming Fields (Dualtone) - track 10 ("South Of Heaven")
- 2012: Gretchen Peters – Hello Cruel World (Scarlet Letter)
- 2013: Ian McFeron – Time Will Take You (self-released)
- 2014: John Hiatt – Terms of My Surrender (New West)
- 2015: Gretchen Peters – Blackbirds (Scarlet Letter)
- 2015: Ian McFeron – Radio (self-released)
- 2021: Ian McFeron – West Wind (self-released)

=== As sideman ===
==== 1982–1999 ====
- 1982: Nanci Griffith – Poet In My Window (Rounder) - electric guitar
- 1989: The Questionnaires – Window To The World (EMI USA) - guitar
- 1994: Todd Snider – Songs for the Daily Planet (MCA) - guitar on track 4 ("This Land Is Our Land")
- 1995: Tom Ovans – Tales From The Underground (NSR) - electric guitar, acoustic guitar, accordion, bass, percussion
- 1997: Matthew Ryan – May Day (A&M) - electric guitar, resonator guitar
- 1998: Patty Griffin – Flaming Red (A&M) - guitar
- 1998: Nanci Griffith – Other Voices, Too (A Trip Back to Bountiful) (Elektra) - vocals, acoustic guitar, electric guitar, gut-string guitar
- 1998: Sarah Masen – Carry Us Through (re:think) - guitar
- 1998: Tommy Womack – Positively Na Na (Checkered Past)
- 1999: Nanci Griffith and the Blue Moon Orchestra with the London Symphony Orchestra – The Dust Bowl Symphony (Elektra) - electric guitar, acoustic guitar, resonator guitar
- 1999: Troy Campbell – Man Vs. Beast (Blue Rose) - slide guitar

==== 2000–2005 ====
- 2000: Steve Earle – Transcendental Blues (E-Squared) - guitar on track 10 ("When I Fall")
- 2000: Michelle Tumes – Center Of My Universe (Sparrow) - guitar
- 2000: Matthew Ryan – East Autumn Grin (A&M) - electric guitar, acoustic guitar, mandolin
- 2001: Billy Joe Shaver – The Earth Rolls On (New West) - acoustic guitar, electric guitar
- 2001: Nanci Griffith – Clock Without Hands (Elektra) - electric guitar
- 2001: Will Kimbrough – This (Waxysilver) - guitar
- 2001: Maura O'Connell – Walls & Windows (Sugar Hill) - 12-string guitar
- 2002: Jeff Finlin – Somewhere South Of Wonder (Gravity / BMG) - guitar
- 2002: various artists – KGSR Broadcasts Vol. 10 (KGSR) - guitar on track 2-13 (Patty Griffin: "Rain")
- 2004: Nanci Griffith – Hearts in Mind (New Door) - guitar
- 2005: Strays Don't Sleep – Strays Don't Sleep (One Little Indian) - vocals, guitar, percussion
- 2005: various artists – KGSR Broadcasts Vol. 13 (KGSR) - guitar, backing vocals on track 1-08 (Patty Griffin: "When It Don't Come Easy")

==== 2006–present ====
- 2006: Allison Moorer – Getting Somewhere (Sugar Hill) - guitar
- 2007: Patty Griffin – Children Running Through (ATO) - acoustic guitar, electric guitar, autoharp
- 2007: Patty Griffin – Live from the Artists Den DVD (ATO) - guitar
- 2008: Gretchen Peters – Northern Lights (Scarlet Letter) - electric guitar
- 2008: Jeff Finlin – Ballad Of A Plain Man (Bent Wheel) - electric guitar, resonator guitar
- 2008: The Bittersweets – Goodnight, San Francisco (Compass) - electric guitar
- 2009: Holly Williams – Here with Me (Mercury) - guitar
- 2010: John Hiatt – The Open Road (New West) - guitar
- 2011: John Hiatt – Dirty Jeans and Mudslide Hymns (New West) electric guitar, mandolin, 12-string guitar
- 2012: Amelia White – Beautiful And Wild (White-Wolf) - electric guitar, mandolin
- 2012: John Hiatt – Mystic Pinball (New West) - guitar, mandolin, resonator guitar
- 2013: Patty Griffin – American Kid (New West) - guitar, mandolin
- 2013: Scott Miller – Big Big World's (F.A.Y.) - guitar
- 2014: Jennifer Knapp – Set Me Free (Righteous Babe) - guitar
- 2021: Bob Dylan – Rough And Rowdy Ways Tour - guitar
- 2022: Steve Louw – Thunder And Rain (BFD / The Orchard) - guitar, mandolin
