= Lindsey Verrill =

American musician

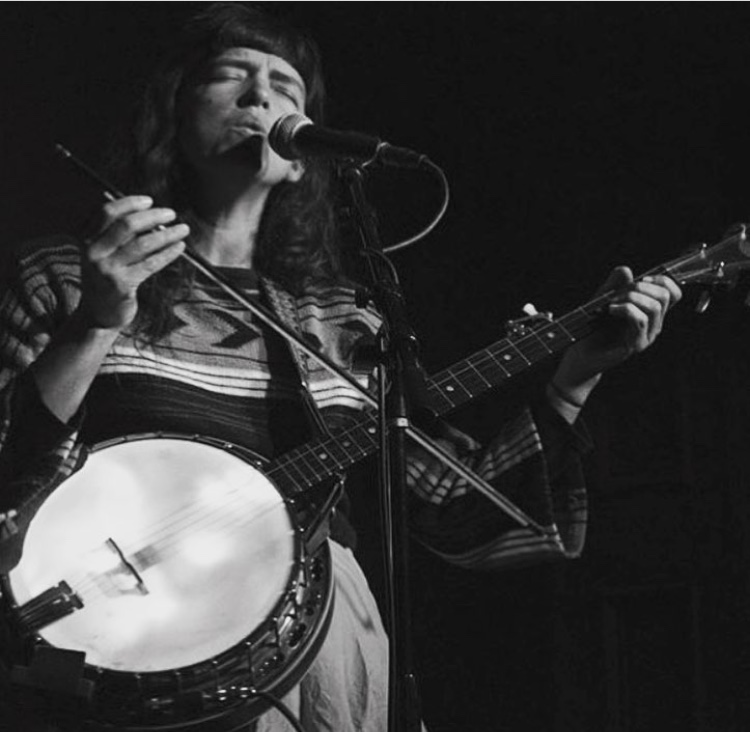
- Verrill performing live

Background information
- Genres: Folk, Indie Rock, Experimental, Experimental folk, Appalachian
- Occupations: Singer, songwriter, producer, arranger, instrumentalist
- Instruments: Banjo, voice, cello, electric bass, upright bass, bass vi
- Label: Dear Life Records

Lindsey Verrill is an American avant-garde multi-instrumentalist from Dallas, Texas who currently lives in Austin, Texas.

== Music career ==
Largely self-taught on cello and upright bass before studying music at the University of North Texas in Denton, Verrill became a key component across a number of indie bands in Austin as well as a founding member of the Austin-based Annie Street Arts Collective. She has performed with Ethan Azarian, Califone, Dana Falconberry, Patty Griffin, Thor Harris, Will Johnson, Longriver, Possessed by Paul James, some say Leland, Charlie Sexton, the Weird Weeds, and Ralph White. In 2017, she traveled to Germany, France, Japan, and Canada as a part of the ATX6.

In 2015, she began performing her own material seriously as part of the experimental folk duo Little Mazarn with Jeff Johnston featuring unusual instrumentation of banjo and musical saw. Verrill and Johnston started Little Mazarn performing at the iconic Austin venue Hole in the Wall, a known haunt of Austin figures such as Townes Van Zandt and Blaze Foley. Both Verrill and Johnston had been playing bass in bands, most notably with Austin musicians Dana Falconberry Lil’ Cap’n Travis, Bill Callahan and others. Little Mazarn was a band where neither of them wanted to play the bass on stage. Little Mazarn was named after a river in northwest Arkansas.

In 2019, Little Mazarn followed up their 2017 self titled EP with their first full length album, Io, a work of folk minimalism including a melancholy reinterpretation of Dancing in the Dark by Bruce Springsteen. The album mainly featured banjo and saw with contributions from guest vocalists Will Johnson and Kendra Kinsey as well as instrumental contributions from Thor Harris and Ralph White.

In 2022, Little Mazarn released their second album ‘Texas River Song’ on Dear Life Records, a so called ‘Geographic love letter’ to Texas, written in 2020 after the pandemic put a complete stop to touring and traveling. .

== Discography ==
- "Mustang Island" (Dear Life Records) 2025
- "Honey Island General Store" Album by Little Mazarn with special guests Lomelda, Acre Memos (Double Yolk Records) 2023
- No Ordinary Crown by Will Johnson (Keeled Scales) 2023
- "Texas River Song" Album by Little Mazarn with special guests Thor Harris, Tim Rutili (Dear Life Records) 2022
- "Werewolf" Single by Little Mazarn with special guests Thor Harris, Craig Ross, Jad Fair (Kill Rock Stars) 2021
- 3 & 4 by Thor & Friends (Joyful Noise Recordings)
- 2 Songs by the Andrew Weathers Ensemble (Timesuck) 2020
- As We Go Wandering by Possessed by Paul James 2020
- El Capitan by Will Johnson (Keeled Scales) 2020
- Patty Griffin by Patty Griffin (Thirty Tigers) 2019
- Io by Little Mazarn 2019
- Wire Mountain by Will Johnson (Keeled Scales) 2019
- Of Seasons by Longriver 2019
- Little Mazarn by Little Mazarn (Self Sabotage Records) 2017
- From the Forest Came the Fire by Dana Falconberry (Modern Outsider) 2016
- Bay of Seething by Moonsicles (Feeding Tube Records) 2016
- Ralph White and Little Mazarn with Ralph White 2015
- Servant of Love by Patty Griffin (Thirty Tigers) 2015
- Creeper by Moonsicles 2014
- Brought Low by Some Say Leland 2014
- Leelanau by Dana Falconberry (Antenna Farm) 2012
- The Weird Weeds by the Weird Weeds (Sedimental) 2012
- Help Me Name Melody by the Weird Weeds (Autobus) 2010
