= Crown of Roses =

Studio album by Patty Griffin
- Released: July 25, 2025
- Length: 34:13
- Label: PGM; Thirty Tigers
- Producer: Craig Ross

Patty Griffin chronology
Tape (2022)	Crown of Roses (2025)

Crown of Roses is the eleventh studio album by the American singer-songwriter Patty Griffin. It was released on July 25, 2025, under Griffin's own imprint PGM with distribution handled by Thirty Tigers. The album was produced by Craig Ross.

== Background ==
Crown of Roses is Griffin's first studio album of newly recorded material since her 2019 eponymous album and first body of work overall since Tape (2022), a collection of previously unreleased home recordings and demos. The album's artwork consists of a photo of Griffin's late mother on the day of her wedding surrounded by pictures that symbolize Griffin and her late mother's childhoods.

== Promotion ==
The album's lead single, "Back at the Start", was released simultaneously with the album's announcement on June 3, 2025. The second single, "Born in a Cage", was released on June 26, 2025.

== Critical reception ==
Upon release, Crown of Roses received positive acclaim from music critics. At Metacritic, which assigns a normalized score out of 100 based on reviews from mainstream publications, the album has an average score of 84 out of 100 based on five reviews, indicating "universal acclaim". Writing for AllMusic, Mark Deming rated the album four out of five stars and wrote: "As an artist, Griffin deals with tough times through her music, and Crown of Roses is as much about the process of wrestling with her sorrows as about coming out the other side. This is art as therapy, and these songs are deeply personal expressions of the pains of her heart and soul, though they touch on enough commonalities to be relatable to nearly everyone." Rob Hughes of Uncut rated the album four-and-a-half stars and opined that the album "succeeds via its concentrated hush, a rootless simmer that suggests the imminent arrival of a full storm."

== Track listing ==
All tracks are written by Patty Griffin; "Born in a Cage" written with Michael Longoria and David Pulkingham; "A Word" written with Pulkingham.

Crown of Roses track listing
No.	Title	Length
1.	"Back at the Start"	4:57
2.	"Born in a Cage"	4:27
3.	"The End"	4:24
4.	"Long Time"	4:28
5.	"All the Way Home"	4:15
6.	"Way Up to the Sky"	3:19
7.	"I Know a Way"	4:48
8.	"A Word"	3:32
Total length:		34:13

== Personnel ==
Credits adapted from Tidal.

- Patty Griffin – lead vocals (all tracks), acoustic guitar (track 6)
- Craig Ross – production (all tracks), bass guitar (1–5, 7, 8)
- Pete Lyman – mastering
- Mike Poole – engineering
- Jim Vollentine – tracking
- Daniel Bacigalupi – engineering assistance
- David Pulkingham – electric guitar (1, 4), acoustic guitar (2, 5, 7, 8)
- Michael Longoria – drums (1, 2, 4, 5, 7)
- Jesse Ebaugh – double bass (2, 4, 5, 8)
- Jeremy Barnes – strings (2, 3, 5, 8)
- Heather Trost – violin (2, 5, 8), strings (3)
- Stephen Barber – arrangement (3)
- Cory Blais – cello (3)
- Karl Mitze – viola (3)
- Nick Montopoli – violin (3)
- Zach Matteson – violin (3)
- Robert Plant – background vocals (4)
- Thor Harris – percussion (4)
- Bukka Allen – organ (7)

== Release history ==
Release dates and formats for Crown of Roses
Region	Date	Format(s)	Label	Ref.
Various	July 25, 2025	CD; digital download; streaming; vinyl LP	PGM; Thirty Tigers	
