= Autopilot (disambiguation) =

The autopilot, or automatic pilot, is an aircraft system that automatically maintains a predetermined route or trajectory.

Autopilot may also refer to:

== Vehicles ==
- Self-steering gear, a ship's system to automatically maintain a chosen course
- Tesla Autopilot, an advanced driver-assistance system offered on Tesla cars

== Music ==
- Automatic Pilot, a 1980s music group created by members of the San Francisco Gay Men's Chorus
- Autopilot (album), the fourth studio album released by American band The Samples
- "Autopilot", song from Coming Up for Air (Kodaline album)
- "Autopilot", Matthew Ryan Concussion (album)
- "Autopilot", Parts & Labor Groundswell (album)
- "Autopilot", a song by Seam from The Problem With Me

== Other ==
- Autopilot, a possibly former Biafran separatist organization led by Simon Ekpa

== See also ==
- Unmanned aircraft
- Unmanned vehicle
