= Servant of Love =

Studio album by Patty Griffin
- Released: September 25, 2015
- Genres: Folk, Americana
- Length: 52:00
- Labels: PGM Recordings, Thirty Tigers
- Producer: Craig Ross

Patty Griffin chronology
Silver Bell (2013)	Servant of Love (2015)	Patty Griffin (2019)

Singles from Servant of Love
- 1. "Rider of Days" Released: July 27, 2015; 2. "There Isn't One Way" Released: August 12, 2015

Professional ratings
Review scores
Source	Rating
AllMusic	4/5 stars

Servant of Love is the ninth studio album by American singer-songwriter Patty Griffin. It was independently released on September 25, 2015, in conjunction with Thirty Tigers. It was nominated for the Grammy Award for Best Folk Album.

== Promotion ==
The first song released from the album was "Rider of Days," in late July 2015. On August 12, 2015, the song "There Isn't One Way" was premiered exclusively by The Wall Street Journal.

== Track listing ==
No.	Title	Length
1.	"Servant of Love"	5:06
2.	"Gunpowder"	4:22
3.	"Good and Gone"	3:11
4.	"Hurt a Little While"	4:06
5.	"250,000 Miles"	4:32
6.	"Made of the Sun"	3:55
7.	"Everything's Changed"	3:42
8.	"Rider of Days"	3:31
9.	"There Isn't One Way"	4:03
10.	"Noble Ground"	4:05
11.	"Snake Charmer"	2:32
12.	"You Never Asked Me"	3:38
13.	"Shine a Different Way"	5:17

== Personnel ==
Musicians

- Conrad Choucroun – drums
- Shawn Colvin – lead vocals, background vocals
- John Deaderick – accordion, piano
- Patty Griffin – composer, mandolin, piano, lead vocals
- Scrappy Jud Newcombe – electric guitar
- Ephraim Owens – trumpet
- David Pulkingham – acoustic guitar, electric guitar
- Craig Ross – bass guitar, drones, drums, acoustic guitar, baritone guitar, Hammond B3 organ
- Lindsey Verrill – bowed bass
- Ralph White – Kalimba

Production

- Gina Binkley – design
- David Boyle – engineer
- Joe Gastwirt – mastering
- Patty Griffin – producer
- Jerry Holmes – technical support
- David McClister – photography
- Beth Middleworth – design
- Cindi Peters – production service
- Mike Poole – mixing
- Craig Ross – engineer, producer
- Mishka Westell – cover illustration

== Chart performance ==
Chart (2015)	Peak position
Dutch Albums (Album Top 100)	31
UK Independent Albums (Official Charts)	24
US Billboard 200	68
US Americana/Folk Albums (Billboard)	3
US Independent Albums (Billboard)	8
US Top Rock Albums (Billboard)	15
US Indie Store Album Sales (Billboard)	13
US Top Album Sales (Billboard)	38
