= Silver Bell (album) =

Studio album by Patty Griffin
- Released: October 8, 2013
- Recorded: 2000
- Studio: Kingsway Studio (New Orleans)
- Genres: Folk; folk rock; Americana
- Length: 59:16
- Labels: A&M Records; UM^{e}
- Producers: Jay Joyce; Craig Ross

Patty Griffin chronology
American Kid (2013)	Silver Bell (2013)	Servant of Love (2015)

Professional ratings
Aggregate scores
Source	Rating
Metacritic	83/100
Review scores
Source	Rating
AllMusic	4/5 stars
American Songwriter	4/5 stars
The Austin Chronicle	3.5/5 stars
Blurt	3/5 stars
Paste	7.5/10
PopMatters	10/10
Record Collector	3/5 stars
Rolling Stone	3.5/5 stars
The Sydney Morning Herald	4/5 stars
Uncut	8/10

Silver Bell is an album by American singer-songwriter Patty Griffin, released by A&M Records through UM^{e} on October 8, 2013. It was originally recorded in 2000 as the follow-up to Griffin's second album Flaming Red (1998).

== Production ==
Griffin recorded the album's fourteen tracks in 2000 at Daniel Lanois' Kingsway Studio in New Orleans, Louisiana. She was accompanied by co-producer Jay Joyce and Doug Lancio on guitar, John Deaderick on keyboards, Frank Swart on bass, and Billy Beard on percussion. Emmylou Harris sang harmony vocals on the track "Truth #2".

The album was newly mixed by Glyn Johns for its 2013 release.

== Commercial performance ==
Silver Bell debuted at number 64 on the Billboard 200 and number 5 on the Billboard Folk Albums chart. As of September 2015, it had sold 21,000 copies in the United States.

== Track listing ==
All tracks are written by Patty Griffin, except where noted.

No.	Title	Writer(s)	Length
1.	"Little God"		5:05
2.	"Truth #2"		4:31
3.	"Boston"		4:03
4.	"Perfect White Girls"		3:49
5.	"Sooner or Later"		3:26
6.	"What You Are"	Griffin; Craig Ross	4:43
7.	"Silver Bell"		3:09
8.	"Fragile"		3:39
9.	"Mother of God"		4:15
10.	"One More Girl"		5:01
11.	"Sorry and Sad"		3:15
12.	"Driving"		4:18
13.	"Top of the World"		5:01
14.	"So Long"		5:07
Total length:			59:16

== Chart performance ==
Chart (2013)	Peak position
US Billboard 200	64
US Americana/Folk Albums (Billboard)	5
US Top Rock Albums (Billboard)	22
US Indie Store Album Sales (Billboard)	25
