= The Highway (album) =

Studio album by Holly Williams
- Released: February 5, 2013
- Genre: Americana, Country
- Length: 45:11
- Label: Georgiana
- Producer: Charlie Peacock

Holly Williams chronology
Here with Me (2009)	The Highway (2013)

The Highway is the third studio album from recording artist Holly Williams. Released on February 5, 2013, the album reached No. 1 on the Billboard Heatseekers chart.

== Track listing ==
No.	Title	Writer(s)	Length
1.	"Drinkin'"	Holly Williams	3:42
2.	"Gone Away from Me" (featuring Jackson Browne)	Williams	4:30
3.	"Railroads"	Williams	3:43
4.	"Happy"	Williams, Chris Coleman	4:08
5.	"The Highway"	Williams	4:23
6.	"Without You" (featuring Jakob Dylan)	Williams, Lori McKenna	3:57
7.	"Let You Go"	Williams, Coleman	2:59
8.	"Giving Up"	Williams	3:53
9.	"A Good Man"	Williams, Sarah Buxton	4:01
10.	"'Til It Runs Dry" (featuring Dierks Bentley)	Williams, Cary Barlowe, Coleman	3:08
11.	"Waiting on June" (featuring Gwyneth Paltrow)	Williams	6:47

== Personnel ==
- Sam Ashworth – acoustic guitar, percussion
- Cary Barlowe – acoustic guitar
- Dierks Bentley – duet vocals on "'Til It Runs Dry"
- Bruce Bouton – pedal steel guitar
- Steve Brewster – drums, percussion
- Jackson Browne – duet vocals on "Gone Away from Me"
- Chris Coleman – drums, acoustic guitar, electric guitar, lap steel guitar, mandolin, percussion, background vocals
- Dan Dugmore – lap steel guitar, pedal steel guitar
- Jakob Dylan – duet vocals on "Without You"
- Mark Hill – bass guitar
- Tammy Rogers-King – fiddle
- Doug Lancio – electric guitar
- Andy Leftwich – fiddle
- Ken Lewis – percussion
- Jerry McPherson – acoustic guitar, electric guitar
- Phil Madeira – organ
- Gwyneth Paltrow – harmony vocals on "Waiting on June"
- Charlie Peacock – keyboards, percussion, piano, trumpet, background vocals, Wurlitzer
- Matt Slocum – cello
- Holly Williams – drums, acoustic guitar, electric guitar, piano, lead vocals, background vocals
- Glenn Worf – bass guitar, upright bass

== Charts ==
Chart (2013)	Peak position
US Billboard 200	146
US Top Country Albums (Billboard)	18
US Folk Albums (Billboard)	8
US Heatseekers Albums (Billboard)	1
US Independent Albums (Billboard)	24
