= Downtown Church =

Studio album by Patty Griffin
- Released: January 26, 2010
- Recorded: January 2009
- Genre: Gospel
- Length: 47:01
- Label: Credential Recordings
- Producer: Buddy Miller

Patty Griffin chronology
Patty Griffin: Live from the Artist's Den (2007)	Downtown Church (2010)	American Kid (2013)

Downtown Church is the sixth studio album by American singer-songwriter Patty Griffin, released on January 26, 2010, by Credential Recordings, a Christian label distributed by EMI. The album was recorded in Downtown Presbyterian Church in Nashville and features different styles. Griffin has stated that she recorded the album to explore her feelings about religion. The album debuted at number 38 on the Billboard 200 and topped the Billboard Christian Albums and Folk Albums charts. The critical response was "generally favorable". On February 13, 2011, Downtown Church won the Grammy for Best Traditional Gospel Album. This was Patty Griffin's first Grammy award, after previously being nominated for Best Contemporary/Folk Americana Album for Children Running Through in 2007.

== Background and recording ==
Griffin has stated that she did not have a background in gospel music before recording Downtown Church. She had appeared on the 2009 compilation Oh Happy Day: An All-Star Music Celebration in a duet with Mavis Staples. Peter York, president of the EMI Christian Music Group, suggested Griffin record a gospel album, and she agreed under the condition that Buddy Miller work as producer. Miller agreed and found the Downtown Presbyterian Church, Nashville, after which the album was named, and where the album was recorded in January 2009. The album was recorded in collaboration with Buddy Miller, Emmylou Harris, Shawn Colvin, gospel group The Fairfield Four, Jim Lauderdale, Raul Malo, Mike Farris, and Julie Miller. The recording took five days, one day rehearsal and four days playing, and was described as sometimes exhausting.

Downtown Church consists of cover songs, traditional songs, and original songs by Griffin, and Billboard has described the album as a "gospel-style record" influenced by traditional country music and blues. Griffin stated that the album was an attempt to familiarize pop fans with gospel music and that she intentionally used different styles to "mix it up". A Spanish hymn, "Virgen de Guadalupe", was suggested by Michael Ramos, a member of Griffin's band. Griffin stated that she had listened to Christian songs by Bob Dylan, but failed to connect to them, and wrote her songs partly in reaction to their certainty and her ambivalence about rigid doctrine. She told National Public Radio that she was "working through complicated feelings about religion" and recorded the album to explore them. Griffin described her original song "Coming Home to Me" as sharing a recurring theme of her music, loneliness and connection, and being about "what really goes on inside, deep down". The final song, "All Creatures of Our God and King" is based on Francis of Assisi.

== Critical reception ==
Professional ratings
Review scores
Source	Rating
Allmusic	4/5 stars
American Songwriter	4/5 stars
Associated Baptist Press	(favorable)
Associated Press	(favorable)
The A.V. Club	B+
Austin American-Statesman	B+
The Austin Chronicle	3.5/4 stars
Detroit Free Press	4/4 stars
Paste	74
Slant Magazine	4/5 stars
The Star-Ledger	(favorable)
USA Today	3.5/4 stars

The album was favorably reviewed by Slant Magazine reviewer Jonathan Keefe who praised Griffin as a natural fit for the songs and passionate "that even a nonbeliever can get on board". Jim Caligiuri of The Austin Chronicle called the album "haunting and original" and described the new direction compared to Griffin's previous album as a "gutsy move". Michael McCall of the Associated Press described the album as a "stunningly powerful and compassionate work". Kyle Matthews of the Associated Baptist Press noted that the album was cohesive despite a variety of styles and praised the song selection as "beyond stereotypes". Martin Bandyke of the Detroit Free Press called the album "uplifting and utterly majestic". Michael Corcora of the Austin American-Statesman praised Griffin as an "amazingly athletic singer" but criticized the album as "often divinely stirring" but lacking "a deep spiritual core". Noel Murray of The A.V. Club remarked on the choice of unconventional songs "I Smell A Rat", "Death's Got A Warrant", and "Virgen De Guadalupe" and described the album as "heartfelt", but "a little generic at times". Gage Henry of Paste stated that the album had "drastic turns" and praised Griffin's sentiment. Jewly Hight of American Songwriter praised the album and argued that the album had no "flat performances". David Belcher of The New York Times described the album as a "celebration" that was subtle but sometimes "foot-stomping". Jerry Shriver of USA Today praised the restraint and versatility of the album. Andrew Whitman of Christianity Today called the album "surprisingly diverse and beautifully sung" but argued that the secular "I Smell a Rat" did not fit with the religious material. Jay Lustig of The Star-Ledger described the album as "pop-folk-gospel fusion" and noted that the album includes songs that are slow, quick, mellow, and blunt. Mark Deming of Allmusic stated that Downtown Church was one of a string of good albums Griffin made since 1996 and was appealing "regardless of [one's] religious convictions".

== Awards ==
The album won a Dove Award for Inspirational Album of the Year at the 42nd GMA Dove Awards.

== Track listing ==
The album contains seven traditional songs, five cover songs, and two original songs.

1. "House of Gold" (Hank Williams) – 2:53
2. "Move Up" (traditional) – 2:44
3. "Little Fire" (Griffin) – 4:07
4. "Death's Got a Warrant" (traditional) – 1:44
5. "If I Had My Way" (Rev. Gary Davis) – 3:24
6. "Coming Home to Me" (Griffin) – 3:33
7. "Wade in the Water" (traditional) – 3:08
8. "Never Grow Old" (traditional) – 3:11
9. "Virgen de Guadalupe" (traditional) – 3:32
10. "I Smell a Rat" (Jerry Leiber and Mike Stoller) – 2:31
11. "Waiting for My Child" (Sullivan Pugh) – 4:16
12. "The Strange Man" (Dorothy Love Coates) – 3:38
13. "We Shall All Be Reunited" (A. Karnes and B. Bateman) – 4:11
14. "All Creatures of Our God and King" (traditional) – 4:17

== Personnel ==
- Patty Griffin – vocals
- Buddy Miller – production, mixing, guitar, vocals
- Jim DeMain – mastering
- Mike Poole – engineering
- Gordon Hammond – assistance with engineering
- Kathi Whitley - production coordination
- Maple Byrne - production assistance
- Dennis Crouch – bass
- Jay Bellerose – drums
- Doug Lancio – guitar
- Stuart Duncan – fiddle
- John Deaderick – piano
- John Catchings – cello
- Bryan Owings – percussion
- Russ Pahl – pedal steel guitar
- Emmylou Harris – vocals
- Raul Malo – vocals
- Jim Lauderdale – vocals
- Shawn Colvin – vocals
- Mike Farris – vocals
- Julie Miller – vocals
- Regina McCrary – vocals
- Ann McCrary – vocals

== Chart positions ==
Chart	Peak
Billboard 200	38
Billboard Christian Albums	1
Billboard Folk Albums	1
