= Concussion (disambiguation) =

A concussion is a type of traumatic brain injury.

Concussion may also refer to:

- Concussion (2013 film), an American drama directed by Stacie Passon
- Concussion (2015 film), an American biographical sports drama directed by Peter Landesman
- Concussion (album), a 2001 album by Matthew Ryan
- Concussion (seismology), a pre-earthquake effect that resulted from Earth's tectonic plate movement or collision

== See also ==
- Phonon noise
