= A Thousand Kisses =

A Thousand Kisses or 1000 Kisses may refer to:

- A Thousand Kisses (film) (Ik Omhels Je Met 1000 Armen), a 2006 Dutch film
- A Thousand Kisses (TV series), a 2011 South Korean TV drama
- A Thousand Kisses (radio play), 2011, by Frederic Raphael
- 1000 Kisses (album), 2002, by Patty Griffin
- "1000 Kisses" (song), 2002, by Will Smith
