= The Ones We Never Knew =

Studio album by Holly Williams
- Released: October 5, 2004
- Genre: Country
- Label: Universal South Records
- Producer: Monroe Jones and Holly Williams

Holly Williams chronology
The Ones We Never Knew (2004)	Here with Me (2009)

The Ones We Never Knew is the debut album of American country music artist Holly Williams. It was released on October 5, 2004 by Universal South Records. Its only single, "Sometimes", failed to chart, although it was made into a music video. Williams co-produced the album and wrote all twelve of its songs.

== Critical reception ==
Professional ratings
Review scores
Source	Rating
Allmusic	3.5/5 stars

Giving the album three-and-a-half stars out of five, Stephen Thomas Erlewine of Allmusic called it "a classy, tasteful album", saying that the album showed Williams' songwriting ambition, but could have used more variances in tempo.

== Track listing ==
All songs written by Holly Williams.

1. "Sometimes" – 3:01
2. "Everybody's Waiting for a Change" – 3:30
3. "Would You Still Have Fallen" – 3:50
4. "Take Me Down" – 3:04
5. "Between Your Lines" – 4:00
6. "I'll Only Break Your Heart" – 3:40
7. "Cheap Parades" – 3:49
8. "Man in the Making" – 3:29
9. "Memory of Me" – 2:59
10. "Velvet Sounds" – 4:16
11. "All as It Should Be" – 3:04
12. "Nothing More" – 5:02

== Personnel ==
- David Angell – violin
- Monisa Angell – viola
- Tom Bukovac – acoustic guitar, electric guitar
- Larry Campbell – steel guitar
- Spencer Campbell – bass guitar, double bass
- David Davidson – viola, violin
- James DiGirolamo – keyboards
- Mike Haynes – flugelhorn, trumpet
- John Jackson – dobro
- Monroe James – keyboards
- Ken Lewis – drums, percussion
- Ethan Pilzer – bass guitar
- George Recile – drums
- Jeff Roach – piano
- Kevin Teel – electric guitar
- Matthew Walker – cello
- Holly Williams – acoustic guitar, piano, lead vocals, background vocals
