= East Autumn Grin =

Studio album by Matthew Ryan
- Released: August 15, 2000
- Genre: Rock
- Length: 53:46
- Label: A&M

Matthew Ryan chronology
May Day (1997)	East Autumn Grin (2000)	Concussion (2001)

Professional ratings
Review scores
Source	Rating
AllMusic	2/5 stars

East Autumn Grin is Matthew Ryan's second album. It was released on August 15, 2000, on A&M Records.

== Track listing ==
All words and music by Matthew Ryan, except where noted.

1. "3rd of October"
2. "Heartache Weather"
3. "I Hear a Symphony"
4. "Me and My Lover"
5. "Sunk"
6. "Sadlylove"
7. "I Must Love Leaving"
8. "Ballad of a Limping Man"
9. "Time and Time Only"
10. "The World Is on Fire"
11. "Still Part Two"
12. "Worry" (words by Matthew Ryan, music by Matthew Ryan, David Ricketts)
13. "August Summer Dress" (words by Matthew Ryan, music by Matthew Ryan, David Ricketts) (hidden track)

== Personnel ==
- Doug Lancio - acoustic guitar, electric guitar, mandolin
- Chris Feinstein - bass, backing vocals
- Josh Rouse - backing vocals
- Johnette Napolitano - backing vocals
- Trina Shoemaker - backing vocals
- Tommy Williams - drums, percussion, backing vocals
- Ethan Johns - drums
- Will Kimbrough - piano, electric guitar, Omnichord [ambient], synth, vocals
- Pat Sansone - piano
- Carl Meadows - piano
- David Ricketts - synth
- David Henry - cello, violin
- Ned Henry - violin
- Matthew Ryan - vocals, acoustic guitar, piano
