= Tape (album) =

Demo album by Patty Griffin
- Released: June 10, 2022
- Length: 29:52
- Language: English
- Label: PGM/Thirty Tigers

Patty Griffin chronology
Patty Griffin (2019)	Tape (2022)	Crown of Roses (2025)

Tape is a 2022 studio album by American singer-songwriter Patty Griffin made up of home recordings and demos. The release has received a positive reception from critics.

== Recording and release history ==
The recordings were found among old digital files that Griffin sorted through during the COVID-19 pandemic, recorded by herself using GarageBand and TapeDeck, both at her home and in a Nashville studio. After sorting through a large quantity of songs, Griffin chose a handful of songs that represented takes close to the emotional core of her songwriting, in spite of how rough many of the recordings are.

Tape was released via compact disc, music download, and music streaming platforms on June 10, 2022, with a cassette tape release following on June 17.

== Reception ==
Jim Hynes of Glide Magazine gave Tape a positive review, noting the poor audio quality of the recordings, but also the power that Griffin has as a songwriter, summing up that "all the beauty and intensity you expect from Patty Griffin are packaged nicely in these ten selections". No Depression's Matt Conner similarly notes that the outtakes are not a "lazy release of anything from the cutting room floor; instead, it’s a thoughtful collection of found objects that will undoubtedly please Griffin’s substantial fan base" with his only complaint being that the album was not longer.

== Track listing ==
All songs written by Patty Griffin

1. "Get Lucky" – 2:46
2. "One Day We Could" – 3:00
3. "Strip of Light" – 1:57
4. "Don't Mind" – 3:48
5. "Sundown" – 3:55
6. "Little Yellow House" – 3:59
7. "Night" – 2:28
8. "Kiss of a Man" – 3:04
9. "Octaves" – 1:42
10. "Forever Shall Be" – 3:13

== Personnel ==
- Patty Griffin – guitar, piano, vocals
- Robert Plant – vocals on "Don't Mind"

== Charts ==
Chart (2022)	Peak position
UK Americana Albums (OCC)	18
US Top Album Sales (Billboard)	83

== See also ==
- Lists of 2022 albums
