= Regret Over the Wires =

Studio album by Matthew Ryan
- Released: September 23, 2003
- Genre: Folktronica
- Length: 46:02
- Label: Hybrid Recordings
- Producer: Doug Lancio

Matthew Ryan chronology
Happiness (2003)	Regret Over the Wires (2003)	These Are Field Recordings (2004)

Regret Over the Wires is an album by Matthew Ryan, released September 23, 2003 by Hybrid Recordings.

== Track listing ==
All words and music by Matthew Ryan, except where noted.

1. "Return to Me" – 4:48
2. "The Little Things" – 3:00
3. "Trouble Doll" – 4:50
4. "Long Blvd." – 3:39
5. "I Can't Steal You" – 4:13
6. "Caged Bird" – 4:15
7. "Come Home" – 3:01
8. "I Hope Your God Has Mercy on Mine" – 3:21
9. "Nails" (music by J. J. Johnson, Doug Lancio, Mark Robertson, Matthew Ryan) – 4:12
10. "Sweetie" (music by Doug Lancio) – 3:12
11. "Every Good Thing" – 2:42
12. "Skylight" – 4:49

== Personnel ==
- Mark Robertson - bass, backing vocals
- J. J. Johnson - drums, percussion
- Kevin Teel - electric guitar
- Doug Lancio - electric guitar, acoustic guitar, slide guitar, baritone guitar, resonator guitar, mandolin, synth, backing vocals
- Matthew Ryan - vocals, guitar, piano, synth, organ
