= Impossible Dream (Patty Griffin album) =

Studio album by Patty Griffin
- Released: April 20, 2004
- Genre: Contemporary Folk
- Length: 48:38
- Label: ATO Records
- Producer: Craig Ross

Patty Griffin chronology
A Kiss in Time (2003)	Impossible Dream (2004)	Children Running Through (2007)

Professional ratings
Review scores
Source	Rating
Allmusic	link
Entertainment Weekly	B+

Impossible Dream is the fourth studio album (fifth album overall) by the American folk musician Patty Griffin, released on April 20, 2004. The album features an unlisted song – Griffin’s mother and father singing “The Impossible Dream” – at the end of “Top of the World.”

Impossible Dream reached a peak of number 67 on the Billboard 200 chart, selling 16,000 copies in the United States in its first week.

== Track listing ==
All tracks composed by Patty Griffin

1. “Love Throw a Line” – 3:38
2. “Cold as It Gets” – 2:38
3. “Kite” – 3:09
4. “Standing” – 4:04
5. “Useless Desires” – 5:50
6. “Top of the World” – 5:28
7. “Rowing Song” – 3:26
8. “When It Don’t Come Easy” – 4:52
9. “Florida” – 5:01
10. “Mother of God” – 7:14
11. “Icicles” – 3:18

== Personnel ==
- Patty Griffin – vocals, guitar, piano
- Emmylou Harris – background vocals
- Lisa Germano – violin, zither
- Ian McLagan – electric piano
- Julie Miller – background vocals
- Billy Beard – drums
- Brian Beattie – bowed bass, pump organ
- Doug Lancio – guitar, mandolin
- Michael Ramos – trumpet
- Frank Howard Swart – bass
- Sumner Erickson – tuba
- John Deaderick – organ
- Brady Blade, Jr. – drums
- JD Foster – bass, percussion
- Jonathan Greene – drums

== Charts ==
Chart (2004)	Peak position
US Billboard 200	67
