= Dana Falconberry =

American songwriter

Dana Falconberry is an American songwriter and musician originally from Dearborn, Michigan later based in Austin, Texas. She is known for her songwriting that focuses on themes of nature and wildlife. Since 2011, she has mostly played (both live and on record) backed by her five-piece band composed of Christopher Cox, Gina Dvorak, Karla Manzur, Matthew Shepherd, and Lindsey Verrill.

== History ==
Originally interested in pursuing dance and choreography, Falconberry attended Hendrix College in Arkansas where she learned to play guitar and write songs. She moved to Austin in 2004 to turn her focus towards music. While in Austin, she fostered a career as a singer-songwriter, recording three albums, and touring the US, Portugal, Japan, the UK, and France. She also spent time as a singer in the folk band Peter and the Wolf.

In 2011, Falconberry recruited her current band to record Leelanau, a set of songs inspired by her childhood trips to the Leelanau Peninsula. Leelanau was released on Oakland's Antenna Farm Records in 2012 and was followed by multiple tours of the US, including supporting shows with Heartless Bastards and Califone.

Falconberry and her band have played on festivals including ACL Fest, SXSW Music Festival, and Noise Pop Festival.

Jon Pareles of The New York Times has described the live performance as "gentle yet intricate: a rusticated chamber music using banjo, cello, and staggered, contrapuntal vocal harmonies with the other women in her band, in songs full of wordless interludes that unfurled a skein of possibilities."

Falconberry's art (stichings, paintings and paintstichings), music (releasing on Patreon and Bandcamp), projects and events can be accessed at danafalconberry.com

== Discography ==
=== Albums ===
- Paper Sailboat (self-released - 2007)
- Oh Skies Of Grey (00:02:59 Records - 2008)
- Halletts (self-released - 2010)
- Leelanau (Antenna Farm Records - 2012)
- From the Forest Came the Fire (as 'Dana Falconberry and Medicine Bow') - (Modern Outsider - 2016)
- Dreamland: songs for lulling (self-released - 2017)

=== EPs and singles ===
- Though I Didn't Call It Came (Crossbill Records - 2011)
- Public Hi-Fi Sessions 02 (Public Hi-Fi Records - 2014)
- The Lowering Night (self released - 2015)

=== Singles ===
- Silver River (self-released - 2017)
- Who Will Be the Only One (self-released - 2019)
- Tidepool Eyes (self-released - 2020)
- Seer (self-released - 2020)
- Someone to Watch over Me
