= Hopeless to Hopeful =

Dissent From the Living Room

Studio album by Matthew Ryan
- Released: 2002
- Genre: Alternative country

Matthew Ryan chronology
Dissent from the Living Room (2002)	Dissent From the Living Room (2002)	Happiness (2003)

Hopeless to Hopeful... is an album released by Matthew Ryan in December 2002. It was recorded in his own home. It was sold only as a limited edition album between December 2002 and January 1, 2003.

== Track listing ==
All words and music by Matthew Ryan.

1. "Rain, Rain, Rain" – 1:32
2. "Song for Sons" – 2:48
3. "Veteran's Day" – 3:25
4. "I'm an American" – 2:56
5. "Everybody Always Leaves" – 2:54
6. "I Can't Steal You" – 4:04
7. "This Side of Heaven" – 2:26
8. "Postcard to Useless" – 3:57
9. "Little Drummer Boy" – 4:45
10. "From the Floor" – 3:44
