= Here with Me (album) =

Studio album by Holly Williams
- Released: June 16, 2009
- Genre: Country
- Length: 36:19
- Label: Mercury Nashville
- Producer: Justin Niebank, Tony Brown

Holly Williams chronology
The Ones We Never Knew (2004)	Here with Me (2009)	The Highway (2013)

Singles from Here with Me
- 1. "Keep the Change" Released: March 21, 2009; 2. "Mama" Released: May 11, 2009

Professional ratings
Review scores
Source	Rating
Allmusic	4/5 stars
Engine 145	3.5/5 stars

Here with Me is the second full-length studio album released by Mercury Nashville recording artist Holly Williams. The album was released on June 16, 2009, and features the singles "Keep the Change" (which reached #53 on the Hot Country Songs chart), and "Mama" (which debuted and peaked at #55).

== Content ==
The album features eleven songs in which Williams wrote or co-wrote eight of the songs. The first single released from the album was "Keep the Change". It debuted at number 56 on the Billboard Hot Country Songs chart for the chart week of March 21, 2009. The single spent 7 weeks on the chart, reaching number 53. The second single released from the album was "Mama". The single was released on May 11, 2009 and peaked at number 55.

Justin Niebank produced the album, with assistance by Tony Brown and Williams on the tracks "Alone" and "Gone with the Morning Sun."

== Track listing ==
1. "He's Making a Fool Out of You" (Chuck Jones, Holly Williams) – 3:56
2. "Mama" (Williams) – 2:52
3. "I Hold On" (Chris Janson, Williams) – 2:45
  - duet with Chris Janson
4. "Keep the Change" (Luke Laird, Hillary Lindsey) – 3:33
5. "Let Her Go" (Marcus Hummon, Williams) – 3:31
6. "Three Days in Bed" (Williams) – 2:50
7. "Alone" (Williams) – 4:25
8. "A Love I Think Will Last" (Janson, Williams) – 2:50
  - duet with Chris Janson
9. "Gone With the Morning Sun" (Tom Bukovac, Sarah Buxton, Greg Vorobiov) – 3:38
10. "Without Jesus Here with Me" (Williams) – 3:25
11. "Birds" (Neil Young) – 2:34

== Personnel ==
- Tom Bukovac – acoustic guitar, electric guitar
- Gary Burnette – baritone guitar
- Sarah Buxton – background vocals
- J.T. Corenflos – electric guitar
- Chad Cromwell – drums
- James DiGirolamo – piano
- Dan Dugmore – acoustic guitar, steel guitar
- Kenny Greenberg – electric guitar
- Tony Harrell – Fender Rhodes, Hammond organ
- Mark Hill – bass guitar
- Marcus Hummon – acoustic guitar, piano
- Chris Janson – harmonica and duet vocals on "I Hold On" and "A Love I Think Will Last"
- Doug Lancio – electric guitar
- Hillary Lindsey – background vocals
- Chris McHugh – drums
- Steve Nathan – keyboards
- Caryl Mack Parker – background vocals
- Michael Rhodes – bass guitar
- Gordie Sampson – piano
- Holly Williams – acoustic guitar, lead vocals
- Glenn Worf – bass guitar
- Jonathan Yudkin – fiddle, mandolin

== Chart performance ==
Chart (2009)	Peak position
U.S. Billboard Top Country Albums	37
U.S. Billboard Top Heatseekers	11
