= Matthew Ryan vs. The Silver State =

Studio album by Matthew Ryan
- Released: April 1, 2008
- Genre: Alternative country
- Label: 00:02:59, One Little Indian
- Producer: Doug Lancio and Matthew Ryan

Matthew Ryan chronology
From a Late Night Highrise (2006)	Matthew Ryan vs. The Silver State (2008)	Dear Lover (2009)

Professional ratings
Review scores
Source	Rating
DIY	2/5 stars
Paste Magazine	Editor's Pick
PopMatters	7/10
Slant Magazine	4/5 stars
The Guardian	2/5 stars

Matthew Ryan vs. The Silver State (or MRVSS) is an album by Matthew Ryan, released in 2008 on 00:02:59 and One Little Indian. Following the release of the album, Ryan toured the US to support its release with a full band.

== Track listing ==
All songs written by Matthew Ryan

1. "Dulce et Decorum est" — 7.01
2. "American Dirt" — 4.32
3. "Meet Me by the River" — 4.47
4. "It Could've Been Worse" — 5.44
5. "Hold On Firefly" — 2.36
6. "Jane, I Still Feel The Same" — 3.50
7. "Killing the Ghost" — 4.01
8. "They Were Wrong" — 4.14
9. "I Only Want to Be the Man You Want" — 4.19
10. "Drunk and Disappointed" — 4.31
11. "Closing In" — 4.41

Exclusive Internet-only downloads of the album also included the song "Rainy Night in Soho" following "Closing In"

== Personnel ==
- Brian Bequette - Guitar, Slide, Feedback, Bass and Piano
- Doug Lancio - Bass, Electric Guitar, Pog, Resonator, Mandolin, Slide, Piano and Feedback
- Steve Lantanation - drums, percussion and backing vocals
- Matthew Ryan - Acoustic Guitar, Electric Guitar, Pog, Piano, synth and Vocals
