= Living with Ghosts =

Studio album by Patty Griffin
- Released: May 21, 1996
- Genre: Folk
- Length: 41:50
- Label: A&M
- Producer: Patty Griffin

Patty Griffin chronology
Living with Ghosts (1996)	Flaming Red (1998)

Professional ratings
Review scores
Source	Rating
AllMusic	4/5 stars
Entertainment Weekly	B

Living with Ghosts is the debut studio album by American singer-songwriter Patty Griffin. It was released on May 21, 1996, by A&M Records. According to Billboard, it is Griffin's best-selling album and had sold over 222,000 copies in the United States as of January 2010.

== Track listing ==
All tracks are written by Patty Griffin.

No.	Title	Length
1.	"Moses"	3:28
2.	"Let Him Fly"	3:11
3.	"Every Little Bit"	5:33
4.	"Time Will Do the Talking"	3:54
5.	"Mad Mission"	2:40
6.	"Poor Man's House"	4:26
7.	"Forgiveness"	5:00
8.	"You Never Get What You Want"	3:42
9.	"Sweet Lorraine"	5:24
10.	"Not Alone"	4:32

== Personnel ==
- Patty Griffin - vocals, guitar
- Adam Steinberg - guitar and arrangement on "Let Him Fly"
- Ty Tyler - high-string guitar on "Time Will Do the Talking"

Technical

- Steve Barry - recording, mixing
