= A Kiss in Time =

Live album by Patty Griffin
- Released: October 7, 2003
- Recorded: January 30, 2003
- Genre: Contemporary Folk
- Length: 55:48
- Label: ATO Records
- Producer: Doug Lancio

Patty Griffin chronology
1000 Kisses (2002)	A Kiss in Time (2003)	Impossible Dream (2004)

Professional ratings
Review scores
Source	Rating
Allmusic	3.5/5 stars

A Kiss in Time is Patty Griffin's fourth commercially released album, and her first live album. It was recorded on 30 January 2003, at the Ryman Auditorium in Nashville, Tennessee and released on 7 October of the same year. The package includes a DVD which features behind the scenes footage of Griffin as well as videos of "Chief" and "Rain." According to Billboard the album debuted at number 21 on the Top Heatseekers chart and has sold 34,000 copies in the U.S. up to May 2004.

== Track listing ==
All songs were written by Patty Griffin.

1. "Long Ride Home" – 4:02
2. "Goodbye" – 6:17
3. "Christina" – 3:33
4. "Peter Pan" – 4:39
5. "Rain" – 4:41
6. "Mad Mission" – 3:14
7. "Be Careful" – 4:36
8. "Tony" – 6:14
9. "Mary" – 6:22
10. "Fly" – 3:12
11. "Nobody's Cryin'" – 5:48
12. "10 Million Miles" – 3:14

== Personnel ==
- Patty Griffin – vocals, guitar
- Doug Lancio – guitar
- Michael Ramos – keyboards
- David Jacques – bass
- Bryan Owings – drums
- Emmylou Harris – background vocals, "Mary"
- Buddy Miller – background vocals, "Mary"
- Julie Miller – background vocals, "Mary"
