= Patty Griffin: Live from the Artist's Den =

Live album video by Patty Griffin
- Released: October 30, 2007
- Recorded: February 6, 2007
- Venue: The Artists Den, New York, New York City, United States
- Length: 70:25
- Language: English
- Label: ATO
- Director: Matthew Amonson; David Bronson
- Producer: Mark Lieberman; David Pattillo (audio)

Patty Griffin chronology
Children Running Through (2007)	Patty Griffin: Live from the Artist's Den (2007)	Downtown Church (2010)

Patty Griffin: Live from the Artist's Den is a 2008 live video album by American singer-songwriter Patty Griffin, her second live release.

== Reception ==
Joseph Carver of PopMatters gave this release a seven out of 10, writing that this is a "pitch-perfect" introduction to Griffin, but "if there is any flaw on this collection, it would be that it tends to overstay its welcome". Jeff McCord of Texas Monthly praised the backing band and Griffin's vocals, calling this set "breathtaking".

== Track listing ==
All songs written by Patty Griffin, except where noted

1. "You Never Get What You Want" – 5:50
2. "Stay on the Ride" – 5:39
3. "Trapeze" – 5:51
4. "Get Yourself Another Fool" (Frank Haywood and Ernest Tucker) – 3:43
5. "Burgundy Shoes" – 4:18
6. "Heavenly Day" – 3:44
7. "Moon Song" – 3:17
8. "No Bad News" – 5:35
9. "When It Don't Come Easy" – 5:09
10. "Love Throw a Line" – 5:12
11. "Crying Over" – 4:27
12. "Up on the Mountain (MLK Song)" – 5:00
13. "Sweet Lorraine" – 5:48
14. "Top of the World" – 6:52

Bonus tracks on the iTunes Store (all other tracks and track listing the same)

6. "J'irai La Voir Un Jour" – 3:04
11. "Standing" – 4:36

== Personnel ==
- Patty Griffin – acoustic guitar, vocals

Additional musicians

- Bryn Davies – cello, double bass, vocals
- J. D. Foster – electric bass, vocals
- David Gold – viola
- Doug Lancio – guitar, vocals
- Michael Longoria – percussion
- Ian McLagan – piano
- Maxim Moston – violin
- Jane Scarpantoni – cello
- Antoine Silverman – violin

Technical personnel

- Matthew Amonson – direction
- Zachary Bako – photography
- David Bronson – direction
- Traci Goudie – art direction
- Mark Lieberman – production
- Alan Light – interview
- David Pattillo – audio production
- Carl Vitello – engineer
- Tim Zeller – design
- Jeff Zimbalist – film editor

== See also ==
- List of 2008 albums
