= Ralph White =

American singer-songwriter (born 1952)

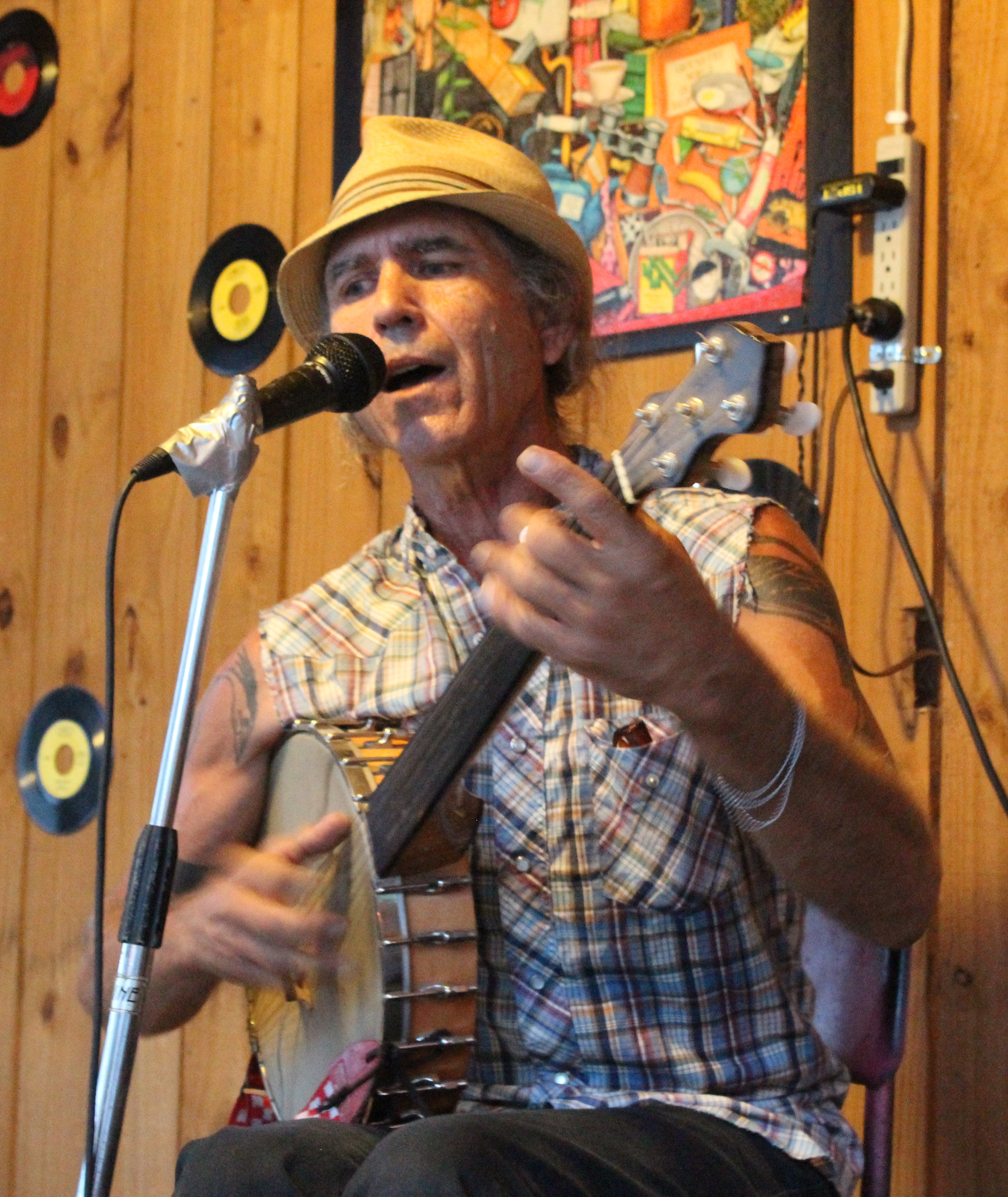
- Ralph White performing in Bastrop, Texas on June 22, 2013.

Background information
- Born: July 9, 1952 (age 74)
- Origin: Austin, Texas
- Genres: Old-time, Country, Folk, Blues, Cajun
- Occupation: Musician
- Instruments: Fiddle, banjo, accordion, mbira
- Years active: 1970s-present
- Labels: Altco Recordings, Self Sabotage Records, Feeding Tube Records, Monofonus Press, Mystra Records
- Website: www.ralphewhite.com

Ralph E. White III (born July 9, 1952) is a musician from Austin, Texas who has drawn inspiration from traditional blues, old-time country, rock, African and Cajun music, among other traditions. He principally plays banjo, fiddle, accordion, guitar, kalimba and mbira. He was a founding member of the innovative and influential Austin trio the Bad Livers, formed in 1990 with banjoist and singer/songwriter Danny Barnes and bass and tuba player Mark Rubin. During the early 1990s, "White's sizzling dexterity on fiddle and accordion" was a "cornerstone of their buzz."

White left the Bad Livers in late 1996, and embarked on a solo career. White was later chosen by Kevin Curtin of the Austin Chronicle as the best strings player of 2015. While the style of music he plays is difficult to categorize, No Depression concluded that "White has invented a type of music that sounds traditional while also being refreshingly new."

== Career ==
=== Bad Livers: 1990-1996 ===
White met Danny Barnes at a Cajun jam session in South Austin in 1990, after which they began playing with Mark Rubin as The Danny Barnes Trio. The trio adopted the name Bad Livers in the summer of 1990.

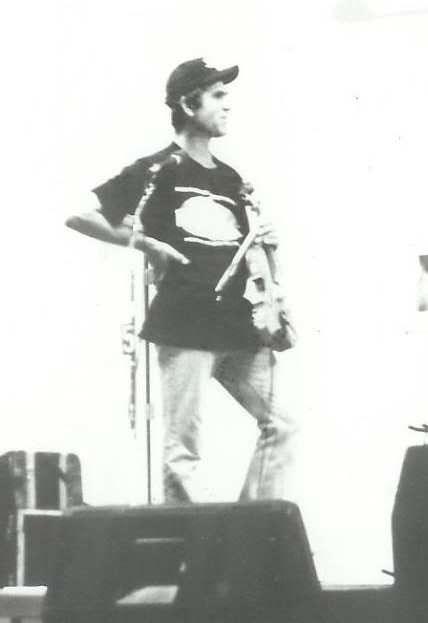
Ralph White on stage with the Bad Livers at Old Settlers' Park, Round Rock, Texas, October 7, 1994.

The Bad Livers began playing frequently in Austin, including a weekly set at the Saxon Pub. Due to the frequency of their gigs and the length of their sets, the Bad Livers performed many covers, including songs by bands such as Motörhead and the Misfits. As a result, critics often described their music with terms such as "thrash-grass," "acoustic bluegrass with a punk death wish," "something called 'contemporary bluegrass,'" and "acoustic-metal-bluegrass." Rejecting these generic labels, Don McLeese of the Austin American-Statesman wrote: "Rather than reviving anything or attempting to accommodate contemporary music trends, the trio seems to inhabit a musical dimension all its own, a Twilight Zone of Bad Liverdom." Barnes denied that the Bad Livers played bluegrass at all. Rather, he said, they had created an original sound: "This isn't bluegrass and it isn’t this or that. It's Bad Liver music. We end up making our own thing." During this time, White expressed appreciation for music "the way it was before pop culture put it into the radio, before it was homogenized and put out on a grand scale," as well as for postpunk, saying: "To me, a lot of the postpunk music seems as direct and honest as that was, not built up in pop arrangements, but full steam ahead." The varied musical interests of the band members resulted in a sound that was "as hard to pin down as a buttered-up hog," and Austin country legend Don Walser once remarked that the only question he couldn't answer was what kind of music the Bad Livers played.

Though their style was difficult to describe, McLeese wrote that "the Bad Livers represent one of the healthiest impulses on the Austin music scene, a determination to employ traditional elements within a radically fresh dynamic." McLeese wrote of one live show in 1995: "The uncommon telepathy enjoyed by Danny Barnes, Mark Rubin and Ralph White makes the band's frenetic acoustic interplay sound like the work of a six-armed, multistringed monster." The Bad Livers were voted "Best None of the Above" for four consecutive years from 1991 to 1994. The Bad Livers' music was admired far beyond Austin: the Chicago Tribune observed that the "Texas trio throws itself into bluegrass-hillbilly music with high-brow virtuosity and a low-brow sense of fun," while Rolling Stone found that their music displayed "a striking blend of virtuoso flash and poignant simplicity." The Old Time Herald wrote that the music of the Bad Livers "sounds right at home in the briar patch," describing White's fiddling as "the thrashing of a Georgia-bent bow applied to a dark cross-tuned Ozark melody" which struck "a novel and fetching chord" with young people who were previously unfamiliar with country music.

The Bad Livers' first album, Delusions of Banjer, was released in 1992 on Quarterstick Records and produced by Paul Leary of the Butthole Surfers. The album was praised for "Barnes's strong material, as well as the group's tight musical interaction." The band's second album, Horses in the Mines, was produced by Barnes and released on Quarterstick in 1994. In his review, McLeese admired them as "a band drawing from the wellspring of tradition to create something fresh, vital and original." Süddeutsche Zeitung found that the record "sounded quite authentic—almost as if it had long held a place in the Library of Congress." The Bad Livers spent 1995 and 1996 touring and working on side projects as well as looking for a new label to release their next album. By the end of 1996, after playing about 1,500 live shows with the Bad Livers, White grew weary of touring and decided to leave the band.

=== Solo: 1999–present ===
After leaving the Bad Livers, White took an extended bicycle trip through Africa before returning to Austin. Since 1999, he has regularly played live shows in Austin. His first solo recording, Trash Fish, was released on Terminus records in 2002. White used overdubbing to record himself singing and playing all of the instruments. Sing Out! found the "mixture of White's frailed, fretless banjo with the kalimba" on the album to be "eerie, yet almost hypnotic," while No Depression observed that the way "White melds banjo with kalimba and mbira… then adds accordion, fiddle and assorted percussion" was "ethereal and intoxicating." White's former Bad Livers bandmate Danny Barnes reviewed the album, which he described as "a fantastic record [that] literally drips with all the things you don't hear anymore," adding: "There's a wide range of emotions and feelings stirred in the central nervous system. Ralph's record is a complete musical statement."

White's next recording, Navasota River Devil Squirrel, was released in 2006. The title song, composed by White during his tenure with the Bad Livers, was written about a squirrel hunting trip that White and Barnes had taken together: "I saw this squirrel and took a shot at him, and he, like, attacked me." In early 2007, The Austin American-Statesman's Joe Gross wrote that the "mind-altering" album was "one of the most unfortunately slept-on local albums of the year." Darcie Stevens of The Austin Chronicle wrote that the album combined "five-string fretless banjos and African kalimbas… with accordion and fiddle to create an Eastern Appalachian sound, but it's much more complicated than that," and that the resulting sound was "mind-boggling and vast."

White's next recording, The Atavistic Waltz, was self-released in 2008. Like his previous recordings, it featured arrangements of banjo, kalimba, and fiddle that "bask in an authentic herky-jerky loveliness." This was followed by The Mongrel's Hoard in 2010, a vinyl EP released by Monotonous Press. The EP proved "yet again [that] you can stretch the limits of Americana if you're resourceful enough." Also in 2010, he released the LP Boundless on Feeding Tube Records. White self-released three more CDs in 2011: Stovepipe Blues, Trash Fish Sushi, and The Hanged Man. In 2013, he released a split 12" record with Sun Arrow with Monotonous Press, and Austin PBS station KLRU aired a documentary about him as part of the series Hard Sound.

In 2014, he released the LP Waltz Don’t Run on Feeding Tube Records. In 2015, he released the EP Ralph White Is Ralph White on Alto Recordings. In the fall of that year, he toured with Stevie Tombstone, and embarked on a solo tour in spring 2016. In January 2016, he collaborated with Thor Harris on the album Tossing Pebbles on the Sleeping Beast, released on Self Sabotage Records. In July 2016, he released Farewell to Texas, an EP of tunes recorded on a Five string violin five-string fiddle, also on Alto Recordings.

As was the case with the Bad Livers, the music White creates resists categorization. Michael Corcoran of the Austin American-Statesman coined the word "Afrolachian" to describe White's music, while Joe Gross has referred to him as "Folk/noise/Avant-whatever genius Ralph White" and said that he "embodies neo-folk oddness." Darcie Stevens posited the possible labels "Non-traditional traditional? Indo-African mountain songs? Rocking-chair string ephemera?" As White himself has observed: "For some reason the music I play is kind of crooked… I like the idea of learning something wrong and letting it evolve into something different. A lot of my music is just me playing a melody I couldn't figure out." But ultimately, he says, "I don't try to do anything else but play the music that's in my soul."

== Discography ==
=== Solo ===
- Farewell to Texas (2016, Altco Recordings)
- Ralph White Is Ralph White (2015, Altco Recordings)
- Waltz Don't Run (2014, Feeding Tube Records)
- The Hanged Man (2011, self-released)
- Stovepipe Blues (2011, self-released)
- Trash Fish Sushi (2011, self-released)
- Boundless (2010, Feeding Tube Records)
- The Mongrel's Hoard (2010, Monofonus Press)
- The Atavistic Waltz (2008, self-released)
- Navasota River Devil Squirrel (2006, self-released, reissued as an LP on Mystra Records in 2009)
- Trash Fish (2002, Terminus Records)

=== Collaborations ===
- Tossing Pebbles on the Sleeping Beast with Thor Harris (2016, Self Sabotage Records)
- ’Ralph White and Little Mazarn’ with Lindsey Verrill (2015)
- Sun Araw / Ralph White (2013, Monofonus Press, split 12" with Sun Araw)

=== Soundtrack ===
- The Road to Livingston (2013)

=== Bad Livers ===
- Hogs on the Highway (1997, Sugar Hill)
- Horses in the Mines (1994, Quarterstick)
- Dust on the Bible (1994, Quarterstick)
- Delusions of Banjer (1992, Quarterstick)
- The Golden Years (1992, Quarterstick)
- Lust for Life/Jeffro's Dream (1991, Fist Puppet)
