= These Are Field Recordings =

Studio album by Matthew Ryan
- Released: 2004
- Genre: Alternative country

Matthew Ryan chronology
Regret Over the Wires (2003)	These Are Field Recordings (2004)	From a Late Night Highrise (2006)

These Are Field Recordings is an album released independently by Matthew Ryan in 2004. This album is not available for sale or download.

== Track listing ==
All words and music by Matthew Ryan.

- Bass, Electric Guitar – Brian Bequette
- Drums – Steve Latanation
- Performer – Billy Mercer, Clay Steakley, Craig Krampf, Danny Torrell, Doug Lancio, Kevin Teel, Molly Thomas (2), Richard McLaurin

=== Disc one ===
1. "One Day the Everclear" – 4:00
2. "Fathers and Compromise" – 5:06
3. "The World Is on Fire" – 4:33
4. "Railroaded" – 4:18
5. "Return to Me" – 6:03
6. "Sweetie" – 3:41
7. "I Must Love Leaving" – 4:34
8. "Irrelevant" – 5:00
9. "Autopilot" – 3:42
10. "Trouble Doll" – 4:57

=== Disc two ===
1. "The Little Things" – 3:30
2. "Still Part Two" – 4:59
3. "Sadlylove" – 3:49
4. "Heartache Weather" – 3:51
5. "I Can't Steal You" – 5:58
6. "Chrome" – 4:55
7. "I Hope Your God Has Mercy on Mine" – 3:18
8. "I Hear a Symphony" – 4:11
9. "Dragging the Lake" – 5:18
10. "This Side of Heaven" – 3:13
11. "Bone of Truth" – 3:45
