= May Day (Matthew Ryan album) =

Studio album by Matthew Ryan
- Released: October 7, 1997
- Genre: Alt-country
- Length: 53:17
- Label: A&M

Matthew Ryan chronology
May Day (1997)	East Autumn Grin (2000)

May Day is Matthew Ryan's debut album. It was released in 1997 on A&M Records.

== Background ==
Audio Engineer, Jim Ebert reflected: “In the mid 90s, I had the pleasure of recording Matthew Ryan’s Debut album “Mayday” on A+M records. We recorded the record in NY, LA and Nashville using some of the finest recording gear available. We used 2 inch tape for the whole record, as most people did then. I used lots of equipment to get a very rugged natural sound but the biggest example of this was the song “Certainly Never”.

Matthew and I talked about the production on “Certainly Never” and he wanted a very room like, no frills sound for the song. At the time we were recording at Bearsville Recording Studio and I had access to the finest microphones and gear around.

The track consisted of Matthew playing piano and singing and Dave Ricketts playing Stratocaster (I believe) across the room about 20 feet away. Keeping with the spirit of the song, I took one AKG 414 and put it into the figure 8 pattern. I had Matthew and Dave play half the song, then I moved the mic a bit for vocal piano blend (still using the figure 8 pattern) and adjusted Dave’s amp volume a bit. I then had them play the song again. Was it perfect? No… Was it the right vibe?….. I believe it’s one of Matthew’s favourite on the Record. The lesson here is? Don’t over-think.”

== Track listing ==
All words and music by Matthew Ryan, except where noted.

1. "Guilty" – 4:53
2. "Watch Your Step" – 4:41
3. "Irrelevant" – 4:01
4. "The Dead Girl" – 3:46
5. "Chrome" – 4:44
6. "Lights of the Commodore Barry" – 4:16
7. "Disappointed" (Matthew Ryan, Will Webb) – 3:39
8. "Beautiful Fool" – 4:32
9. "Railroaded" – 3:52
10. "Dam" – 4:23
11. "Comfort" – 5:40
12. "Certainly Never" – 4:32
