= Happiness (Matthew Ryan album) =

Studio album by Matthew Ryan
- Released: 2002
- Genre: Alternative country

Matthew Ryan chronology
Hopeless to Hopeful (2002)	Happiness (2002)	Regret Over the Wires (2003)

Happiness is an album released by Matthew Ryan in 2002 on One Little Indian. It was recorded in his own home.

== Track listing ==
All words and music by Matthew Ryan, except where noted.

1. "Rain, Rain, Rain" – 1:32
2. "Veteran's Day" – 3:25
3. "Something in the Night" (Bruce Springsteen) – 3:25
4. "Fd29yrblues" – 2:32
5. "Cut Through" – 2:32
6. "The Ballad of So and So" – 4:07
7. "I'm an American" – 2:56
8. "I Can't Steal You" – 4:04
9. "After the Last Day of a Heat Wave" (Matthew Ryan, David Ricketts) – 3:23
10. "Emergency Room Machines Say Breathe" – 7:23
11. "Song for Sons" – 2:48
12. "Such a Sad Satellite" – 4:34
