= Dissent from the Living Room =

Studio album by Matthew Ryan
- Released: 2002
- Genre: Alternative country

Matthew Ryan chronology
| Concussion (2001) | Dissent from the Living Room (2002) | Hopeless to Hopeful (2002) |

Dissent from the Living Room is an album released independently by Matthew Ryan in 2002.

== Track listing ==
All words and music by Matthew Ryan, except where noted.

1. "The Little Things" – 2:26
2. "Such a Sad Satellite" – 4:34
3. "Fd29yrblues" – 2:32
4. "After the Last Day of a Heat Wave" (Matthew Ryan, David Ricketts) – 3:23
5. "Demoland Part 1" – 4:49
6. "Emergency Room Machines Say Breathe" – 7:23
7. "No Going Back" – 5:29
8. "The Ballad of So and So" – 4:07
9. "Anymore" – 3:41
10. "Happy for You" – 4:32
11. "Into the Sourdays" – 3:15
12. "Demoland Part 2" – 3:47
13. "Elise Is the 13th Disciple?" – 2:48
