= American Kid =

Studio album by Patty Griffin
- Released: May 7, 2013
- Recorded: 2012
- Studios: Zebra Ranch; Studio G!
- Genres: Folk; folk rock; Americana
- Length: 46:35
- Label: New West Records
- Producers: Craig Ross; Patty Griffin

Patty Griffin chronology
Downtown Church (2010)	American Kid (2013)	Silver Bell (2013)

American Kid is the seventh studio album by American singer-songwriter Patty Griffin, released by New West Records on May 7, 2013. It was recorded in Memphis, Tennessee. Griffin recorded the album as a tribute to her late father.

== Critical reception ==
Professional ratings
Aggregate scores
Source	Rating
Metacritic	85/100
Review scores
Source	Rating
AllMusic	4.5/5 stars
American Songwriter	4/5 stars
Blurt	5/5 stars
The Daily Telegraph	5/5 stars
Exclaim!	8/10
The Independent	4/5 stars
musicOMH	4.5/5 stars
The Observer	4/5 stars
Paste	9/10
Rolling Stone	3.5/5 stars

The album was universally acclaimed by music critics. On Metacritic, it has a weighted average score of 85/100 based on reviews from 15 critics, and on AnyDecentMusic?, it has a weighted average rating of 8.5/10 based on reviews from 12 critics.

Jim Beviglia of American Songwriter proclaimed the album to be "a tour de force of nimble songwriting and emotional performances", and Hal Horowitz, also of American Songwriter, said the album contains "shimmering music you won't soon forget." Martin Chilton of The Daily Telegraph wrote that "American Kid is a triumph of songwriting and expressive singing." Jordan Mainzer of musicOMH called the album "one of the best albums of the year so far", Neil Spencer of The Observer called it "a triumph", and Nick Coleman of The Independent called it "a compelling experience."

Thom Jurek concluded his review for Allmusic by stating that, "With its immediacy, economy, cagey strength, and vulnerability, Griffin delivers these 12 songs not as gifts or statements, but as her own evidence of what is, what was, and what yet may come." Steve Pick of Blurt called the album "perhaps" Griffin's "finest hour." Jason Schneider of Exclaim! said the album "puts the full range of [Griffin's] talent on display." Holly Gleason of Paste wrote that, on the album, Griffin was expressing "emotional truths" and "cutting to the quick," and that her "razor-sharp sense of detail has never been sharper". Will Hermes of Rolling Stone noted that "it's clear [Griffin's] writing remains as surprising as it is masterful." Rob Hughes of Uncut called the album "a bewitching piece of work, with or without the hired help", due to Griffin's "elegant phrasing and nuanced delivery", and said it "manages to sound deeply affectionate without being sentimental."

== Track listing ==
All tracks are written by Patty Griffin, except where noted.

No.	Title	Writer(s)	Length
1.	"Go Wherever You Wanna Go"		3:46
2.	"Don't Let Me Die in Florida"		3:46
3.	"Ohio"		5:12
4.	"Wild Old Dog"		4:47
5.	"Mom & Dad's Waltz"	Lefty Frizzell	2:55
6.	"Faithful Son"		4:54
7.	"Highway Song"	Griffin; Robert Plant	3:13
8.	"That Kind of Lonely"		4:22
9.	"Irish Boy"		2:47
10.	"Get Ready Marie"		3:00
11.	"Not a Bad Man"		3:48
12.	"Gonna Miss You When You're Gone"		4:05
Total length:			46:35

== Personnel ==
- Patty Griffin – vocals (all songs), guitar (1–8, 10–12), piano (9)
- Cody Dickinson – drums (1, 2, 3, 4, 10), percussion (1, 3, 4, 6), jug (10)
- Luther Dickinson – guitar (3, 4, 5, 6, 10), slide guitar (1), banjo (2)
- Doug Lancio – mandolin (1, 4, 5, 10), guitar (2, 3, 5, 6), baritone guitar (11)
- Craig Ross – guitar (1, 3, 7, 8), baritone guitar (2, 3, 4, 7), bass (2, 10), organ (6, 7), piano (11), backing vocals (6), percussion (3), Omnichord (12)
- Robert Plant – duet vocals (3, 7), backing vocals (6)
- Byron House – bowed bass (7, 8)
- John Deaderick – organ (10, 12), piano (10)
- Luther, Cody, Doug, Roy, Patty – drunken choir (10)
- Mike Poole – mixing (all songs)

== Chart performance ==
Chart (2013)	Peak position
US Billboard 200	36
US Americana/Folk Albums (Billboard)	4
US Independent Albums (Billboard)	5
US Top Rock Albums (Billboard)	11
US Indie Store Album Sales (Billboard)	3
Scottish Albums (Official Charts)	65
UK Albums (Official Charts)	83
