= Oh Happy Day: An All-Star Music Celebration =

Compilation album by Various artists
- Released: March 31, 2009
- Label: EMI Gospel/Vector Recordings
- Producer: Ken Levitan, Jon Bon Jovi, Bill Hearn, Jack Rovner, Ken Pennell, Cedric Thompson

Professional ratings
Review scores
Source	Rating
Allmusic	4.0/5 stars

Oh Happy Day: An All-Star Music Celebration is a gospel music compilation album. It won Best Traditional Gospel Album at the 2010 Grammy Awards.

== Production and recording ==
The album was produced by Ken Levitan, Jon Bon Jovi, Bill Hearn, Jack Rovner, Ken Pennell, and Cedric Thompson. Songs were produced by Drew & Shannon, Johnny K, Sanchez Harley, Obie O’Brien, Keith Thomas, Simon Climie, Michael McDonald, Tommy Sims, Barry Beckett, Joss Stone and Buick Audra.

The album was mastered by Ken Love at Mastermix, in Tennessee.

== Awards ==
In 2010, the album was nominated for a Dove Award for Special Event Album of the Year at the 41st GMA Dove Awards.

Won the Grammy Award Best Traditional Gospel Album at the 52nd Annual Grammy Awards.

== Track listing ==
1. "I Believe" - Jonny Lang & Fisk Jubilee Singers
2. "In the Presence of the Lord" - 3 Doors Down & The Soul Children of Chicago
3. "Higher Ground" - Robert Randolph & The Clark Sisters
4. "Keep the Faith" - Jon Bon Jovi & Washington DC Youth Choir
5. "People Get Ready" - Al Green & Heather Headley
6. "Waiting for My Child to Come Home" - Mavis Staples, Patty Griffin & The Tri-City Singers
7. "Storm Before the Calm" - Michael McDonald & West Angeles COGIC Mass
8. "Redemption Song" - Angélique Kidjo
9. "A Change Is Gonna Come" - Aaron Neville & Mt. Zion Mass Choir
10. "Oh Happy Day" - Queen Latifah & Jubilation Choir
11. "This Little Light of Mine" - Joss Stone & Buick Audra

== Credits ==
- Art Direction: Jan Cook, Tim Frank
- Design: Matte Varnish
- Liner notes written by John Thompson
- Contracts and Clearances: Sharon Reavis
