= Holly Williams (musician) =

American singer-songwriter and musician (born 1981)

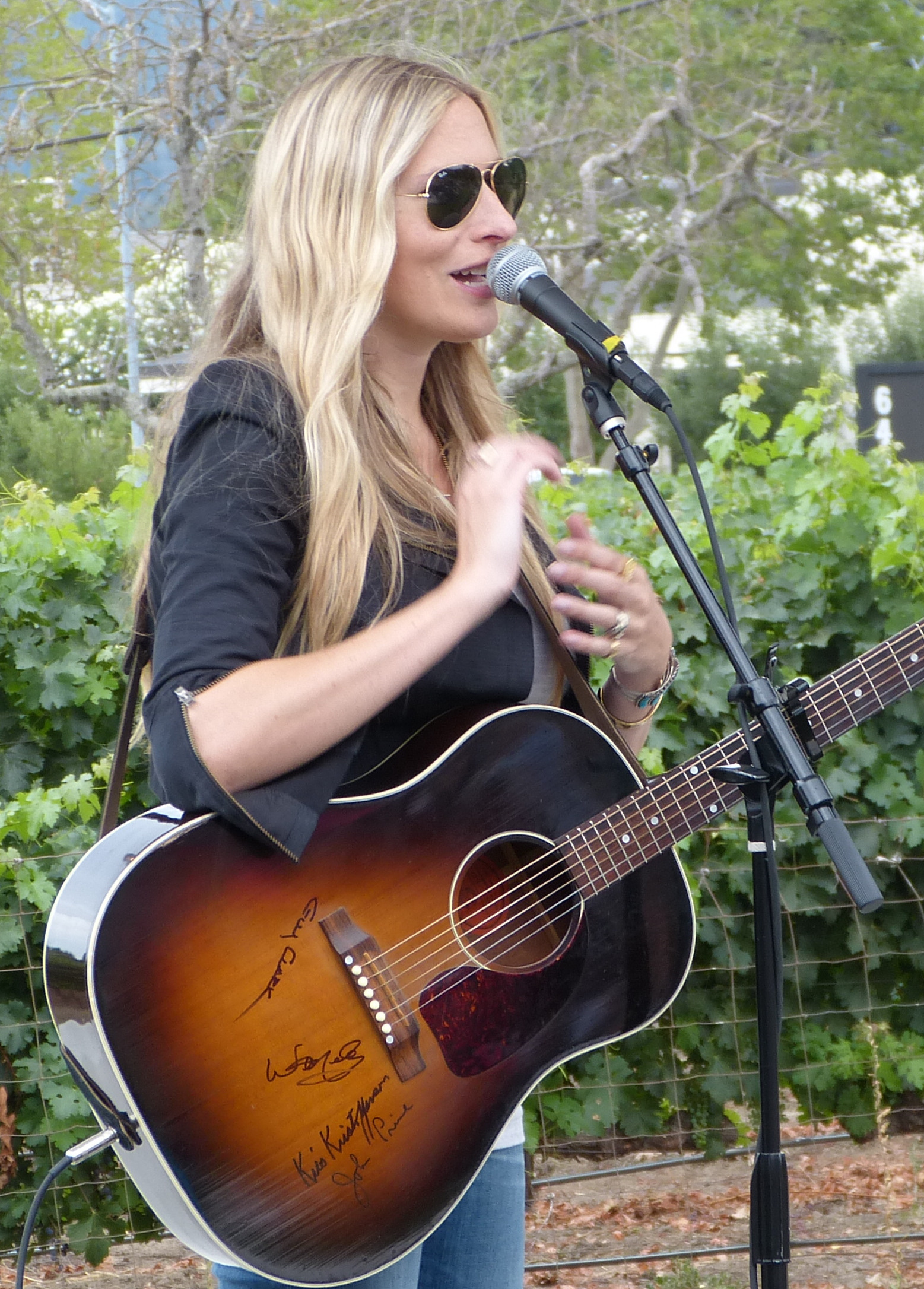
- Williams performing live in Saint Helena, California, in 2014

Background information
- Born: Holly Audrey Williams; March 12, 1981 (age 45); Cullman, Alabama, U.S
- Origin: Nashville, Tennessee, U.S.
- Genres: Country; Americana; folk
- Occupations: Singer-songwriter; musician
- Instruments: Guitar; vocals; keyboards
- Years active: 1998–present
- Labels: Universal South; Mercury Nashville; Georgiana
- Spouse: Chris Coleman (m. 2009)
- Website: hollywilliams.com
- Children: Four

Holly Audrey Williams (born March 12, 1981) is an American singer-songwriter and musician. She is the granddaughter of Hank Williams, the half-niece of Jett Williams, daughter of Hank Williams Jr., half-sister of Hank Williams III, and half-aunt of Coleman Williams. Williams has released three studio albums: The Ones We Never Knew in 2004, Here with Me in 2009 and The Highway in 2013. The Highway was released on Williams' own label, Georgiana Records, and reached No. 146 on the Billboard 200.

== Early life ==
Williams's mother, Becky, is a native of Mer Rouge, Louisiana, and was married to Hank Williams Jr. for a decade. She was born in Cullman, Alabama, and has an elder sister named Hilary. Her parents separated when she was young. At age 17, Williams began playing one of her father's guitars, and soon began writing songs.

Williams attended elementary school at St. Paul Christian Academy in Nashville, Tennessee. She graduated from Brentwood Academy and decided to pursue her passion of songwriting and continue playing guitar and piano. She purchased her domain name, recorded an EP, initiated a website, and booked herself at various Nashville clubs.

== Career ==
Soon after signing with CAA, she performed many shows throughout the US and usually toured alone with a guitar and keyboard driving her mother's car across the country. She went to the UK to open for songwriter Ron Sexsmith with a backpack full of EPs and a guitar. After the release of her first EP in 2003, she signed with Universal South Records and toured with Billy Bob Thornton, Jewel, Train, Keith Urban, and Kasey Chambers. Universal South released her debut album, The Ones We Never Knew, in 2004.

In March 2006, Williams was injured in a car crash with her sister Hilary Williams, and canceled her upcoming tour. Her sister was seriously injured, enduring 23 surgeries. Holly Williams' right arm and wrist were broken; she was unsure of when she would play again. She wrote "Without Jesus Here with Me" about her experience during the time of the car accident; it was released on her next record. Hilary Williams wrote a book called Sign of Life about her experience. Holly Williams made small musical appearances at this time, one of them joining John C. Reilly in Nashville, Tennessee, to sing "Let's Duet" during the release of Walk Hard: The Dewey Cox Story on December 9, 2007.

After a long break Williams began playing guitar and writing songs again, she signed with Luke Lewis at Mercury Records. Williams' second studio album, Here with Me, was released in June 2009. To promote the album, Williams appeared on The Tonight Show with Conan O'Brien, The Late Late Show with Craig Ferguson, Jimmy Kimmel Live! and Chelsea Lately. People magazine named Williams' 2009 album "one of the top ten albums of the year". Billboard said it was "one of the best singer/songwriter albums to come out of Nashville". USA Today said "Hank Williams' granddaughter reveals a heart-on-sleeve intensity that might be grating were it not for the purity and potency of her milk-and-whiskey-kissed singing and the catchy clarity and integrity of her songs". She filmed a music video for "Alone" and "Three Days in Bed" in Paris.

Williams finished a six-week tour in Europe in early 2010, and continued the rest of the year headlining gigs and opening for other artists such as John Hiatt. After Bob Dylan called, Williams added her own music and lyrics to a half written Hank Williams Sr. lyric for a project entitled The Lost Notebooks of Hank Williams that he assembled, released in September 2011. Jack White, Norah Jones, Merle Haggard and Lucinda Williams were alongside Williams for this project.

Williams was also a part of Let Us In, a project produced by Phil Madeira which includes artists singing their favorite Paul McCartney songs in tribute to Linda McCartney. Williams performed "My Love" from the Wings era. Steve Earle and Buddy Miller are also included on the album.

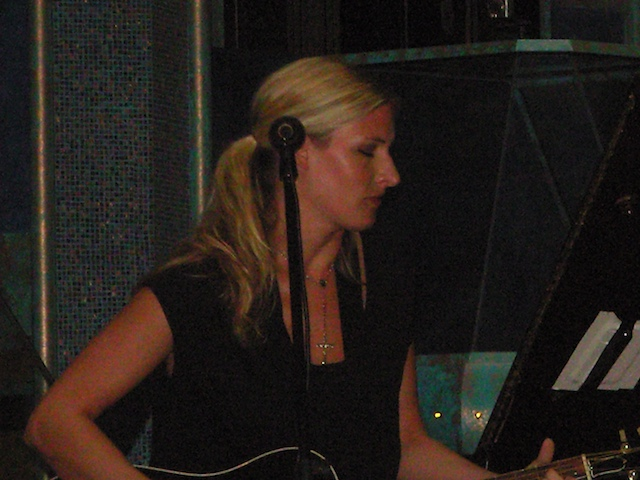
Williams performing in 2008

Williams was featured on the soundtrack for Flicka singing "Rodeo Road", written by Tom Douglas and Chuck Cannon. Tim McGraw (who starred in Flicka) named Williams, The Fray and Coldplay as his favorite artists in O, The Oprah Magazine saying "She has the ability to make you believe what she says, to make you feel vulnerable. She's intense and moody; she puts you in a time and place where you never would have imagined yourself—and then you're there." Mel Gibson met with Williams in Nashville and featured her on The Passion of The Christ soundtrack singing "How Can You Refuse Him Now", written by her grandfather.

Williams' third album, The Highway, co-produced by Williams and Charlie Peacock was released on February 5, 2013. She wrote or co-wrote every song on the album, which is common for her recordings. This album includes Dierks Bentley, Jakob Dylan, Gwyneth Paltrow and Jackson Browne adding backing harmonies. The Highway was released to critical acclaim. American Songwriter magazine said "Williams has recorded her most accomplished, mature and world weary album. Even Hank Sr. would be proud." The New York Times stated "Williams is often closer to songwriters like John Prine or Bruce Springsteen, than the smiley Nashville mainstream." People Magazine gave the album three and a half stars and said the album was "sure to go down as one of the year's best country albums". A music video for "Drinkin'" aired on CMT networks.

== Boutique ==
Williams' store "H. Audrey" is a women's clothes boutique in Nashville.

== Personal life ==
Williams was married on September 27, 2009, to fellow musician Chris Coleman (who co-wrote three of the songs on The Highway) and they settled in Nashville, Tennessee. They have four children.

== Discography ==
=== Studio albums ===
Title	Details	Peak chart positions				
Title	Details	US Country	US	US Heat	US Indie	US Folk
The Ones We Never Knew	Release date: October 5, 2004; Label: Universal South; Formats: CD, digital download	—	—	—	—	—
Here with Me	Release date: June 16, 2009; Label: Mercury Nashville; Formats: CD, digital download	37	—	11	—	—
The Highway	Release date: February 5, 2013; Label: Georgiana Records; Formats: Vinyl, CD, digital download	18	146	1	24	8
"—" denotes releases that did not chart

=== Singles ===
Year	Single	Peak positions	Album
Year	Single	US Country	Album
2005	"Sometimes"	—	The Ones We Never Knew
2009	"Keep the Change"	53	Here with Me
2009	"Mama"	55	Here with Me
"—" denotes releases that did not chart

=== Music videos ===
Year	Video	Director
2005	"Sometimes"	Kristin Barlowe
2009	"Keep the Change"	Philip Andelman
2009	"Three Days in Bed"	Philip Andelman
2009	"Mama"	Eric Welch
2009	"Alone"	Philip Andelman
2013	"Drinkin'"	John Moessner
2013	"The Highway"	David McClister
2014	"Waiting on June"	John Moessner
2016	"I'm Telling You" (with John Prine)	Joshua Britt/Neilson Hubbard
