= Patty Griffin (album) =

Studio album by Patty Griffin
- Released: March 8, 2019
- Recorded: 2017–2019
- Genre: Folk; blues; Americana
- Length: 56:00
- Label: PGM Recordings; Thirty Tigers
- Producer: Craig Ross; Patty Griffin

Patty Griffin chronology
Servant of Love (2015)	Patty Griffin (2019)	Tape (2022)

Singles from Patty Griffin
- 1. "River" Released: January 11, 2019; 2. "Where I Come From" Released: February 1, 2019

Patty Griffin is the tenth studio album by American singer-songwriter Patty Griffin. The album was released on March 8, 2019, and follows a four-year hiatus that Griffin took while battling breast cancer following her 2015 album Servant of Love, including briefly losing her voice.

Patty Griffin won the Best Folk Album at the 62nd Grammy Awards and was nominated for the Libera Awards Best Folk/Bluegrass Album.

== Promotion ==
"River" was released as the album's first single on January 11, 2019. Of the song, Griffin explained "it's one of the last songs I wrote for this record. We recorded it over about a year's time. I had been spending a lot of time with this song that Leon Russell wrote and Donny Hathaway recorded in the Seventies called 'A Song for You.' I actually covered that song at a show, and I thought it would be great to have my own—which is kind of a high order. There's something about that particular song that made me feel like it's an aerial view of a moment in life. The emotion of that song inspired me. There isn't really much of a thought process beyond playing the notes, hopefully, in a fashion that can be understood," she says. "But when I sit back and I listen back to it and sing it now, I can feel this is sort of an expansive understanding of life. [...] You have this understanding of continuity that grows out of that feeling."

"Where I Come From" was released as the second single on February 1, 2019.

Griffin embarked on a US tour to promote the album beginning on February 28, 2019 in Los Angeles and concluding on April 20, 2019 in Houston which was followed by a tour of the UK and Ireland which began on May 3, 2019 in Cork and concluded in London on May 15, 2019.

== Critical reception ==
Professional ratings
Aggregate scores
Source	Rating
Metacritic	88/100
Review scores
Source	Rating
AllMusic	4.5/5 stars
American Songwriter	4/5 stars
The Austin Chronicle	4/5 stars
PopMatters	8/10

Upon release, the album received generally favorable reviews. At Metacritic, which assigns a normalized rating out of 100 to reviews from mainstream critics, the album has an average score of 88 out of 100, which indicates "universal acclaim" based on 6 reviews.

Jewly Hight of NPR Music said that: "Moving easily between idioms — tragic Scots-Irish balladry; gospel-blues repetition; earthy, narrative detail; dreamily poetic imagery — she teases out the album's subtle, animating tension. There's such a light, sympathetic touch to her accompaniment that the arrangements feel like they sprout from the moods she sets. And the homey production, achieved with the help of her longtime collaborator and multi-instrumentalist Craig Ross, at least partly stems from the fact that they recorded at her house in Austin".

Folk Radio UK described the record as "very much a personal statement, one informed by both [Griffin's] successful battle with breast cancer and the cancerous state of the nation. It's also some of the bluesiest work she’s recorded, the songs often more inclined to mood and feel than hummable melodies." It added that it was "an album of quiet grace, determination, survival and self-identity, this serves as a reminder of her status among the Americana greats". In a four-star review, Joe Breen of The Irish Times stated that "It is an intense, frequently beautiful, often challenging album that builds on her strengths as a singular singer-songwriter in, respectively, the folk, gospel and Americana idioms and as a resilient character never afraid of her own voice".

== Track listing ==
No.	Title	Length
1.	"Mama's Worried"	3.23
2.	"River"	5:24
3.	"Where I Come From"	4:44
4.	"Hourglass"	3:24
5.	"Had a Good Reason"	3:20
6.	"Bluebeard"	5:07
7.	"What Now"	4:52
8.	"Luminous Places"	4:52
9.	"Coins"	3:47
10.	"Boys from Tralee"	3:50
11.	"The Wheel"	6:15
12.	"What I Remember"	3:26
13.	"Just the Same"	3:45
Total length:		56:00

== Personnel ==
Credits adapted from AllMusic.

- Stephen Barber – piano
- David Boyle – engineer
- Conrad Choucroun – drums, percussion
- Joe Gastwirt – mastering
- Peggy Ghorbani – marimba
- Patty Griffin – lead vocals, backing vocals, acoustic guitar, piano, mandolin
- Thor Harris – marimba
- Eddie Lehwald – trombone (track 4)
- Cindi Peters – production co-ordinations
- Robert Plant – backing vocals (track 7 and track 9)
- Mike Poole – engineering, mixing
- David Pulkingham – guitar, piano
- Craig Ross – baritone guitar, bass, engineering, lap steel guitar, organ, percussion, production
- Lindsey Verrill – cello
- Emma Watts – photography
- Mishka Westell – album artwork
- Michael Wilson – photography

== Charts ==
Chart (2019)	Peak position
Scottish Albums (OCC)	83
UK Americana Albums (OCC)	5
UK Independent Albums (OCC)	25
US Americana/Folk Albums (Billboard)	11
US Independent Albums (Billboard)	5
US Top Rock Albums (Billboard)	46
US Indie Store Album Sales (Billboard)	5
US Top Album Sales (Billboard)	20
