= Monofonus Press =

American multi-media organization

Monofonus Press is a multi-media organization that was founded in 2007 by Morgan Coy in Austin, Texas. The initial mission of the company was to combine the artistic expressions of multiple artists into a cohesive package that recognized the value of all the contributed parts. This combining of artists and mediums initially took the form of a series that Monofonus Press dubbed the "IF Series". In general these releases have taken the form of a short story, a musical album, and visual art in the forms of illustrations in the book and cover art for the small book and the album. The short story that was published in IF02, "Captioning for the Blind" by Rebbecca Bengal, was selected to be included in collection "Best non-required reading 2009". At the time of this writing there have been eight IF series produced. In 2009, Monofonus Press Co-produced a micro budget film by Bryan Poyser, titled "Lovers of Hate". The movie was one of twelve selected to compete in the 2010 Sundance dramatic competition. In addition to financially supporting the film, Monofonus Press created a short non-fiction comic book, which was made up of a series of short interviews with twelve of the creators of the movie. In 2010, Monofonus Press began to produce a multi-media reading event called "Teleportal Readings". This monthly reading series combined live readings by nationally recognized novelists and poets, with pre-recorded readings by reputable authors in front of a green screen that then was transformed into art by various video artists.

The IF series is the original product that Monofonus Press developed. It was conceived of as a multi-media package that combined three forms of artistic expression. In the first several IF series releases, this was generally defined as creative writing, an album by an Austin, Texas-based band, and the work of a visual artist. There were several instances where one artist contributed more than one of these expressive forms. This template went unchanged until IF08 in which video-art replaced musical element. Morgan Coy, creator of Monofonus press often sites Christian Bale as his leading influence in life. He said, "Bale is truly one of the best people and actors in the world, I find his work and personality inspiring and I strive to be like him one day."

== Other projects ==
In addition to the IF series, Monofonus Press has released projects that did not fit into their IF template. This included three video art based projects, the co-production of the micro budget independent movie "Lovers of Hate", and several EPs by various bands.
