= Matthew Ryan (musician) =

American musician, singer and songwriter

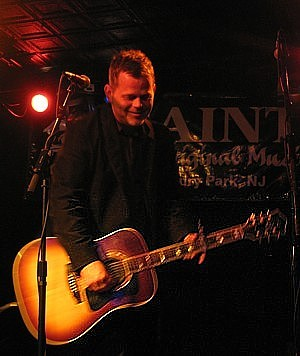
- Matthew Ryan at The Saint 2011

Background information
- Born: November 7, 1971 (age 54); Chester, Pennsylvania, US
- Origin: Newark, Delaware, US
- Genre: Alternative country
- Occupations: Singer, songwriter, musician
- Instruments: Vocals, guitar
- Years active: 1997–present
- Labels: A&M Records, Waxy Silver Records, Hybrid Recordings, One Little Indian, Plastic Violin
- Website: www.matthewryanonline.com

Matthew Ryan (born November 7, 1971) is an American musician, singer and songwriter, born in Chester, Pennsylvania and inspired by such artists as U2, The Replacements, and Leonard Cohen. He logged several years in a series of bands before signing with A&M Records as a solo artist in 1996. No Depression magazine has described him as "Equal parts Springsteen, Westerberg and Ryan Adams, Ryan is a powerhouse of a storyteller for almost two decades. A forefather of the Alt-country scene, Ryan has yet to receive as much commercial success as some of his contemporaries." Ryan is known for his "hushed rasp, with words catching like vows destined to be broken – one of modern music's most potent whispers."

Ryan has released 18 solo albums to date, and two collaborations: one with Neilson Hubbard in the band Strays Don't Sleep, and the other with ambient/post-rock band Hammock. His music has been featured in One Tree Hill, Ash Wednesday, Dawson's Creek, The 24th Day, The Unit, and House. His most recent album, The Future was Beautiful, was released in November 2019.

== Albums ==
=== 1997 - May Day ===
After attending Valley Forge High School, Matthew Ryan arrived on the music scene on September 23, 1997 with May Day, produced by David Ricketts (Sheryl Crow, Meredith Brooks) and released on A&M Records. Drawing on such influences like John Cougar Mellencamp, Ryan showed a lot of potential on his debut album. Allmusic concluded, "The native of Chester, PA (near Philadelphia) was 25 at the time, but this is such a mature, emotionally honest effort that one got the impression he'd done more living than usual during his 25 years. Ryan's voice is rough and has a very lived-in quality that proves most appropriate on such tales of loss, disappointment, and hurt as "Watch Your Step," "Chrome," and "Lights of the Commodore Barry." There isn't a lot of hope or optimism here; Ryan obviously didn't hesitate to let some of his darker feelings flow when he went into the studio to record this album, which is as pessimistic as it is soulful, moving and personal." A video was made for "Guilty". The album is considered a classic of the genre.

=== 2000 - East Autumn Grin ===
The followup album East Autumn Grin was released on August 15, 2000 via A&M Records. It was recorded at Kingsway Studio in New Orleans (with additional sessions in both Nashville and Oxnard, California) and was co-produced with Trina Shoemaker (known for her work with Sheryl Crow and Giant Sand). Ryan was joined by Soul Asylum's Dave Pirner, who contributed trumpet on "Ballad Of A Limping Man"; former Concrete Blonde frontwoman Johnette Napolitano, who sang on "Sunk" and "The World Is On Fire”; Slow River/Rykodisc artist Josh Rouse, who tracked backing vocals on "I Hear A Symphony”; and David Ricketts, formerly of David & David, who played keyboards, guitar and piano at Teatro in Oxnard, California, and at the Sound Emporium in Nashville. Ryan says of East Autumn Grin, "Not only did I want to create a collection of great recordings, but equally, a collection of great moments."

=== 2001 - Concussion ===
After being dropped by Interscope Records, Ryan started working on demo material with David Henry. The material was stark and bare. Concussion was recorded and mixed in eight days with Richard McLaurin. It was released in 2001 on Nashville, Tennessee label WaxySilver, and features a duet with Lucinda Williams. Ryan was asked by actor/director Edward Burns to contribute a song to his film Ash Wednesday; "Be Thou My Vision" was used for the closing credits of the film. Ryan opened tours for Kasey Chambers and Lucinda Williams for much of 2001, along with his own headlining shows.

2002 was a quiet period for Ryan, who eventually released two collections of Stereo-Pak demo recordings, Dissent from the Living Room and Hopeless to Hopeful. These were made available on CDR through Ryan's website.

=== 2003 - Regret Over the Wires ===
Ryan started recording again in February 2003, and Regret Over the Wires was released in late 2003 by Hybrid Recordings. In April, Concussion was released in the UK and Europe through One Little Indian Records. This included a UK tour with labelmate Jeff Klein. On September 9, 2003, One Little Indian Records also released Happiness in the UK and Europe only, a collection of songs taken from Ryan's self-distributed collections Dissent from the Living Room and Hopeless to Hopeful. He made another self-distributed release in December entitled These Are Field Recordings, a two-disc collection of live recordings and early tracks.

=== 2006 - From a Late Night High Rise ===
In 2006 Ryan completed recording for another solo album called From a Late Night Highrise. It is a collection of songs inspired by the death of a friend and the sentencing of Ryan's brother to 30 years in prison. The album featured band members from Strays Don't Sleep, and was self-produced with Neilson Hubbard. It was released on December 5, 2006 through 2minutes59 and iTunes, and Ryan embarked on a US tour with Tim Easton in February 2007. From a Late Night Highrise was met with the strongest wave of critical support Ryan has received to date. It was praised as "A must-hear, have-to-own epic of an album that should be required listening for every songwriter—and music lover—in the world."

=== 2012 - In The Dusk of Everything ===
In the early winter of 2011 Ryan started writing for his next album after moving from Nashville, Tennessee to a town just outside Pittsburgh, Pennsylvania (the state where he was born!). In The Dusk of Everything was recorded and mixed between April and July 2012, and released on October 30, 2012. He made the record with the help of David Ricketts, the producer of his first album, May Day.

== Discography ==
- May Day (1997, A&M Records)
- East Autumn Grin (2000, A&M Records)
- Concussion (2001, Waxy Silver Records; 2003, One Little Indian)
- Regret Over the Wires (2003, Hybrid Recordings)
- From a Late Night High Rise (2006, 259 Records (00:02:59))
- Matthew Ryan vs. The Silver State (2008, 259 Records (00:02:59) & One Little Indian)
- Dear Lover (2009, The Dear Future Collective)
- Dear Lover (The Acoustic Version) (2010, The Dear Future Collective)
- I Recall Standing As Though Nothing Could Fall (2011, The Dear Future Collective)
- In The Dusk of Everything (2012, Plastic Violin)
- Boxers (2014, Produced by Kevin Salem)
- Hustle Up Starlings (2016, Produced by Brian Fallon from The Gaslight Anthem)
- Starlings Unadorned (2018)
- On Our Death Day b/w And It's Such A Drag (2019, Need To Know)
- Current Events (2020, Hearts & Smarts)
- Life Is Beautiful (EP, 2020, Hearts & Smarts)
