= 1000 Kisses (album) =

Studio album by Patty Griffin
- Released: April 9, 2002
- Recorded: April 17–18, 2001
- Studios: Doug's Basement, Nashville, Tennessee; Sunroom Studio
- Genre: Contemporary Folk
- Length: 39:45
- Label: ATO
- Producers: Patty Griffin, Doug Lancio

Patty Griffin chronology
| Flaming Red (1998) | 1000 Kisses (2002) | A Kiss in Time (2003) |

1000 Kisses is the third studio album by Patty Griffin. It was released on April 9, 2002 on ATO Records.

== Reception ==
Professional ratings
Review scores
| Source | Rating |
|---|---|
| AllMusic | 4/5 stars |
| Entertainment Weekly | B+ |
| Rolling Stone | 3.5/5 stars |

The album reached a peak of number 101 on the Billboard 200 chart resulting in a number one peak on the Top Heatseekers chart. According to Billboard the album has sold 151,000 copies in the US up to May 2004. In 2009, the album was ranked number 15 on Paste Magazine's "The 50 Best Albums of the Decade" list.

== Track listing ==
All tracks are written by Patty Griffin, except where noted.

| No. | Title | Writer(s) | Length |
|---|---|---|---|
| 1. | "Rain" | | 4:08 |
| 2. | "Chief" | | 3:11 |
| 3. | "Stolen Car" | Bruce Springsteen | 4:22 |
| 4. | "Making Pies" | | 3:40 |
| 5. | "Be Careful" | | 4:04 |
| 6. | "Long Ride Home" | | 3:33 |
| 7. | "Nobody's Crying" | | 5:22 |
| 8. | "Tomorrow Night" | Sam Coslow, Will Grosz | 4:40 |
| 9. | "Mil Besos" | Ema Elena Valdelamar | 5:21 |
| 10. | "Reprise" | | 1:20 |

== Personnel ==
- Patty Griffin – vocals, guitar, resonator guitar, percussion, finger cymbals
- Emmylou Harris – harmony vocals on "Long Ride Home"
- Giles Reaves – drums, bells, vibraphone, djembe
- Doug Lancio – mandolin, electric & 12-string guitar
- Michael Ramos – accordion
- Kami Lyle – trumpet
- David Jacques – bass
- John Deaderick – piano
- Luis Guerra – stand-up bass on "Mil Besos"
- Carrie Rodriguez – violin on "Mil Besos"
- Brian Standefer - cello
- David Pulkingham - classical guitar on "Mil Besos"

== Charts ==
| Chart (2002) | Peak position |
|---|---|
| US Billboard 200 | 101 |
