= Children Running Through =

Studio album by Patty Griffin
- Released: February 6, 2007
- Genres: Folk, Americana, country folk
- Length: 47:12
- Label: ATO
- Producers: Patty Griffin, Mike McCarthy

Patty Griffin chronology
| Impossible Dream (2004) | Children Running Through (2007) | Patty Griffin: Live from the Artist's Den (2007) |

Singles from Children Running Through
- 1. "Heavenly Day" Released: 2007

Children Running Through is Patty Griffin's sixth commercially released album, and fifth studio album.

The album debuted at number 34 on the Billboard 200 in mid-February, the highest chart position achieved by Griffin in her career. It sold about 27,000 copies in its first week. As of January 2010, the album had sold over 168,000 copies in the United States.

Kelly Clarkson performed a live cover version of "Up To The Mountain (MLK Song)" with Jeff Beck on the "Idol Gives Back" special edition of American Idol on April 25, 2007. Griffin is regarded as one of Clarkson's musical inspirations and Clarkson also covered "No Bad News" during the Nashville concert on her My December Tour. Bonus track "Moon Song" was covered by Griffin's close friend Emmylou Harris on her 2008 album All I Intended to Be.

== Reception ==
Professional ratings
Aggregate scores
| Source | Rating |
|---|---|
| Metacritic | 87/100 |
Review scores
| Source | Rating |
| AllMusic | 4/5 stars |
| The A.V. Club | A− |
| Blender | 3.5/5 stars |
| Entertainment Weekly | A− |
| Paste | 4/5 stars |
| PopMatters | 7/10 |
| Q | 4/5 stars |
| Rolling Stone | 3.5/5 stars |
| Slant Magazine | 4.5/5 stars |
| Uncut | 4/5 stars |

Pittsburgh Post-Gazette said the song "Heavenly Day" gives "Griffin a chance to let that fine voice soar." According to Entertainment Weekly Griffin "effortlessly slow-burns her way through an evocation of good times."

The album was nominated for a Grammy Award for Best Contemporary Folk/Americana Album.

Griffin won Album of the Year and Artist of the Year award at the 2007 Americana Music Honors & Awards ceremony and is one of only three female artists to win the latter (with Griffin being the second after Loretta Lynn in 2005 and Gillian Welch following in 2012).

== Track listing ==
All songs written by Patty Griffin.

Children Running Through – Standard edition
| No. | Title | Length |
|---|---|---|
| 1. | "You'll Remember" | 2:07 |
| 2. | "Stay on the Ride" | 5:17 |
| 3. | "Trapeze" (featuring Emmylou Harris) | 4:23 |
| 4. | "Getting Ready" | 3:15 |
| 5. | "Burgundy Shoes" | 3:26 |
| 6. | "Heavenly Day" | 3:45 |
| 7. | "No Bad News" | 4:02 |
| 8. | "Railroad Wings" | 3:59 |
| 9. | "Up to the Mountain (MLK Song)" | 4:08 |
| 10. | "I Don't Ever Give Up" | 4:00 |
| 11. | "Someone Else's Tomorrow" | 4:06 |
| 12. | "Crying Over" | 4:37 |
| Total length: | | 47:12 |

Children Running Through – Barnes & Noble edition (bonus tracks)
| No. | Title | Length |
|---|---|---|
| 13. | "Free" | 3:54 |
| 14. | "Only Up or Down" | 3:50 |
| Total length: | | 54:56 |

Children Running Through – iTunes Store edition (bonus track)
| No. | Title | Length |
|---|---|---|
| 13. | "Moon Song" | 3:16 |
| Total length: | | 50:28 |

== Personnel ==
- David Angell – Violin
- Kristen Cassel – Cello
- David Davidson – Violin
- Christopher Farrell – Viola
- Traci Goudie – Art Direction, Design
- Patty Griffin – Acoustic Guitar, Piano, Producer, Vox Organ, Drawing
- Emmylou Harris – Background Vocals on "Trapeze"
- Jim Hoke – Baritone & Tenor Saxophone, Bass Harmonica
- Anthony LaMarchina – Cello
- Doug Lancio – Guitar, Autoharp
- JD Foster - Bass
- Michael Longoria – Percussion, Drums
- Mike McCarthy – Producer
- Ian McLagan – Grand Piano
- John Mark Painter – Horn, Horn Arrangements, String Arrangements
- Leslie Richter – Engineer
- Jane Scarpantoni – Cello, Soloist
- Pamela Sixfin – Violin
- Steve Squire – Second Engineer
- Mary Kathryn Vanosdale – Violin
- Jim Vollentine – Engineer
- Kathi Whitley – Production Coordination
- Kristin Wilkinson – Viola
- Glenn Worf – Bass, Tic Tac

== Charts ==
| Chart (2007) | Peak position |
|---|---|
| US Independent Albums (Billboard) | 2 |
| US Billboard 200 | 34 |
