= Flaming Red =

Studio album by Patty Griffin
- Released: June 23, 1998
- Studios: East Iris Studios, Nashville; Tragedy/Tragedy; Woodland Studios, East Nashville; October Studio, Nashville
- Genres: Rock, folk
- Length: 50:15
- Language: English
- Label: A&M
- Producer: Jay Joyce

Patty Griffin chronology
Living with Ghosts (1996)	Flaming Red (1998)	1000 Kisses (2002)

Flaming Red is Patty Griffin's second album. It was released on June 23, 1998, and reached number 12 on the Top Heatseekers chart. According to Billboard, the album has sold 122,000 copies in the U.S. up to May 2004.

== Critical reception ==
Professional ratings
Review scores
Source	Rating
AllMusic	4/5 stars
Entertainment Weekly	A−

Of the album, Griffin herself commented, "I always felt like I was a rock singer. It was all I listened to. I felt like, 'Don't call me a folksinger.'" Called "rock-centric", "incendiary" and "full-bodied", the album marked a shift to recording with a full band. Stephen Thomas Erlewine of AllMusic writes, "Flaming Red is evidence that Griffin is one [of] the more talented and ambitious singer/songwriters to emerge in the late '90s."

NPR named the album to their list of 150 Greatest Albums Made By Women calling it "electrifying" and a "testament to the fire simmering under all of [Griffin's] work preceding this album, and what came after it."

== Legacy and influence ==
In 2010, Katy Perry described Griffin as one of her biggest influences and said Flaming Red was her favorite record during her teen years.

== Track listing ==
All tracks are written by Patty Griffin.

No.	Title	Length
1.	"Flaming Red"	2:13
2.	"One Big Love"	4:14
3.	"Tony"	4:10
4.	"Change"	4:14
5.	"Goodbye"	4:15
6.	"Carry Me"	3:29
7.	"Christina"	4:34
8.	"Wiggley Fingers"	4:07
9.	"Blue Sky"	3:41
10.	"Big Daddy"	3:07
11.	"Go Now"	2:41
12.	"Mary"	5:16
13.	"Peter Pan"	4:14
Total length:		50:15

== Personnel ==
- Patty Griffin – vocals, guitar
- Kenny Aronoff – drums
- John Catchings – strings on "Peter Pan"
- David Davidson – strings on "Peter Pan"
- Chris Feinstein – bass guitar
- Emmylou Harris – backing vocals
- Jay Joyce – guitar, keyboards, programming, producer
- Mike Joyce – bass guitar
- Doug Lancio – guitar
- Buddy Miller – backing vocals
- Julie Miller – backing vocals
- Brad Pemberton – drums
- Kathryn Plummer – strings on "Peter Pan"
- Michael Ramos – keyboards
- Giles Reaves – keyboards, programming
- Frank Sass – drums
- Daniel Tashian – guitar
- Ty Tyler – guitar
- Kristin Wilkinson – strings on "Peter Pan"
- Angelo Petraglia - producer on "One Big Love"

Track information and credits adapted from the album's liner notes.

== Charts ==
Chart (1998)	Peak position
US Heatseekers Albums (Billboard)	12
