= Patty Griffin =

American singer-songwriter and musician

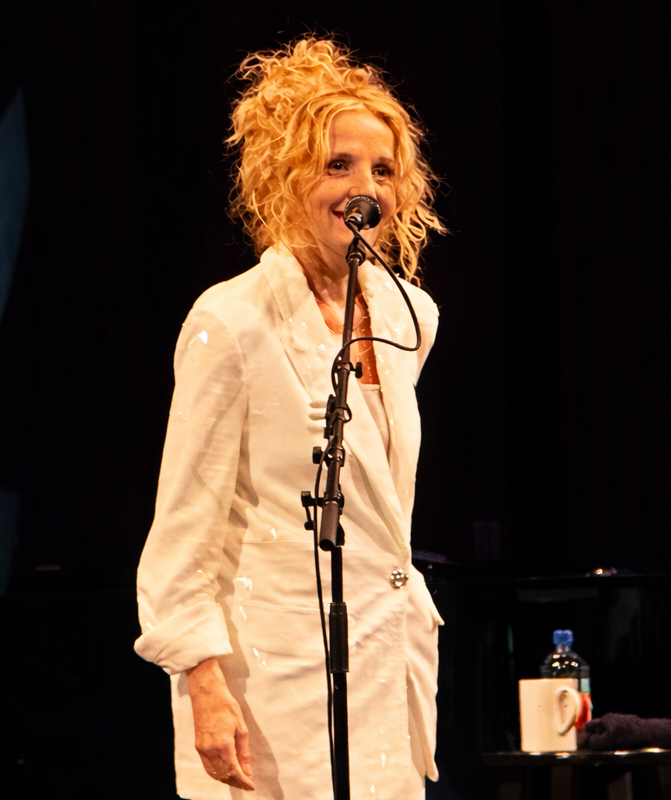
- Griffin performing in Austin, Texas, December 19, 2025

Background information
- Born: Patricia Jean Griffin; March 16, 1964 (age 62)
- Origin: Old Town, Maine, U.S.
- Genres: Americana; folk; folk rock; country folk; gospel; alt-country
- Occupations: Singer; songwriter; musician
- Instruments: Vocals; guitar; piano
- Years active: 1994–present
- Labels: A&M; ATO; Credential; New West
- Website: pattygriffin.com

Patricia Jean Griffin (born March 16, 1964) is an American singer, songwriter, and musician. She is a vocalist and plays guitar and piano. She is known for her stripped-down songwriting style in the folk music genre. Her songs have been covered by numerous musicians, including Emmylou Harris, Ellis Paul, Kelly Clarkson, Rory Block, Dave Hause, Sugarland, Bette Midler and The Chicks.

In 2007, Griffin received the Artist of the Year award from the Americana Music Association, and her album Children Running Through won the award for Best Album. She received the Lifetime Achievement Award for Songwriting at the 2023 Americana Music Honors & Awards. In 2011, Griffin's album Downtown Church won the Grammy Award for Best Traditional Gospel Album and her 2019 self-titled album won the Grammy Award for Best Folk Album. She got a 2026 Grammy Awards nomination for her album Crown of Roses in the Best Folk Album category.

== Biography ==
Griffin was born on March 16, 1964, and is from Old Town, Maine, next to the Penobscot Native American reservation. She is the youngest of seven children in her family. She bought a guitar for $50 at age 16, and initially sang and played with no inclination to become a professional musician. After a six-year marriage that ended in 1994, Griffin began performing in Boston coffee houses and was scouted by A&M Records, which signed her on the strength of her demo tape. When the finished studio recordings were submitted to A&M, company executives thought it was overproduced, so producer Nile Rodgers and the label instead released a stripped-down reworking of her demo recordings as the album Living with Ghosts.

Griffin's second album, Flaming Red, released in 1998, was a departure from the acoustic sound of Living with Ghosts, with a mix of mellow songs and high-tempo rock and roll songs. The title track, "Flaming Red", is an example of the latter, beginning with an even beat until it increases to a fevered pitch of emotion. One of the songs, "Tony", was featured on the charity benefit album Live in the X Lounge.

Her third album, Silver Bell, has a sound similar to its predecessor, but while it was recorded in 2000 it was not released by A&M until 2013 (well after unofficial bootleg copies had been circulating). A&M had dropped Griffin's contract after Silver Bell was recorded, and she was then signed by Dave Matthews' ATO Records. Griffin re-recorded some songs from Silver Bell, such as "Making Pies", "Mother of God", "Standing", and "Top of the World", for inclusion on later releases. After copies of the unreleased Silver Bell recordings were leaked and bootlegged, starting around 2006 they began circulating among fans, many of whom traded/shared music on internet message boards. In August 2013, it was announced that UM^{e} planned to release Silver Bell, mixed by producer Glyn Johns, in October 2013.

Four albums followed on ATO: 1000 Kisses (2002), A Kiss in Time (2003), Impossible Dream (2004), and Children Running Through (2007).

In 2004, Griffin toured with Emmylou Harris, Buddy Miller, Gillian Welch and David Rawlings as the Sweet Harmony Traveling Revue. On February 6, 2007, she released Children Running Through. The album debuted at number 34 on the Billboard 200, with 27,000 copies sold. Of the album, Griffin told Gibson Lifestyle, "I just kind of felt like singing what I wanted to sing, and playing how I wanted to play. It's not all dark and tragic. It's a different way for me to look at things. Getting old—older, I should say, I'm not so serious all the time." It was also said that the album was inspired by her childhood.

Griffin's songs have been recorded by numerous artists, including the Irish-born singer Maura O'Connell ("Long Ride Home"), Linda Ronstadt ("Falling Down"), The Chicks ("Truth No. 2", "Top of the World", "Let Him Fly", "Mary"), Bette Midler, Melissa Ferrick and Missy Higgins ("Moses"), Beth Nielsen Chapman, Christine Collister, and Mary Chapin Carpenter ("Dear Old Friend"), Jessica Simpson ("Let Him Fly"), Martina McBride ("Goodbye"), Emmylou Harris ("One Big Love", "Moon Song"), Bethany Joy Galeotti ("Blue Sky"), the Wreckers ("One More Girl"), Keri Noble and Ruthie Foster ("When It Don't Come Easy"), Joan Osborne ("What You Are"), Solomon Burke ("Up to the Mountain"), Miranda Lambert ("Getting Ready"), and Drew Holcomb & The Neighbors ("Long Ride Home"). Kelly Clarkson performed "Up to the Mountain" with Jeff Beck on guitar, accompanied by some orchestration on the "Idol Gives Back" episode of American Idol, and the live recording was released as a single immediately afterwards, reaching number 56 on the Billboard Hot 100 in its first week and giving Griffin her highest-charting position as a songwriter. (The audience gave Clarkson a standing ovation following her performance.) Griffin's version of the song was featured in episode 11 of the fourth season of the ABC television show Grey's Anatomy.

== Instruments, effects, and sound ==
- 1965 Gibson J-50 Guitar
- 1993 Gibson J-200 Junior Guitar
- Charles Fox Guitar

== Recent work ==
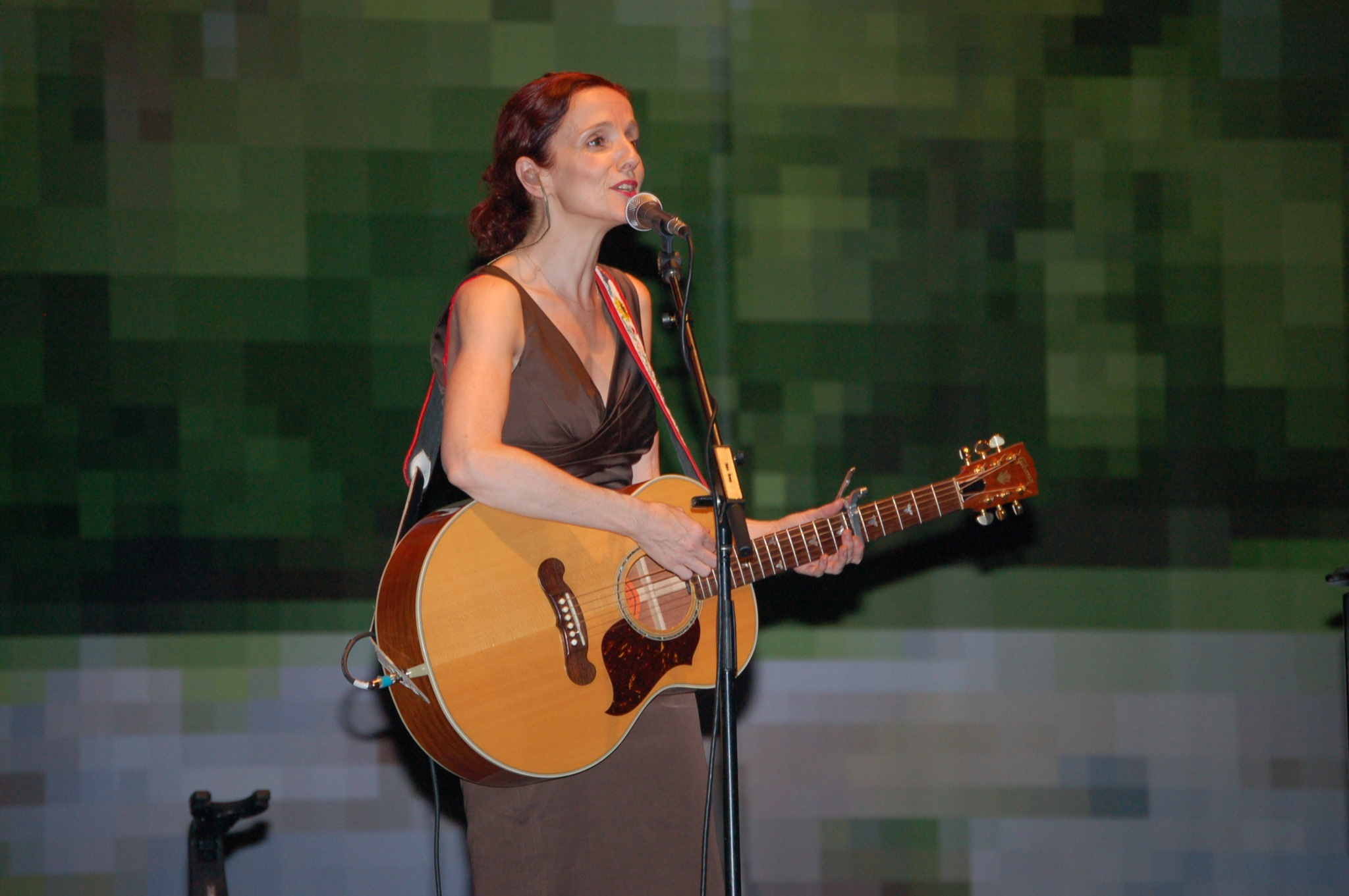
Griffin performing at the North Carolina Museum of Art in 2006

In September 2008, Griffin sang "You Got Growing Up to Do" in a duet with indie artist Joshua Radin on his album Simple Times. In October 2008, she sang background vocals on Todd Snider's cover of John Fogerty's "Fortunate Son" for Snider's Peace Queer album. In February 2009, she was featured on the album Feel That Fire, by Dierks Bentley, in a duet on the song "Beautiful World". In 2009, Griffin, along with Mavis Staples and the Tri-City Singers released a version of the song "Waiting for My Child to Come Home" on the compilation album Oh Happy Day: An All-Star Music Celebration.

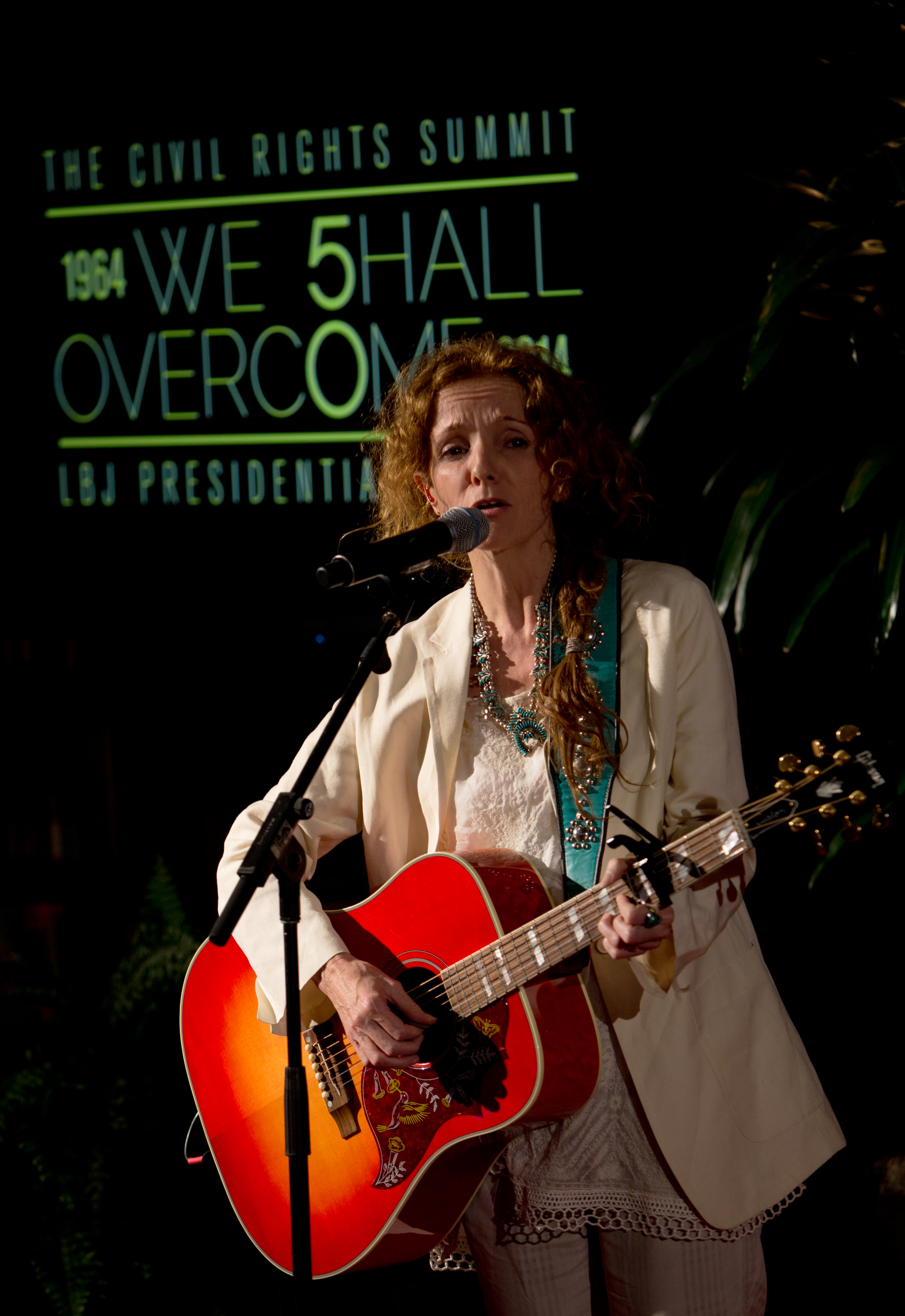
Griffin performing "Up To the Mountain" at the Carter Reception Dinner during the Civil Rights Summit at the LBJ Presidential Library in 2014

The collaboration with Staples led EMI's Peter York to suggest Griffin make an album of gospel songs. Griffin agreed on the condition that friend and bandmate Buddy Miller produce the record. The album, Downtown Church (her sixth studio album), recorded at the Downtown Presbyterian Church in Nashville, was released on January 26, 2010. The album, featuring Shawn Colvin, Emmylou Harris, and Griffin's long-time friends Buddy and Julie Miller, contains songs by Hank Williams, and Willie Mae "Big Mama" Thornton, as well as "All Creatures of Our God and King" (credited to St. Francis of Assisi).

In July 2010, Robert Plant toured the United States with Band of Joy (reprising the name of his band in the 1960s), with Griffin as a backing vocalist and singer-guitarist Buddy Miller, multi-instrumentalist and vocalist Darrell Scott, bassist-vocalist Byron House, and drummer-percussionist-vocalist Marco Giovino. She is also featured on Plant's solo album Band of Joy, released in September 2010 by Rounder Records.

In 2014 Griffin parted with Plant after a long relationship; they had lived together and divided their time between Austin, Texas, and England. In 2019, Griffin released "River", a track from her then upcoming self-titled album and her first new music since battling breast cancer. Patty Griffin was released on March 8, 2019.

On January 11, 2019, along with an official announcement of her new album release Patty Griffin (on her PGM Recordings label via Thirty Tigers), a new song, "River", she announced a 2019 concert tour. She followed this with Tape in 2022.

Griffin released her eleventh studio album, Crown of Roses, on July 25, 2025. The album was produced by Craig Ross and distributed by Thirty Tigers, while the artwork featured her late mother on her wedding day. She also announced the Crown of Roses tour starting on June 27, 2025, which includes a special record release show at Sony Hall in New York City and a headline performance at the Heights Theater in Houston, Texas.

== Film, television, and theater ==
In 1997, Griffin's song "Not Alone", from the album Living with Ghosts, was used in the final scene and ending credits for the 1997 film Niagara, Niagara. It was also used at the end of episode 6 ("Believers") of season 1 of the television series Crossing Jordan, broadcast on October 29, 2001; on the 2009 release of the soundtrack from the television series Without a Trace; and at the end of episode 12 of season 10 of the television series NCIS, which aired on January 15, 2013.

Griffin has appeared in several movies, including Cremaster 2 and Cameron Crowe's Elizabethtown, the soundtrack of which includes her song "Long Ride Home" and a cover of "Moon River", by Johnny Mercer and Henry Mancini.

In 1997 her song "One Big Love", from the album Flaming Red, was used in the final scenes and credits of the film Digging to China.

In 2004, her song "Rowing Song" was used in episode 9 ("The Trick Is to Keep Breathing") of season 2 of the television series One Tree Hill.

In 2005, her songs "Cold As It Gets", "Rowing Song" and "Forgiveness" were featured in Tim Kirkman's film Loggerheads. Only "Cold As It Gets" and "Forgiveness" appear on its soundtrack.

The 2006 film Griffin and Phoenix included "Nobody's Crying" and "Rain".

In 2006, her song "Rain" was used in episode 17 ("The Skull in the Desert") of season 1 of the television series Bones.

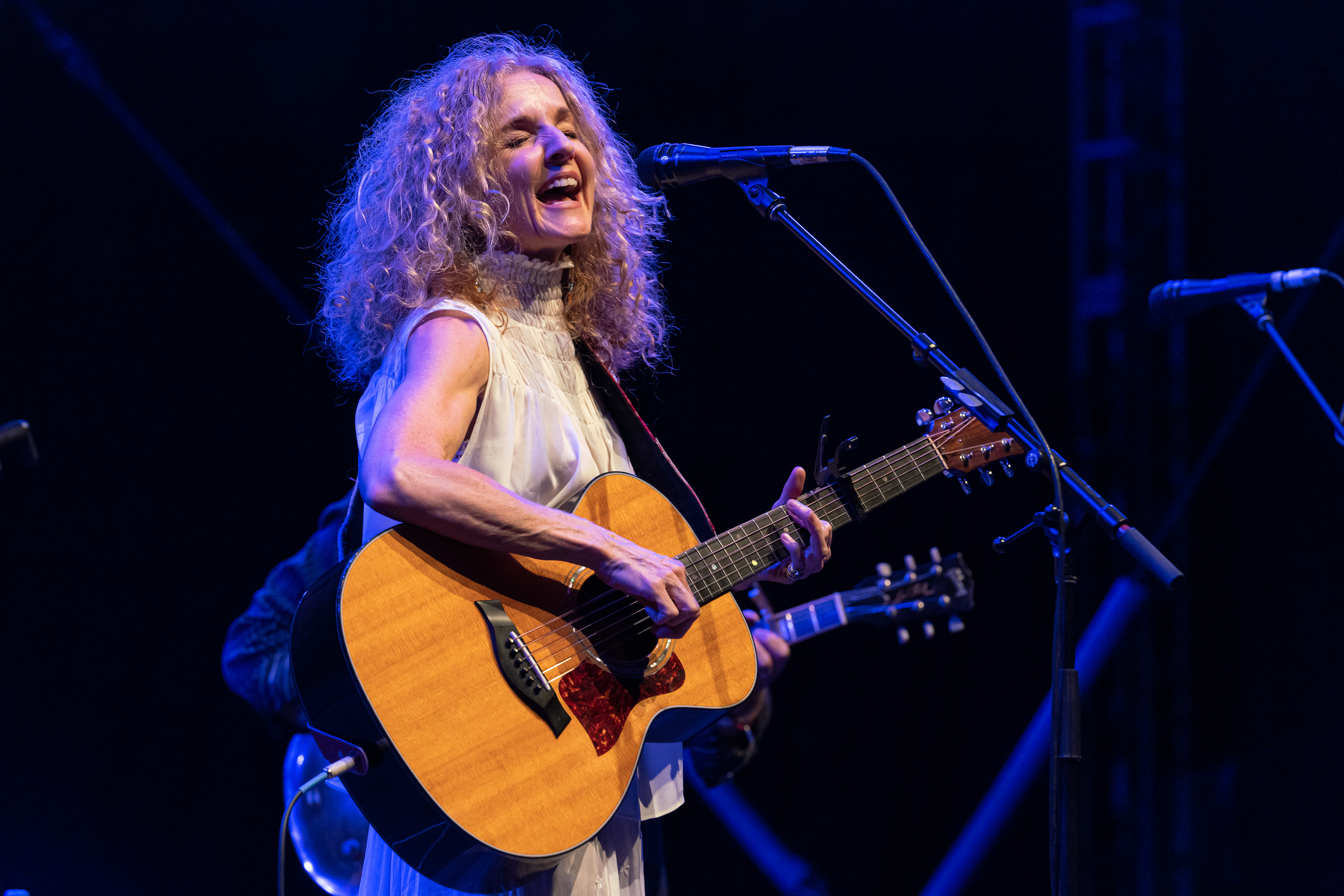
Griffin in 2019

Her song "Heavenly Day" has been featured in multiple television series: at the end of episode 16 ("Promise", 2007) of season 6 of Smallville; episode 5 of season 1 (2018) in the Netflix series Haunting of Hill House; and during the wedding scene in episode 10 ("The Big Day", 2024) of season 6 of Netflix's Virgin River. Also, in May 2013, "Heavenly Day" was used in a commercial for Chevy's new Volt line of automobile, entitled "Volt: Silent Statement".

In 2007, the Atlantic Theater Company produced 10 Million Miles, an off-Broadway musical, directed by Michael Mayer, with music and lyrics by Griffin.

In 2009, her song "Mary" was used in episode 10 of season 2 of Sons of Anarchy, and "When It Don't Come Easy" closed out season 2, episode 8 of In Plain Sight.

Griffin's first DVD, Patty Griffin: Live From the Artists Den, was filmed on February 6, 2007, at the Angel Orensanz Foundation for the Arts on New York's Lower East Side and released later that year. Selections from the DVD were featured on the program Live from the Artists Den on Ovation TV, beginning January 24, 2008.

In 2007, Griffin was named Artist of the Year by the Americana Music Association, the top honor bestowed by the association, and her album Children Running Through was selected as Best Album. At the awards ceremony she performed "Trapeze" with Emmylou Harris harmonizing.

On June 13, 2008, Griffin performed an acoustic-in-the-round set in Nashville with Kris Kristofferson and Randy Owen (Alabama), for a taping of a PBS songwriters series aired in December 2008. Each of them played five songs; Griffin performed "Top of the World", "Making Pies", "No Bad News", "Up to the Mountain", and "Mary".

In January 2013, the song "You Are Not Alone" was featured in episode 12 of season 10 of NCIS.

In May 2015, her song "Go Wherever You Wanna Go" was used in episode 22 of season 10 of the television series Supernatural.

In 2015, the song "Let Him Fly" was a turning point for Nick Yarris in the documentary The Fear of Thirteen.

In 2023, Griffin's 2013 performance of her song "I'm Gonna Miss You When You're Gone" in the Bing Lounge at 101.9 KINK.FM. was included in Nick Cassavetes's action-thriller film God is a Bullet.

== Discography ==
=== Studio albums ===
Title	Details	Peak chart positions					
Title	Details	US	US Christ	US Folk	US Indie	US Rock	US Taste
Living with Ghosts	Release date: May 21, 1996; Label: A&M; Formats: CD, cassette	—	—	—	—	—	—
Flaming Red	Release date: June 23, 1998; Label: A&M; Formats: CD, cassette	—	—	—	—	—	—
1000 Kisses	Release date: April 9, 2002; Label: ATO; Formats: CD, cassette	101	—	—	—	—	—
Impossible Dream	Release date: April 20, 2004; Label: ATO; Formats: CD, music download	67	—	—	—	—	—
Children Running Through	Release date: February 6, 2007; Label: ATO; Formats: CD, music download	34	—	—	2	—	5
Downtown Church	Release date: January 26, 2010; Label: Credential; Formats: CD, music download	38	1	1	—	7	8
American Kid	Release date: May 7, 2013; Label: New West; Formats: CD, LP, music download	36	—	4	5	11	3
Silver Bell	Release date: October 8, 2013; Label: A&M, UM^{e}; Formats: CD, LP, music download	64	—	5	—	22	25
Servant of Love	Release date: September 25, 2015; Label: Self-released / Thirty Tigers; Formats: CD, LP, music download	68	—	3	8	15	13
Patty Griffin	Release date: March 8, 2019; Label: PGM (Self-released) / Thirty Tigers; Formats: CD, LP, music download	—	—	11	5	46	5
Tape	Release date: June 10, 2022; Label: PGM (Self-released) / Thirty Tigers; Formats: CD, LP, music download	—	—	—	—	—	—
Crown of Roses	Release date: July 25, 2025; Label: PGM (Self-released / Thirty Tigers; Formats: CD, LP, music download						
"—" denotes releases that did not chart

=== Live albums ===
Title	Details
A Kiss in Time	Release date: October 7, 2003; Label: ATO; Formats: CD, cassette
Patty Griffin: Live from the Artist's Den	Release date: September 9, 2008; Label: Artists Den; Formats: Music download, DVD
Before Sunrise (Live 1992)	Release date: February 13, 2020; Label: Lo-Light Records; Formats: Music download, streaming

=== Other contributions ===
- Lilith Fair: A Celebration of Women in Music (1998) – "Cain" (recorded live during the 1997 tour)
- Live at the World Café: Vol. 15 - Handcrafted (2002, World Café) – "Rain"
- 107.1 KGSR Radio Austin – Broadcasts Vol.10 (2002) – "Rain"
- Elizabethtown Soundtrack (2005, RCA Records) – "Long Ride Home", "Moon River"
- Oh Happy Day (2009, EMI Gospel/Vector Recordings) – "Waiting for My Child To Come Home" (with Mavis Staples and The Tri-City Singers)
- Live at the World Cafe: Vol. 5 (1997, World Cafe Records) – "Every Little Bit"
- Live at the World Cafe: Vol. 16 – Sweet Sixteen (World Cafe Records) – "Makin' Pies"
- Feel That Fire (2009) - "Beautiful World" (Dierks Bentley featuring Patty Griffin)
- Band of Joy (2010, Decca/Rounder) - backing vocalist for Robert Plant on tracks 2–5, 8, 10–11
- I Love: Tom T. Hall's Songs of Fox Hollow (2011, Red Beet) – "I Love"
- Nathan Bell's Red, White, and American Blues (It Couldn't Happen Here) (2021, Singular Recordings/Gokuhi Ent.) – "American Gun", "A Lucky Man", "To Each of Us (A Shadow)"

=== Singles ===
Year	Title	Peak positions	Album
Year	Title	US AAA	Album
1997	"Every Little Bit"	—	Living with Ghosts
1998	"One Big Love"	5	Flaming Red
1999	"Blue Sky"	7	Flaming Red
2002	"Rain"	—	1000 Kisses
2002	"Chief"	—	1000 Kisses
2004	"Love Throw a Line"	—	Impossible Dream
2007	"Heavenly Day"	17	Children Running Through
2013	"Ohio"	—	American Kid
2015	"Rider of Days"	—	Servant of Love
2019	"River"	—	Patty Griffin
"—" denotes releases that did not chart

==== As a featured artist ====
Year	Title	Peak positions	Album
Year	Title	US Country	Album
2009	"Seeing Stars" (Jack Ingram featuring Patty Griffin)	54	Big Dreams & High Hopes

=== Music videos ===
Year	Video	Director
1996	"Every Little Bit"	
1998	"One Big Love"	
2002	"Chief"	Traci Goudie
2003	"Rain"	Traci Goudie
2004	"Love Throw a Line"	Traci Goudie
2009	"Beautiful World" (with Dierks Bentley)	
2010	"Little Fire"	
2013	"Ohio"	Roy Taylor

Awards
Preceded by James McMurtry	AMA Album of the Year (artist); 2007	Succeeded by Alison Krauss & Robert Plant
Preceded by Neil Young	AMA Artist of the Year; 2007	Succeeded by Levon Helm
