= Concussion (album) =

Studio album by Matthew Ryan
- Released: 2001
- Genre: Alt-country
- Label: Waxy Silver

Matthew Ryan chronology
East Autumn Grin (2000)	Concussion (2001)	Dissent from the Living Room (2002)

Professional ratings
Review scores
Source	Rating
AllMusic	3/5 stars

Concussion is an album by the American musician Matthew Ryan, released in 2001 on Waxy Silver.

== Production ==
The album was recorded over the course of eight days; "Somebody Got Murdered" is a cover of the Clash song. Ryan duets with Lucinda Williams on "Devastation".

== Critical reception ==
No Depression thought that "Ryan has one of those love-it-or-hate-it voices, but like Dylan or Neil Young, it’s a sound that perfectly captures his lyrics."

AllMusic wrote that "in his rough, sandpaper vocals, Ryan sings about troubled relationships and doomed characters in songs often focusing on matters of violence, either of physical or emotional kind."

== Track listing ==
All words and music by Matthew Ryan, except where noted.

1. "Drift"
2. "Rabbit"
3. "Happy Hour"
4. "Too Soon to Tell"
5. "Devastation"
6. "Autopilot"
7. "Chickering Angel"
8. "Night Watchman"
9. "Somebody Got Murdered" (The Clash)
10. "Shake the Tree"
