= Buddy Miller discography =

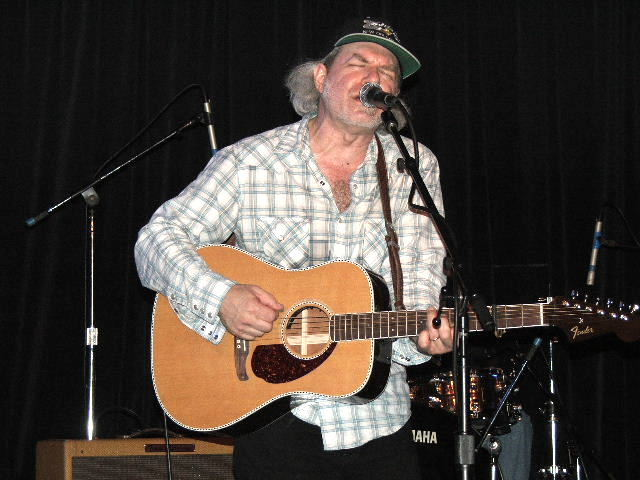
- Buddy Miller at Hardly Strictly Bluegrass in 2005
- Studio albums: 10
- Live albums: 1
- Compilation albums: 2

The American singer Buddy Miller has released 10 studio albums (including 4 albums of collaborations with other artists), 1 live album, and 2 compilation albums.

In addition, Buddy has produced, engineered, and acted as supporting musician on numerous recordings by other artists. He has also contributed tracks to many compilation albums to celebrate other artists or to support causes.

== As primary artist ==
=== Solo studio albums ===
Year	Album	Peak chart positions					Label
Year	Album	US Country	US Christian	US	US Heat	US Indie	Label
1995	Your Love and Other Lies						HighTone
1997	Poison Love						HighTone
1999	Cruel Moon						HighTone
2002	Midnight and Lonesome	50					HighTone
2004	Universal United House of Prayer	64	40				New West
2011	The Majestic Silver Strings	37			8	41	New West
2026	Buddy Miller						New West

=== Live albums ===
Year	Album	Peak chart positions					Label
Year	Album	US Country	US Christian	US	US Heat	US Indie	Label
2016	Cayamo: Sessions at Sea	30			12	31	New West

=== With Julie Miller ===
Year	Album	Peak chart positions					Label
Year	Album	US Country	US Christian	US	US Heat	US Indie	Label
2001	Buddy & Julie Miller (with Julie Miller)	45			41		HighTone
2009	Written in Chalk (with Julie Miller)			159	3		New West
2019	Breakdown on 20th Ave. South (with Julie Miller)						New West
2023	In the Throes (with Julie Miller)						New West

=== With Jim Lauderdale ===
Year	Album	Peak chart positions					Label
Year	Album	US Country	US Christian	US	US Heat	US Indie	Label
2012	Buddy & Jim (with Jim Lauderdale)	67			20		New West

=== With the Sacred Cows ===
Year	Album	Peak chart positions					Label
Year	Album	US Country	US Christian	US	US Heat	US Indie	Label
1995	Man on the Moon						Coyote

=== Compilation albums ===
Year	Album	Peak chart positions					Label
Year	Album	US Country	US Christian	US	US Heat	US Indie	Label
2004	Love Snuck Up (with Julie Miller)						HighTone
2008	The Best of the HighTone Years						Shout! Factory

== As primary contributing artist ==
- 1982: Candle - Lullabies & Nursery Rhymes Volume 1 () - tracks A2, "I'll Dream of You" and A5, "Don't Be Afraid of the Dark"
- 1994: various artists - Strong Hand of Love: A Tribute to Mark Heard (Sony Music) - track 16, "Orphans of God" (with Julie Miller)
- 1995: various artists - Noel (VIA Records) - track 10, "Away in a Manger" (with Julie Miller)
- 2003: various artists - It'll Come to You: The Songs of John Hiatt (Vanguard Records) - track 1, "Paper Thin" (with Julie Miller)
- 2005: various artists - To: Kate – A Benefit For Kate's Sake (Western Beat) - track 3, "Away in a Manger" (with Julie Miller)
- 2005: Various Artists - Live At The World Cafe Vol. 20 (World Café) - track 3, "Worry Too Much"
- 2010: Preservation Hall Jazz Band - Preservation: An Album to Benefit Preservation Hall & the Preservation Hall Music Outreach Program (Preservation Hall Recordings) - track 18, "I Ain't Got Nobody" (with the Preservation Hall Jazz Band)
- 2011: various artists - The Bridge School Concerts: 25th Anniversary Edition DVD (Reprise) - DVD 1 track 8, "Love Hurts (with Emmylou Harris)
- 2011: various artists - I Love Tom T. Hall's Songs of Fox Hollow (Red Beet) - track 2, "Sneaky Snake"
- 2011: various artists - Underground Rockabilly (Chrome Dreams) - track 7, "I Got Me a Woman"
- 2011: Steve Cropper - Dedicated: A Salute to the 5 Royales (429 Records) - track 11, "The Slummer the Slum" (with Steve Cropper)
- 2012: various artists - Mercyland: Hymns for the Rest of Us (Mercyland Records) - track 3, "I Believe in You"
- 2012: various artists - We Walk the Line: A Celebration of the Music of Johnny Cash (Sony Music) - track 4, "Hey Porter"
- 2013: various artists - Let Us in Americana: The Music of Paul McCartney (Reviver Records) - track 2, "Yellow Submarine"
- 2016: various artists - Dear Jerry: Celebrating the Music of Jerry Garcia (Rounder Records) - track 5, "Deal"
- 2016: various artists - The Life & Songs of Emmylou Harris: An All-Star Concert Celebration (Rounder Records) - track 1, "One of These Days"
- 2017: various artists - Treasure of the Broken Land: the Songs of Mark Heard (Storm Weathered) - track 16, "Treasure Of The Broken Land"

== As producer ==
=== 1990-1999 ===
- 1990: Julie Miller - Meet Julie Miller (Myrrh Records)
- 1991: Julie Miller - He Walks Through Walls (Word Distribution)
- 1992: Mark Heard - Satellite Sky (Enclave / Fingerprint)
- 1992: Reverend Dan Smith - Just Keep Goin' On (Glasshouse Records)
- 1993: Julie Miller - Orphans and Angels (Myrrh Records)
- 1993: Mark Heard - High Noon (Fingerprint / Sky)
- 1993: Nina Åström - Matter of Time (Nelson Word)
- 1997: Julie Miller - Blue Pony (Hightone Records)
- 1998: Greg Trooper - Popular Demons (Koch Records)
- 1998: Emmylou Harris - Spyboy (Eminent)
- 1999: Julie Miller - Broken Things (Hightone Records)

=== 2000-on ===
- 2000: Bill Mallonee and Vigilantes of Love – Audible Sigh (Compass Records)
- 2000: Jimmie Dale Gilmore - One Endless Night (Rounder Records)
- 2003: Mark Heard - Hammers & Nails (Paste Records)
- 2006: Solomon Burke - Nashville (Shout! Factory)
- 2008: Allison Moorer - Mockingbird (New Line Records)
- 2010: Patty Griffin - Downtown Church (CMG Music Group Gospel)
- 2010: Robert Plant - Band of Joy (Rounder Records)
- 2012: Carolina Chocolate Drops - Leaving Eden (Nonesuch Records)
- 2012: Nashville cast - The Music of Nashville: Season 1, Vol. 1 (Decca Records/Big Machine)
- 2013: various artists - The Music Is You: A Tribute to John Denver (ATO Records)
- 2013: Nashville cast - The Music of Nashville: Season 1, Vol. 2 (Decca Records/Big Machine)
- 2013: Nashville cast - The Music of Nashville: Season 2, Vol. 1 (Decca Records/Big Machine)
- 2013: Richard Thompson - Electric (New West Records)
- 2013: Shawn Colvin - All Fall Down (Nonesuch Records)
- 2013: The Devil Makes Three - I'm a Stranger Here (New West Records)
- 2013: The Wood Brothers - The Muse (Southern Ground)
- 2014: Nashville cast - The Music of Nashville: Season 2, Vol. 2 (Decca Records/Big Machine)
- 2014: Nashville cast - The Music of Nashville: Original Soundtrack Season 3, Vol. 1 (Decca Records/Big Machine)
- 2016: Nashville cast - The Music of Nashville: Season 4, Vol. 2 (Decca Records/Big Machine)
- 2015: Christina Aguilera - "Shotgun"
- 2016: Shawn Colvin & Steve Earle - Colvin & Earle (Fantasy Records)

== As engineer ==
- 2005: Jude Johnstone - On a Good Day (Bojack)
- 2016: Sarah McLachlan - Wonderland (Verve)

== As supporting musician ==
1990s

- 1992: Heather Myles - Just Like Old Times (Hightone)
- 1993: Wes King - The Robe (RCA)
- 1993: Lisa Daggs - Angel on Your Eyes (Pakaderm)
- 1994: Jim Lauderdale - Pretty Close to the Truth (Atlantic)
- 1995: Heather Myles - Untamed (Hightone)
- 1995: Nina Åström - Moods (Spark)
- 1995: Jim Lauderdale - Every Second Counts (Atlantic)
- 1996: Tammy Rogers - Tammy Rogers (Dead Reckoning)
- 1996: Jim Lauderdale - Persimmons (Upstart)
- 1996: Midnight Oil - (Breathe (Sprint / CBS)
- 1997: George Ducas – Where I Stand (Capitol Nashville)
- 1997: Kate Campbell Moonpie Dreams (Compass)
- 1997: Jim Lauderdale - Whisper (BNA)
- 1998: Allison Moorer - Alabama Song (MCA Nashville)
- 1998: Candle - Bullfrogs and Butterflies II: God Loves Fun (Birdwing)
- 1998: Duane Jarvis - Far From Perfect (Watermelon)
- 1998: Lee Ann Womack - Some Things I Know (Decca)
- 1998: Lucinda Williams - Car Wheels on a Gravel Road (Mercury)
- 1998: Fernando Ortega - The Breaking of the Dawn (Sony Music)
- 1998: N'Dea Davenport - N'Dea Davenport (V2)
- 1998: Trisha Yearwood - Where Your Road Leads (MCA Nashville)
- 1998: Patty Griffin - Flaming Red (A&M)
- 1998: Victoria Williams - Musings of a Creek Dipper (Atlantic)
- 1999: Bob Delevante - Porchlight (Relay)
- 1999: Brooks Williams - Hundred Year Old Shadow (Signature Sounds)
- 1999: Jim Lauderdale - Onward Through It All (RCA)
- 1999: Kasey Chambers - The Captain (Asylum)
- 1999: Phil Madeira - Three Horse Shoes (Silent Planet)
- 1999: Stacy Dean Campbell - Ashes of Old Love (Warner Bros.)
- 2000: Bobby Whitlock - It's About Time (Koch)
- 2000: Elvis Costello - National Ransom (Hear Music / Universal)
- 2000: Emmylou Harris - Red Dirt Girl (Nonesuch)
- 2000: Lee Ann Womack - I Hope You Dance (MCA Nashville)

2000s

- 2001: Duane Jarvis - Certified Miracle (Slewfoot)
- 2001: Kasey Chambers - Barricades & Brickwalls (EMI / Warner Bros.)
- 2002: The Chieftains - Down the Old Plank Road: The Nashville Sessions (RCA)
- 2002: Jim Lauderdale - The Hummingbirds (Dualtone)
- 2002: Siobhan Maher Kennedy - Immigrant Flower (BMG)
- 2003: Albert Lee - Heartbreak Hill (Sugar Hill)
- 2003: Duane Jarvis - Delicious (Slewfoot)
- 2003: Patty Griffin - A Kiss in Time (ATO)
- 2003: Ray Wylie Hubbard - Growl (Philo)
- 2003: Emmylou Harris - Stumble into Grace (Nonesuch)
- 2004: Doug Seegers - Going Down to the River (Rounder)
- 2004: Lori McKenna - Bittertown (Signature Sounds)
- 2005: Colin Linden - Southern Jumbo (Bad Reputation)
- 2005: Frank Black - Honeycomb (Back Porch / Cooking Vinyl)
- 2005: Heather Myles - Rum & Rodeo (Hightone / Shout!)
- 2005: Miranda Lambert - Kerosene (Epic Nashville)
- 2005: Patty Griffin - Impossible Dream (Proper)
- 2005: Rodney Crowell - The Outsider (Columbia)
- 2006: Albert Lee - Road Runner (Sugar Hill)
- 2006: Brigitte DeMeyer - Something After All (BDM)
- 2006: Frank Black - Fast Man Raider Man (Cooking Vinyl
- 2006: Jonny Lang - Turn Around (A&M)
- 2006: Linda Ronstadt and Ann Savoy - Adieu False Heart (Vanguard)
- 2006: Mindy Smith - Long Island Shores (Vanguard)
- 2006: P. F. Sloan - Sailover (Hightone)
- 2006: Sam Bush - Laps in Seven (Sugar Hill)
- 2007: Levon Helm - Dirt Farmer (Vanguard)
- 2008: Chip Taylor and Carrie Rodriguez - Live from the Ruhr Triennale October 2005 (Train Wreck)
- 2008: Jim Lauderdale and the Dream Players - Honey Songs (Yep Roc)
- 2009: John Fogerty - The Blue Ridge Rangers Rides Again (Verve Forecast / Fortunate Son)
- 2010: Willie Nelson - Country Music (Rounder)
- 2011: Levon Helm - Ramble at the Ryman (Vanguard / Dirt Farmer)
- 2014: Jack Clement - For Once and For All (EMI / I.R.S. Records)
- 2014: Jim Lauderdale - I'm a Song (Sky Crunch)
- 2014: Johnny Cash - Out Among the Stars (Columbia)
- 2014: Lee Ann Womack - The Way I'm Livin' (Sugar Hill)
- 2015: Asleep at the Wheel - Still the King: Celebrating the Music of Bob Wills and His Texas Playboys (Proper Records)
- 2016: Chelle Rose - Blue Ridge Blood (Lil' Damsel)
- 2016: Elizabeth Cook - Exodus of Venus (Agent Love Records)
- 2016: Martina McBride - Reckless (Nash Icon / Universal)
- 2017: Blackie and the Rodeo Kings - Kings and Kings (File Under Music)
