= List of songs written by Buddy and Julie Miller =

This article contains a list of compositions by Buddy Miller, Julie Miller, and their collaborators.

Each composition is followed by the album or albums on which it appears.

== List of compositions ==
Key

1. written by Julie Miller
2. written by Buddy Miller
3. co-written by Julie Miller and Buddy Miller
2. co-written by Julie Miller, Buddy Miller and Jim Lauderdale
5. co-written by Julie Miller and Larry Campbell
6. co-written by Julie Miller, Jim Lauderdale, and K.R. Ladner
7. co-written by Julie Miller and Bill Mallonee
8. co-written by Julie Miller and Bill Frisell
9. co-written by Buddy Miller and Jim Lauderdale
10. co-written by Buddy Miller and Victoria Williams

=== 1–9 ===
"100 Million Little Bombs" ^{3}

- 1997: Buddy Miller – Poison Love (HighTone)
- 2006: Michael Stanley – The Farrago Sessions (Line Level)

=== A–D ===
"A Kiss on the Lips" ^{1}

- 1997: Julie Miller – Blue Pony (HighTone)
- 2002: Siobhan Maher Kennedy – Immigrant Flower (BMG)

"All My Tears" ^{1}

- 1995: Emmylou Harris – Wrecking Ball
- 1996: Jimmy Scott – Heaven (Warner Bros)
- 1999: Julie Miller – Broken Things (HighTone)
- 2006: Jars of Clay – Good Monsters (Sony)
- 2006: Selah – Bless the Broken Road: The Duets Album (Curb)
- 2008: The Gordons – Our Time (Inside-Out Records)
- 2009: Po' Girl – Deer in the Night (Po' Girl Music)
- 2013: Ane Brun – Rarities (Balloon Ranger)

"All the Pieces of Mary" ^{1}

- 1997: Julie Miller – Blue Pony (HighTone)

"Baby Don't Let Me Down" ^{3}

- 1997: Buddy Miller – Poison Love (HighTone)

"Blue Pony" ^{1}

- 1997: Julie Miller – Blue Pony (HighTone)

"Broken Things" ^{1}

- 1999: Julie Miller – Broken Things (HighTone)
- 2001: Lucy Kaplansky – Every Single Day (Red House)
- 2010: Ryan Kelly – In Time (self-released)

"By Way of Sorrow" ^{1}

- 1997: Julie Miller – Blue Pony (HighTone)
- 1998: Cry Cry Cry - Cry Cry Cry (Razor & Tie)

"Chalk" ^{1}

- 2009: Buddy & Julie Miller – Written in Chalk (Hightone)

"Cruel Moon" ^{3}

- 1999: Buddy Miller – Cruel Moon (HighTone)
- 2006: April Verch – Take Me Back (Rounder)

"Dancing Girl" ^{1}

- 1997: Julie Miller – Blue Pony (HighTone)

"Dangerous Place ^{1}

- 1990: Julie Miller – Meet Julie Miller (Myrrh)

"Dirty Water" ^{3}

- 2001: Buddy & Julie Miller – Buddy & Julie Miller (Hightone)
- 2002: John Mayall & The Bluesbreakers – Stories (Eagle)
- 2012: Janiva Magness – "Stronger For It" (Alligator)

"Does My Ring Burn Your Finger" ^{3}

- 1999: Buddy Miller – Cruel Moon (HighTone)
- 2000: Lee Ann Womack – I Hope You Dance (MCA Nashville)
- 2013: Flatt Lonesome – Flatt Lonesome (Pisgah Ridge / Select-O-Hits)

"Dogtown" ^{1}

- 1990: Julie Miller – Meet Julie Miller (Myrrh)

"Don't Cry for Me" ^{1}

- 1990: Julie Miller – Meet Julie Miller (Myrrh)

"Don't Listen to the Wind" ^{1}

- 1995: Buddy Miller – Your Love and Other Lies (HighTone)
- 2014: Lee Ann Womack – The Way I'm Livin' (Sugar Hill)

"Don't Say Goodbye" ^{1}

- 2009: Buddy & Julie Miller – Written in Chalk (Hightone)

"Don't Tell Me" ^{3}

- 1997: Buddy Miller – Poison Love (HighTone)
- 1998: Lee Ann Womack – Some Things I Know (Decca)

"Don't Wait" ^{9}

- 2004: Buddy Miller – Universal United House of Prayer (New West)

"Draggin the River" ^{3}

- 1997: Buddy Miller – Poison Love (HighTone)

=== E–G ===
"Ellis County" ^{1}

- 2009: Buddy & Julie Miller – Written in Chalk (Hightone)

"Every Time We Say Goodbye" ^{1}

- 2009: Buddy & Julie Miller – Written in Chalk (Hightone)

"Fall on the Rock" ^{1}

- 2004: Buddy Miller – Universal United House of Prayer (New West)

"Fire and Water" ^{3}

- 2004: Buddy Miller – Universal United House of Prayer (New West)

"Forever Has Come to an End" ^{1}

- 2001: Buddy & Julie Miller – Buddy & Julie Miller (Hightone)

"Forever My Beloved" ^{1}

- 1997: Julie Miller – Blue Pony (HighTone)

"Garage Sale" ^{2}

- 1998: James King – The Bluegrass Storyteller (Rounder)

"Gasoline and Matches" ^{3}

- 2009: Buddy & Julie Miller – Written in Chalk (Hightone)
- 2011: Arnold McCuller – Soon As I Get Paid (MRI / What's Good)
- 2011: Michael Grimm – Michael Grimm (Epic / Syco)
- 2013: Julie Roberts – Good Wine & Bad Decisions (Red River / Relativity)
- 2013: LeAnn Rimes – Spitfire (Curb)

"Give Me An Ocean" ^{1}

- 1997: Julie Miller – Blue Pony (HighTone)
- 2006: Mathilde Santing And The New Traditions – Under Your Charms (Epic)

"God's Winged Horse" ^{8}

- 2001: Buddy Miller – The Majestic Silver Strings (New West)

=== H–I ===
"He Walks Through Walls" ^{1}

- 1991: Julie Miller – He Walks Through Walls (Word)

"Help Wanted" ^{3}

- 1997: Buddy Miller – Poison Love (HighTone)
- 2005: Maren Morris – Walk On (Mozzi Blozzi)

"Holding Up the Sky" ^{1}

- 2001: Buddy & Julie Miller – Buddy & Julie Miller (Hightone)

"Hole in My Head" ^{9}

- 1995: Buddy Miller – Your Love and Other Lies (HighTone)
- 1999: Dixie Chicks – Fly (Monument)
- 2004: Lucy Kaplansky – The Red Thread (Red House)

"Hush, Sorrow" ^{1}

- 2009: Buddy & Julie Miller – Written in Chalk (Hightone)
- 2016: Derri Daugherty – Hush Sorrow (Lo-Fidelity)

"I Call on You" ^{1}

- 1997: Julie Miller – Blue Pony (HighTone)

"I Can't Get Over You" ^{1}

- 2002: Buddy Miller – Midnight and Lonesome (HighTone)
- 2004: Julie Roberts – Julie Roberts (Mercury)
- 2006: Linda Ronstadt and Ann Savoy -Adieu False Heart (Vanguard)

"I Can't Help It" ^{1}

- 1997: Buddy Miller – Poison Love (HighTone)

"I Can't Slow Down" ^{3}

- 1995: Buddy Miller – Your Love and Other Lies (HighTone)

"I Don't Mean Maybe" ^{3}

- 1995: Buddy Miller – Your Love and Other Lies (HighTone)
- 2000: Scott Joss – A New Reason to Care (Little Dog)

"I Know Why The River Runs" ^{1}

- 1999: Julie Miller – Broken Things (HighTone)
- 2000: Lee Ann Womack – I Hope You Dance (MCA Nashville)

"I'm Not Getting Any Better at Goodbye" ^{3}

- 1997: Buddy Miller – Poison Love (HighTone)

"I'm Pretending" ^{3}

- 1995: Buddy Miller – Your Love and Other Lies (HighTone)

"I'm Too Used to Loving You" ^{3}

- 1997: Buddy Miller – Poison Love (HighTone)

"I Need You" ^{1}

- 1999: Julie Miller – Broken Things (HighTone)
- 2012: Chelle Rose – Ghost of Browder Holler (Lil' Damsel Records)

"In Memory of my Heart" ^{3}

- 1999: Buddy Miller – Cruel Moon (HighTone)
- 2011: Shanna Strasberg – Shanna Strasberg (Unsprung)

"Is That You" ^{3}

- 2004: Buddy Miller – Universal United House of Prayer (New West)

"I Still Cry" ^{1}

- 1999: Julie Miller – Broken Things (HighTone)
- 2000: Ilse DeLange – Livin' On Love (WEA)
- 2006: April Verch – Take Me Back (Rounder)

"I Will Follow You" ^{1}

- 1991: Julie Miller – He Walks Through Walls (Word)

=== J–M ===
"June" ^{1}

- 2009: Buddy & Julie Miller – Written in Chalk (Hightone)

"King of my Heart" ^{1}

- 1990: Julie Miller – Meet Julie Miller (Myrrh)

"Labor of Love" ^{1}

- 1986: Silverwind – Set Apart (Sparrow)

"Last Song" ^{7}

- 1997: Julie Miller – Blue Pony (HighTone)

"Letters to Emily" ^{1}

- 1997: Julie Miller – Blue Pony (HighTone)

"Little Bitty Kiss" ^{3}

- 2002: Buddy Miller – Midnight and Lonesome (HighTone)

"Little Darlin'" ^{1}

- 2001: Buddy & Julie Miller – Buddy & Julie Miller (Hightone)

"Lonesome For You" ^{6}

- 1997: Buddy Miller – Poison Love (HighTone)
- 1999: Hank Williams III – Risin' Outlaw (Curb)

"Looking for a Heartache Like You" ^{4}

- 1999: Buddy Miller – Cruel Moon (HighTone)
- 2003: Patty Loveless – On Your Way Home (Epic)
- 2012: Buddy Miller and Jim Lauderdale – Buddy and Jim (New West)

"Long Time" ^{1}

- 2009: Buddy & Julie Miller – Written in Chalk (Hightone)

"Love Grows Wild" ^{3}

- 1997: Buddy Miller – Poison Love (HighTone)
- 2010: Dierks Bentley – Up on the Ridge (Capitol)

"Love in the Ruins" ^{9}

- 1997: Buddy Miller – Poison Love (HighTone)

"Love Snuck Up" ^{9}

- 1997: Buddy Miller – Poison Love (HighTone)

"Love Will Find You" ^{1}

- 1990: Julie Miller – Meet Julie Miller (Myrrh)

"Maggie" ^{1}

- 1999: Julie Miller – Broken Things (HighTone)

"Memphis Jane" ^{1}

- 2009: Buddy & Julie Miller – Written in Chalk (Hightone)

"Midnight and Lonesome" ^{1}

- 2002: Buddy Miller – Midnight and Lonesome (HighTone)

"Midnight Highway" ^{5}

- 2015: Larry Campbell and Teresa Williams – Larry Campbell & Teresa Williams (Red House)

"My Love Will Follow You" ^{3}

- 1995: Buddy Miller – Your Love and Other Lies (HighTone)
- 1996: Brooks & Dunn – Borderline (Arista)

"My Psychiatrist" ^{1}

- 1990: Julie Miller – Meet Julie Miller (Myrrh)

"Mystery Love" ^{3}

- 1990: Julie Miller – Meet Julie Miller (Myrrh)

=== N–R ===
"Oh Fait Pitié d'Amour (Love Have Mercy on Me)" ^{1}

- 2002: Buddy Miller – Midnight and Lonesome (HighTone)

"Orphan Train" ^{1}

- 1999: Julie Miller – Broken Things (HighTone)
- 2008: Allison Moorer – Mockingbird (New Line)

"Out In the Rain" ^{1}

- 1999: Julie Miller – Broken Things (HighTone)

"Quecreek" ^{1}

- 2002: Buddy Miller – Midnight and Lonesome (HighTone)

"Rachel" ^{1}

- 2001: Buddy & Julie Miller – Buddy & Julie Miller (Hightone)

"Returning" ^{9}

- 2004: Buddy Miller – Universal United House of Prayer (New West)

"Ride The Wind To Me" ^{1}

- 1999: Julie Miller – Broken Things (HighTone)
- 2000: Ilse DeLange – Livin' On Love (WEA)

=== S–T ===
"Shelter Me" ^{3}

- 2004: Buddy Miller – Universal United House of Prayer (New West)
- 2011: Blackie and the Rodeo Kings – Kings and Queens (Dramatico / File Under: Music)
- 2011: Selah – Hope of the Broken World (Curb)
- 2012: Paul Thorn – "What the Hell Is Goin' On?" (Perpetual Obscurity)
- 2012: Suzie Vinnick – Live at Bluesville (self-released)

"Sometimes I Cry" ^{9}

- 1999: Buddy Miller – Cruel Moon (HighTone)
- 2001: Toni Catlin – Heartache on the Run (self-released)

"Somewhere Trouble Don't Go" ^{1}

- 1999: Buddy Miller – Cruel Moon (HighTone)
- 2008: Gibson Brothers – Iron & Diamonds (Sugar Hill)
- 2009: Miranda Lambert – Revolution (Columbia Nashville)
- 2012: Joe Bonamassa – Driving Towards the Daylight (Provogue)
- 2013: Nick Woodland – Something I Heard (Downhill / Galileo)

"Song to the Devil (I'm Thru with You)" ^{3}

- 1990: Julie Miller – Meet Julie Miller (Myrrh)

"Strange Lover" ^{1}

- 1999: Julie Miller – Broken Things (HighTone)

"Take Me Back" ^{1}

- 1997: Julie Miller – Blue Pony (HighTone)
- 1998: Suzy Bogguss – Nobody Love, Nobody Gets Hurt (Capitol)
- 2006: April Verch – Take Me Back (Rounder)

"That's Just How She Cries" ^{1}

- 2001: Buddy & Julie Miller – Buddy & Julie Miller (Hightone)

"The Devil is the Angel" ^{1}

- 1997: Julie Miller – Blue Pony (HighTone)

"The River's Gonna Run" ^{1}

- 2001: Buddy & Julie Miller – Buddy & Julie Miller (Hightone)
- 2006: Sam Bush – Laps in Seven (Sugar Hill)

"The Speed of Light" ^{1}

- 1999: Julie Miller – Broken Things (HighTone)

"This Old World" ^{10}

- 2004: Buddy Miller – Universal United House of Prayer (New West)

"Through the Eyes of a Broken Heart" ^{1}

- 1995: Buddy Miller – Your Love and Other Lies (HighTone)

"Too Many Troubles" ^{3}

- 2003: The Dixie Hummingbirds – Diamond Jubilation (Rounder)

=== W–Y ===
"Watching Amy Dance" ^{2}

- 1995: Buddy Miller – Your Love and Other Lies (HighTone)

"Water When the Well is Dry" ^{2}

- 2002: Buddy Miller – Midnight and Lonesome (HighTone)

"What Would Jesus Do" ^{1}

- 1990: Julie Miller – Meet Julie Miller (Myrrh)

"When It Comes to You" ^{4}

- 2002: Buddy Miller – Midnight and Lonesome (HighTone)

"Who Owns Your Heart" ^{3}

- 1985: Steve Archer – Action (Home Sweet Home)
- 1990: Julie Miller – Meet Julie Miller (Myrrh)

"Wide River To Cross" ^{3}

- 2004: Buddy Miller – Universal United House of Prayer (New West)
- 2007: Levon Helm – Dirt Farmer (Vanguard)
- 2010: Carrie Rodriguez – Love and Circumstance (Ninth Street Opus / Diverse)
- 2012: Balsam Range – Papertown (Mountain Home)
- 2012: Diana Krall – Glad Rag Doll (Verve)
- 2014: Joel Harrison – Mother Stump (Cuneiform Records)

"Wild Card" ^{4}

- 2002: Buddy Miller – Midnight and Lonesome (HighTone)

"You Knew the Way to My Heart" ^{1}

- 1990: Julie Miller – Meet Julie Miller (Myrrh)

"You Make My Heart Beat Too Fast" ^{1}

- 2001: Buddy & Julie Miller – Buddy & Julie Miller (Hightone)
- 2016: Wynonna Judd & The Big Noise – Wynonna & the Big Noise (Curb Records)

"You're Still Gone" ^{1}

- 2016: Shawn Colvin and Steve Earle – Colvin & Earle (Fantasy)

"You Wrecked Up My Heart" ^{3}

- 1995: Buddy Miller – Your Love and Other Lies (HighTone)
- 2007: Brigitte DeMeyer – Something After All (BDM)

== Sources ==
- Official website
- Buddy Miller at AllMusic
- Julie Miller at AllMusic
