= Honky Tonk Highway (disambiguation) =

Honky Tonk Highway may refer to

- Honky Tonk Highway refers to the Broadway Historic District (Nashville, Tennessee)
- Honky Tonk Highway (song) Luke Combs song

== See also ==
- Honky Tonk Freeway 1981 American-British comedy film
- Highways and Honky Tonks album by Heather Myles
