= Spitfire (LeAnn Rimes album) =

Studio album by LeAnn Rimes
- Released: April 15, 2013
- Recorded: 2011–2012
- Studios: Capitol Studios (Hollywood, California); Surf Shack Studios (Los Angeles, California); Blackbird Studio, Absolute Sound and Sputnik Sound (Nashville, Tennessee)
- Genre: Country
- Length: 47:20
- Label: Curb
- Producers: Darrell Brown; LeAnn Rimes

LeAnn Rimes chronology
Lady & Gentlemen (2011)	Spitfire (2013)	Dance Like You Don't Give a.... Greatest Hits Remixes (2014)

Singles from Spitfire
- 1. "What Have I Done" Released: November 20, 2012; 2. "Borrowed" Released: December 18, 2012; 3. "Spitfire" Released: September 10, 2013; 4. "Gasoline and Matches" Released: December 23, 2013

Spitfire is the thirteenth studio album by American country music singer LeAnn Rimes. It was first released in the United Kingdom and Australia on April 15, 2013, by Curb Records via digital download and a CD release followed in the United Kingdom on April 22, 2013, while in Australia and Germany the CD was released on April 26, 2013. In the United States and Canada, the album was released exclusively to Walmart stores on June 4, 2013. It is the final album released by Rimes under her contract with Curb Records.

The album garnered mixed reviews from music critics. Many praised Rimes for her third country album in a row and stated that the album was one of Rimes's best so far, while others criticized the album for the subject topics in the songs and none being "commercially" suited for radio.

Following its release in the UK, the album debuted at number seven on the UK Country Albums Chart and peaked at number three the following week. In Australia, on the week of May 6, 2013, the album entered the Australian Country Album Chart at number forty and peaked at number nineteen. Meanwhile, in the US, the album peaked at number thirty-six on the Billboard 200, while on the Billboard Top Country Albums chart it peaked at number nine.

== Background ==
=== Album ===
Rimes began working on Spitfire back in 2011 shortly after the release of her cover album, Lady & Gentlemen. The album originally had fifteen tracks but was condensed down to thirteen tracks (not including the exclusive live bonus tracks). According to Rimes, "[the album] is a peek into my world; who I am, what I've gone through, what my emotions are, it's an intimate conversation between me and whoever's listening. I hope I'm saying things that are hard for others to express." Rimes also stated that the album "covers a range of emotions that I've experienced in my lifetime, from anger to love, from frustrations to letting go," as well as how her and co-producer, Darrell Brown, had "talked about telling that story in chronological order, but that didn't work sonically, so he said, ‘It's the truth…in no particular order.' And isn't that what life is about?" Rimes also noted that "It certainly took me a lot of work to get to this point. And it’s still easier to sing these thoughts than it is to say them out loud. The intimacy in my music is just beginning." Mike Curb also commented on the album stating "We've always known she is a great singer, this album simply proves outright that LeAnn is a great, multi-faceted artist." The album includes a cover of Australian singer, Missy Higgins' "Where I Stood" from Higgins' album, On a Clear Night (2007), as well as a cover of Buddy and Julie Miller's "Gasoline and Matches" from their album Written in Chalk (2009), and features Alison Krauss, guitarist Jeff Beck, Rob Thomas from Matchbox Twenty and Dan Tyminski. It is Rimes's last contract-obligated release with the label, Curb Records, of which she had been with for almost eighteen years.

=== Songs ===
In an interview with the New York Daily News, Rimes went into the background of two songs on the album. According to Rimes, when speaking about "What Have I Done" noted, "[I] actually wrote it about a friend, but it was almost foreseeing things that were going to happen in a way. I was still with Dean at the time, and he heard the song and knew it was about [Eddie and me] before I did." With "Borrowed", Rimes stated, "Obviously, it was a very controversial topic to write about...As hard as it was for me to write the song, I think it painted a true picture of that situation. I wanted to describe a very stark moment in my life. You just feel in complete limbo, and I felt guilty too; it wasn’t pretty at all."

In 2018, Rimes re-recorded "Borrowed" as a duet with Stevie Nicks.

== Release ==
The album was originally scheduled for a late release in 2012 but for unknown reasons the album was pushed back. The album was first released to digital download on iTunes in both the UK and Australia on April 15, 2013. On April 22, 2013, a physical CD was released in the UK, while the physical album was released in Australia and Germany on April 26. Rimes announced via her Twitter that the album would be released on June 4, 2013, in the US. It was released exclusively to US Walmart stores and includes a bonus track consisting of a live version of "Borrowed". The US division of Amazon.com also released the album, via digital download, with an exclusive bonus track, a live version of the title track, "Spitfire". The US iTunes Store also released the album by digital download with an exclusive bonus track of a live version of "What Have I Done". The album was also released to Walmart stores in Canada featuring the same bonus track as the US album. The Canadian division of iTunes also released the album to digital download also with the same bonus track released in the US.

== Promotion ==
=== Singles ===
To promote the album, Rimes released four singles, the first "What Have I Done", was released on November 20, 2012 and was intended to be released to radio stations but was replaced by the second single, "Borrowed", which was released on December 18, 2012. Dan Milliken of Country Universe gave a positive review on "What Have I Done" giving it a grade rating of "A" and stating that it "manages to unfold all this reality gently, each line like a carefully measured breath in a meditation." Billy Dukes of Taste of Country gave a negative review of the song "Borrowed" stating that the song "won't help her threadbare tie to radio". Dukes called the song "awkward" and stated that it "may be cathartic for the singer, but no matter how artistically sound and beautiful the song is, [it’s awkward…] like a lump in your throat when you’re trying to enjoy a slice of pumpkin pie." The title track was released as the third single from the album on September 10, 2013. "Gasoline and Matches" began playing on "The Pulse" on Sirius Satellite Radio starting December 23, 2013.

=== Videos ===
Rimes also released five music videos of in the studio recordings on YouTube, as well as CMT.com. The first, "What Have I Done", was released on November 19, 2012. The second, "Borrowed", was released on January 3, 2013. The third, the title track, was released on April 9, 2013. The fourth, "Just a Girl Like You", was released on May 24, 2013. An animated music video for "Gasoline and Matches" was released on December 7, 2013.

=== Other ===
In March 2012, Rimes and Brown gave family, friends, music executives and The Boot a live preview of songs from the album in a studio at Capitol Records Tower in Hollywood, California.

== Critical reception ==
Professional ratings
Review scores
Source	Rating
AllMusic	4/5 stars
Associated Press	3/3 stars
Country Weekly	B+
Daily Express	3/5
Taste of Country	4/5 stars
USA Today	4/4 stars

Stephen Thomas Erlewine of AllMusic stated that the album is one of Rimes's "better records". He continued by stating "When she's not collaborating, Rimes demonstrates excellent taste in cover material – she records Missy Higgins' "Where I Stood," kicks up dust on Liz Rose/Chris Stapleton/Morgane Hayes' rockabilly raver "You Ain't Right," and gets down and dirty on Buddy & Julie Miller's "Gasoline and Matches," trading verses with Rob Thomas then letting Jeff Beck run wild—which gives the record dimension if not a singular momentum." Erlewine concluded by stating that Rimes's label, Curb Records, "[isn't] banking on its success—but that's one of the reasons it's satisfying: all the loose ends, the deliberate detours into sounds both old and new, illustrate Rimes' range and her skill, as she never sounds uneasy in any of these settings. It's not perfect—it's too long, its sequencing is haphazard—and yet all the music on Spitfire resonates, every song suggesting an avenue Rimes could pursue the next time out." Erlewine gave the album four out of five stars. At Country Weekly, Jon Freeman wrote that "unlike most of us, she's also a damn good country singer. On her new album, Spitfire, LeAnn attempts to wade through some of what's happened in her life over the last three years—the highs and lows and the stuff in between. With that in mind, Spitfire is not all pretty or comfortable." Daryl Addison of Great American Country praised the album by stating Rimes "delivers a fascinating look at her own hard lessons with one of the year's most honest and revealing releases." Billy Dukes of Taste of Country noted how "Spitfire is a fascinating album, and at times one feels like a voyeur listening to it. It's like breaking into your sister's dresser drawer and finding her diary, but high-quality songwriting keeps it from resembling a childish tabloid." At USA Today, Brian Mansfield affirmed that "Rimes has been making records since she was 12 but finds her genuine voice here, at 30, with songs so honest and vulnerable they'll provide her haters fresh ammunition. As fine and true as any country album released this year." Michael McCall from the Associated Press gave the album three out of three stars and wrote a positive review stating that out of all the albums released throughout Rimes's career that Spitfire "tops them all" and continued by stating "[Rimes] displays a newfound subtlety in her strong voice on several songs, effectively using phrasing and shifts in tone to express complex feelings that sound as if they come from real experience. It's too soon to say Rimes has finally found a direction that can carry her back to the top of the charts, but Spitfire does show she's found her adult voice – as a songwriter as well as a singer."

Stephin Unwin of Daily Express rated the album three out of five and commented on "Borrowed" by saying the song is "the best riposte to the question on everybody's lips which is… well, if you don't know about the affair she had with another woman's famous man this will fill you in." He continued on about the song stating that "[It's] a perfect country song, gets you right there, even brings up a tear or two if you're in the mood." Unwin concluded by commenting on Rimes growing up and maturing by stating "we love, a mature, talented and affecting songwriter, who is also a human being. Sounds naff, right? Maybe, until you hear the songs." Alan Light of The New York Times stated "It’s unclear [though] how Spitfire will be received by country music fans. Having left Nashville for Los Angeles, become fodder for the scandal sheets and recorded an album that doesn’t sound like the glossy hits on country radio, Ms. Rimes is far from a sure thing commercially." Light also added that "Spitfire... represents the boldest steps — in both music and lyrics — of her career."

== Commercial performance ==
The album debuted on the UK Country Albums Chart at number seven on the week of April 27, 2013, and on the following week of May 4, 2013, the album peaked at number three, and in the following week of May 11, 2013, the album dropped to number nine. In Australia, the album charted at number forty on the Australian Country Albums Chart on the week of May 6, 2013. The following week, May 13, 2013, the album peaked at number nineteen. On the week of May 20, 2013, the album dropped to number twenty-four. In the United States, the following week after the album's release, it entered and peaked the Billboard 200 at number thirty-six. and entered and peaked at number nine on the Billboard Top Country Albums chart. On the week of June 29, 2013, the album had dropped to number twenty-one on the Top Country Albums chart, whilst on the Billboard 200 it fell to number seventy-eight.

== Track listing ==
Spitfire track listing
No.	Title	Writer(s)	Length
1.	"Spitfire"	Rimes; Darrell Brown; David Baerwald	2:57
2.	"What Have I Done" (featuring Alison Krauss and Dan Tyminski)	Rimes; Brown; Baerwald	4:21
3.	"Gasoline and Matches" (featuring Rob Thomas and Jeff Beck)	Buddy Miller; Julie Miller	3:46
4.	"Borrowed"	Rimes; Brown; Dan Wilson	3:32
5.	"You Ain't Right"	Liz Rose; Chris Stapleton; Morgane Hayes	3:06
6.	"I Do Now"	Rimes; Brown; Wilson	3:54
7.	"Where I Stood"	Missy Higgins	4:24
8.	"You've Ruined Me"	Rimes; Brown; John Shanks	3:44
9.	"Bottle"	Gary Burr; Christina Aldendifer	3:35
10.	"A Waste Is a Terrible Thing to Mind"	Rimes; Brown; Baerwald	2:58
11.	"Just a Girl Like You"	Rimes; Brown; Nathan Chapman	3:53
12.	"God Takes Care of Your Kind"	Rimes; Brown; Dean Sheremet	3:14
13.	"Who We Really Are"	Brown; Sarah Buxton	3:56
Total length:			47:20

Walmart exclusive bonus track
No.	Title	Writer(s)	Length
14.	"Borrowed" (live)	Rimes; Brown; Wilson	3:37
Total length:			50:57

US Amazon.com exclusive bonus track
No.	Title	Writer(s)	Length
14.	"Spitfire" (live)	Rimes; Brown; Baerwald	3:00
Total length:			50:20

US and Canada iTunes exclusive bonus track
No.	Title	Writer(s)	Length
14.	"What Have I Done" (live)	Rimes; Brown; Baerwald	4:34
Total length:			51:54

== Personnel ==
Credits for Spitfire adapted from the liner notes. Musicians

- LeAnn Rimes – vocals, backing vocals
- Darrell Brown – Hammond B3 organ, Wurlitzer electric piano, backing vocals
- Rami Jaffee – Hammond B3 organ, accordion
- Tom Bukovac – acoustic guitars, electric guitars
- Dean Parks – acoustic guitars
- Ilya Toshinsky – acoustic guitars, banjo
- Dan Tyminski – acoustic guitars, mandolin, backing vocals, vocals (2)
- Waddy Wachtel – acoustic guitars
- Jeff Beck – electric guitars (3), electric guitar solo (3)
- Paul Franklin – pedal steel guitar
- Stuart Duncan – fiddle, mandolin
- Willie Weeks – bass
- Steve Jordan – drums
- Chad Cromwell – thumb drums
- Chris McHugh – hand drums, handclaps
- Craig Krampf – tambourine
- Neal Coomer – backing vocals
- Joanna Janét – backing vocals
- Loretta Munoz – backing vocals
- Alison Krauss – vocals (2)
- Rob Thomas – vocals (3)
- Chris Stapleton – backing vocals (5)

Production

- Darrell Brown – producer, arrangements
- LeAnn Rimes – producer, arrangements
- Niko Bolas – associate producer
- Elizabeth Brannon – production manager (Nashville)
- Roger Canevari – production manager (Los Angeles)
- Sara Hertel – photography
- Planet Propaganda – design
- Octagon Entertainment – management

Technical credits

- Ron McMaster – mastering at Capitol Mastering (Hollywood, California)
- Ian Sefchick – mastering assistant
- Niko Bolas – recording, mixing, additional recording
- Steve Genewick – recording, additional recording, mix assistant
- Vance Powell – mixing
- Al Schmitt – mixing
- Graham Archer – additional recording
- Darrell Brown – additional recording, digital editing
- Chandler Harrod – additional recording
- Jay Woodward – additional recording, recording assistant
- Nathan Yarborough – additional recording
- Mark Petaccia – mix assistant
- David Leonard – digital editing
- Brian David Willis – digital editing
- David Martinez – digital editing

== Charts ==
Chart performance for Spitfire
Chart (2013)	Peak position
Australian Albums (ARIA)	193
Australian Country Albums Chart (ARIA)	19
UK Country Albums Chart (OCC)	3
US Billboard 200	36
US Billboard Top Country Albums	9

== Release history ==
Release history and formats for Spitfire
Country	Date	Format	Label	Catalog number
Australia	April 15, 2013	Digital download	Curb	—N/a
Australia	April 26, 2013	Compact disc	Curb	88725478672
Canada	June 4, 2013	Compact disc	Curb	D2-79365
Canada	June 4, 2013	Digital download	Curb	—N/a
Germany	April 26, 2013	Compact disc	Rhino UK, Curb	5053105663828
United Kingdom	April 15, 2013	Digital download	Curb	—N/a
United Kingdom	April 22, 2013	Compact disc	Rhino UK, Curb	5053105663828
United States	June 4, 2013	Compact disc	Curb	D2-79365
United States	June 4, 2013	Digital download	Curb	—N/a
