= Music Machine =

Music Machine may also refer to:

- The Music Machine, a 1960s American rock band
- The Music Machine (film), 1979
- Music Machine (album series), a series of children's music albums and videos by Candle, including:
  - Music Machine II, 1983
- The Music Machine (nightclub), a defunt live-music venue in West Los Angeles, established in 1982
- Music Machine (Melody Club album), 2002
- Music Machine, a 2003 album by Erik Norlander
- KOKO (music venue), a live-music venue in London, formerly known as The Music Machine
- The Music Machine starring Jet-Boot Jack, US title of the 1983 video game Jet-Boot Jack
- The Music Machine (video game), see List of Atari 2600 games
- Music Machine, a video release by Hi-5
- RAM Music Machine, a music add-on for the ZX Spectrum
