= Something After All =

Studio album by Brigitte DeMeyer
- Released: April 11, 2006
- Genre: Country
- Length: 42:42
- Label: 33rd Street Records
- Producer: Brady Blade

Brigitte DeMeyer chronology
Nothing Comes Free (2003)	Something After All (2006)	The Red River Flower (2009)

Professional ratings
Review scores
Source	Rating
AllMusic	3.5/5 stars

Something After All is the third studio album by Brigitte DeMeyer.

== Critical reception ==
Ronnie D. Lankford Jr. of AllMusic concludes his review with, "Something After All is a finely wrought country-folk album."

No Depression Magazine says: "Producer Brady Blade's thoughtful arrangements, built upon organic and atmospheric elements, provide the perfect setting for DeMeyer's soulful vocals" and ethereal lyricism. The results sound something like Sheryl Crow backed by Emmylou Harris Spyboy band."

Edward F. Nesta reviews the album for Luxery Experience and writes, "On Something After All she surrounds herself with a Who’s Who of musical talent, but Brigitte does not get lost; this is her release. Brigitte shows her talents having written 8 of the 11 tracks, as well as performing all of the lead vocals; though she is an accomplished guitarist from her solo performance days, she leaves the acoustic and electric guitar playing in the hands of the likes of Joban Carlberg, Chris Rossbach, Joacim Backman and Buddy Miller."

- See original reviews for full articles. Links can be found in the references section of this article.

== Track listing ==
All tracks are written by Brigitte DeMeyer and Chris Rossbach, unless otherwise noted.

No.	Title	Writer(s)	Length
1.	"By and By"	Brigitte DeMeyer; Joacim Backman	3:41
2.	"Mama's on a Mission"		3:42
3.	"Honey Darlin'"	Brigitte DeMeyer	2:56
4.	"Something After All"		4:28
5.	"More than I Can Do"	Steve Earle	2:57
6.	"Good as Gone"		4:40
7.	"You Wrecked up My Heart"	Julie Miller; Buddy Miller	3:07
8.	"Long Road"		4:19
9.	"Latter Days"	Linford Detweiler	3:41
10.	"I See You"	Brigitte DeMeyer; Chris Rossbach; Darryl Jones	5:18
11.	"Ruby"	Brigitte DeMeyer	3:53
Total length:			42:42

Track information verified from the album's liner notes and checked against AllMusic and Discogs.

== Personnel ==
- Vocals – Brigitte DeMeyer
- Acoustic Guitar – Chris Rosbach (tracks: 3, 4, 6, 8, 9, 11), Joacim Backman (tracks: 1 to 3, 6 to 10), Johan Carlberg (tracks: 2, 4, 10, 11)
- Backing Vocals – Bernard Fowler (tracks: 3, 6, 8, 10, 11), Brigitte DeMeyer (tracks: 3)
- Banjo – Emily Saliers (tracks: 2)
- Baritone Guitar – Chris Rosbach (tracks: 7)
- Bass – Darryl Jones (tracks: 2 to 10)
- Drums – Brady Blade (tracks: 2, 4 to 11)
- Electric Guitar – Buddy Miller (tracks: 7), Chris Rosbach (tracks: 5), Daniel Lanois (tracks: 10), Joacim Backman (tracks: 2, 10, 11), Johan Carlberg (tracks: 2, 6, 7, 9 to 11)
- Electric Guitar [Fender Strat] – Chris Rosbach (tracks: 2)
- Electric Guitar [Gretsch] – Joacim Backman (tracks: 4)
- Guitar – Joacim Backman (tracks: 5), Johan Carlberg (tracks: 5)
- Guitar [Ebow] – Joacim Backman (tracks: 9), Johan Carlberg (tracks: 9)
- Guitar [Gretsch] – Johan Carlberg (tracks: 8)
- Harmonica – Steve Earle (tracks: 5)
- Harmony Vocals – Brady Blade (tracks: 5), Brigitte DeMeyer (tracks: 5), Buddy Miller (tracks: 1), Buddy Miller (tracks: 7), Emily Saliers (tracks: 4)
- Organ [B-3] – Jimmy Pugh (tracks: 1, 2, 5, 6, 9, 11)
- Organ [Fender Rhodes] – Jimmy Pugh (tracks: 9)
- Organ [Hammond] – Jimmy Pugh (tracks: 6)
- Organ [Wurlitzer] – Brady Blade (tracks: 6), Jimmy Pugh (tracks: 8, 10), Nic "Ned" Manders (tracks: 1, 3, 6)
- Pedal Steel Guitar – Daniel Lanois (tracks: 4, 6)
- Percussion – Brady Blade (tracks: 2, 3, 6, 7, 11)
- Piano – Jimmy Pugh (tracks: 9), Nic "Ned" Manders (tracks: 4)
- Piano [Tack] – Jimmy Pugh (tracks: 7)
- Slide Guitar – Johan Carlberg (tracks: 3)
- Synthesizer [Taurus Pedals] – Daniel Lanois (tracks: 4)
- Producer – Brady Blade
- Engineer [Assistant] – Steve Armstrong
- Mastered By – Andy VanDette
- Programmed By [Strings] – Joacim Backman (tracks: 4)
- Recorded By, Mixed By, Engineer – Nic Manders
- Programmed By – Joacim Backman (tracks: 1)

Personnel credits adapted from Discogs.
