= Music Machine II =

Music Machine II: All About Love

Studio album by Candle
- Released: 1983
- Recorded: 1983
- Genre: Children's music, Christian music
- Label: Birdwing records

Candle chronology
Music Machine: The Fruit Of The Spirit	''Music Machine II: All About Love''	Music Machine III: Majesty of God

Music Machine II (AKA The Music Machine: All About Love) (1983) is a Christian children's album by Candle that is a continuation of the Music Machine album from 1977. It is set in Agapeland, and teaches children about Love. It features the characters Stevie and Nancy. It is part of a series of spin-offs of Music Machine albums, books, and Music Machine movies. This album is the winner of the 1983 Dove Award for "Children's Music Album of the Year," and it was Nominated for the 1983 Grammy Award "Best Recording for Children."

== Track listing ==
1. "When Love Lives in Your Heart" (J. Miller) - soloist Betsy Hernandez
2. "Tune Up Song" (J. Miller, B. Miller) - soloists Julie Miller and Buddy Miller
3. "The Greatest Thing of All" (J. Miller) - soloist Nathan Carlson
4. "Love Never Fails" (J. Miller, R. Krueger) - soloist Buddy Miller
5. "Glad to Be Me" (J. Miller, B. Miller) - soloist Ben Roberts
6. "I Was Made for Love" (J. Miller, B. Miller) - soloists Buddy Miller, Julie Miller, Heather Stevens, and Ben Roberts
7. "Sloop Song" (B. Hernandez, B. Miller) - soloists Wayne Zeitner, Heather Stevens and John Swartzbaugh
8. "Bee Humble" (S. Simonson) - soloist Jeremy Stevens
9. "I Love You" (R. Krueger) - soloist Heather Stevens
10. "Love Waits a Long, Long Time" (F. Hernandez) - soloist Frank Hernandez as Herbert the Snail and Herbert's mom
11. "Everybody Needs a Lot of Love" (R. Krueger) - soloist Buddy Miller
12. "I Love You, Lord Jesus" (J. Miller)

== Credits ==
- Story by - Agape Force
- Executive Producer - Tony Salerno
- Producers - Tony Salerno, Fletch Wiley, and Ron Krueger
- Arrangers - Fletch Wiley, Buddy Miller
- Recording Engineers - Wally Duguid, Brian Tankersley, and Bob Singelton
- Recorded at - Rivendell Sound Recorders in Pasadena, Texas, Robin Hood Studio in Tyler, Texas, Easter Song Studio in Garden Valley, Texas, and Omega Audio in Dallas
- Mastered at - Future Disc Systems in Hollywood by Steve Hall
- Mixing Engineer - Ron Capone
- Mixed at - Westwind in Westlake Village, California
- Cover and inside art - Mark Pendergrass

=== Characters ===
- Mr. Conductor - Wayne Zeitner
- Stevie - John Swartzbaugh
- Nancy - Heather Stevens
- Sloops - "Various Sloops"

=== Musicians ===
- Vocalists - Candle
- Children's Choral - Agapeland Singers
- Piano - Allen Mesko
- Drums - Pat Bautz
- Bass - Dan Smith
- Guitar - Buddy Miller
- Synthesizers - Allen Mesko and Si Simonson
- Trombonist - Doug Hinschberger
- Percussion - Gene Clover
- Concertmaster - Anshel Brusilow

== Sources ==
- 1983 Dove Award winners
- 1983 Grammy Award nominees
