= Jimmy and Carol Owens =

American songwriting and author couple

Jimmy and Carol Owens were an American husband and wife songwriting and author team. They are best known for the Christian children's album, Ants'hillvania, which was nominated for the 23rd annual Grammy Award for Best Children's Album in 1981.

Jimmy and Carol were married in 1954. Both of their children are in ministry: Jamie Owens Collins is a musician, songwriter and speaker. Buddy Owens is an author and a teaching pastor at Saddleback Church in Lake Forest, California. Jimmy and Carol received the Christian Artists Music Achievement Award in 1986. Jimmy was inducted into the Mississippi Musicians Hall of Fame in 2001. Their God Songs: How to Write and Select Songs for Worship, co-authored by Paul Baloche, was given the WorshipMusic.com Book of the Year Award in 2005.

The Owens worked with many singers and songwriters, either individually or together, including: Randy Stonehill, Pat Boone, Jack Hayford, Andraé Crouch, Annie Herring, 2nd Chapter of Acts, Barry McGuire, The Imperials, Larnelle Harris and more.

Jimmy Owens died on November 26, 2023, at the age of 93.

Carol died on March 11, 2023.

== Selective bibliography ==
Musicals

- Show Me!: A Love and Concern Musical (1971)
- Come Together: A Musical Experience in Love (1972)
- If My People: A Musical Experience in Worship and Intercession (1974)
- The Witness: A Musical (1978)
- The Glory of Christmas: A Musical (1980)
- Ants'hillvania (1981)
- Ants'hillvania II: The Honeydew Adventure (1983)
- The Victor (1984)
- Come Together Again: A Musical Experience in Worship and Commitment (1986)
- Heal Our Land: Praise and Prayer to Change a Nation (1995)

Books

- Words and Music: A Guide to Writing, Selecting and Enjoying Christian Songs (1984) ISBN 3-01-000673-X
- God Songs: How to Write & Select Songs for Worship Written with Paul Baloche (2005) ISBN 1-933150-03-3
- Restoring a Nation's Foundations: Prayer Strategies and Action Plans (2007) ISBN 978-1-59979-224-8
- Pre-Prayer-ing the Way: A Prayer Manual for Outreach teams (2012) ISBN 978-0-9850953-0-7
- Sussex Cove: A Novel of Suspense (2012) ISBN 978-0-9850953-2-1
