= Slow Dark Train =

Studio album by Vigilantes of Love
- Released: 1997
- Label: Capricorn
- Producer: Bill Mallonee, Danny Horrid, Dan Russell

Vigilantes of Love chronology
V.O.L. (1996)	Slow Dark Train (1997)	To the Roof of the Sky (1998)

Slow Dark Train is an album by the American band Vigilantes of Love, released in 1997. Some Christian stores refused to carry the album due to the inclusion of "Love Cocoon", a song about marital sex. The band supported the album with a North American tour.

== Production ==
The album was produced by Bill Mallonee, Danny Horrid, and Dan Russell. "Love Cocoon" first appeared on the band's debut album, Jugular.

== Critical reception ==
Professional ratings
Review scores
Source	Rating
AllMusic	4/5 stars
The Atlanta Journal-Constitution	C+
The Encyclopedia of Popular Music	3/5 stars
MusicHound Rock: The Essential Album Guide	3/5 stars
Windsor Star	A

The Dallas Observer wrote that "Vigilantes of Love is a unique blend of (American) rock 'n' roll and thoughtful spirituality that doesn't let its higher ambition get in the way of rocking the house." The Atlanta Journal-Constitution thought that the band's "ongoing romance with roots-rock turns into blind adoration here, as head Vigilante Bill Mallonee checks his usually intricate lyrics and pop sensibilities for the offhand, roadhouse vibe of Son Volt or Wilco."

The Windsor Star stated that the album "delivers messages of hope, commitment, and inner strength through Mallonee's subtle Christian beliefs." The Dayton Daily News called it a "wrenching, poignant, anguished and a terrific piece of work."

AllMusic deemed the album "all highlights."

== Track listing ==
No.	Title	Length
1.	"Locust Years"
2.	"Tokyo Rose"
3.	"Black Crow"
4.	"Only a Scratch"
5.	"Taking On Water"
6.	"Points of My Departure"
7.	"All the Mercy We Have Found"
8.	"Version of the Truth"
9.	"Sitting"
10.	"Willingly"
11.	"Facsimile"
12.	"Love Cocoon"
13.	"Hang on Every Word"
14.	"Judas Skin"
