= Ants'hillvania =

Studio album
- Released: 1981
- Recorded: 1981
- Genres: Children's music, Christian music
- Labels: Sparrow Records; BWC-2030, BWR-2030
- Producer: Dan Collins

chronology
Ants'hillvania (1981)	Ants'hillvania II: The Honeydew Adventure (1983)

Ants'hillvania is a Sparrow Records production that was written by Jimmy and Carol Owens with Cherry Boone O'Neil and produced by Dan Collins. It is well known for being full of "Ant" puns. It was nominated for a Grammy Award for Best Album for Children for the Grammy Awards of 1981.

It uses the Bible's "Parable of the Sower" and "Parable of the Prodigal Son" to tell the story of a colony of ants and the misadventures of a particular ant named Antony. Antony's story was continued in the sequel titled Ants'hillvania II: The Honeydew Adventure.

== Plot ==
The track tells the story of an ant colony in a beautiful forest called Ants'hillvania (a pun on Pennsylvania). The colony is filled with kind, fun-loving, and virtuous ants, led by their village leader, the CommandAnt. The ants value work and each other, and live by "the Wisdom from Above", or in other words, the word of God, which keeps their colony together through hard times.

However, the CommandAnt's young teenage son, Antony, is restless and tired of the same old settings of his life, and strives to explore the world and become rich and famous without expending labor and looking out for number one. The CommandAnt, though disappointed with this change of events, gives Antony his trust and gives his son his inheritance.

Antony sets out on a journey through the wood. Two of his friends, Briant and Samanttha, join him in his quest, and throughout their journey, they learn the meaning of what is right and more about the Wisdom from Above.

== Track listing ==
1. "Ants'hillvania"
2. "Work Song"
3. "Independ-Ants Song"
4. "All It Really Is"
5. "Mr. Worm"
6. "Seeds"
7. "The Choice Is Up To You"
8. "The Toast of the Town"
9. "The Riddle"
10. "Repent-Ants Song"
11. "Come On Home"
12. "Antshillvania Reprise"

== Personnel ==
- Antony: Wendell Burton
- CommandAnt: Pat Boone
- Millicent Millipede: Jamie Owens-Collins
- Story teller: James Hampton
- Arranged By, Conductor: Jimmy Owens
- Producer: Dan Collins
- Bryant: Patty Gramling
- Cecilia: Ane Weber
- Dee Dragon Fly: Barry McGuire
- Mr. Worm: Mike Milligan
- Pop: Mark Pendergrass
- Sam: Nathan Carlson
- Samantha: Betsy Hernandez
- Seymour: Dan Collins
