= Bullfrogs and Butterflies II =

1985 Christian children's album

Bullfrogs and Butterflies II: God Loves Fun

Studio album by Candle
- Released: 1985
- Recorded: 1985
- Genres: Children's music, Christian music
- Labels: Birdwing records BWR-2078, BWC-2078

Candle chronology
Bullfrogs and Butterflies (1978)	''Bullfrogs and Butterflies II: God Loves Fun'' (1985)	Bullfrogs and Butterflies III: God is Great (1987)

Bullfrogs and Butterflies II (AKA Bullfrogs and Butterflies Part II: God Loves Fun) (1985) is the second album in the Dove Award winning Christian children's series called Bullfrogs and Butterflies. It is set in Agapeland, and is an offshoot of the Agapeland album. This album was nominated for the 1985 Grammy Award for "Best Recording for Children," and it won the 1985 Dove award for "Children's Music Album of the Year."

Featured vocalists include: Betsy Hernandez, Frank Hernandez, Ron Krueger, Buddy Miller, Julie Miller, Mike Milligan, and Mark Pendergrass.

== Track listing ==
1. "Oh Me Oh My"
2. "A Great Big God"
3. "God Likes Fun"
4. "Diamond in the Rough"
5. "Gifts in My Heart"
6. "Make a Noise"
7. "King of My Heart"
8. "Today is My Favorite Day"
9. "I Love You, Lord"
10. "Everything I See"
11. "Shout Hallelujah"
12. "The Lions Weren't Hungry Last Night"
13. "Friends Forever"

== Sources ==
- 1985 Dove Award winners
- 1985 Grammy Award nominees
