= Sweet Talk and Good Lies =

Studio album by Heather Myles
- Released: 2002
- Genre: Country
- Label: Rounder
- Producer: Michael Dumas; Heather Myles

Heather Myles chronology
Highways and Honky Tonks (1998)	Sweet Talk and Good Lies (2002)

Sweet Talk and Good Lies is the fifth album by Heather Myles, released in 2002. Highlights include "Nashville's Gone Hollywood", "Sweet Little Dangerous", and "Little Chapel", a duet with fellow honky-tonker Dwight Yoakam.

== Track listing ==
1. "Sweet Talk and Good Lies" (Heather Myles) – 3:12
2. "Nashville's Gone Hollywood" (Heather Myles) – 2:57
3. "Never Had a Broken Heart" (Heather Myles) – 4:13
4. "One Man Woman Again" (Heather Myles) – 3:04
5. "Little Chapel" [with Dwight Yoakam] (Heather Myles) – 2:57
6. "By the Time I Get to Phoenix" (Jimmy Webb) – 2:48
7. "One and Only Lover" (Heather Myles) – 2:31
8. "Big Cars" (Heather Myles) – 3:30
9. "The Love You Left Behind" (Heather Myles) – 3:11
10. "If the Truth Hurts" (Heather Myles) – 2:21
11. "Homewrecker Blues" (Heather Myles) – 2:48
12. "Sweet Little Dangerous" (Heather Myles) – 3:01
13. "Cry Me a River" (Arthur Hamilton) – 2:57
