= Sweet Little Dangerous: Live at the Bottom Line =

Sweet Little Dangerous

Live album by Heather Myles
- Released: 1996
- Venue: The Bottom Line, Shepherd's Bush, London, England
- Genre: Country
- Label: Demon
- Producer: Nick Killian; Neil Brockbank

Heather Myles chronology
Untamed (1995)	Sweet Little Dangerous (1996)	Highways and Honky Tonks (1998)

Sweet Little Dangerous is the third album by Heather Myles, recorded live on August 9, 1995, at the Bottom Line in Shepherd's Bush, London, England. Most of its songs are live versions of studio recordings on her other albums, both past and future. She also covers "When the Tingle Becomes a Chill", which she calls her "all-time favorite Loretta Lynn song" .

== Track listing ==
1. Introduction / "Read You All Wrong" [live] (Heather Myles) – 2:56
2. "Gonna Have Love" [live] (Buck Owens/Red Simpson) – 2:22
3. "Other Side of Town" [live] (Heather Myles) – 3:25
4. "Sweet Little Dangerous" [live] (Heather Myles) – 3:02
5. "If the Truth Hurts" [live] (Heather Myles) – 2:20
6. "True Love Won't Let You Down" [live] (Heather Myles) – 3:25
7. "Lovin' the Bottle" [live] (Gary Brandin) – 2:28
8. "When the Tingle Becomes a Chill" [live] (Lola Jean Dillon) – 3:10
9. "Love Me a Little Bit Longer" [live] (Heather Myles) – 2:28
10. "Rum and Rodeo" [live] (Heather Myles) – 4:12
11. "Worried Wife Blues" [live] (Heather Myles/Denise Hart) – 4:25
12. "Changes" [live] (Heather Myles) – 3:41
13. "Walk Through This World with Me" [live] (Sandra Seamons/Kay Savage) – 3:07
14. "Cadillac Cowboy" [live] (Heather Myles) – 2:43
