= Blue Pony =

Studio album by Julie Miller
- Released: 1997
- Length: 46:07
- Label: HighTone
- Producer: Julie Miller, Buddy Miller

Julie Miller chronology
Invisible Girl (1994)	Blue Pony (1997)	Broken Things (1999)

Blue Pony is an album by the American musician Julie Miller, released in 1997. It was Miller's first album of secular music.

Miller supported the album by touring with Emmylou Harris.

== Production ==
The album was produced by Julie and Buddy Miller. It was recorded in the Millers' Nashville dining room. Steve Earle sang on "I Call on You", Emmylou Harris on "Forever My Beloved". "Face of Appalachia" is a cover of the John Sebastian/Lowell George song. "Dancing Girl" is about child prostitution in Thailand.

== Critical reception ==
Professional ratings
Review scores
Source	Rating
AllMusic	4.5/5 stars
The Atlanta Journal-Constitution	A
Entertainment Weekly	A
Los Angeles Daily News	4/4 stars
MusicHound Rock: The Essential Album Guide	4/5 stars

The Washington Post wrote that "the songs are given mostly acoustic, string-band arrangements that take on a chamber-music flavor when violinist Tammy Rogers or cellist Matt Slocum join in." Entertainment Weekly deemed the album "one of the year’s most haunting surprises," writing that Miller is "armed with dark, poetic lyrics about betrayal, redemption, and the damage caused by long-held secrets." The Los Angeles Times called it "a touching, poetic album that is among the year's strongest progressive-country releases."

The Atlanta Journal-Constitution determined that, "with a winsome voice pitched somewhere between innocence and experience, Julie Miller's debut is smart, heartfelt and catchy as hell." The Los Angeles Daily News opined that "Miller's gorgeous record has a steely center." The Philadelphia Inquirer labeled it "a mix of exquisite songwriting, Appalachian yearning and up-to-the-minute ethereality."

AllMusic called the album "a wonderful slice of contemporary country that draws heavily on both folk and rock music."

== Track listing ==
No.	Title	Length
1.	"A Kiss on the Lips"	5:13
2.	"Take Me Back"	3:52
3.	"By Way of Sorrow"	2:52
4.	"Dancing Girl"	4:05
5.	"Give Me an Ocean"	3:18
6.	"All the Pieces of Mary"	3:43
7.	"The Devil Is an Angel"	3:05
8.	"Letters to Emily"	4:28
9.	"I Call on You"	4:28
10.	"Face of Appalachia"	4:16
11.	"Forever My Beloved"	2:25
12.	"Blue Pony"	3:26
13.	"Last Song"	0:58
Total length:		46:07
