= Chelle Rose =

American singer

- Birth name: Rachelle Rhea Rose
- Born: Knoxville, Tennessee
- Genres: Appalachian Rock N Roll, Rock music, Americana music, Roots music
- Occupation(s): Musician, Songwriter
- Instrument(s): Vocals, Acoustic Guitar, Electric Guitar, Piano
- Years active: 2000–present
- Labels: Lil' Damsel Records
- Website: www.chellerose.com

Rachelle Rhea "Chelle" Rose is an American rock, blues, roots singer, songwriter and musician. She released her debut album, “Nanahally River” in 2000.

== Biography ==
=== Early life ===
Rose was raised by her maternal grandparents in Lenoir City, Tennessee. As a child, she sang and secretly played the piano when no one was home. She was working as an accountant when she was unexpectedly gifted a guitar, and she began singing, playing, and writing. She moved to Nashville, Tennessee in 1996, where she married, raised two children, and recorded her first album.

A diagnosis of hypothyroidism in 2014 derailed Rose's music career for more than a year, limiting her exposure. But she has since recovered, and in 2016 she bought her family's homestead and returned to Lenoir City.

=== Style ===
Rose writes autobiographical, sometimes dark songs about her childhood and the people who populated her environment in East Tennessee and western North Carolina. She was compared favorably to Lucinda Williams, Townes Van Zandt, Steve Earle, Alejandro Escovedo "and other terse, unflinching songwriters on the rock fringe of country" by Jon Pareles in the New York Times.

=== Recordings ===
Rose's 2000 debut Nanahally River was produced by David Hardman. J. D. Wilkes from the Legendary Shack Shakers played harmonica.

2012's Ghost of Browder Holler was produced by Ray Wylie Hubbard. Performers included Billy Cassis (guitar), Brad Rice (guitar, mandolin), George Reiff (bass), Rick Richards (drums), and Hubbard (guitar, harmonica). Additional guests included Ian McLagan on organ and the McCrary Sisters and Elizabeth Cook on harmonies.

Rose's third album Blue Ridge Blood was released in 2016 and produced by George Reiff (Court Yard Hounds, Chris Robinson). Buddy Miller provided harmony vocals on the title track. Once again, she was joined by Cassis, Richards, and Reiff, and she was also joined by Johnathon Hamilton (her fiancée) on mandolin, Sergio Webb on guitar and resonator guitar, Johnathan Letner on mandolin, and Bukka Allen on keyboards.

== Discography ==
- 2000: Nanahally River (Bloodred Records)
- 2012: Ghost of Browder Holler (Lil' Damsel Records)
- 2016: Blue Ridge Blood (Lil' Damsel Records)
