= Highways and Honky Tonks =

Studio album by Heather Myles
- Released: 1998
- Genre: Country
- Length: 34:55
- Label: Rounder
- Producer: Michael Dumas

Heather Myles chronology
Sweet Little Dangerous (1996)	Highways and Honky Tonks (1998)	Sweet Talk and Good Lies (2002)

Highways & Honky Tonks is the fourth album by Heather Myles, and the first with her new record company Rounder Records. There is a cover of the old Charley Pride song "Kiss an Angel Good Morning", and Merle Haggard drops in for a guest appearance on the duet "No One Is Gonna Love You Better". Myles wrote ten of the twelve songs herself.

== Reception ==
Professional ratings
Review scores
Source	Rating
AllMusic	4.5/5 stars

Billboard said that Myles "hit a home run" with Highway and Honky Tonks. Richie Unterberger of AllMusic said that while the album's lyrics were not original, Myles' honesty and performance were excellent. When reviewing the songs, No Depression believed the song that did not sound good was "No One Is Gonna Love You Better", calling it "the album's only real weak moment".

== Track listing ==
All tracks are written by Heather Myles, except "Kiss an Angel Good Morning" (Ben Peters) and "I'll Be There (If You Ever Want Me)" (Ray Price, Rusty Gabbard).

No.	Title	Length
1.	"You're Gonna Love Me One Day"	3:16
2.	"Kiss an Angel Good Morning" (Charley Pride cover)	2:34
3.	"You've Taken Me Places I Wish I'd Never Been"	2:24
4.	"Broken Heart for Sale"	3:01
5.	"True Love"	3:55
6.	"No One Is Gonna Love You Better" (with Merle Haggard)	3:16
7.	"Playin' Every Honky Tonk in Town"	2:40
8.	"Mr. Lonesome"	2:38
9.	"Rock at the End of My Rainbow"	2:30
10.	"Who Did You Call Darlin'?"	3:03
11.	"Love Me a Little Bit Longer"	3:23
12.	"I'll Be There (If You Ever Want Me)" (Ray Price cover)	2:15
Total length:		34:55
