= Untamed (Heather Myles album) =

Studio album by Heather Myles
- Released: 1995
- Genre: Country
- Label: Hightone Records
- Producer: Bruce Bromberg

Heather Myles chronology
Just Like Old Times (1992)	Untamed (1995)	Sweet Little Dangerous (1996)

Untamed is the second album by Heather Myles. Most of its songs were either written or co-written by Myles. It includes such tunes as "Cadillac Cowboy", "Indigo Moon", and a cover of the Marty Robbins tune, "Begging to You".

== Track listing ==
1. "And It Hurts" (Jack Rymes) – 3:32
2. "Just Leave Me Alone" (Eddy Raven/Sanger D. Shafer) – 2:34
3. "When You Walked Out on Me" (Heather Myles) – 3:04
4. "Cadillac Cowboy" (Heather Myles) – 2:31
5. "Until I Couldn't Have You" (Heather Myles) – 4:08
6. "Indigo Moon" (Heather Myles) – 3:07
7. "It Ain't Over" (Heather Myles) – 2:59
8. "Begging to You" (Marty Robbins) – 2:48
9. "How Could She?" (Randi Michaels) – 3:11
10. "Coming Back to Me" (Heather Myles) – 4:12
11. "Gone Too Long" (Heather Myles/Dickey Lee) – 3:20
12. "Untamed" (Heather Myles) – 3:00

== Reception ==
Professional ratings
Review scores
Source	Rating
AllMusic	3/5 stars

Richie Unterberger of AllMusic believed that while Myles's music was moderate, she did not stand out in Californian country music.
