= Just Like Old Times =

Studio album by Heather Myles
- Released: 1992
- Genre: Country
- Label: Hightone Records
- Producer: Bruce Bromberg

Heather Myles chronology
| Just Like Old Times (1992) | Úntamed (1995) |

Just Like Old Times is the debut album by singer-songwriter Heather Myles. It was released in 1992 via HighTone Records.

== Reviews ==
The album received a positive review in Billboard, which compared her vocals favorably to Loretta Lynn and Connie Smith. People was also favorable, with an uncredited review calling it "a rousing, Bakersfield-influenced sleeper by a dynamic singer."

== Track listing ==
1. "Love Lyin' Down" (Heather Myles) – 3:06
2. "Why I'm Walking" (Stonewall Jackson, Melvin Endsley) – 2:46
3. "Changes" (Heather Myles) – 3:33
4. "Rum and Rodeo" (Heather Myles) – 3:55
5. "Make a Fool Out of Me" (Heather Myles, David Amy) – 3:14
6. "The Other Side of Town" (Heather Myles) – 3:15
7. "Just Like Old Times" (David Amy, Rick Shea, Gary Brandin, Heather Myles) – 3:03
8. "Stay Out of My Arms" (Jim Lauderdale) – 2:20
9. "I Love You, Goodbye" (Heather Myles) – 3:12
10. "Lovin' the Bottle" (Gary Brandin) – 2:27
11. "One Good Reason Why" (Heather Myles, Denise Hart) – 3:52
12. "Playin' in the Dirt" (David Amy, Robert Cray) – 3:34
