= Vigilantes of Love =

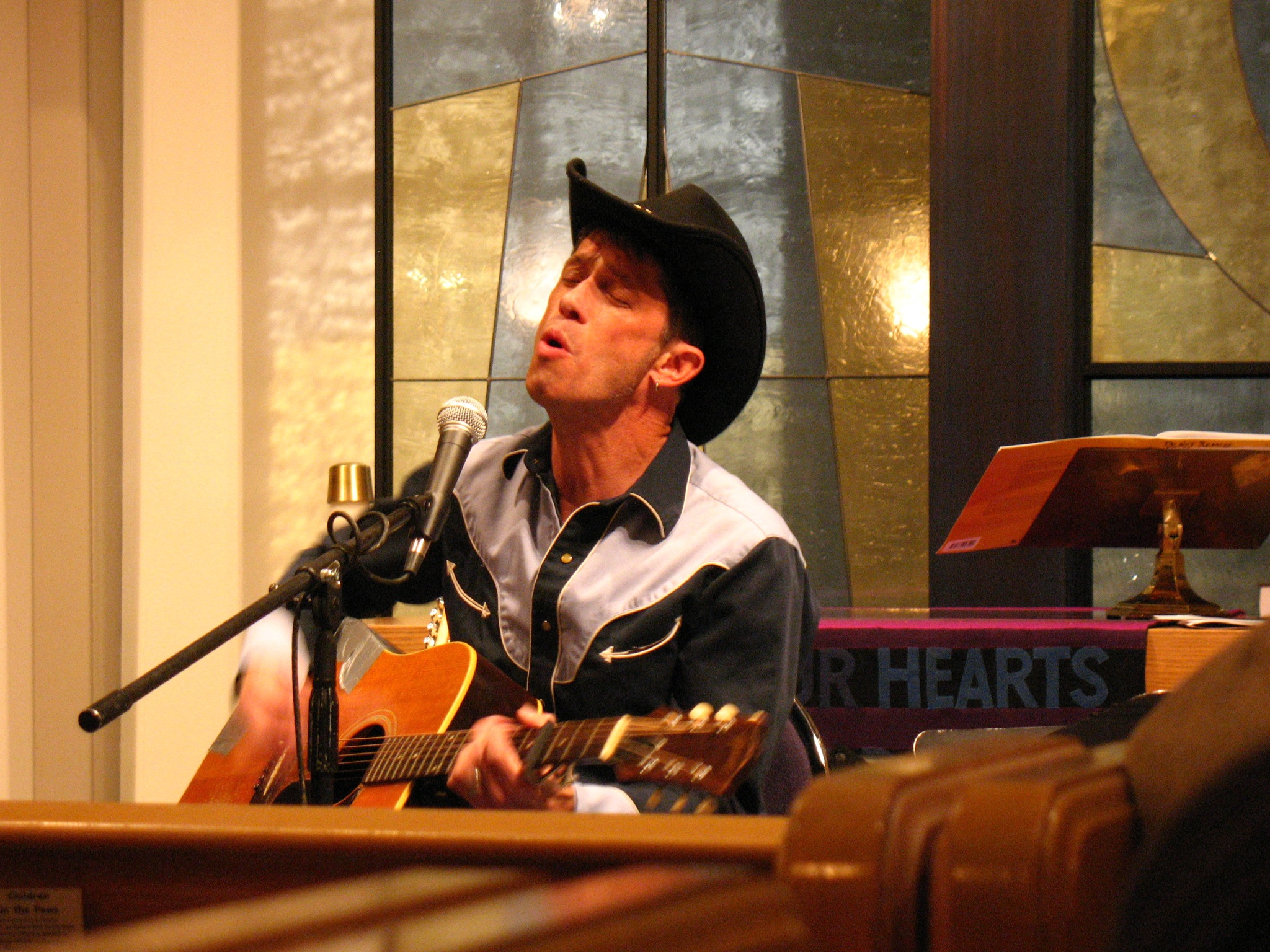
- Bill Mallonee in 2007

Background information
- Origin: Athens, Georgia, U.S.
- Genres: College rock; indie rock; Christian rock; Americana
- Years active: 1990–2001, 2008–present
- Labels: Core; Capricorn; Compass; Paste; Fundamental; Meat-market; WMG

Vigilantes of Love was an American rock band fronted by Bill Mallonee, with many secondary players drawn from the musician pool in and around Athens, Georgia, United States. In its later manifestations in the later 1990s and early 2000s, Mallonee usually sang, played lead and rhythm guitar and harmonica, although in earlier bands he played drums.

The band takes its name from the New Order song "Love Vigilantes," although their sound tends more to folk, Americana, and country rock than new wave. Their 2001 album Summershine also showed some movement toward Britpop and R.E.M.-style college rock, which would be more fully explored in Mallonee's solo career.

== History ==
The band formed in 1990 in Athens, Georgia, where Bill Mallonee attended the University of Georgia. The act developed as a mostly acoustic, side-project of The Cone Ponies, the last in a long series of line-ups beginning in the mid-1980s with Windows and Walls, and Bed of Roses. For their first two recording projects—Jugular and Drivin' the Nails—the band performed as a trio between Mallonee, Mark Hall (accordion), and Jonathan "Dog-Mess Jonny" Evans (harmonica). The Athens, Georgia, performance venues in which they were booked regularly included The Flying Buffalo, the 40-Watt Club, Rockfish Palace, Uptown Lounge, and their musical "home"—The Downstairs Restaurant (now DT's Down Under). For the third and subsequent albums, guitarist and multi-instrumentalist Billy Holmes played an increasingly important role. Later, when greater local success led increasingly to engagements more widely in the Southeast, and with the departure of Mark Hall and Dog-Mess Jonny, the band then re-formed as a traditional touring four-piece rock band including front man Mallonee, Newton Carter, David LaBruyere (later became bass player for John Mayer), and Travis McNabb (later of Better Than Ezra and Sugarland).

The band was signed to Capricorn Records following their third album, Killing Floor. Mallonee has stated that Capricorn's lack of investment in a music video to support Vigilantes made it difficult for them to break out in the broader marketplace.

With Mallonee serving as Vigilantes of Love's frontman, the band's "Double Cure" was nominated for a 1997 Dove Award in the Alternative/Modern Rock Recorded Song of the Year category. The band experienced controversy in the CCM market for the song "Love Cocoon." The song, which described marital sex, led to the band's album Slow Dark Train being dropped by some Christian bookstores.

After many years of successful touring nationally and abroad — the UK and the Netherlands being particularly fond of Mallonnee's music. The band disbanded in 2001 as Mallonee went solo as a singer-songwriter/guitarist/raconteur playing to the renewed interest in roots-music Americana.

== Band members ==
Besides Bill Mallonee, other band members have included at various times:

- Chris Bland: bass
- Jacob Bradley: guitars, bass
- Newton Carter: guitars
- Tom Crea: drums
- Chris Donohue: guitars, bass
- Jonny "Dog-Mess" Evans: harmonica
- Bob Goin: bass
- Mark Hall: accordion
- Kevin Heuer: drums
- Billy Holmes: guitars, mandolin, keyboards, bass
- Kenny Hutson: guitars, mandolin, pedal steel guitar, Dobro
- John Keane: guitars, pedal steel
- Scott Klopfenstein: drums
- David LaBruyere: bass
- Travis McNabb: drums
- Drew Grow: guitars
- Doug Nissley: mandolin
- John Mallory: guitar, bass, vocals, songwriting

== Discography ==
- Jugular (Fingerprint Records, 1990)
- Driving the Nails (Core, 1991)
- Killing Floor (Fingerprint Records/Sky, 1992) Produced by Mark Heard and Peter Buck
- Welcome to Struggleville (Capricorn, 1994)
- Strong Hand of Love, tribute to Mark Heard, 1994
- Blister Soul (Capricorn, 1995)
- My Year in Review (1995, fan club cassette)
- V.O.L. (Warner/Resound, 1996, compilation)
- Orphans of God, tribute to Mark Heard, 1996
- Slow Dark Train (Capricorn, 1997)
- Compass (EP) (January 1, 1997)
- To The Roof Of The Sky (Meat Market, 1998)
- Live At The 40 Watt (Paste, 1998)
- Free For Good (A Startled Chameleon, 1998, Europe-only release)
- Audible Sigh (True Tunes, 1999, pre-release)
- Cross the Big Pond (EP) (1999, Free For Good + extra track)
- Audible Sigh (Compass, 2000, wide release)
- Audible Sigh w/ Room Despair EP (Compass, 2000, limited release)
- Electromeo (EP) (2000, limited release)
- Summershine (Compass, 2001)
- Resplendent (Audibly Live) (2002)
- Live at the Acoustic Cafe (Fundamental, 2007)
- Slow Dark Demos: Archive Series Vol. 1
- Live at Eddie's (March 1, 2009)
- Manicphaseshifter (Live @Schuba's, Chicago, IL) (April 16, 2015)
- Need to Bleed (Expanded Edition) (January 31, 2018)

=== Video ===
- Fade to Black: Live at the Axiom Arts Centre, Cheltenham, UK 1999 (2004?)

== See also ==
- Bill Mallonee (including solo Discography)
- Buddy Miller – producer, Audible Sigh (1999)
- Music of Athens, Georgia
