= Universal United House of Prayer =

Studio album by Buddy Miller
- Released: September 21, 2004
- Recorded: May 2004
- Genre: Americana, Christian country
- Length: 50:04
- Label: New West

Buddy Miller chronology
| Midnight and Lonesome (2002) | Universal United House of Prayer (2004) | The Best of the HighTone Years (2008) |

Professional ratings
Review scores
| Source | Rating |
|---|---|
| Allmusic | 4.5/5 stars |
| Christianity Today | 4/5 stars |
| Rolling Stone | 4/5 stars |

Universal United House of Prayer is Buddy Miller's fifth solo album, and his first for New West Records. The album appeared for one week and reached No. 64 on the Billboard Top Country Albums chart. It received the 2004 Americana Music Award for Album of the Year for 2004, and contains the Mark Heard-penned song "Worry Too Much", which won the award for Song of the Year that same year.

== Track listing ==
Universal United House of Prayer track listing
| No. | Title | Writer(s) | Length |
|---|---|---|---|
| 1. | "Worry Too Much" | Mark Heard | 4:48 |
| 2. | "There's a Higher Power" | Charlie Louvin, Ira Louvin | 3:53 |
| 3. | "Shelter Me" | Buddy Miller, Julie Miller | 3:14 |
| 4. | "With God on Your Side" | Bob Dylan | 9:14 |
| 5. | "Wide River to Cross" | B. Miller, J. Miller | 3:03 |
| 6. | "Fire and Water" | B. Miller, J. Miller | 4:02 |
| 7. | "Don't Wait" | Jim Lauderdale, B. Miller | 4:37 |
| 8. | "This Old World" | B. Miller, Victoria Williams | 2:59 |
| 9. | "Is That You" | B. Miller, J. Miller | 4:52 |
| 10. | "Returning" | Lauderdale, B. Miller | 4:55 |
| 11. | "Fall on the Rock" | J. Miller | 5:02 |
| Total length: | | | 50:04 |
