= The Delevantes =

American rock band

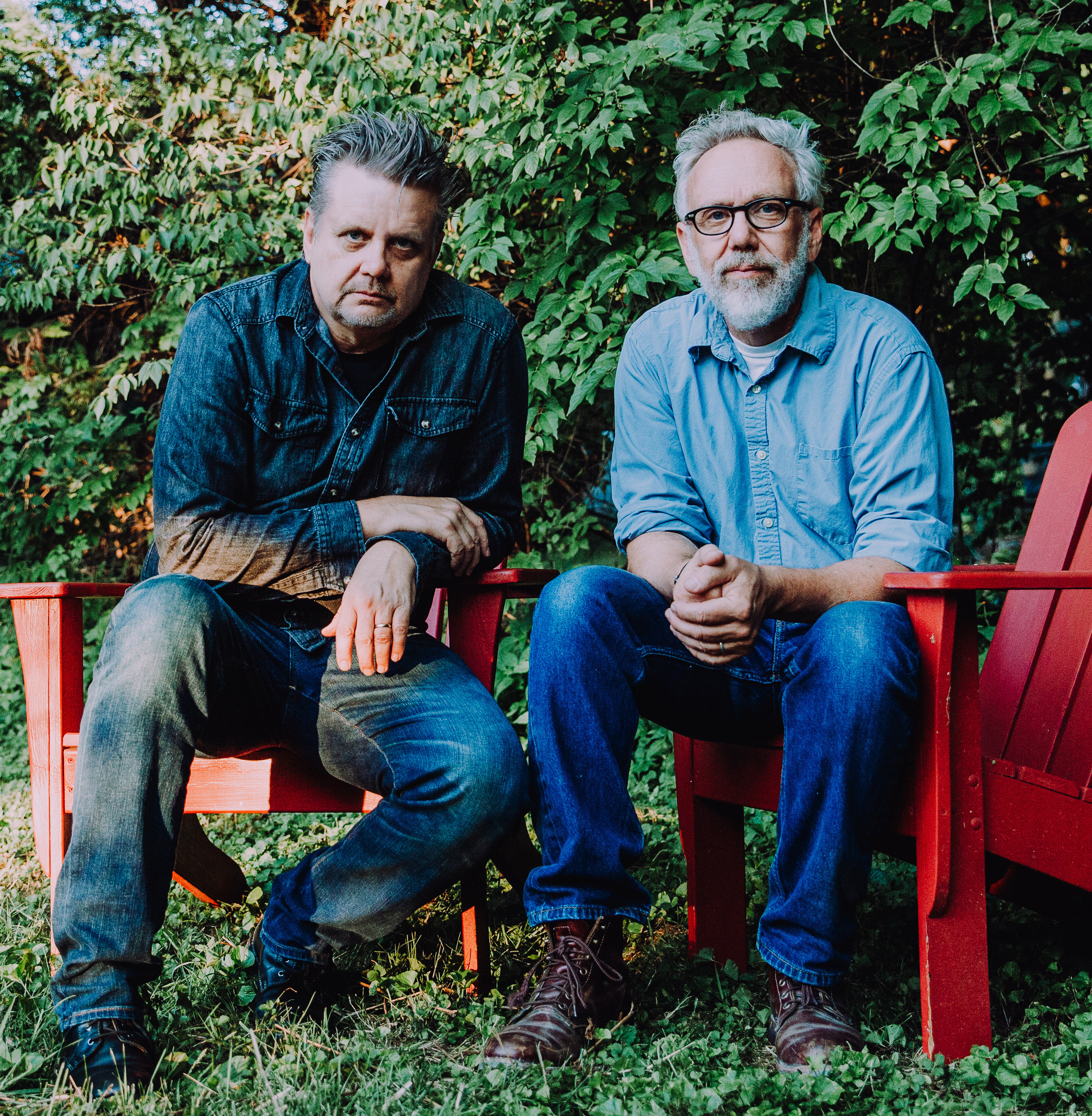
- The Delevantes in 2019

Background information
- Origin: Hoboken, New Jersey, U.S.
- Genres: Rock, Americana
- Years active: 1988-present
- Labels: Rounder, Capitol Nashville
- Members: Bob Delevante; Mike Delevante
- Website: www.thedelevantes.com

The Delevantes are an American musical duo consisting of brothers Bob and Mike Delevante from Nashville, Tennessee. The band has continuously featured E Street Band’s, Garry Tallent and, in the 1990s, Benmont Tench from Tom Petty and the Heartbreakers. They were the first band to have a number one album on the Gavin Americana Charts.

Their close harmony singing and working class narratives has drawn them comparison to, amongst others, Bruce Springsteen, The Everly Brothers, The Louvin Brothers and Creedence Clearwater Revival.

== History ==
Bob and Mike Delevante hail from Rutherford, New Jersey, the sons and grandsons of General Motors workers, and graduated from St. Mary High School. After a progression from their earlier bands, Wreckless Abandon and Who's Your Daddy?, the brothers formed The Delevantes in Hoboken, New Jersey in 1988. But, on the advice of the BMI Nashville music executive, Jody Williams, who they met in New York City at the New Music Seminar, the brothers were encouraged to relocate to Nashville in 1992.

The band released their first album, Long About That Time, in 1995 on Rounder Records. Produced by Garry Tallent, the album was given three stars by Rolling Stone Magazine and an 'A' by Entertainment Weekly. The album debuted in the sixth slot on the Gavin Americana charts thus making the group the first alt country band to reach the top ten. The album was nominated for a Nashville Music Award and received the Best Pop Album from NAIRD (The National Association of Independent Records and Distributors)

In 1997 they switched labels from Rounder to Capitol Nashville and released their second album, Postcards from Along the Way. The album was again produced by Tallent and featured both he on bass and Tench on piano. The last song on the album ‘John Wayne Lives in Hoboken’ was performed and featured on 2007: Live from Mountain Stage album.

They have shared the stage and toured with amongst others Steve Earle, John Prine, Emmylou Harris, Marshall Crenshaw, Alison Krauss and Junior Brown. In September 1997, alongside Tallent and Max Weinberg, they backed up Levon Helm for his performance of ‘Rag Mama Rag’ at a tribute to Jimmie Rodgers at the Rock and Roll Hall of Fame.

In the intervening two decades, both brothers pursued successful graphic art careers in Nashville while Bob continued writing and recording, often with Mike as a supporting musician. Bob released three albums: Porchlight (1999), Columbus and the Colossal Mistake (2006), and Valley of Days (2016).

Rejoining as The Delevantes for few local appearances in the late 2010s, such as The Long Players project, The Delevantes are again actively performing, most recently in support of Garry Tallent with Bruce Springsteen and Southside Johnny on July 9, 2019 at the Stone Pony Summer Stage in Asbury Park, New Jersey. The Stone Pony appearance catalyzed the recording of A Thousand Turns, released by Moon River Records on August 4, 2021, and produced by Tallent, The Delevantes, and multi-instrumentalist, Dave Coleman.

== Discography ==
=== Studio albums ===
Title	Album details
Long About That Time	Release date: 1995; Rounder Records
Postcards From Along The Way	Release date: 1997; Capitol Nashville
A Thousand Turns	Release date: 2021; Moon River Records

=== Music videos ===
Year	Video
1995	"Pocket Full of Diamonds"
1995	"Driving at Night"
1995	"I'm Your Man"
2021	"Little By Little"
2021	"Dear Kate"
