= Lisa Daggs =

American singer-songwriter

- Origin: California, US
- Genres: Gospel music, Christian country
- Occupations: Christian music singer, songwriter
- Instrument: Guitar
- Years active: 1991 – present
- Label: Indy

Lisa Daggs is an American Christian music singer-songwriter, producer and author based in Springfield, Tennessee. She is also a public speaker and president of Serenity Records.

== Early life ==
Lisa Daggs was born in Los Angeles, California, and raised in Sacramento by her mother after her parents were divorced when she was ten.

== Music career ==
Daggs started her career after moving to Nashville where she worked as a studio vocalist and sang in numerous showcases for local Nashville songwriters. After a stint at performing in mainstream venues, she began touring with evangelist Lowell Lundstrom. In 1991, Daggs recorded her debut CD, Who Are You.

"Walls" and "Leave Your Bags at the Door," the first singles from Daggs album, Angel in Your Eyes, hit charts in top ten publications such as Music City News, The Gospel Voice, Clear Country and Christian Country Research Bulletin. "I Wanna Thank You," the album's third release, was Daggs' first No. 1 radio charting single. She went on to top the charts with 21 No. 1 radio singles. Daggs along with her daughter, Faith Charette, were a part of the Gaither "Women of Homecoming" video and recording.

Her 2017 album, Christmas From My Heart, saw one single released in 2017 and will be fully released in the fall of 2018. Regardless, released in the fall of 2016, has seen both singles reach number 1 on the Nashville charts.

Daggs produced That's What I Do for her husband, band member, songwriter and evangelist, Ronnie Horton.

== Radio ==
Daggs hosted a radio show entitled "Reality Check" which aired on Salem Media Group's 103.9 The Fish every Sunday at 7 pm. Reality Check featured "Recovery Talk on the Radio", a faith-based recovery program which is still available via podcast located on Lisa's website at www.lisadaggs.net

== Television appearances ==
Daggs has made several appearances on the Bill Gaither Homecoming Video series. She has appeared on several mainstream television shows such as Prime Time Country and The 700 Club. Lisa recently opened the televised awards show for ICMA from the TBN stage in Nashville with her song, "Forgiveness Is A Powerful Thing".

== Awards ==
As a vocal performance artist Daggs has been honored with numerous awards, including The Gospel Voices Diamond Award for "Country Artist of the Year". She received the Christian Country Music Association's "Entertainer of the Year" and "New Artist of the Year" honors, while also being named "The Brightest Newcomer to the Scene" by the Christian Country Research Bulletin. In 2009 Daggs was among several artists to receive the Gospel Music Association's Dove Award nomination for Bill Gaither's Special Event album. She was nominated for the 2016 ICMA Living Legends Award.
