= Bill Mallonee =

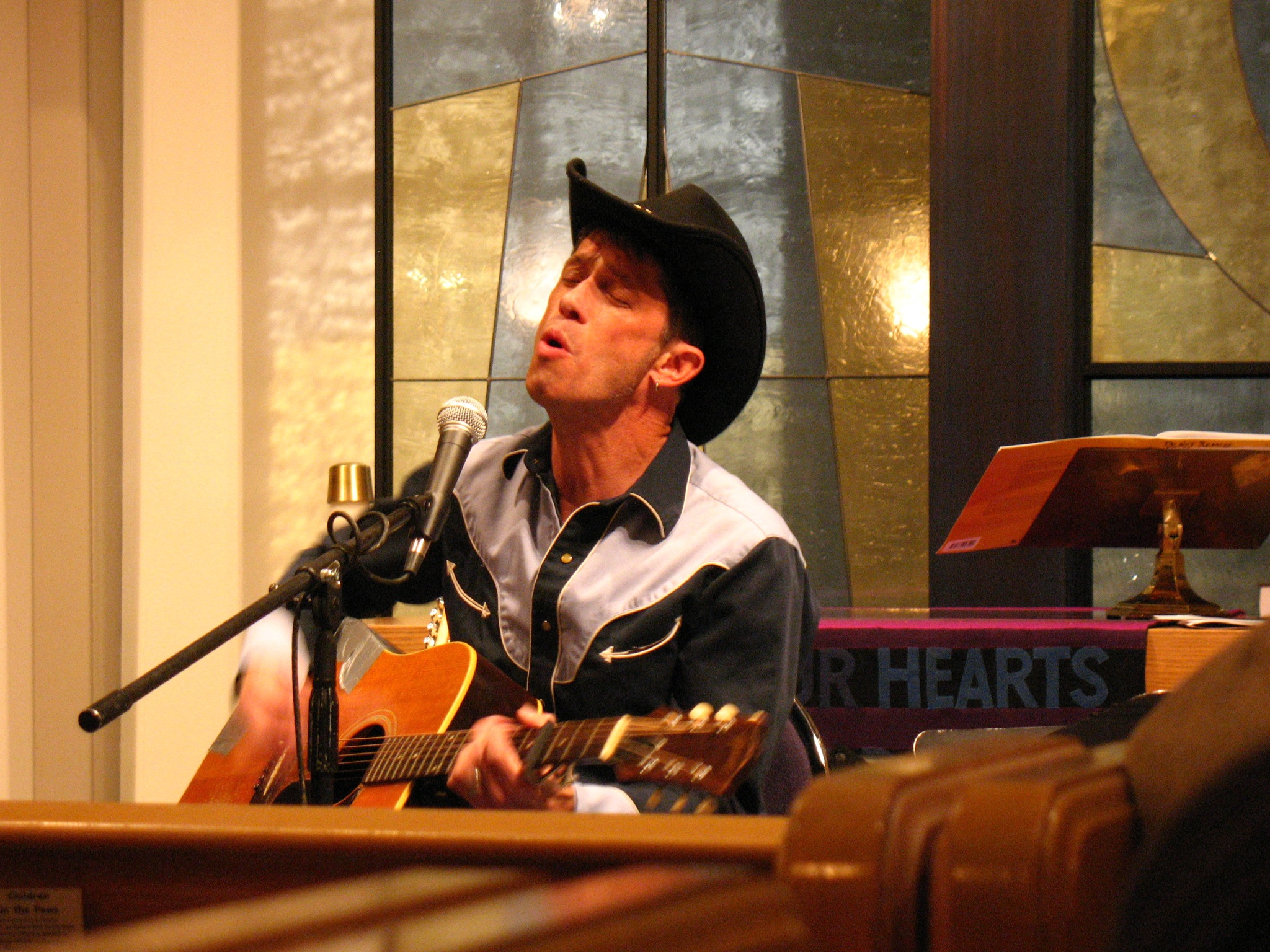
- Mallonee in 2007

Background information
- Born: January 1, 1955 (age 71)
- Genre: Americana
- Years active: 1990–present
- Labels: Paste; Startled Chameleon; Fundamental

Bill Mallonee (born 1 January 1955) is an American singer-songwriter, most notably the songwriter and leader of Vigilantes of Love (sometimes stylized V.O.L.), an Americana, alt-country, rock band from Athens, Georgia.

== Early life ==
Mallonee was born in Martinsville, Virginia, and grew up in Chapel Hill, North Carolina. He was raised Roman Catholic. He graduated with a degree in history from the University of Georgia in 1977.

== Family ==
Mallonee and his first wife, Brenda, have two sons: Joshua and Joseph.

== Health ==
Mallonee has been diagnosed with non-Hodgkin lymphoma in his abdomen.

== Musical career ==
=== Early career ===
Mallonee played drums in high school and college before turning to songwriting and lead vocals when he formed Vigilantes of Love with keyboard player Mark Hall. He later played drums for a band that consisted of Buddy Miller, Julie Miller, Lucinda Williams, and Victoria Williams.

=== Vigilantes of Love ===
With Mallonee serving as Vigilantes of Love's frontman, the band's "Double Cure" was nominated for a 1997 Dove Award in the Alternative/Modern Rock Recorded Song of the Year category. The band experienced controversy in the Contemporary Christian music (CCM) market for the song "Love Cocoon." The song, which described marital sex, led to the band's album Slow Dark Train being dropped by some Christian bookstores. Mallonee has remarked that he never felt comfortable with the CCM label.

=== Solo ===
Though the Vigilantes disbanded in 2001, Mallonee has continued to write and sing. On his mid-2007 tour, he was joined onstage by his second wife, Muriah Rose, who plays keyboards and sings. The two have continued to tour together ever since. Throughout his career many of his songs have focused on his Christian faith and his family. Critically speaking, he is held in high regard as a songwriter, being named one of the 100 greatest living songwriters by Paste Magazine.

=== Songwriting influences and process ===
Mallonee has cited Woody Guthrie and Jack Kerouac as influences on his songwriting.

Mallonee describes his songwriting process as starting with playing sounds on the guitar, then crafting a melody, then building around a lyric.

== Discography ==
- Fetal Position (Paste) (June 30, 2002)
- Go and Ask Her (Startled Chameleon, UK release) (April 1, 1999)
- Locket Full of Moonlight (Paste, 2002)
- My Year in Review (June 1, 2002, remastered and revised from 1995 VoL release)
- Locket Full of Moonlight (Fundamental UK) (December 16, 2002)
- Perfumed Letter (Paste) (January 1, 2004)
- Dear Life (Fundamental) (July 26, 2004)
- Friendly Fire (Fundamental) (January 1, 2005)
- Hit and Run (January 1, 2005)
- Yonder Shines The Infant Light (December 12, 2005, Christmas)
- Permafrost (August 8, 2006)
- Stolen Kisses & Other Thefts (September 10, 2006)
- Circa (June 1, 2007)
- lower case (mini ep) (2008)
- Recent Demos (October 1, 2008)
- Works (in) Progress Administration Vol. 1 (October 1, 2008)
- Works (in) Progress Administration Vol. 2 (January 20, 2009)
- Works (in) Progress Administration Vol. 3: Farthest Edge of Town (April 8, 2009)
- Works (in) Progress Administration Vol. 4: Break in the Clouds (June 15, 2009)
- Works (in) Progress Administration Vol. 5: Cabin Songs (November 17, 2009)
- Works (in) Progress Administration Vol. 6: Rural Route (December 22, 2009)
- Works (in) Progress Administration Vol. 7: Eternal Dawn & Gloaming (March 10, 2010)
- Works (in) Progress Administration Vol. 8: Coal Dust Soul (June 9, 2010)
- Works (in) Progress Administration Vol. 9: Drifter Songs (January 2011)
- Works (in) Progress Administration Vol. 10: High Desert Hope (April 2011)
- Songs of Heartland & Grieving (April 22, 2011)
- Works (in) Progress Administration Vol. 11: Kid Heart (August 2011)
- Ti Jean (Hearts Crossing the Center Line): Songs Inspired by the writings of Jack Kerouac (January 14, 2011)
- Last Days/Early Mars (September 11, 2011)
- The Power and the Glory (October 2, 2011)
- Wonderland (December 16, 2011, Christmas)
- Works (in) Progress Administration Vol. 13: Hard-Scrabble Dreams (March 9, 2012)
- Works (in) Progress Administration Vol. 14: Pale Lights Off Starboard (July 15, 2012)
- Amber Waves (November 24, 2012)
- Crier (December 20, 2012, Christmas)
- Renderings (A WPA Vols. 1-4 Retrospective) (January 10, 2013)
- Works (in) Progress Administration Vol. 15: Ghost Waltz (February 22, 2013)
- Works (in) Progress Administration Vol. 16: Wanderlust (March 21, 2013)
- Works (in) Progress Administration Vol. 17: This Is the Part Where We Kiss Good-Bye (March 27, 2013)
- Beatitude (June 7, 2013)
- The Nashville NPR Sessions (August 7, 2013)
- Town Hall (September 6, 2013)
- Dolorosa (November 12, 2013)
- "Little Births"/The Dolorosa Demos (January 24, 2014)
- Works (in) Progress Administration Vol. 18: Heaven In Your Heart (July 4, 2013)
- Pauper Dreams (August 18, 2003)
- Starlight O'er High Desert (EP) (December 16, 2013, Christmas)
- Demonstrative (The Amber Waves & Beatitude Demos) April 9, 2014)
- Winnowing (August 20, 2014)
- Lands & Peoples (May 1, 2015)
- Where the Love Light Gleams (December 18, 2015, Christmas)
- In the New Dark Age (13 Seeds of Hope & Other Perishables) (January 6, 2016)
- Songs for the Journey & Beyond (January 15, 2016)
- Future Hymns for the New Idolatry (January 22, 2016)
- Works (in) Progress Administration Vol. 19: Footnotes For Departure (WPA Compilation, Vol. 2) (January 28, 2016)
- New York State of Mind (7 Studio Songs from the City) (February 3, 2016)
- Slow Trauma (March 15, 2016)
- Mule (November 18, 2016)
- The Rags of Absence (January 2, 2017)
- Audible Sigh/Solo Acoustic Renderings 1998 (September 29, 2017)
- Forest Full of Wolves (January 27, 2018)
- Orphan Songs (March 16, 2018)
- Lead On, Kindly Light (2020)
- This World & One More (2020)
- A Clamoring of Ghosts (2021)
- Here It Opens With A Prayer, But It Closes With A Song (2022)
- Glimmer Vol I (May 2024)
- Glimmer Vol II (Oct 2024)
