= Brigitte DeMeyer =

American singer-songwriter

Brigitte DeMeyer is an American singer-songwriter. Her music has Americana, blues, folk, country and gospel-music influences. She is known for her "spicy vocal delivery".

== Early life and education ==
DeMeyer grew up in Point Loma, San Diego, where she attended Point Loma High School. She earned a degree in International Relations from University of San Diego in 1986.

== Career ==
DeMeyer started her musical career in San Diego and was mentored by long-time San Diego musician Steve Poltz as well as the Beat Farmers' singer and guitarist Joey Harris. Before going solo, she was a member of the Pink Expectations and of Mojo Nixon's Syndicate of Soul band. She has opened for acts such as Bob Dylan, Dan Fogelberg, and Hall & Oates.

Since 2001, she has released six solo albums. Her 2014 album, Savannah Road, was inspired by Gregg Allman and has received attention on SiriusXM's Outlaw Country channel. In January 2017, she released Mockingbird Soul, a duet album with singer-guitarist Will Kimbrough.

== Personal life ==
DeMeyer is married and has a son. She lived in San Francisco from 1986 until 2010, when she moved to Nashville.

== Discography ==
- Brigitte DeMeyer (2001). Another Thousand Miles (Audio CD). Brigitte DeMeyer.
- Brigitte DeMeyer (2003). Nothing Comes Free (Audio CD). BDM Music.
- Brigitte DeMeyer (2006). Something After All (Audio CD). BDM Music.
- Brigitte DeMeyer (2009). The Red River Flower (Audio CD). BDM Music.
- Brigitte DeMeyer (2011). Rose of Jericho (Audio CD). BDM Music.
- Brigitte DeMeyer (2014). Savannah Road (Audio CD). BDM Music.
- Brigitte DeMeyer; Will Kimbrough (2017). Mockingbird Soul (Audio CD). MRI.
