= Written in Chalk =

Studio album by Buddy & Julie Miller
- Released: March 3, 2009
- Genres: Folk, Country, Americana
- Label: New West
- Producers: Buddy & Julie Miller

Buddy & Julie Miller chronology
Buddy & Julie Miller (2001)	Written in Chalk (2009)

Professional ratings
Aggregate scores
Source	Rating
Metacritic	81/100
Review scores
Source	Rating
AllMusic	4/5 stars
The Guardian	3/5 stars
Los Angeles Times	4/4 stars
Mojo	4/5 stars
Paste	8.4/10
PopMatters	7/10
Rolling Stone	4/5 stars
Spin	7/10
Uncut	4/5 stars
Under the Radar	7/10

Written in Chalk is an album by Buddy and Julie Miller, released in 2009. It won numerous awards at the 2009 Americana Music Association awards: Album of the Year and the song "Chalk" won the Song of the Year. Buddy Miller won Artist of the Year and the duo won Duo/Group of the Year.

The album art is a painting by Brian Kershisnik.

== Track listing ==
- All songs by Julie Miller unless otherwise noted.
1. "Ellis County" – 3:51
2. "Gasoline and Matches" (Julie Miller, Buddy Miller) – 3:14
3. "Don't Say Goodbye"– 5:10
4. "What You Gonna Do Leroy" (Mel Tillis) – 3:45
5. "Long Time" – 4:13
6. "One Part, Two Part" (Dee Ervin) – 3:43
7. "Chalk" – 3:40
8. "Everytime We Say Goodbye" – 4:34
9. "Hush, Sorrow" – 4:02
10. "Memphis Jane" – 6:16
11. "June" – 4:15
12. "The Selfishness in Man" (Leon Payne) – 4:20

== Personnel ==
- Julie Miller – vocals, guitar, background vocals
- Buddy Miller – vocals, guitar, background vocals
- Emmylou Harris – vocals
- Patty Griffin – vocals
- Robert Plant – vocals ("What You Gonna Do Leroy")
- Larry Campbell – fiddle, mandolin
- John Deaderick – piano, keyboards
- Chris Donohue – bass
- Stuart Duncan – fiddle
- Dennis Crouch – bass
- Byron House – bass
- Brady Blade, Jr. – drums
- Jay Bellerose – drums
- Byran Owings – drums
- Kami Lyle – trumpet
- Matt Rollings – piano
- Gurf Morlix – lap steel guitar
- Russ Pahl – pedal steel guitar
- Ann McCrary – background vocals
- Regina McCrary – background vocals

== Chart positions ==
Year	Chart	Position
2009	Billboard Top Heatseekers	3
2009	Billboard Top Independent Albums	21
