= Buddy & Julie Miller =

Studio album by Buddy & Julie Miller
- Released: September 18, 2001
- Genre: Folk, country, Americana
- Length: 42:40
- Label: Hightone
- Producer: Buddy & Julie Miller

Buddy & Julie Miller chronology
Buddy & Julie Miller (2001)	Written in Chalk (2009)

Professional ratings
Review scores
Source	Rating
AllMusic	3/5 stars

Buddy & Julie Miller is a 2001 album by Buddy and Julie Miller. Prior to this recording the husband and wife singer-songwriters had each made appearances on the other's solo recordings, but this disc marked their first official release as a duo. The music has been described as more rock based than their earlier, traditional-folk recordings. The majority of the songs were penned by Julie and rounded out by the duo's co-write, "Dirty Water" and covers of songs by Richard Thompson, Utah Phillips and Bob Dylan.

The album was well received by critics and fans of Americana/folk music. It was named "Album of the Year" at the first annual awards of the Americana Music Association. The album was the 17th most played recording of 2001 by FolkDJ-L DJs and the 4th most played disc in September 2001. The album also reached the number two spot on the Freeform American Roots Chart.

== Track listing ==
1. "Keep Your Distance" (Richard Thompson) – 3:49
2. "The River's Gonna Run" (Julie Miller) – 3:59
3. "You Make My Heart Beat Too Fast" (Julie Miller) – 3:12
4. "Forever Has Come to an End" (Julie Miller) – 2:50
5. "Little Darlin" (Julie Miller) – 3:31
6. "Rock Salt and Nails" (Bruce "Utah" Phillips) – 4:17
7. "Dirty Water" (Buddy & Julie Miller) – 6:53
8. "Wallflower" (Bob Dylan) – 2:55
9. "That's Just How She Cries" (Julie Miller) – 4:17
10. "Rachel" (Julie Miller) – 3:43
11. "Holding Up the Sky" (Julie Miller) – 3:08

== Personnel ==
- Gina R. Binkley – Design
- Brady Blade Jr. – Drums
- Larry Campbell – Fiddle
- Derri Daugherty– Engineer
- Emmylou Harris – Vocals
- Jim Herrington – Photography
- Byron House – Bass
- Phil Madeira – Hammond organ
- Julie Miller – Guitar, producer, Trash Cans
- Bryan Owings – Drums
- Rick Plant – Bass
- Tammy Rogers – Mandolin
- Joey Spampinato – Bass
- Garry Tallent – Bass

== Chart performance ==
Chart (2000)	Peak position
US Heatseekers Albums (Billboard)	41
US Top Country Albums (Billboard)	45
