= Heather Myles =

American singer-songwriter

- Born: July 31, 1962 (age 63)
- Origin: Riverside, California, United States
- Genres: Country
- Occupation: Singer
- Years active: 1992–present
- Labels: HighTone; Demon; Rounder

Heather Myles (born July 31, 1962) is an American country music singer, with a honky-tonk Bakersfield sound.

== Early life ==
Myles was born in Riverside, California, United States, where her parents bred and trained horses for racing. Heather had a job in the family business until the lure of the honky-tonks called her away.

While still in her teens, she joined a band, and within a year, they had a contract with HighTone.

== Career ==
Myles has released five studio albums, including two on HighTone, two on Rounder, and one on the Me and My Americana Roots label.

Her 1992 debut album, Just Like Old Times, contained mostly original compositions, along with songs from Jim Lauderdale and Robert Cray, and was followed by Untamed in 1995.

Her third studio album, Highways and Honkytonks, was released in 1998, and featured a duet with Merle Haggard on "No One is Gonna Love You Better".

In 2002, her Sweet Talk and Good Lies included a duet with Dwight Yoakam on the song "Little Chapel".

Released in 2009, In the Wind was co-produced by Taras Prodaniuk (Dwight Yoakam, Lucinda Williams), who also played bass. They were accompanied by Larry Mitchell and Jim Christie (drums), and Bob Gothar (guitar).

== Discography ==
=== Studio albums ===
- 1992: Just Like Old Times (HighTone)
- 1995: Untamed (HighTone) released on Demom in Europe
- 1998: Highways and Honky Tonks (Rounder)
- 2002: Sweet Talk and Good Lies (Rounder)
- 2009: In the Wind (Me and My American Roots) also released in 2011 by Ah Ha Music Group

=== Live albums ===
- 1996: Sweet Little Dangerous (Demon)
- 2008: Live @ Newland, NL (Me and My American Roots)
- 2013: Live on TruCountry (Floating World Records)

=== Compilations ===
- 2005: Rum and Rodeo (HighTone)

=== Singles ===
Year	Single	Peak positions	Album
Year	Single	US Country	Album
1998	"True Love"	—	Highways & Honky Tonks
1999	"Love Me a Little Bit Longer"	75	Highways & Honky Tonks
2002	"Never Had a Broken Heart"	—	Sweet Talk and Good Lies
2010	"Mama's a Star"	—	In the Wind
2011	"Pretty Poison"	—	In the Wind
"—" denotes releases that did not chart

=== Music videos ===
Year	Video	Director
1996	"Changes"	Dana Green
1998	"True Love"	Jean Pellerin
1999	"Love Me a Little Bit Longer"	Carl Himmelman
