= Julie Miller =

American singer-songwriter (born 1956)

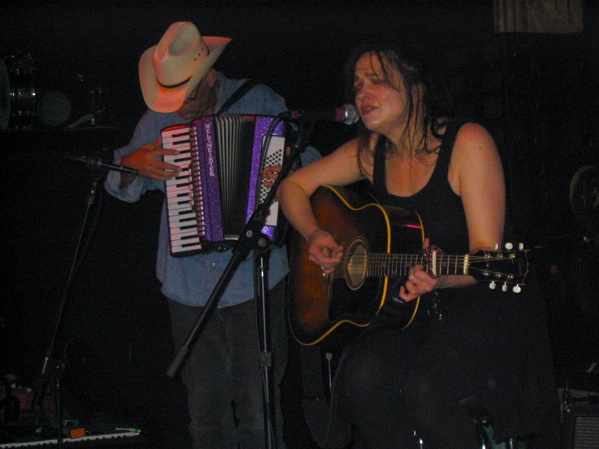
- Miller with Phil Madeira, 2004

Background information
- Born: Julie Griffin; July 12, 1956 (age 70); Waxahachie, Texas, U.S.
- Genres: CCM, country, alt-country
- Occupations: Singer, songwriter
- Instruments: Vocals, guitar
- Years active: 1983–present
- Labels: Myrrh, Street Level, HighTone
- Spouse: Buddy Miller
- Website: buddymiller.com

Julie Anne Miller (born Julie Griffin, July 12, 1956) is an American songwriter, singer, and recording artist living in Nashville, Tennessee. She married Buddy Miller in 1981. They sing and play on each other's solo projects and have recorded several duet albums.

== Career ==
=== Recordings ===
Julie Miller's first professionally released recording was with the group Streetlight which consisted of Julie, Buddy Miller, and Ron Krueger. The self-titled album was released in 1983. Julie and Buddy wrote some songs for the LP, including the original version of "Jesus in Your Eyes" (later re-recorded for Orphans and Angels). "How Could You Say No" (written by Mickey Cates) was originally performed on this album and later included on Julie's solo debut Meet Julie Miller.

A 1985 demo tape recorded by Julie listed eight songs, but contained eleven. Two of these songs were later included on Meet Julie Miller, but the remaining nine songs were not reissued. Songs on this tape include: "I Don't Need Anything Else", "Mystery Love" (Synth Pop Version), "Love Is", "I Look to You", "I Don't Need", "What Does it Take", "I Wanna Be Ready", "King of my Heart" (not the same as that which appeared later on her first Myrrh release), "My New Psychiatrist" (Synth Pop Version with different lyrics), "Debby Came Back", "Dangerous Place" (Synth Pop Version). Only one copy of this tape has seen circulation; it is unknown whether Julie used the tape to shop for a record label, or sold them at concerts.

Julie's musical career initially took off after singer Sam Phillips forwarded her demo tape to friends at Myrrh Records. Myrrh signed Miller to a contract and released Meet Julie Miller (her first solo album) in 1990. This album included backing vocals from Shawn Colvin, Victoria Williams, Amy Grant, Kelly Willard and Russ Taff.

Miller's second solo album He Walks Through Walls (1991) also included backing vocals from Colvin, Williams, Grant and Willard. Mark Heard and Reverend Dan Smith also contributed vocals. This album included the original version of the song "Broken Things", which was later re-recorded. Her 1993 album Orphans and Angels included a duet with Emmylou Harris on "All My Tears", which was written after the death of Mark Heard. Jazz vocalist Jimmy Scott also contributed vocals. Miller also covered Heard's song "Treasure of the Broken Land". Shawn Colvin once again contributed background vocals. The video of the song "S.O.S." from this album was released to Christian TV.

Her fourth solo album Invisible Girl was released by Street Level Records. Julie covered The Williams Brothers song "Can't Cry Hard Enough". Victoria Williams, Mark Olson and the Electrics provided background vocals. In 1997, Julie Miller released Blue Pony (Hightone Records) which includes contributions from Emmylou Harris, Buddy Miller, and Valerie Carter. Her most recent solo album is Broken Things in 1999, which includes new versions of "Broken Things" and "All My Tears" as well as new songs "I Know Why The River Runs," "Orphan Train," "Out in the Rain" and "I Still Cry." The song "By way of Sorrow" was a duet with Innocence Mission's Karen Peris.

In 2001, the first Buddy and Julie Miller duo album Buddy & Julie Miller was released in 2001. This album won the Americana Music Association award for best album in 2002. Released in 2002, Love Snuck Up was a compilation of the Millers' Hightone recordings. A Julie Miller compilation is planned, which will include tracks selected by Julie from her first four albums, which have been out of print for many years.

=== Work with other artists ===
In 1987 Julie contributed background vocals to the song "Remember Me" on Benny Hester's album Through the Window. In 1992, Julie provided the title track for Cry of the Heart: Emily's Eyes, an album released to bring hope to victims of child abuse. Julie mentioned after a 2002 concert in Kentucky that the song "Emily's Eyes" had one line edited out of it, as there was concern regarding the "implications". No further details were provided.

In 1994, Julie and Buddy Miller recorded Mark Heard's "Orphans of God" which was the title track for the single CD Mark Heard Tribute album Strong Hand of Love. They also assisted Victoria Williams on her version of "What Kind of Friend". Later that same year, both songs were included on the two-CD Mark Heard Tribute Orphans of God, with the song "What kind of Friend" expanded by nearly a full minute.

In 2022 Miller contributed a rendition of "That's Why We Don't Love God" to the Randy Stonehill tribute album, "There's a Rainbow Somewhere."

Julie's composition, "By Way of Sorrow," was an inspiration for the tone of Cameron Crowe's movie Vanilla Sky but the song was not featured in the film.

=== Covers of Julie Miller songs ===
Many artists have recorded songs composed by Julie Miller, and Julie and Buddy. See the list of songs written by Buddy and Julie Miller for an extensive list. After the 1998 Omagh bombing in Northern Ireland, local singer Juliet Turner performed a version of Miller's song "Broken Things" at a memorial service for the victims of the bombing.

=== Touring and performing ===
Julie and Buddy Miller teamed up with Victoria Williams, Mark Olson, and Jim Lauderdale for a European tour billed as "The Rolling Creek Dippers" in the 90s.

== Personal life ==
Julie has been married to Buddy Miller since 1981. They met in 1976 in Austin when Buddy auditioned for and played in a band with her.

They live in Nashville, where Buddy has set up a home studio on the main floor for music recording and production. She has battled the effects of fibromyalgia, mood swings, and depression.

== Discography ==
=== Solo and with Buddy Miller ===
Year	Album	Chart Positions				Label
Year	Album	US Christian	US Country	US	US Heat	Label
1990	Meet Julie Miller	23				Myrrh
1991	He Walks Through Walls	27				Myrrh
1993	Orphans and Angels	29				Myrrh
1994	Invisible Girl					Street Level
1997	Blue Pony					HighTone
1999	Broken Things					HighTone
2001	Buddy & Julie Miller (with Buddy Miller)		45		41	HighTone
2004	Love Snuck Up (with Buddy Miller)					HighTone
2009	Written in Chalk (with Buddy Miller)			159	3	New West
2019	Breakdown on 20th Ave. South (with Buddy Miller)					New West
2023	In the Throes (with Buddy Miller)					New West

=== Music videos ===
Year	Video
1990	"How Could You Say No"

=== As contributing musician ===
- 1984: Dennis Agajanian - Where Are The Heroes (Sparrow)
- 1990: Victoria Williams - Swing The Statue! (Rough Trade)
- 1993: Wes King - The Robe (RCA)
- 1995: Nina Åström - Moods (Spark)
- 1995: Kate Miner - Sacred (Cadillac Fund Productions)
- 1998: Candle - Bullfrogs and Butterflies II: God Loves Fun (Birdwing)
- 1998: Lee Ann Womack - Some Things I Know (Decca)
- 1998: Patty Griffin - Flaming Red (A&M)
- 1998: Victoria Williams - Musings of a Creek Dipper (Atlantic)
- 2000: Bill Mallonee and Vigilantes of Love – Audible Sigh (Compass Records)
- 2000: Emmylou Harris - Red Dirt Girl (Nonesuch)
- 2000: Lee Ann Womack - I Hope You Dance (MCA Nashville)
- 2000: Tim Finn - Say It Is So (Hypertension)
- 2001: John Hiatt - The Tiki Bar Is Open (Vanguard)
- 2002: The Chieftains - Down the Old Plank Road: The Nashville Sessions (RCA)
- 2002: Jim Lauderdale - The Hummingbirds (Dualtone)
- 2003: Emmylou Harris - Stumble into Grace (Nonesuch)
- 2003: Patty Griffin - A Kiss in Time (ATO)
- 2005: Patty Griffin - Impossible Dream (Proper)
- 2005: Jude Johnstone - On A Good Day (Bojak)
- 2007: Levon Helm - Dirt Farmer (Vanguard)
- 2010: Patty Griffin - Downtown Church (Credential)
- 2013: Shawn Colvin - All Fall Down (Nonesuch Records)
- 2014: Johnny Two Bags (Jonny Wickersham) - Salvation Town (Isotone Records)

=== As primary contributing artist ===
- 1995: Various Artists - Noel (VIA Records) - track 10, "Away in a Manger" (with Buddy Miller)

Awards
First None recognized before	AMA Album of the Year (artist); 2002 with Buddy Miller	Succeeded by Johnny Cash
Preceded by Alison Krauss and Robert Plant	AMA Album of the Year (artist); 2009 with Buddy Miller	Succeeded by Rosanne Cash
Preceded by Hayes Carll and Brian Keane	AMA Song of the Year (Songwriter); 2009	Succeeded by Ryan Bingham and T Bone Burnett
Preceded by Alison Krauss and Robert Plant	AMA Duo/Group of the Year; 2009 with Buddy Miller	Succeeded by The Avett Brothers
