= Candle (band) =

American musical group

Candle is a Christian kids' band that is best known for their Agapeland-related children's albums Music Machine and Bullfrogs and Butterflies. They recorded children's albums for Sparrow Records' Birdwing branch.

The band won the 1988 Dove Award "Children's Music Album of the Year" for their album Bullfrogs and Butterflies III. They have also been nominated for a Grammy Award multiple times.

== List of Candle albums ==
- Agapeland
- Agapeland Character Builder Series
- Animals and Other Things - nominated for the 1982 Grammy Award "Best Recording for Children"
- The Story of Little Tree
- The Birthday Party
- The Bible: The Amazing Book
- Ants'hillvania
- Ants'hillvania II: The Honeydew Adventure
- Bullfrogs and Butterflies
- Bullfrogs and Butterflies II - nominated for the 1985 Grammy Award "Best Recording for Children"
- Bullfrogs and Butterflies III - winner of the 1988 Dove Award "Children's Music Album of the Year", nominated for the 1987 Grammy Award "Best Recording for Children"
- Bullfrogs and Butterflies IV: I've Been Born Again - nominated for the 1989 Grammy Award "Best Recording for Children"
- Music Machine
- Music Machine II - Dove Winner, nominated for 1983 Grammy Award "Best Recording for Children"
- Music Machine III
- Music Machine Fun Club Album
- Sir Oliver's Song
- Nathaniel the Grublet
