= Buddy Miller =

American singer-songwriter (born 1952)

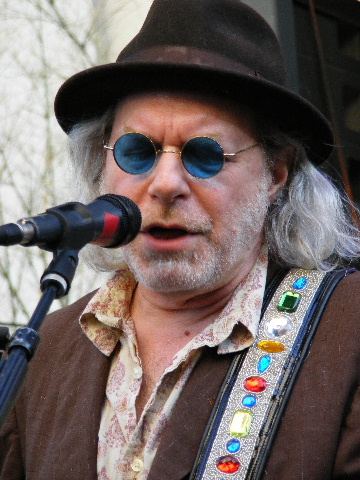
- Miller in 2010

Background information
- Born: Steven Paul Miller; September 6, 1952 (age 74); Fairborn, Ohio, U.S.
- Genres: Country, Americana
- Occupations: Musician, singer-songwriter, producer
- Instruments: Vocals, guitar
- Years active: 1983–present
- Labels: HighTone, New West
- Website: buddyandjulie.com

Steven Paul "Buddy" Miller (born September 6, 1952) is an American singer, songwriter, musician, recording artist and producer. Miller is married to and has recorded with singer-songwriter Julie Miller.

== Early life and music career ==
Buddy was born in Fairborn, Ohio, near Dayton, and his family eventually settled in Princeton, New Jersey. His grandfather gave him the nickname "Buddy".

During the late 1970s Miller was in a country-rock band called the Desperate Men, which played in venues in the North Jersey and New York area, including clubs like Stanhope House and Cuss From Hoe. In 1975, he moved to Austin, Texas, and played rockabilly music in Ray Campi's band. He auditioned for and played in the band Partners In Crime with Julie Griffin (soon to be his second wife).

In 1980, they moved to New York City, and Miller formed the Buddy Miller Band, which included singer-songwriter Shawn Colvin on vocals and guitar. He also performed with Jim Lauderdale and Larry Campbell. Each Sunday, Miller performed in Kinky Friedman's band at the Lone Star Cafe.

Miller moved to Nashville in the 1990s, after a stint in Los Angeles. He worked on recording sessions as a guitar player and vocalist, and began producing his own records in his living room studio named Dogtown.

== Recordings ==
In 1995, Buddy along with the Sacred Cows recorded a gospel album, Man on the Moon.

His first solo recording, Your Love and Other Lies, was released in 1995. It was followed by Poison Love in 1997 and Cruel Moon in 1999.

He and his wife, Julie Miller, released Buddy & Julie Miller in 2001, which won the Album of the Year Award from the Americana Music Association.

In 2002, he released Midnight and Lonesome and in 2004 he released Universal United House of Prayer.

2009 brought another Buddy and Julie duet album Written in Chalk and in 2011 Buddy collaborated with Bill Frisell, Marc Ribot, and Greg Leisz to release The Majestic Silver Strings.

In 2012, Buddy and Jim Lauderdale released the duet album Buddy & Jim and in 2016, Buddy recorded sessions by Kacey Musgraves, Nikki Lane, Lee Ann Womack, Brandi Carlile, and Kris Kristofferson on the album Cayamo: Sessions at Sea.

== Touring and performance ==
Miller has toured as lead guitarist and backing vocalist for Emmylou Harris's Spyboy band, for Steve Earle on his El Corazon tour, and for Emmylou Harris and Linda Ronstadt on their Western Wall tour.

In 2002, Miller toured as part of the Down from the Mountain Tour along with Alison Krauss and Union Station.

In 2004, Miller toured with Emmylou Harris, Patty Griffin, Gillian Welch and David Rawlings as the Sweet Harmony Traveling Revue.

In 2008, Miller toured as part of the band on Robert Plant and Alison Krauss's Raising Sand tour of the U.S. and Europe.

In 2009, Miller joined Emmylou Harris, Patty Griffin and Shawn Colvin on tour as Three Girls and Their Buddy. While on that tour, following a performance in Baltimore on February 19, 2009, Miller suffered a heart attack. He underwent successful triple bypass surgery at Johns Hopkins Hospital on February 20.

In 2010, Miller again joined Robert Plant and Patty Griffin with Plant's Band of Joy, touring the U.S. and Europe.

In 2012, Miller toured with Jim Lauderdale on the Buddy and Jim Tour.

In 2015, Miller was one of the leaders of the house band for Dear Jerry, a tribute concert for Jerry Garcia, which included over 20 acts and took place at Merriweather Post Pavilion.

In 2016, Miller was part of the Lampedusa: Concerts for Refugees tour featuring Patty Griffin, Emmylou Harris, Steve Earle, and the Milk Carton Kids.

For the past decade, Buddy has often been a part of the Cayamo Cruise, which sails from Miami to St. Maarten and Tortola. Each year, prominent Americana musicians are on board, and Buddy often collaborates and records with them.

He is a regular performer at the annual Hardly Strictly Bluegrass music festival in San Francisco, where he features a changing roster of guest performers, billed as Buddy Miller's Cavalcade of Stars.

== Recording work for others ==
=== Record producer ===
Miller has produced albums for artists including Richard Thompson, Shawn Colvin, The Devil Makes Three, Allison Moorer, the Wood Brothers, the Carolina Chocolate Drops, the McCrarys, and Ralph Stanley. He has co-produced records with Robert Plant, Jim Lauderdale and Jimmie Dale Gilmore.

In 2006 Solomon Burke recorded his country album Nashville with Miller; Emmylou Harris, Patty Griffin, Gillian Welch and Dolly Parton appear as duet partners.

Miller produced Patty Griffin's Downtown Church, which was released in 2010 and won a Grammy Award for Best Traditional Gospel Album on February 13, 2011.

Miller has produced his own solo albums as well as recordings for and with his wife, singer-songwriter Julie Miller.

=== Session work ===
Miller co-produced and performed on Jimmie Dale Gilmore's 2000 album One Endless Night. He also played on Lucinda Williams's Car Wheels on a Gravel Road album.

Miller has worked as an instrumentalist or vocalist on records by Miranda Lambert, Johnny Cash, Levon Helm, Lee Ann Womack, Patty Griffin, Emmylou Harris, Victoria Williams, Shawn Colvin, Bobby Bare, Chris Knight, John Fogerty, the Chieftains, Frank Black, Rodney Crowell, Dixie Chicks, Elvis Costello, Alison Krauss and Robert Plant. He has also worked as a recording engineer, mixer or mastering engineer on records by Willie Nelson, Emmylou Harris, Shawn Colvin, Jim Lauderdale, and Patty Griffin.

=== Songwriting ===
Levon Helm, Patty Griffin, Emmylou Harris, Lee Ann Womack, Dixie Chicks, Hank Williams III, Dierks Bentley, Patty Loveless, Tab Benoit and Brooks & Dunn have recorded songs written by Miller.

=== Film and TV ===
Miller signed on as a producer for the ABC TV series Nashville in 2012; he was the executive music producer for the show in seasons two and three. He also was music producer and musical director for Nashville: On The Record Live Specials.

Along with Don Was, Miller was the musical director for The Life and Songs of Emmylou Harris tribute concert.

Miller was musical director and bandleader for the Americana Music Association's Honors & Awards shows broadcast on AXS TV and PBS.

Buddy has covered Tom T. Hall's song "That's How I Got to Memphis", which Jeff Daniels sang in the final episode of HBO's The Newsroom in 2014.

The Starz political drama Boss used the Plant–Miller-produced "Satan, Your Kingdom Must Come Down" as its theme song.

Miller produced the track "Beyond the Blue" featuring Emmylou Harris and Patty Griffin for the 2000 film Where the Heart Is.

In 2015 he appeared on Christina Aguilera's song "Shotgun", written for her appearance on Nashville.

In 2017, Miller contributed his cover of Mark Heard's song "Treasure of the Broken Land" to the tribute album Treasure of the Broken Land: the Songs of Mark Heard.

== Awards, accolades, and other activities ==
Between 2002 and 2013, Miller won twelve Americana Music Honors & Awards and was nominated for seven others. Since 2005, he has led the Americana All Star Band, which performs with nominated artists during the Americana Music Honors & Awards ceremonies, held annually at the Ryman Auditorium.

No Depression magazine named him Artist of the Decade in 2008.

=== Americana Music Awards ===
Year	Category	Work	Result
2002	Artist of the Year	Buddy and Julie Miller	Nominated
2002	Album of the Year	Buddy & Julie Miller	Won
2003	Instrumentalist of the Year	Buddy Miller	Nominated
2003	Album of the Year	Midnight & Lonesome	Nominated
2005	Artist of the Year	Buddy Miller	Nominated
2005	Song of the Year	Worry Too Much	Won
2005	Album of the Year	Universal United House of Prayer	Won
2007	Instrumentalist of the Year	Buddy Miller	Won
2008	Instrumentalist of the Year	Buddy Miller	Won
2009	Instrumentalist of the Year	Buddy Miller	Nominated
2009	Album of the Year	"Written In Chalk"	Won
2009	Song of the Year	"Chalk"	Won
2009	Duo/Group of the Year	Buddy and Julie Miller	Won
2009	Artist of the Year	Buddy Miller	Won
2010	Instrumentalist of the Year	Buddy Miller	Won
2011	Instrumentalist of the Year	Buddy Miller	Won
2011	Artist of the Year	Buddy Miller	Won
2012	Instrumentalist of the Year	Buddy Miller	Won
2013	Duo/Group of the Year	Buddy Miller and Jim Lauderdale	Nominated
2013	Artist of the Year	Buddy Miller	Nominated
2013	Album of the Year	Buddy & Jim	Nominated
2022	Lifetime Achievement Award	Buddy Miller	Won

=== Grammy Awards ===
Miller is a four-time Grammy nominee, winning once in 2010 for producing Downtown Church by Patty Griffin.

Year	Category	Work	Result
2001	Best Contemporary Folk Album	Buddy & Julie Miller	Nominated
2004	Best Southern, Country or Bluegrass Gospel Album	Universal United House of Prayer	Nominated
2010	Best Traditional Gospel Album	Downtown Church	Won
2013	Best Americana Album	Buddy & Jim	Nominated

== Radio ==
Miller and his longtime friend and collaborator Jim Lauderdale teamed up in 2012 to produce The Buddy & Jim Radio Show, broadcast on Sirius XM Outlaw Country.

== Music gear ==
Fender produces a Buddy Miller signature acoustic guitar.

Buddy frequently uses vintage Wandré electric guitars and TEO mando-guitars.

In his studio, Buddy uses a pair of Swart amplifiers: Atomic Space Tones and Atomic Space Tone Pros, and two tremolos panned in stereo at conflicting settings. Onstage, he often uses a Swart Atomic Space Tones amplifier and a Fulltone Supa-Trem2 pedal.

He mostly records using Pro Tools, but in his recording studio Buddy treasures a 1970s Trident B Range 28×24 analog recording console that previously belonged to Mark Heard.
