= Josh Joplin =

American musician (born 1972)

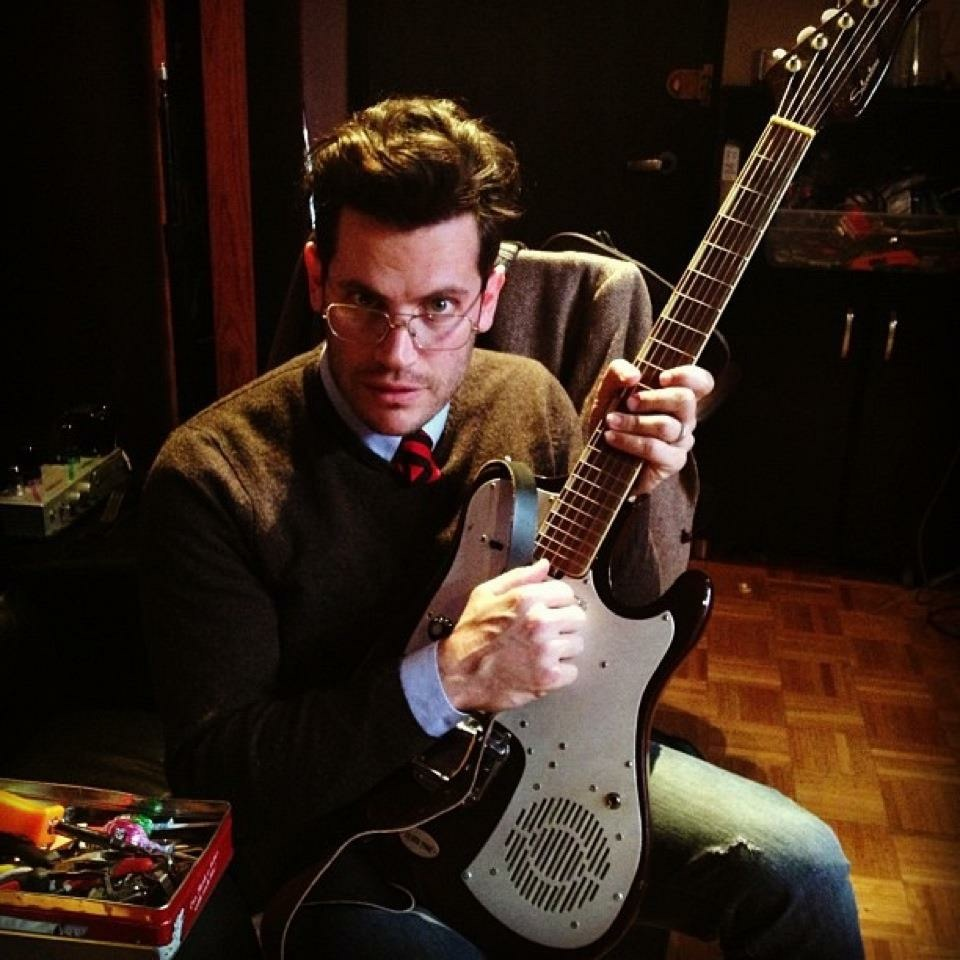
- Joplin in 2015

Background information
- Born: Joshua David Blum; January 1, 1972 (age 54); Washington DC, US
- Genres: Rock; folk
- Occupations: Musician; record producer; film producer
- Labels: Sleepless Nights Records; Artemis Records; Sony Records; Epic Records; Verve Records; 9th Grade Records
- Member of: Among the Oak & Ash
- Formerly of: Josh Joplin Group

Josh Joplin (born Joshua David Blum on January 1, 1972) is an American singer, songwriter, as well as music and film producer. He has founded the bands Josh Joplin Group and Among the Oak & Ash. His song "Camera One" was the first independent release to hit #1 at Triple A radio. His song "Blue Skies Again" was recorded by Jessica Lea Mayfield for her Nonesuch debut Tell Me. Pitchfork praised it as, "simple, the infectious chorus makes it a standout...it's also a sunny, reassuring song." Joplin has toured extensively in North America, Europe, and Australia, and has recorded several albums with different bands.

== Life and career ==
Born in Washington, DC, Joplin grew up in Lancaster County, Pennsylvania. His family relocated to Columbia, Maryland, in 1985, when he was 13. There, Joplin attended Sandy Spring Friends School and learned to play guitar. He quit the school's Community House program in the ninth grade and finished the year at Hammond High School. He briefly returned before dropping out of high school altogether. At the age of sixteen, Joplin successfully passed the GED and earned his Maryland high school diploma.

His first professional job in music was as the runner for folk/blues legend Dave Van Ronk's concert at Swallow Hill Music Association. They hired him later the same year to open for Bill Staines.

Joplin's interest in folk music began in earnest after hearing Bob Dylan's The Times They Are a-Changin', and Phil Ochs' Gunfight at Carnegie Hall. He recorded an Ochs cover, "I Ain't a Marchin' Anymore", on his first record, Facts of Fortune for Sleepless Nights Records, a DC record label, founded by Mr. Issa (Diao) of Good Clean Fun. Joplin released his first single, "A Present for Hitler", in 1989, which featured three original folk songs.

=== Atlanta ===
Having stayed a short time in New York City, Joplin heard Kevn Kinney on WFUV radio and bought his first record, MacDougal Blues. This convinced him to relocate to Atlanta. He played mostly solo shows for tips at Sylvia's Atomic Cafe, a Candler Park neighborhood landmark. It was here that Josh met fellow songwriter Kelly Hogan, who worked there as a cook and played in The Jody Grind. He also met Shawn Mullins at the cafe. Upon seeing Five-Eight opening for The Jody Grind, Joplin began to look for a band of his own.

He recorded his third and last album for Sleepless Nights, I Love Janey, But Janey Loves The Grateful Dead. It was produced by Ed Burdell (Magnapop). Members of the Mirthmakers and Joybang backed Joplin on the recording. For a while, he played music with Ani Cordero on drums and a friend on bass, but he finally emerged with his own lineup. In 1995, Geoff Melkonian (bass, viola) and Jason Buecker (drums) founded the Josh Joplin Band. They released the albums Projector Head and Boxing Nostalgic as a trio, later adding Allen Broyles on piano and organ. Shawn Mullins signed the quartet to his own SMG Label. He produced the original version of Useful Music, Joplin's sixth studio album. Shortly after its 1999 release, Jason Buecker was replaced on drums by Ani Cordero, then Eric Taylor. Deeds Davis was added on lead guitar, and the band made a slight name change, to Josh Joplin Group.

Artemis Records re-released Useful Music in 2001 and scored the band's first and only number one hit at Triple A radio with "Camera One", which was produced by Jerry Harrison of the Modern Lovers and Talking Heads. The band made their television debut that year, appearing on the Late Show with David Letterman, followed by Late Night with Conan O'Brien. "Camera One" was also featured in the TV shows Scrubs, Dawson's Creek, Party of Five, Roswell, among others.

=== New York City ===
Joplin moved to the Brooklyn borough of New York City in 1998. He continued to tour and play with Josh Joplin Group as well as doing solo shows. The band followed the success of Useful Music with the album The Future That Was, produced by Rob Gal (the Rock-A-Teens). It was recorded at Adam Schlesinger and James Iha's studio, Stratosphere Sound. Though it received much more critical acclaim, it had very little commercial success. Josh Joplin Group disbanded in December 2003.

In 2004, Joplin was still living in Cobble Hill, Brooklyn, across the street from his then-neighbor, Dan Zanes (the Del Fuegos). Zanes hosted impromptu stoop concerts for the children (and adults) on the block. Joplin stated being deeply inspired by these intimate events. When he recorded the album Jaywalker, he sought ways to mimic the joy he witnessed with Zanes by recording the album with the friends and people he'd grown up with, including the headmaster who had taught him guitar. Jaywalker was released on August 23, 2005, on Eleven Thirty Records.

In 2013, Joplin independently released the five-song EP Earth and Other Things on 9th Grade Records. It remains his last musical effort under the name Josh Joplin. It was recorded at Mercy Sound Studio on the Lower East Side of New York City by producer/engineer/guitarist Matt Chiaravalle. Matt and Josh had also worked together on Useful Music.

On April 23, 2022, the Josh Joplin Group performed a twentieth-anniversary reunion show in Atlanta, Georgia.

=== Among the Oak & Ash ===
In 2008, Joplin formed a new band called Among the Oak & Ash with Garrison Starr, Bryan Owings, and Brian Harrison. They released their self-titled debut album in 2009 on Verve Records. It was named Album of the Year by WNYC's John Schaeffer on his program Soundcheck. They followed it with Devil Ship in 2011. This album featured performances by Lucy Wainwright Roche, Jessica Lea Mayfield, Paleface, and Rachael Hester. In 2014, they recorded a third album, A Skeptics Gospel, which was never released. Harrison, who had co-produced all three records, died at his Nashville studio on February 18, 2014.

In 2023, the band started releasing singles on streaming services and playing shows under the moniker Josh Joplin and Among the Oak & Ash. They released a new album, titled Figure Drawing, on October 24, 2023. Contributing musicians included guitarist and fiddler Fats Kaplin.

=== NarrowMoat ===
In 2015, Joplin founded the production company NarrowMoat. He has produced two independent films, About Colonia and The Murphys. About Colonia, directed by Eduardo Shlomo Velázquez, was screened and lauded with awards in the short film and Spanish-language categories at several international film festivals.

NarrowMoat's most recent film, Boys Clap, Girls Dance, directed and animated by Dena Springer, was released June 28, 2022. It garnered nominations at several film festivals, including the Chicago Underground Film Festival. It won Best Animated Film at BIFF Sweden and was screened at the Cork International Film Festival and the Atlanta Film Festival.

== Discography ==
Studio Albums
Album	Year	Label	Released as
Facts of Fortune	1990	Sleepless Nights	Josh Joplin
Projector Head	1995	Jolly Joe Music	Josh Joplin Band
Boxing Nostalgic	1997	Jolly Joe Music	Josh Joplin Band
Useful Music	1998	SMG Entertainment	Josh Joplin Group
Useful Music (reissue)	2001	Artemis Records	Josh Joplin Group
The Future That Was	2002	Artemis Records	Josh Joplin Group
Jaywalker	2005	Eleven Thirty Records	Josh Joplin
Among the Oak & Ash	2009	Verve Forecast Records	Among the Oak & Ash
Devil Ship	2011	NarrowMoat	Among the Oak & Ash
Earth and Other Things	2013	9th Grade Records	Josh Joplin
Figure Drawing	2023	NarrowMoat	Josh Joplin Group
GpYr	2025	NarrowMoat	Josh Joplin Group
Useful Music (25th Anniversary)	2026	NarrowMoat	Josh Joplin Group

Singles
Album	Year	Label	Format
"A Present for Hitler"	1989	Sleepless Nights	7"
"I Love Janey, but Janey Loves the Grateful Dead"	1992	Sleepless Nights	7"

Compilations
Album	Year	Label
The Early Years: Volume One	2004	Lifting Lomax Songs
The Best of the Josh Joplin Group	2005	Artemis Records
misc..misc	2024	Narrow Moat
