= Josh Joplin Group =

American alternative rock band

- Origin: Atlanta, Georgia, United States
- Genres: Alternative rock; folk rock; Americana
- Years active: 1995–2003; 2022–present
- Labels: Independent, SMG, Artemis Sony, Epic, Missing Piece Records
- Members: Josh Joplin; Geoff Melkonian; Jason Buecker; Allen Broyles; Ani Cordero; Eric Taylor; Wes Langlois
- Website: https://joshjoplingroup.com/

The Josh Joplin Group is an alternative rock band led by singer-songwriter Josh Joplin which formed in Atlanta, Georgia. Initially a trio, Joplin hired Geoff Melkonian (bass/viola/vocals) and Jason Buecker (drums/percussion/vocals) to accompany him to play shows together. They initially called themselves the Josh Joplin Band. In late 1995 they began pre-production on their first album together. Recorded at Furies Studios with producer Ed Burdell (Magnapop), Projector Head was released on January 6, 1996. Based on local critical success and some airplay on local radio, Joplin, Buecker, and Melkonian began touring vigorously, starting in the south, continuing through the northeast, and beyond.

Boxing Nostalgic was their self-produced sophomore effort. It was released April 6, 1997 to a sold-out show at the Cotton Club. The album introduced piano to their sound, and Allen Broyles, who played on the record, would join the band that same year. The band continued touring and opening shows for Jump, Little Children, Five-eight, The Innocence Mission, Ben Harper, Nathan Sheppard, Kitty Snyder, among others.

In 1998, having played the Roxy Theatre (Atlanta) opening for Shawn Mullins, the Grammy-nominated songwriter of "Lullaby", the band discussed making their third album with their friend and Mullins signed on as the producer, hiring Anthony J. Resta to create the beats and programming for it. Mullins would later release the album, Useful Music, on his own SMG label. Shortly after its release, Jason Buecker was replaced on drums by Ani Cordero, then by Eric Taylor, who had drummed for the dream pop band Seely. Deeds Davis was added to play lead guitar and sing.

The band was managed briefly by Nettwerk Music Group before making a slight name change to the Josh Joplin Group when Artemis Records, headed by Danny Goldberg and Daniel Glass, signed them. They were picked up by Russell Carter, known for managing Indigo Girls and Matthew Sweet.

The Artemis re-release features an alternative version of Joplin's ballad "I've Changed". It was produced by Peter Collins at the Ocean Way Nashville recording studio, with Kenny Aronoff playing drums. A slightly more successful collaboration came when Jerry Harrison (formerly of the Modern Lovers and Talking Heads) was brought on to produce the opening track "Matter" and the new song "Camera One".

The album came out on January 30, 2001 to strong reviews and sold over 100,000 records in its first week. Its single, "Camera One," was the first independent release to go number-one at Triple A radio and went to number 22 on the Billboard Top 40 chart in 2001. It won the "Single Of The Year" award by the American Association of Independent Music. Useful Music songs were featured in many of the top rated shows of the time, including Party of Five, Dawson's Creek, and Camera One was a feature of an episode of the comedy series Scrubs.

The Josh Joplin Group toured the US, Mexico, Canada, Australia, and all of Europe. They played shows with countless bands, and artists including Travis, Old 97's, Matthew Sweet, Uncle Green, Yeah Yeah Yeahs, Lifehouse, Pink, and Smoke, and had finished performing a German festival in Cologne, when Green Day burned their drums on stage. The band has also appeared on Late Night with Conan O'Brien, Late Show with David Letterman, The Late Late Show with Craig Ferguson, The Panel (Australian TV series), The Mike Bullard Show, Viva TV (Germany), MTV, VH1.

In June 2002, Josh Joplin began working on demos for songwriter turned producer, Fountains of Wayne's Adam Schlesinger. Schlesinger was tapped to produce the group's sophomore Artemis release. He recorded 12 songs acoustically at Stratosphere Sound, (owned by Schlesinger and James Iha). And although the timing didn't work out for the two to work together, Josh and the group, sans Davis, did end up recording The Future That Was. with Atlanta producer, Rob Gal and engineers, John Holbrook and Rudyard Lee Cullers at Stratosphere. On this record, the musical styles were similarly varied, ranging from slow piano- and acoustic guitar-driven pop to upbeat keyboard- and electric guitar-based rock.

The Future That Was received critical acclaim but it sold poorly and Artemis released the band from their contract. Artemis released two singles from the album, "I Am Not the Only Cowboy" and "Wonder Wheel," but neither one took off. In the fall of 2003, the band announced that it was breaking up and would play its final two shows in Atlanta in December of that year.

Joplin re-formed the band in 2022, inaugurating their reunion with a concert in Atlanta. The following year, Joplin's folk album Figure Drawing was released by his NarrowMoat label as a Josh Joplin Group record. Joplin credited the album to the band as "a way to acknowledge all of the amazing musicians that have collaborated with him through the years". GpYr, the first album recorded with the reunited group, was released in 2025 by Missing Piece Records.

== Discography ==
=== Josh Joplin Band ===
- Projector Head
  - Release Date: January 6, 1996
  - Label: Self-released
- Boxing Nostalgic
  - Release Date: April 6, 1997
  - Label: Self-released
- Useful Music
  - Release Date: May 25, 1999
  - Label: SMG Records

=== Josh Joplin Group ===
- Useful Music
  - Release Date: January 23, 2001
  - Label: Artemis Records, Sony Music (Europe), Epic Records (Australia, South Africa)
- The Future That Was
  - Release Date: September 24, 2002
  - Label: Artemis Records
- Figure Drawing
  - Release Date: March 15, 2023
  - Label: NarrowMoat
- GpYr
  - Release Date: April 4, 2025
  - Label: Missing Piece Records
  - Featuring: "Goodbye Berlin," "One More Someone," "I'm With Gorillas"
