= Useful Music =

Studio album by Josh Joplin Band
- Released: May 25, 1999
- Recorded: Orphan Studios and Southern Living At Its Finest, Atlanta, GA; NG Studios, New York City, NY; New Reflections, Nashville, TN; Chicky World, Austin, TX
- Genres: Folk rock, Americana
- Labels: SMG, Artemis
- Producer: Shawn Mullins

Josh Joplin Band chronology
Boxing Nostalgic (1997)	Useful Music (1999)

Josh Joplin Group chronology
Useful Music (2001)	The Future That Was (2002)

Singles from Useful Music
- 1. "Camera One" Released: February 6, 2001; 2. "Gravity" Released: June 19, 2001; 3. "I've Changed" Released: December 11, 2001

Useful Music is a studio album initially released in May 1999 under the SMG Records label by Josh Joplin Band, and again in January 2001 through Artemis Records after the band had renamed itself Josh Joplin Group following a change in its line-up. While the album did not enjoy widespread commercial success, it peaked at #22 on the Billboard Independent Albums chart and spawned a moderate hit with its first single, "Camera One", which quickly reached #1 on the Triple A airplay chart, the highest position ever achieved by an independent release at that point (February 2001). Featuring a more rock-edged, radio-friendly sound than most of the other material on Useful Music, the song was also featured in an episode of the comedy series Scrubs (season 1, episode 7, "My Super Ego").

== Track listing ==
=== Original release (1999) ===
All songs written by Josh Joplin.

Track	Title	Producer	Engineer	Mixer	Mastering	Length
1	"Matter"	Jerry Harrison	Karl Derfler	Tom Lord-Alge	Ted Jensen	4:13
2	"Gravity"	Shawn Mullins	Russ Fowler, Alex Lowe	Phil Nicolo	Greg Calbi	3:04
3	"Here I Am"	Rob Gal, Mullins	Fowler	Matt Chiaravalle	Calbi	4:18
4	"Far Away"	Mullins	Fowler	Fowler	Calbi	2:54
5	"Undone"	Mullins	Fowler	Nicolo	Calbi	4:09
6	"I've Changed"	Mullins	Fowler	Nicolo	Calbi	4:13
7	"Trailways"	Mullins	Fowler	Chiaravalle	Calbi	3:59
8	"Who's Afraid of Thomas Wolfe?"	Mullins	Fowler	Fowler	Calbi	4:01
9	"Phil Ochs"	Allan Broyles, Josh Joplin	Charles “Chicky” Reeves	Fowler	Calbi	3:12
10	"Superstar"	Mullins	Fowler	Chiaravalle	Calbi	3:33
11	"Human"	Mullins	Fowler	Fowler	Calbi	4:25
12	"Dutch Wonderland"	Mullins	Fowler	Fowler	Calbi	3:54

=== Re-release (2001) ===
All credits are the same as the original release except where noted.

1. "Matter"
2. "Gravity"
3. "Here I Am"
4. "Undone"
5. "Camera One" – 4:33
  - Producer: Jerry Harrison
  - Engineer: Karl Derfler
  - Mixer: Tom Lord-Alge
  - Mastering: Ted Jensen
6. "I've Changed"
7. "Trailways"
8. "Who's Afraid of Thomas Wolfe?"
9. "Phil Ochs"
10. "Superstar"
11. "Human"
12. "Dutch Wonderland"
13. "I've Changed (alternate version)" – 4:21
  - Producer: Peter Collins
  - Engineer: F. Reid Shippen
  - Mastering: Greg Calbi

== Album credits ==
=== Personnel ===
- Kenny Aronoff – drums
- Allen Broyles – backing vocals, piano, trumpet, organ, accordion, harmonium, keyboards, Wurlitzer electric piano
- Jason Buecker – percussion, drums, backing vocals
- Ani Cordero – backing vocals
- Deb Davis – electric guitar ("Trailways")
- Joe Gore – electric guitar
- Carl Herrgesell – electric guitar
- Danny Howes – electric guitar
- Clay Johnson – backing vocals
- Josh Joplin – lead and backing vocals, Rhodes electric piano, harmonica, acoustic guitar
- David Kostiner – drums
- Diana Mangano – backing vocals
- Geoff Melkonian – backing vocals, electric bass, double bass, viola
- Shawn Mullins – guitar, piano, backing vocals
- Pamela Sixfin – violin
- Eric Taylor – drums ("Camera One")
- Kris Wilkinson – string arrangement

=== Production ===
- John Bentham – photography
- Chris Bilheimer – art direction
- Allen Broyles – producer ("Phil Ochs")
- Greg Calbi – mastering (all tracks except "Matter" and "Camera One")
- Matt Chiaravalle – mixer ("Here I Am", "Trailways", and "Superstar")
- Peter Collins – producer ("I've Changed (alternate version)")
- Karl Derfler – engineer ("Matter" and "Camera One")
- Russ Fowler – engineer (all tracks except "Matter", "Camera One", and "I've Changed (alternate version)"), mixer ("Far Away", "Phil Ochs", "Who's Afraid of Thomas Wolfe?", "Human", and "Dutch Wonderland")
- Daniel Glass – executive producer
- Jerry Harrison – producer ("Matter" and "Camera One")
- J. Reid Hunter – legal
- Ted Jensen – mastering ("Matter" and "Camera One")
- Josh Joplin – producer ("Phil Ochs")
- Matt Lively – illustration
- Tom Lord-Alge – mixer ("Matter" and "Camera One")
- Alex Lowe – engineer ("Gravity")
- Shawn Mullins – producer (all tracks except "Matter", "Phil Ochs", "Camera One", and "I've Changed (alternate version)")
- Phil Nicolo – mixer ("Gravity," "Undone," and "I've Changed")
- Charles “Chicky” Reeves – engineer ("Phil Ochs")
- Anthony J. Resta – drum and keyboard programmer
- F. Reid Shippen – engineer ("I've Changed (alternate version)")

== Sources ==
- Jenkins, Daniel (December 16, 2000). "Josh Joplin Group Serves Up "Useful Music" on Artemis Set". Billboard. Vol. 112, no. 51. New York: Nielsen Company. p. 20. ISSN 0006-2510.
- Aiese, Eric (June 23, 2001). "Reviews & Previews – Singles (Rock Tracks): 'Gravity'". Billboard. Vol. 113, no. 25. New York: Nielsen Company. p. 24. ISSN 0006-2510. Archived from the original on September 29, 2012.
- Taylor, Chuck (December 15, 2001). "Reviews & Previews – Singles (Pop): 'I've Changed'". Billboard. Vol. 113, no. 50. New York: Nielsen Company. p. 25. ISSN 0006-2510. Archived from the original on September 29, 2012.
- Thelen, Christopher (March 14, 2001). "Album Reviews – Useful Music". The Daily Vault.
- Warburg, Jason (February 15, 2002). "Album Reviews – Useful Music". The Daily Vault.
