= Neilson Hubbard =

American record producer

- Born: Neilson Gray Hubbard; October 27, 1972 (age 53); Jackson, Mississippi, US
- Occupations: Record producer; videographer; singer; songwriter; musician; photographer
- Years active: 1990–present
- Musical career
- Genres: Folk; Americana; indie rock; rock
- Instruments: Vocals; multi-instrumental
- Label: Proper Records
- Website: neilsonhubbard.com

Neilson Gray Hubbard (born October 27, 1972) is an American record producer, film director, film producer, singer-songwriter, and photographer. He produced Mary Gauthier's Grammy-nominated album, Rifles & Rosary Beads, as well as albums for Sam Baker, Kim Richey, and Glen Phillips. He directs and produces music videos and documentaries through his company, Neighborhoods Apart, which produced the Orphan Brigade's (Hubbard's band) documentary and soundtrack, The Orphan Brigade: Soundtrack to a Ghost Story, which won a number of awards. His collaborations with artist Matthew Perryman Jones have been featured in Private Practice, One Tree Hill, Bones, Grey's Anatomy, and several films.

== Early life ==
Hubbard was born on October 27, 1972, in Jackson, Mississippi, to Dale and Suzy Hubbard. He was an All City baseball player and football player throughout high school. He began singing in talent shows at age seven, and learned to play the guitar in high school. He learned to play the keyboard in his early twenties.

== Music career ==
Hubbard's first band was called This Living Hand, formed with producer Clay Jones. They signed to Adam Duritz's label, E Pluribus Unum, and toured nationally with The Counting Crows and The Wallflowers. After the band split up, Hubbard went on to record three solo albums, The Slide Project, Why Men Fail, and Sing into Me. He also collaborated with Matthew Ryan to form the band Strays Don't Sleep.

=== Spoon ===
Childhood friends from Jackson, Mississippi, Hubbard and Clay Jones moved to Oxford to study literature at the University of Mississippi, where they met violinist Helena Lamb. The three began working on songs that Hubbard had written that didn't fit into their previous bands. Hubbard, Jones, and Lamb adopted the name Spoon, and recorded their first song, "Say Something Warm", in one day. They soon began playing live as a trio in bars, coffee houses, college lunch rooms, and restaurants.

During that first year of shows, Spoon recorded the tracks that would make up their second album, Holding Flowers, produced and recorded by Justin Martin. They released the album on their own Lunch Pale label in the fall of 1993. The group added a rhythm section to their lineup, including Garrison Starr playing the snare and ride cymbal, and Jones picked up the bass for the quartet's live shows. Near the end of 1994, Lamb left the group, leaving Hubbard and Jones to continue through 1995 with a two-guitar, drums, and bass lineup.

=== This Living Hand ===
The name "This Living Hand" is derived from the title of a poem by John Keats. The band's songs were written by vocalist and guitarist Hubbard; guitarist Jones was responsible for arrangements and production. In the summer of 1995 the band signed with E Pluribus Unum Recordings in Los Angeles and released their first full-length album, Consolation Prize, in October, with a national tour following. The album was recorded over four days at Easley Studios in Memphis. This Living Hand recorded a second album, The TV Sounds Worried, in 1996 but it was shelved by the record label and remains unreleased to this day.

Hubbard moved to Nashville, opened Mr. Lemons' Studio, and continued producing records for Garrison Starr, Glen Phillips, Strays Don't Sleep, Michelle Malone, Jeremy Lister, Matthew Perryman Jones, and other musicians.

=== Strays Don't Sleep ===
Matthew Ryan approached Hubbard in 2004 about a collaboration. The collaboration was successful, and Strays Don't Sleep was formed with Hubbard, Brian Bequette, Billy Mercer and Steve Latanation.

In the autumn of 2005, Strays Don't Sleep's self-titled debut was released in the UK on One Little Indian. The release includes a DVD of short films that were directed and shot by professional filmmakers and friends, including Gorman Bechard, the Barnes Brothers, Martin Glenn, Matt Boyd, and Jared Johnson. Ryan and Hubbard directed three of the short films, with the help of Nashville film student Matt Riddlehoover. A 5.1 Surround Sound mix of the entire record and films, by Paul PDub Walton of Björk and Sneaker Pimps fame, is available on the DVD.

Strays Don't Sleep was released to positive reviews from Time Out, Uncut, The Sunday Express and The Times. The success helped secure a US release, which was helped further by a placement on the hit CW (former WB) drama One Tree Hill. "For Blue Skies", a song concerning the sentencing of Matthew Ryan's brother to 30 years in prison, was made available on the One Tree Hill soundtrack. Strays Don't Sleep toured the UK with Josh Rouse to support the album. In April 2006, their video album Strays Don't Sleep won the Grand Remi Award at the WorldFest-Houston International Film Festival for Best Music Video, and the band's performance received a standing ovation. In mid-2006, the group was officially disbanded.

In 2008, Hubbard released a new solo record, I Love Your Muscles.

=== The Orphan Brigade ===
The Orphan Brigade was formed in 2014 by founding members Hubbard, Ben Glover, and Joshua Britt. The group spent a year writing and recording their first album, Soundtrack to a Ghost Story, in the allegedly haunted Octagon Hall in Franklin, Kentucky. The group set out to tell the story of this eerie architectural oddity and the family, soldiers, and servants who lived and died there. They looked for inspiration and possible encounters with the spirits of this place. Additional appearances include John Prine, Kim Richey, Gretchen Peters, and Will Kimbrough.

Hubbard's film production company, Neighborhoods Apart, produced and directed the documentary The Orphan Brigade: Soundtrack to a Ghost Story, which was nominated for Best Original Song at the Nashville Film Festival. They have since released two albums, Heart of the Cave (2017) and To the Edge of the World (2019).

== Discography ==
=== The Orphan Brigade ===
- 2019 – To The Edge of the World
- 2017 – Heart of the Cave
- 2015 – Soundtrack to a Ghost Story

=== Buffalo Blood ===
- 2019 – Buffalo Blood

=== Strays Don't Sleep ===
- 2006 – Strays Don't Sleep

=== Solo Projects ===
- 2021 – Digging Up The Scars
- 2018 – Cumberland Island
- 2013 – I'll Be the Tugboat
- 2010 – Do You Want to Start a Fire
- 2008 – I love Your Muscles
- 2003 – Sing into Me
- 2000 – Why Men Fail
- 1997 – The Slide Project

=== This Living Hand ===
- 1995 – Consolation Prize
- 1996 – The TV Sounds Worried

=== Spoon ===
- 1992 – Say Something Warm
- 1993 – Holding Flowers

== Music production ==
- 2019 – The Orphan Brigade – To The Edge of The World
- 2019 – Buffalo Blood – Buffalo Blood
- 2019 – Amy Speace – Me and the Ghost of Charlemagne (Best International Song, American UK)
- 2018 – Ben Glover – Shorebound (UK Americana Album of the Year)
- 2018 – Dean Owens – Southern Wind (UK Title Track winner, Best Song, Americana)
- 2018 – Mary Gauthier – Rifles & Rosary Beads (Grammy-nominated)
- 2017 – The Orphan Brigade – Heart of the Cave
- 2017 – Sam Baker – Land of Doubt
- 2015 – The Orphan Brigade – Soundtrack to a Ghost Story
- 2018 – Dean Owens – Into The Sea
- 2015 – Caroline Spence – Hearts and Spades
- 2015 – Audrey Spillman – Thornbird
- 2014 – The Farewell Drifters – Forever Tomorrow
- 2013 – Kim Richey – Thorn in my Heart
- 2011 – The Farewell Drifters – Echo Boom
- 2011 – The Apache Relay – American Nomad
- 2010 - Gabe Hizer - "Persistence of Memory"
- 2009 – Tyler James – It Took the Fire
- 2006 – Amelia White – Black Doves
- 2006 – Strays Don't Sleep – Strays Don't Sleep
- 2006 – Glen Phillips – Mr. Lemons
- 2006 – Matthew Ryan – From a Late Night High-Rise
- 2006 – Matthew Perryman Jones – Throwing Punches in the Dark
- 2006 – Mack Starks – Blind Spot
- 2005 – Garrison Star – The Sound of You and Me
- 2005 – David Knopfler – America
- 2004 – Kate York – Sadly Love

== Video production ==
- 2020 – Tommy Emamnuel – Fuel
- 2020 – Lilly Hiatt – Candy Launch
- 2019 – Lilly Hiatt – Brightest Star
- 2019 – Amy Speace – Me and the Ghost of Charlemagne
- 2018 – John Prine – Ways of a Woman in Love
- 2018 – John Prine – Daughter and Egg Night
- 2018 – Gretchen Peters – Arguing with Ghosts
- 2018 – Aaron Lee Tasjan – Heart Slows Down
- 2018 – Ben Glover – Kindness
- 2017 – Jason Isbell – If We Were Vampires
- 2017 – Amanda Shires – Harmless
- 2017 – Jason Isbell – Hope the High Road
- 2017 – Blind Boys of Alabama – See by Faith

== Documentaries ==
- 2018 – Rifles & Rosemary Beads – Mary Gauthier'
- 2015 – Soundtrack to a Ghost Story – The Orphan Brigade
