= Among the Oak & Ash (album) =

Studio album by Among the Oak & Ash
- Released: June 16, 2009
- Length: 36:43
- Label: Verve

Among the Oak & Ash chronology
Among the Oak & Ash (2009)	Devil Ship (2013)

Professional ratings
Review scores
Source	Rating
AllMusic	3.5/5 stars
Redefine	A

Among the Oak & Ash is the first album by the group Among the Oak & Ash, which at the time consisted of Josh Joplin and Garrison Starr. It was released on June 16, 2009, by Verve Records.

== Track listing ==
1. "Hiram Hubbard" – 3:39
2. "Peggy-O" – 2:50
3. "Angel Gabriel" – 2:49
4. "Shady Grove" – 1:52
5. "The Water Is Wide" – 5:31
6. "The Housewife's Lament" – 2:35
7. "Pretty Saro" – 1:19
8. "All the Pretty Little Horses" – 3:04
9. "Come All You Fair and Tender Ladies" – 0:49
10. "Joseph Hillström 1879–1915" – 3:41
11. "Look Down That Lonesome Road" – 3:03
12. "High, Low & Wide" – 5:15
13. "Bigmouth Strikes Again" – 2:56
