= Pistolero =

Pistolero is the Spanish word for gunfighter.

Pistolero may also refer to:

- Pistolero (album), by Frank Black and the Catholics
- "Pistolero" (song), by Juno Reactor
- "Pistolero" (Dschinghis Khan song), by Dschinghis Khan
- Alberto Contador, Spanish cyclist nicknamed "El Pistolero"
- Luis Suárez (Uruguayan footballer), Uruguayan footballer nicknamed "El Pistolero"
- Kostas Mitroglou, Greek footballer nicknamed "Pistolero"

Pistolera may refer to:

- Pistolera (DC Comics), a comic book supervillain
- Pistolera (band), a Brooklyn band
