= We Can Replace You =

Studio album by The Cells
- Released: 2002
- Genres: Alternative rock Indie rock Pop punk
- Length: 34:33
- Labels: Old Reliable Records; Orange Recordings
- Producer: Andrew Gerber

The Cells chronology
We Can Replace You	Mayday

We Can Replace You is the debut CD of the Chicago-based rock band, The Cells. It was released in 2002 on Orange Recordings. The disc was recorded and produced by Andrew Gerber at Million Yen Studio.

== History ==
The disc was recorded by the band's initial founding lineup consisting of singer/guitarist Cory Hance, singer/guitarist Pat McIntyre, bassist Brede Hovland, and drummer Randy Payne over the course of a year. Though Million Yen Studio has since moved to a larger, more studio-like location, We Can Replace You was tracked and mixed in Andy Gerber's apartment in Chicago's Humboldt Park neighborhood, with his upstairs neighbor's kitchen serving as the isolation room for the drums and bass. Founding bassist Brede Hovland laid down his final bass and vocal tracks just a day before leaving the band and Chicago to pursue a film production career in Los Angeles.

After the album's completion, the band shipped it to independent labels and found a match with Orange Recordings, who released it in 2002. The disc garnered respectable airplay, gaining the #2 slot on the summer 2002 CMJ music listings behind Sonic Youth, and favorable press. The song "Silver Cloud" gained the band wider recognition from mainstream listeners as a free music sample on Dell computers.

After touring behind We Can Replace You as a 3-piece, Hance, McIntyre and Payne parted ways. Payne and McIntyre formed the band Cisco Pike and Hance continued recording and performing under The Cells' name, recruiting drummer Mark Doyle and bassist Johnny Furman. The new Cells lineup completed the band's second CD Mayday in 2006, available on their own imprint, Old Reliable Records.

== Track listing ==
1. "Silver Cloud"
2. "All Be Happy"
3. "Say Hello"
4. "What You Did"
5. "Awkward"
6. "Stupid Guy"
7. "Fluff"
8. "I Go Out"
9. "Spaceman"
10. "Vinyl"

== Personnel ==
- Pat McIntyre - Vocals, Guitar
- Cory Hance - Vocals, Guitar
- Brede Hovland - Bass
- Randy Payne - Drums
