= The Low Lows (band) =

Former Americana band

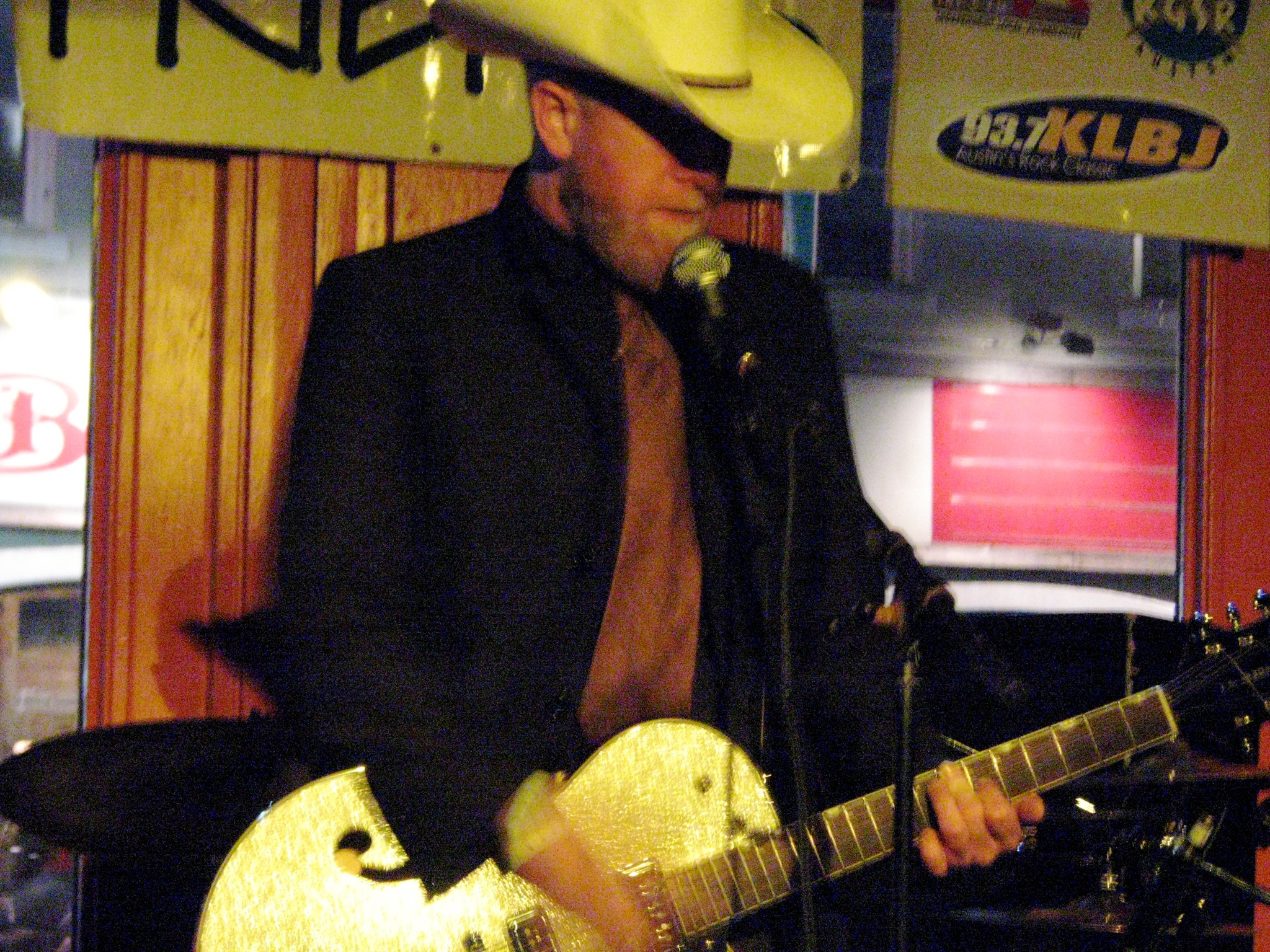
- Parker of The Low Lows

Background information
- Origin: Athens, Georgia, United States
- Genres: Alt-country; Progressive country Lo-fi; Indie rock Alternative rock Slowcore; Americana; Experimental
- Years active: 2005-2015
- Labels: Warm; Misra; Monotreme
- Spinoffs: Monk Parker
- Past members: Mangham Parker aka Parker Noon; Brockett Hamilton; Matt Verta-Ray; Zachary Larkins; Daniel Rickard; Jeremy Wheatley; Lily Wolfe; Bryan Crowell; Heidi Johnson; Greg McCue; Matt Bricker; Darian Mola Momanee; Nick Warrenchuck; Kullen Fuchs; Mike St.Claire; Paul Simpson; Eva Hanna; Mikey Dwyer; Abram Shook; Page Campbell; Matt Stossel; John Neff; Patrick Ferguson; Brent Jones; Josiah McG; Amanda Kapousouz; Perrish and Bassam Mussad; Kevin and David Nelson; Jared Theis; Brandon Newton; Christina Campanella
- Website: MySpace page thelowlows.com

The Low Lows were an American avant-garde Americana/alternative country band. Their final lineup consisted of Mangham Parker, Brockett Hamilton, Matt Verta-Ray and Zachary Larkins.

== History ==
The Low Lows were formed in Athens, Georgia in 2005, originally consisting of lead vocalist and guitarist Mangham Parker (aka Parker Noon), organist Daniel Rickard, and drummer Jeremy Wheatley, all of whom were former members of the band Parker and Lily. Following Rickard and Wheatley's departure in 2008, there were several other musicians who joined and left (see § Band members), which left Parker as the only consistent member of the band post-2008.

The Low Lows toured with large line-ups – up to 14 members – in the U.S. and Europe. Their live performances were well-received in music publications. They performed at the Austin City Limits Music Festival.

In 2006, they released their debut album, Fire On the Bright Sky, followed by their single Elizabeth Pier (2007) and in 2008, they released their second full-length album Shining Violence. After three years of touring, in early February 2011, it was reported that in the upcoming months, they would be releasing a new full-length album titled Gaudy Frame, however the album was postponed. In March of 2013, it was reported that two new albums would be released in succession the same year. These were identified as the above-mentioned Gaudy Frame and a second album titled Light All The Lights, but were never released. They disbanded and Monk Parker (also used as an alias of Mangham Parker) was formed as a spin-off in 2015.

== Genre ==
The Low Lows songs are often described as haunting, surreal, and melancholic. The use of noise and feedback is a feature on many songs by the group, and is especially prevalent during the chorus sections.

Their style is consistently referred to as experimental, lo-fi alternative rock. For reasons not yet explained by the band, their MySpace page defines their style as simply thrash. They have been compared to bands such as South San Gabriel, Castanets, My Morning Jacket, Phosphorescent, and Band of Horses.

== Band members ==
=== Final lineup ===
- Mangham Parker (aka Parker Noon) - lead vocals, guitar (2005–2015)
- Matt Verta-Ray (2005–2015)
- Brockett Hamilton - lap steel guitar, harmonica (2009–2015)
- Zachary Larkins (2012–2015)

=== Past/Touring/Contributing members ===
- Daniel Rickard - acoustic guitar, bass organ, harmonica, vocals (2005–2008)
- Jeremy Wheatley - drums (on the first 5 tours and 2 records) (2005–2008)
- Lily Wolfe (on the first 3 tours and 2 records) - organs etc. (2005–2008)
- Christina Campanella (2005-2008)
- Abram Shook - organ (Euro Tour '08) (2008-2008)
- Patrick Ferguson - drums (2008-2008)
- Bryan Crowell - guitar, farfisa, rhodes bass (2009-2012)
- Nick Warrenchuck - trombone drums (2009-2011)
- Greg McCue - drums (2009-2011)
- Heidi Johnson - trombone, acetone organ, Wurlitzer (2009-2010)
- Kullen Fuchs - trumpet and vibraphone (2009-2010)
- Mike St.Claire - trombone and trumpet (2009-2011)
- Matt Bricker - trumpet, acetone organ (2009-2010)
- Brandon Newton (2012-2012)
- Mikey Dwyer - bass (Euro Tour '08)
- Eva Hanna - bass
- Page Campbell - guitar
- Matt Stossel - steel guitar
- John Neff- steel guitar
- Brent Jones - drums
- Josiah McG - drums
- Amanda Kapousouz - strings
- Perrish and Bassam Mussad - trumpets
- Kevin and David Nelson - trombones
- Jared Theis - clarinet
- Darian Mola Momanee - trumpet and tambourine
- Paul Simpson - singing saw
- Nick Warrenchuk - trombone

== Discography ==
=== Full-length albums ===
- Fire On the Bright Sky - 2006 (Warm)
- Shining Violence - 2008 (Monotreme)

=== Singles ===
- Elizabeth Pier - 2007 (Monotreme)
