= Strays Don't Sleep (album) =

Studio album by Strays Don't Sleep
- Released: May 1, 2006
- Recorded: 2005
- Studios: Mr. Lemons – Eastside, Nashville
- Genre: Alternative country
- Label: One Little Indian
- Producers: Matthew Ryan, Neilson Hubbard

Professional ratings
Review scores
Source	Rating
AllMusic	3.5/5 stars
The Skinny	2/5 stars

Strays Don't Sleep is an album by Strays Don't Sleep. It was released in 2006 by One Little Indian. The band made short films to accompany the album.

== Critical reception ==
AllMusic called Strays Don't Sleep "a small gem of an album." The Skinny wrote: "It's a nice enough collection of songs, drawing on every last trick from the melancholy-acoustic textbook, the only trouble is that not one of the nine songs on offer raises the stakes beyond average." Paste wrote that "from its dark, understated melodies and instrumentation to its elegant production, this record is an archetype for urban folk music." The Sunday Times called the album "a work of fragile, studio-bound electronica."

== Track listing ==
=== CD ===
1. "Love Don't Owe You Anything" —
  Words – Matthew Ryan; Music – Matthew Ryan, Neilson Hubbard
2. "Pretty Girl" —
  Words – Neilson Hubbard; Music – Neilson Hubbard, Matthew Ryan
3. "Martin Luther Avenue" —
  Words – Matthew Ryan; Music – Matthew Ryan, Neilson Hubbard
4. "Night Is Still" —
  Words – Neilson Hubbard; Music – Matthew Ryan, Neilson Hubbard
5. "For Blue Skies" —
  Words – Matthew Ryan; Music – Neilson Hubbard, Matthew Ryan
6. "Spirit Fingers" —
  Words – Neilson Hubbard; Music – Matthew Ryan, Neilson Hubbard
7. "April's Smiling At Me" —
  Words – Neilson Hubbard; Music – Matthew Ryan, Neilson Hubbard
8. "Cars And History" —
  Words – Matthew Ryan; Music – Neilson Hubbard, Matthew Ryan
9. "Falling Asleep With You" —
  Words – Neilson Hubbard; Music – Matthew Ryan, Neilson Hubbard
10. "You Belong to Me" [Bonus Track on US edition] —
  Words, Music – Pee Wee King, Redd Stewart, Shilton Price
11. "Stay" [Bonus Track on US edition] —
  Words, Music – Paul Buchanan, Robert Bell

=== DVD ===
1. "Love Don't Owe You Anything"
  Directed by The Barnes Brothers
2. "Pretty Girl"
  Directed by Martin Glenn
3. "Martin Luther Avenue"
  Directed by Neilson Hubbard, Matthew Ryan; Shot, Edited by Matt Riddlehoover
4. "Night Is Still"
  Directed by Martin Glenn
5. "For Blue Skies"
  Directed by Matthew Ryan, Neilson Hubbard; Shot, Edited by Matt Riddlehoover, Neilson Hubbard, Matthew Ryan; Featuring Mark Cabus
  The Film Inside The Film – Directed by Abe Bradshaw, Edited by James "Buddy" Villani
6. "Spirit Fingers"
  Directed by Jared Johnson
7. "April's Smiling At Me"
  Directed by Matt Boyd
8. "Cars And History"
  Directed by Gorman Bechard; Featuring scenes from his film You Are Alone
9. "Falling Asleep With You"
  Directed by Matthew Ryan; Shot by Lauwrence Boothy, Tonie Floyd; Edited by Rich Jegen, Kenny Bernstein
10. "Pretty Girl" [Bonus Version]
  Directed by Matt Boyd

== Personnel ==
- Neilson Hubbard – vocals, Guitar, synth, Piano, Loops, percussion
- Matthew Ryan – vocals, Guitar, synth, Piano, Bass, percussion
- Brian Bequette – Guitar, Bass, Accordion
- Billy Mercer – Bass
- Steve Lantanation – drums, percussion, backing vocals
- Produced by Matthew Ryan, Neilson Hubbard
- Recorded by Neilson Hubbard at Mr. Lemons – Eastside, Nashville
- Mixed by Neilson Hubbard, Matthew Ryan at Mr. Lemons – Eastside, Nashville
- Spirit Fingers – Mixed by Richard McLaurin at Mr. Lemons – Eastside, Nashville
- Mastered by Marc Chevalier at Yes Master – Westside, Nashville

=== Films ===
- Executive Producer – Kenny Bernstein
- Produced by Matthew Ryan, Neilson Hubbard
- 5.1 Surround Sound – Mixed, Mastered by Paul PDub Walton, London
- Digitized, Compiled, Sweetened, Authored by Rich Jegen
- Menu Page Designed by Robert Bright
- Cover – Self Portrait by Christie Creasy
- Back Panel Photo by Sharlene France
- Design, Layout by Jay Johnson
- Legal Services – Trip Aldredge
- Booking – Little Big Man
- Contact, Inquiries – info@straysdontsleep.com

=== Additional musicians ===
- Doug Lancio – Baritone, Guitar, percussion
- Jeff Patterson – Tambourine
- Garrison Starr – backing vocals on Spirit Fingers
- Clay Steakley – Bass
- Kate York – backing vocals on For Blue Skies
