= Awkward =

Awkward may refer to:

- Awkwardness or embarrassment, an emotional state of intense discomfort with people
- Awkward (TV series), an American teen comedy series
- Awkward (album), a 2001 album by Ty
- Awkward, a 1999 graphic novel by Ariel Schrag
- Awkward (graphic novel), a 2015 graphic novel by Svetlana Chmakova
- "Awkward", a song by Band-Maid from Just Bring It
- "Awkward", a song by The Cells from We Can Replace You
- "Awkward", a song by Lostprophets from The Fake Sound of Progress
- "Awkward" (song), a 2011 song by San Cisco
- "Awkward", a song by SZA from the 2022 deluxe edition of Ctrl (2017)
- "Awkward", a song by Tyler, the Creator from Wolf
