= Patrick Ferguson (disambiguation) =

Patrick Ferguson was a Scottish army officer.

Patrick or Pat Ferguson is also the name of:

- Patrick Ferguson (drummer)
- Pat Ferguson, character played by Richard Riehle
- Pat Ferguson, in 1963 24 Hours of Le Mans
