= Hello Halo =

Studio album by Parker and Lily
- Released: August 21, 2001
- Genre: Pop rock; alternative rock/indie; rock; lo-fi; indie pop; dream pop
- Length: 33:23
- Label: Orange Recordings

Parker and Lily chronology
| Hello Halo (2001) | Here Comes Winter (2002) |

Professional ratings
Review scores
| Source | Rating |
|---|---|
| AllMusic | 3/5 stars |
| Fakejazz | 9/12 stars |

Hello Halo is the first album by Parker and Lily. It was released on August 21, 2001 via the label, Orange Recordings.

== Track listing ==
1. "Two Years In Air" - 3:22
2. "Mandarin" - 2:05
3. "My Golden Arm" - 3:06
4. "P.S." - 3:29
5. "Waitress" - 3:00
6. "Tokyo" - 2:55
7. "Desert Holiday" - 3:46
8. "Morley" - 3:02
9. "Only Heartbreak For Me" - 2:58
10. "The World On Time" - 4:14
11. "What's An Oubliette?" - 1:26
