= Jaywalker (album) =

Studio album by Josh Joplin
- Released: August 23, 2005
- Genre: Rock, Pop
- Length: 42:07
- Label: Eleven Thirty
- Producer: Issa Diao, Josh Joplin

Josh Joplin chronology
The Future That Was (2002)	Jaywalker (2005)

Jaywalker is the first solo album by singer/songwriter Josh Joplin. Jaywalker was released on August 23, 2005 with Eleven Thirty Records

== Track listing ==
All songs written by Josh Joplin

1. "Mister New Years Day" – 3:29
2. "Pilgrim's Progress" – 4:08
3. "One Becomes Two" – 4:03
4. "Jaywalkers Of The World" – 3:33
5. "A Hard Year" – 3:59
6. "The World On A Shoestring" – 3:54
7. "To All My Friends" – 3:54
8. "Arms To Hold Me" – 2:47
9. "Empire State" – 4:02
10. "Mortimer's Ghost" – 4:23
11. "Stay" – 3:55
