= Five Eight =

Five Eight may refer to:

- Five Eight (band), a pop punk band from the Athens/Atlanta Georgia area.
- Five-eighth, a position in rugby league football.
