= Wonder Wheel (disambiguation) =

The Wonder Wheel is an eccentric Ferris wheel at Deno's Wonder Wheel Amusement Park, Coney Island, New York, US.

Wonder Wheel or Wonderwheel may also refer to:

== Cycling ==
- Wonder Wheels; The Autobiography of Eileen Sheridan, English cyclist
- Wonder Wheels, slogan used by Hercules Cycle and Motor Company, sponsors of Eileen Sheridan

== Film and television ==
- Wonder Wheel (film), a 2017 drama directed by Woody Allen
- Wonder Wheels, a cartoon produced by Hanna-Barbera Productions

== Music ==
- Wonder Wheel (album), by American band The Klezmatics
- "Wonder Wheel", a song from the album The Future That Was by American band Josh Joplin Group
- Wonderwheel, a band formed by American rock musician Gary Wright that existed from 1971 to 1972

== Sport ==
- Wonder Wheel (horse), an American thoroughbred race horse
