= Chris Verene =

American photographer, artist, filmmaker, and musician (born 1969)

Christopher Phillip Verene
- Born: October 29, 1969 (age 56); DeKalb, Illinois
- Education: Emory University; Georgia State University
- Spouse: Ani Cordero
- Father: Donald Verene
- Website: chrisverene.com

Christopher Phillip Verene (born October 29, 1969) is an American fine arts and documentary photographer, performance artist, and musician. He is a professor of photography at the College of Staten Island, CUNY. Verene was awarded a Guggenheim fellowship in 2021.

== Biography ==
Verene was born in DeKalb, Illinois, and is the son of philosopher Donald Verene. He spent his teens and twenties in Atlanta, Georgia and studied art and photography at Georgia State University after completing his undergraduate degree at Emory University. Verene moved to Brooklyn in 1999. In 2000, he was included in the Whitney Biennial with his 1998 series Camera Club and the performance installation piece The Self-Esteem Salon. That same year, his monograph about his father's hometown of Galesburg, Illinois, and about his mother's family in Georgia and Florida, Chris Verene, was published by Twin Palms Press. The New York Times reviewed his self-titled book in 2000: "Chris Verene is this year's most appealing newcomer, a diamond in the rough whose square color pictures record his family and friends in candid, unvarnished fashion. The book gets its gritty grip on reality by sticking to place, which happens to be Galesburg. The tacky interiors, worn clothes and forlorn expressions in the pictures suggest that all is not well in Galesburg, but Verene adds a commentary that tries its best to be upbeat and compassionate. The effect is reminiscent of Mark Goodman's visual diary of life in Millerton, N.Y., A Kind of History, which was published without fanfare a year ago. But the larger shadow hanging over Verene's work belongs to Diane Arbus, which is not a bad thing".

Three generations of Verene's family still live in Galesburg and the family and city are the subjects of his life's work—a thirty-year ongoing documentary project. At age 16, Verene began work with a medium format camera and started taking pictures of his family and friends within the small town of Galesburg. While having many diverse interests in music, film, and escape magic, the subject of his photographic career eventually became centered on the town of Galesburg and various events that take place within it. In 1998, The New York Times observed: "... anthropological portraits, like Chris Verene's of a cousin at her wedding banquet in Illinois... Such portraits tell us less about individual people than about the worlds they inhabit, which is perhaps the main truth of most portraits."

In a review of Verene's Galesburg portraits shown at Postmasters Gallery in 2010, Cora Fisher writes in The Brooklyn Rail: "At no point in their stories of separation, divorce, remarriage, and birth across generational ties, class differences, and economic changes do they seem any less than Verene's co-authors in the construction of their narrative."

Aside from his photographic work, Verene is also a musician and performance artist. While living in Atlanta, he co-founded musical groups D.Q.E. and the Rock*A*Teens. As a drummer, he performs and records nationally with Cordero, a band founded by his wife, Ani Cordero.
