= The Cells =

American rock band

- Origin: Chicago, Illinois, United States
- Genres: Indie rock, alternative rock, pop punk, power pop
- Years active: 1998–present
- Labels: Old Reliable, Orange, Million Yet
- Members: Cory Hance; Johnny Furman; Mark Doyle
- Past members: Brede Hovland; Randy Payne; Pat McIntyre; Rick Ness

The Cells is a 3-piece American rock band based in Chicago, currently made up of singer/guitarist Cory Hance, bassist Johnny Furman and drummer Mark Doyle.

The band was formed in 1998 by singer/guitarist Cory Hance and bassist Brede Hovland. Hovland then dropped out to work in the movie business, and Hance, guitarist/singer Pat McIntyre and drummer Randy Payne continued the band with guest bassists such as Rick Ness, formerly of Fig Dish (a key Cells member during his stint), Skid Marks, of Box-O-Car, Josh James and Bob Rising . They released their debut album, "We Can Replace You" under Orange Recordings.

After touring behind We Can Replace You as a 3-piece, Hance, McIntyre and Payne parted ways. Payne and McIntyre formed the band Cisco Pike.

Hance recruited drummer Mark Doyle (formerly of Loud Lucy, Verbow and Woolworthy) and bassist Johnny Furman (formerly of The Webb Brothers, The Lupins and The Darlings) in late 2003. The new Cells lineup completed the band's second CD "Mayday" in 2006, available on their own imprint, Old Reliable Records.

== Discography ==
=== Studio albums ===
Year	Album	Label
2002	We Can Replace You	Orange Recordings
2006	Mayday	Million Yen Studios
