= Parker and Lily =

US musical group

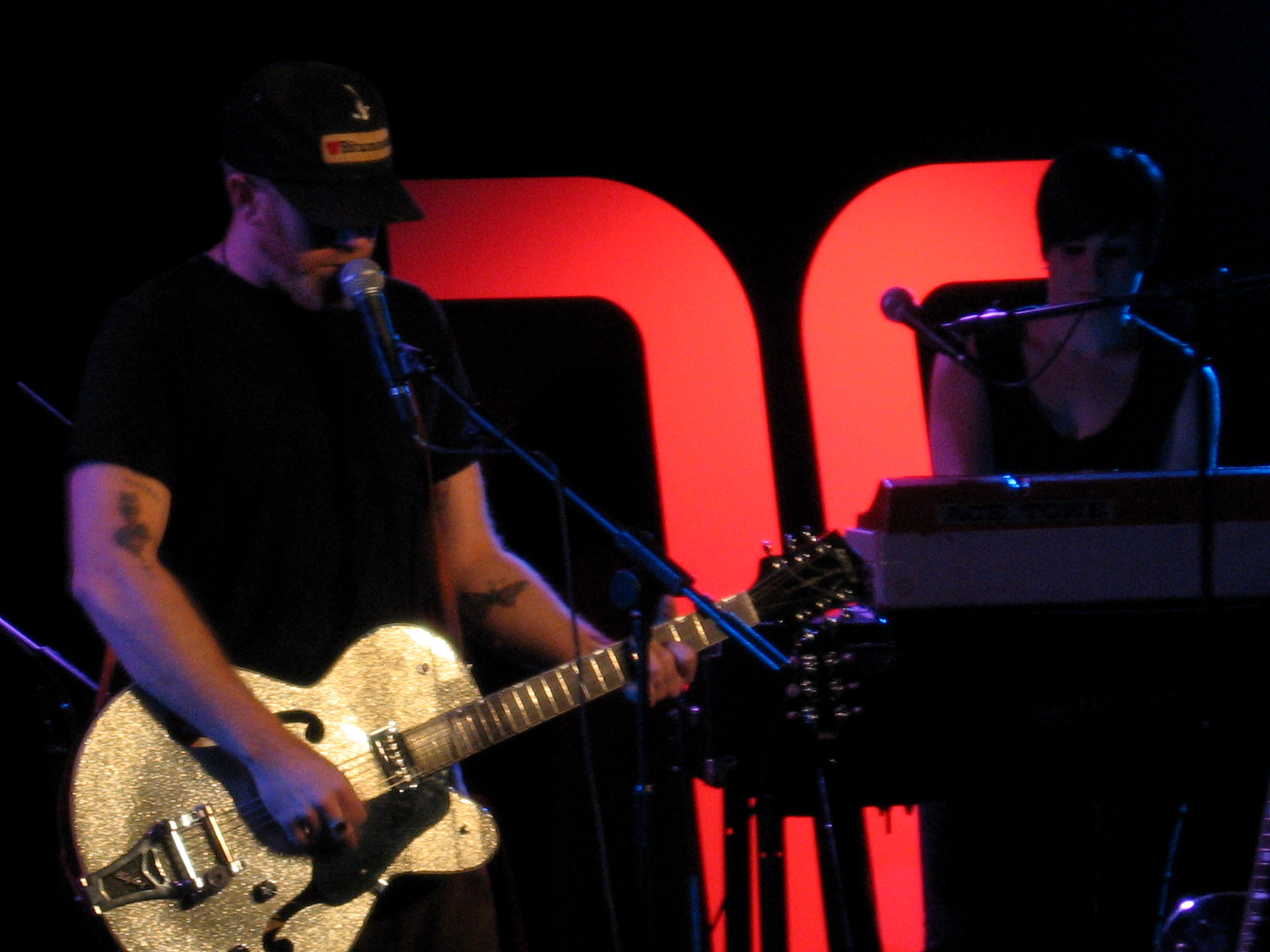
- Parker and Lily at Castellón

Background information
- Origin: New York City, New York, United States
- Genres: Indie rock Lo-fi; Experimental; Slow-core; Dream pop Indie pop
- Years active: 2000–2005
- Labels: Orange Recordings; Manifesto Records; Warm
- Past members: Parker Noon aka Mangham Parker; Lily Wolfe; Daniel Rickard; Jeremy Wheatley; Christina Campanella
- Website: MySpace page

Parker and Lily was an American experimental pop/rock duo originally from New York, NY and formed in 2000. Parker and Lily are not currently touring and have not released any new material since 2005; the band members are all working on other projects; Parker and Lily disbanded sometime in 2005.

Their style is often described as a combination of experimental, dream pop, indie rock, indie pop, slowcore and lo-fi. The band was originally composed of two former members of the band Valentine Six, Parker Noon (aka Mangham Parker) (vocalist) and Lily Wolfe (pianist). Organist Daniel Rickard and drummer Jeremy Wheatley were later added to the Parker and Lily live lineup. In 2004, during the recording of their third and most recent album (The Low Lows, released in 2005), Noon and Wolfe's decade-long romantic relationship ended. However, despite their breakup, Noon and Wolfe finished the album together.

After finishing the recording of The Low Lows, Noon and Wolfe took a five-month hiatus and then regrouped to perform and work on new material. However, this new material has yet to be released. In 2005, Noon collaborated with the other Parker and Lily members, Wheatley and Rickard, to form a new band named The Low Lows (using the name of Parker and Lily's third album The Low Lows). The Low Lows have since released two full-length albums, one in 2006 and the other in 2008.

Despite Noon and Wolfe's break-up, according to The Low Lows’ myspace page, Wolfe toured with The Low Lows for their first three tours and contributed to the making of The Low Lows’ first two albums. Wolfe has stated on her Myspace page (and The Low Lows' Monotreme Records Artists' page coroberates) that she wants to focus only on making music for movies.

== Band members ==
=== Former main members ===
- Parker Noon (aka Mangham Parker) - lead vocals (Vox), guitars
- Lily Wolfe - vocals (Vox), piano (Rhodes), organs (Conn, Acetone)
- Daniel Rickard - organ (Farfisa), engineer
- Jeremy Wheatley - drums

=== Other former members ===
- Christina Campanella - organ (Farfisa), keyboards (Rhodes Bass), cymbals, tambourine, vocals (Vox)

== Discography ==
=== Full length albums ===
- Hello Halo LP - 2001 (Orange Recordings)
- Here Comes Winter LP - 2002 (Manifesto Records)
- The Low Lows LP - 2005 (Warm)
