= Here Comes Winter =

Studio album by Parker and Lily
- Released: September 24, 2002
- Genre: Pop rock; alternative rock/indie; rock; lo-fi; indie pop; dream pop
- Length: 43:55
- Label: Manifesto

Parker and Lily chronology
Hello Halo (2001)	Here Comes Winter (2002)	The Low Lows (2005)

Professional ratings
Review scores
Source	Rating
AllMusic	3.5/5 stars
Fakejazz	10/12 stars
Artistdirect	3.5/5 stars

Here Comes Winter is the second album by Parker and Lily. It was released on September 24, 2002 via the label, Manifesto Records.

== Track listing ==
1. "Hello Halo" - 3:24
2. "My Apartment Complex" - 2:03
3. "Idle In Idlewild" - 2:10
4. "You Are My Matinee" - 2:44
5. "Violet in Violet" - 3:11
6. "Bridge and Tunnel" - 3:08
7. "Motel Lights" - 2:53
8. "In Bonn" - 3:03
9. "Planes in Clouds" - 2:53
10. "Snow Day" - 4:34
11. "Interior: Airport" - 1:32
12. "Three-Day Life" - 3:12
13. "Separate Rooms" - 3:04
14. "For C.L. (Iowa Is Passing By)" - 3:53
15. "Hey Sau Jin" - 2:11
