= Cash Audio =

American rock band

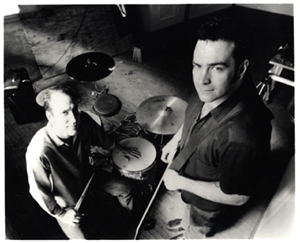
- John Humphrey and Scott Giampino

Background information
- Origin: Chicago, Illinois, United States
- Genres: minimalist blues
- Years active: 1996 – 2002
- Labels: Touch and Go Records, Orange Recordings

Cash Audio was an American rock band based in Chicago, Illinois. Formed in 1996 as a guitar-and-drums duo consisting of John Humphrey and Scott Giampino, they released three full-length albums for Touch and Go Records and a variety of singles and a full-length for Orange Recordings. Cash Audio toured nationally and performed live until 2002.

== History ==
Cash Audio was originally named Cash Money and was formed in 1996 by John Humphrey and Scott Giampino while playing with The Late Great Danes. Humphrey's previous band was God and Texas (Ohio/ Chicago on Rave and Restless Records), while Giampino played with local Chicago group the Mystery Girls while also doing a stint with the infamous GG Allin and the Toilet Rockers. Conceived as a two-piece rock band, the duo's style quickly led them to be categorized in the blues minimalist genre that gained popularity in the late 1990s and early 2000s. They were known for their strong musicianship and great live shows (including frying bacon on stage with a hot plate). Cash Audio's music covered a variety of classic styles, including rock, blues, country, and R&B. During the early 2000s the final recordings of the group focused on strong thematic instrumentals.

== Naming Controversy ==
Originally named Cash Money, the band received national attention in 1999 in Rolling Stone # 814, in a humorous sidebar piece comparing Cash Money's low-key touring style (two guys in a station wagon) to the excesses of the hip-hop stars of New Orleans' Cash Money Records. Lawyers from Cash Money Records quickly sent Touch and Go Records a cease and desist for Cash Money "the band". Fresh off the legal settlements with several other acts and in order to avoid the costs of another legal battle, Corey Rusk, President of Touch and Go, and the band decided to change their name to Cash Audio for their upcoming Green Bullet release in 2000.

== Recording and touring history 1996- 2002 ==
Cash Audio had a strict discipline for analog recording and recorded exclusively in Chicago from 1996 to 2001, at Idful Music Corporation, King Size, Clava and Engine Studios, with a single session at Chase Park Transductions in Athens, Georgia, in 1999. Three full-length albums were released by Touch and Go Records, while four releases and all its vinyl recordings were released on Orange Recordings

Cash Audio toured and performed with many well known acts on the Touch and Go label including, Calexico, Girls Against Boys, Killdozer, Man or Astroman, The Delta 72, Arcwelder, P.W. Long, New Wet Kojak and Silkworm. They also toured or performed with numerous bands on Seattle's Sub Pop label, including the Supersuckers, Zen Guerilla and Mudhoney.

Cash Audio's last live performance was the opening slot for Mudhoney on September 21, 2002, at Chicago's Abbey Pub. In 2008 a recording from 1999 done for a Killdozer compilation tribute album was released.

== Discography ==
=== As Cash Money ===
- 1997- Oil Can 7”- Tug of War Records
- 1997- Black Hearts and Broken Wills CD- Touch and Go Records
- 1998- Halos of Smoke and Fire CD- Touch and Go Records
- 1999- Letter to Stax “2 x 7” - Double 45 rpm vinyl- Orange Recordings

=== As Cash Audio ===
- 2000- Green Bullet CD- Touch and Go Records
- 2001- The Orange Sessions CD & 12 inch Vinyl- Orange Recordings
- 2002- The Orange Sessions Vol 2 - 12 inch Vinyl- Orange Recordings
- 2008- “Lupus”- We will bury you- A tribute to Killdozer- Crustacean Records
