= Ani Cordero =

Puerto Rican musician (born 1974)

- Born: Ana Marieli Cordero Garcia; 1974 (age 51–52); Boston, Massachusetts
- Occupation: Musician
- Instruments: Drums; guitar; percussion; vocals
- Formerly of: Man or Astro-man?; Dean and Britta; Josh Joplin Group; Angels of Light; Bee and Flower; #1 Family Mover; Os Mutantes; Rasputina; Pistolera

Ani Cordero (born 1974) is an American vocalist, drummer, guitarist, and songwriter.

== Biography ==
Cordero was born Ana Marieli Cordero Garcia in Boston, Massachusetts. Since 1999, she has resided in Brooklyn, New York.

Cordero's work in music began in her teen years in Atlanta, Georgia. She has performed as a solo artist as well as a number of bands, including Cordero, her bilingual rock group with husband and drummer Chris Verene. She has recorded and toured both nationally and internationally.

From the 1980s until 2009, Cordero performed with Man or Astro-man?, Dean and Britta, Josh Joplin Group, Angels of Light, Bee and Flower, and #1 Family Mover. Between 2010 and 2013, she performed with Os Mutantes, Rasputina, Cordero, Tuff Sunshine, and Pistolera, which she helped create.

In 2014, Cordero released her first solo album, Recordar, consisting of covers of Latin American protest songs. In 2017, she released a second solo album, Querido Mundo. Her third album, El Machete, came out in 2019.

== Activism ==
In 2017, Cordero and Raquel Berrios from the band Buscabulla formed a nonprofit activist organization called PRIMA (Puerto Rico Independent Musicians and Artists). The PRIMA Fund was established to provide emergency assistance to musicians and artists in Puerto Rico after the devastating effects of hurricanes Irma and Maria. The organization has given over seventy grants and organized multiple concerts and events.

== Discography ==
Year	Artist	Album	Notes
1997	#1 Family Mover	#1 Family Mover	Drums, percussion, vocals
1999	Jack Logan	Buzz Me In	Percussion
1999	Ani Cordero	Girl-Child-Spirit	Vocals, guitar, drums
1999	Josh Joplin Band	Useful Music	Background vocals
2001	Various artists	This Is Next Year: A Brooklyn-Based Compilation	Drums
2002	Cordero	Lamb Lost in the City	Guitar, percussion, vocals, production
2003	Bee and Flower	What's Mine Is Yours	Drums, vocals
2004	Cordero	Somos Cordero	Guitar, timbales, vocals
2005	Cordero	En Este Momento	Guitar, percussion, vocals, production
2005	Various artists	For a Decade of Sin: 11 Years of Bloodshot Records	Guitar, vocals
2005	Josh Joplin	Jaywalker	Percussion, background vocals
2005	Pistolera	Pistolera	Drums, background vocals
2006	Pistolera	Siempre Hay Salida	Percussion, background vocals
2008	Cordero	De Donde Eres	Percussion
2008	Pistolera	En Este Camino	Drums, vocals
2014	Ani Cordero	Recordar	Vocals, guitar, drums, percussion
2017	Ani Cordero	Querido Mundo	Vocals, guitar, drums, percussion
2019	Ani Cordero	El Machete	Vocals, guitar, drums, percussion
