= Shining Violence =

Studio album by The Low Lows
- Released: March 3, 2008
- Genre: Alt-country; Progressive country Lo-fi; Indie rock Alternative rock Slowcore; Americana
- Length: 40:48
- Label: Monotreme

The Low Lows chronology
Elizabeth Pier (Single) (2007)	Shining Violence (2008)

Professional ratings
Review scores
Source	Rating
AbsolutePunk	(6.8/10)
PopMatters	6/10 stars
Subba-cultcha	7/10 stars
Rateyourmusic	(3.2/5)

Shining Violence is the second full-length album by The Low Lows. It was released on March 3, 2008 via the label, Monotreme.

== Track listing ==
1. "Sparrows" - 4:11 - Preview Song at Monotreme Records (Link)
2. "Raining In Eva" - 4:40
3. "Modern Romance" - 4:00
4. "Elizabeth Pier" - 3:01
5. "Tigers" - 4:18
6. "Disappear" - 3:49
7. "Five Ways I Didn't Die" - 5:57
8. "It May Be Low" - 5:15
9. "Honey" - 5:37
