= Fire on the Bright Sky =

Fire On The Bright Sky

Studio album by The Low Lows
- Released: September 12, 2006
- Genre: Alt-country; Progressive country Lo-fi; Indie rock Alternative rock Slowcore; Americana
- Length: 48:33
- Label: Warm

The Low Lows chronology
Fire On The Bright Sky (2006)	Elizabeth Pier (Single) (2007)

Professional ratings
Review scores
Source	Rating
Allmusic	3.5/5 stars
Pitchfork Media	(7.3/10)
Answers	3/5 stars
PopMatters	8/10 stars

Fire On the Bright Sky is the first album by The Low Lows. It was released on September 12, 2006, via the label, Warm.

== Track listing ==
1. "Dear Flies, Love Spider" - 5:26
2. "White Liner" - 5:29
3. "Velvet" - The Low Lows, Rickard, Daniel - 4:36
4. "St. Neil" - 4:10
5. "Wolves Eat Dogs" - 5:47
6. "Lane Fire" - 3:45
7. "Poor Georgia" - 5:29
8. "(No Such Thing As) Sara Jane" - 5:19
9. "Aquanaut" - The Low Lows, Wolfe, Lily - 4:05
10. "The Russian Ending" - 4:27
