= The Low Lows =

Studio album by Parker and Lily
- Released: January 25, 2005
- Genre: Pop rock; alternative rock/indie; rock; lo-fi; indie pop; dream pop
- Length: 38:39
- Label: Warm

Parker and Lily chronology
Here Comes Winter (2002)	The Low Lows (2005)

Professional ratings
Review scores
Source	Rating
AllMusic	4/5 stars
Popmatters	6/10 stars
Artistdirect	4/5 stars

The Low Lows is the third album by Parker and Lily. It was released on January 25, 2005, via the label, Warm Records, now known as Warm Electronic Recordings.

== Track listing ==
1. "Low Lows" - 5:08
2. "I Am a Gun" - 4:58
3. "June Gloom" - 5:47
4. "User's Guide" - 3:02
5. "Last Goodnight" - 5:02
6. "Suit of Fire" - 2:34
7. "Invisible Cities" - 3:06
8. "Candy's Last Day" - 5:11
9. "Smashing Party" - 3:51
