= Among the Oak & Ash =

American folk rock band

- Origin: New York City, U.S.
- Genres: Rock, folk
- Years active: 2008–present
- Label: Verve
- Members: Josh Joplin; Bryan Owings; Garrison Starr
- Past members: Brian Harrison

Among the Oak & Ash is an American folk rock band founded in 2008 by songwriter, composer, and producer Josh Joplin. The group was rounded out by vocalist and guitarist Garrison Starr, producer and bassist Brian Harrison, and drummer Bryan Owings. As of 2026, they have released three albums: Among the Oak & Ash (2009), Devil Ship (2013), and Figure Drawing (2023), featuring a variety of guest musicians. Harrison died in 2014.

== Releases ==
=== Among the Oak & Ash: 2009 ===
The group released their debut, self-titled album in 2009. Their version of "Shady Grove" is featured in the Alan Wake video game series. The record was featured on Bob Harris's Sunday Country and Roots Music show on BBC Radio 2 as well as NPR's Mountain Stage, WNYC's SoundCheck, and Woodsongs.

=== Devil Ship: 2013 ===
Produced by Joplin and Harrison, the band's sophomore record, Devil Ship, features musicians Paleface, Jessica Lea Mayfield, Lucy Wainwright Roche, Robby Turner, Front Country's touring bassist, Jeremy Darrow, Cari Norris, Bailey Cooke, Wes Langlois, David Mayfield, and members of Ghostfinger, Richie Kirkpatrick (guitar) and Ben Martin (drums). The album artwork was created by visual artist Julia Kuo, who also designed the cover for the band's debut.

== Discography ==
- Among the Oak & Ash (2009)
- Devil Ship (2013)
- Figure Drawing (2023)
