= Strays Don't Sleep =

- Genre: Alternative country
- Years active: 2005–2006; 2020
- Label: One Little Indian
- Members: Matthew Ryan; Neilson Hubbard; Billy Mercer; Brian Bequette; Steve Lantanation
- Website: www.straysdontsleep.com

Strays Don't Sleep was a Nashville-based band, a collaborative project between singer/songwriters Matthew Ryan and Neilson Hubbard. They released their debut self-titled album in 2006. In 2020 they reunited to record the extended play (EP) A Short Film For a Long Story.

== History ==
Matthew Ryan approached Neilson Hubbard in 2004 about a collaboration, which could result in an interesting self-distributed release for fans. The collaboration was much more successful than expected and Strays Don’t Sleep was formed with Neilson Hubbard, Brian Bequette, Billy Mercer and Steve Latanation.

In autumn 2005, Strays Don't Sleep’s debut self-titled album was released in the UK on One Little Indian. The release includes a DVD of short films that were directed and shot by professional filmmakers and friends, including Gorman Bechard, The Barnes Brothers, Martin Glenn, Matt Boyd and Jared Johnson. Matthew Ryan and Neilson Hubbard also directed three of the short films with the help of Nashville film student, Matt Riddlehoover. A 5.1 surround sound mix of the entire record and films, by Paul PDub Walton of Björk and Sneaker Pimps fame, is available on the DVD.

Strays Don't Sleep was released to great reviews from Timeout, Uncut, Sunday Express and The Times. The success helped secure a US release, which was helped further by a placement in the hit CW (former WB) drama One Tree Hill. "For Blue Skies", a song concerning the sentencing of Matthew Ryan’s brother to 30 years in prison, was made available on the One Tree Hill Soundtrack. The band toured the UK with Josh Rouse to support the album.

Strays Don't Sleep was officially disbanded mid-2006. They reunited to record the extended play (EP) A Short Film For a Long Story which was recorded during the COVID-19 pandemic and released on October 30, 2020.

== Recognition ==
Their music video DVD album, Strays Don't Sleep, with each song presented by a different director, won the top award – The Grand Remi for Best Music Video – at the 2006 WorldFest-Houston International Film Festival. The group performed in person at the Remi Awards gala dinner for 500 international filmmakers to a standing ovation.

== Discography ==
- Strays Don't Sleep (album, 2006)
- "Love Don't Owe You Anything" (single, 2006)
- A Short Film For a Long Story (EP, 2020)
