= Daniel Glass =

American music executive

- Born: Brooklyn, New York, U.S.
- Occupation: Music executive
- Years active: 1977–present
- Label: Glassnote

Daniel Glass is an American music industry executive whose output has included work with artists Billy Idol, Wilson Phillips, Sinéad O'Connor, Jon Secada, Warren Zevon, Blur, Huey Lewis and the News, Goldfinger, Reel Big Fish, Erykah Badu, Baha Men, Kurupt, The Pretenders, Sugarcult, and, in 2007, the launch of Glassnote Entertainment Group artists – Secondhand Serenade, Justin Nozuka, Grammy Award-winning Phoenix, Grammy Award winning Mumford & Sons, The Temper Trap, Two Door Cinema Club, Daughter, The Teskey Brothers, Rupert Bullard, Danny GriffithsHamilton Leithauser, Flight Facilities, TORS, Talia Rae, Chvrches, Grammy Award-winning Childish Gambino, Aurora, The Strumbella, The Teskey Brothers, Rupert Bullard, Danny Griffiths, Dylan Cartlidge, Ripe, Cecilia Castleman, Latin Grammy award best new artist Silvana Estrada, a Grammy award-winning spoken word record from His Holiness the Dalai Lama,and Jade Bird. In 2011 Rolling Stone magazine named Glassnote "Best Indie Label." In 2013 and 2014, Glassnote won the A2IM Libera award for Best Label of the Year. In December, 2015, Glass was named a CHEVALIER DE L'ORDRE DES ARTS ET DES LETTRES by the French Minister of Culture.

== Early years and the start of a music career ==
Glass was raised in Brooklyn, New York. In 1977, while engaged in pre-med studies at Brooklyn College, he began a stint as an R&B/dance disc jockey at the college's radio station WBCR. Still a student, he was subsequently hired as the first DJ for the influential discotheque, Regine's.

=== SAM Records ===
Glass joined the influential indie dance label SAM Records as vice president working with Gary's Gang, John Davis and the Monster Orchestra and the Evasions. He began focusing on developing artists’ careers, rather than just trying to pick hit records. Significantly, Glass promoted street bands when other more conservative and larger labels had not.

=== Chrysalis Records; Senior Vice President ===
Glass joined Chrysalis Records in 1983 as Director of New Music Marketing and was later appointed Senior Vice President. During his six years with Chrysalis, he helped guide the careers of such stars as Pat Benatar, Huey Lewis and the News, Billy Idol, Spandau Ballet, Jethro Tull, Icehouse, The Divinyls, Sinéad O'Connor and Was (Not Was), among others. He also developed a strong college and intern program, which cultivated a number of talented young executives who later went on to high-level positions throughout the entertainment industry.

=== SBK Records/EMI Record Group; President/CEO ===
In 1989, Glass joined SBK Records as Senior Vice President of Promotion. This quickly produced success in breaking new artists, including the multi-platinum debuts of Jesus Jones, Technotronic, Wilson Phillips, Vanilla Ice, as well at SBK/Liberty country artist Billy Dean.

In 1990, Glass was promoted to Executive Vice President/General Manager of SBK Records. A 1992 edition of Crain's New York Business profiled him ("Daniel Glass, 35, General Manager EMI Records Group North America") as one of the top "under forty" business executives. With the consolidation of SBK, Chrysalis, and EMI USA several years later into "EMI Record Group North America," he rose to President/CEO. In that position he was instrumental in bringing Jon Secada, Selena, Barrio Boyzz, Blur, D'Angelo, Roxette, Wilson Phillips, Vanilla Ice, Technotronic, and Arrested Development into platinum and Grammy Award-winning status, as well as the hit soundtrack to the critically acclaimed film, The Crying Game, which featured Boy George.

=== Rising Tide Records/Universal Records; President ===
In 1996, Glass joined Doug Morris (later, chairman of Universal Music Group), to start Rising Tide Records (subsequently Universal Records), with Glass as president.

The label had success in breaking new artists, including the multi-platinum debut of Erykah Badu, Billie Myers, Goldfinger, and the Lost Boyz. Recognizing the changing landscape of the industry, Glass strategically aligned Universal with such independent record labels as Kedar Entertainment, home to Erykah Badu, and Mojo Records, home to platinum artists Reel Big Fish and the Cherry Poppin' Daddies.

=== Artemis Records; President ===
In 1999 Glass joined Artemis Records as Executive Vice President. After a few months, he was named President and achieved success with the gold record rapper Kurupt, Grammy Award-winning Warren Zevon, rocker Steve Earle, gold record female hard rock group Kittie, the Pretenders and the triple platinum pop stars Baha Men. He also executive produced the Josh Joplin Group’s album, which was released in January 2001.

=== Glassnote Records ===
In 2007, Glass founded Glassnote Entertainment Group, encompassing a music label, publishing company, artist management, and merchandising. Among the artists signed to the label past and present are Danny Griffiths, Hamilton Leithauser, Two Door Cinema Club, Grammy Award Winning Phoenix, Grammy Award Winning Mumford & Sons, Daughter, Tors, Talia Rae, Dylan Cartlidge, The Teskey Brothers, Rupert Bullard, The Strumbellas, Flight Facilities, Robert DeLong, Jade Bird, Ripe, Cecilia Castleman, Patrick Martin, Edie Bens, [Grammy award-winning) Silvana Estrada and Half Moon Run. In 2012, the sophomore release by Glassnote artist Mumford & Sons became the biggest selling debut album of the year with first week sales of 600,000 units.* For the first release on the independent Glassnote Entertainment Group he chose Secondhand Serenade, the #1 unsigned artist in the history of MySpace, with 17 million plays and roughly 200,000 "friends." In 2013 Glassnote Records won the A2IM Libera Award for Best Label of the Year.

== Awards and leadership ==
- Vice Chair of the UJA Federation of New York, which honored him as 2002 Music Visionary of the Year.
- 2005 TJ Martell Family of the Year
- Founding Board President of LIFEbeat, an AIDS advocacy and hands-on service. organization he co-founded in April 1992.
- Founding Board Member of the Dance Music Hall of Fame.
- Vice President of The New York Music for Youth Foundation.
- Former Chairman/current member of the Development Committee and longtime former Trustee at The Dalton School.
- Has hosted the annual International Dance Music Awards (IDMA) in Miami Beach as he has done for the past 15 years
- Member of the Brooklyn College Foundation
- Daniel has run 29 NYC Marathons, 34 marathons total
- Daniel ran the 2010 Boston Marathon
- Became a Billboard Magazine Midem Master 2011
- Daniel ran the 2011 Hamptons Marathon
- Daniel was honored with a LIFETIME ACHIEVEMENT AWARD 2012 at the International Dance Music Awards in Miami Beach.
- Board Member of T.J Martell Foundation
- Named 2013 Musexpo International Music Person of the Year
- Named 2013 SESAC Visionary of the Year
- Won Musexpo International A & R Executive of the Year 2014
- Won 2014 Clio Award for Childish Gambino installation at Rough Trade Records, Brooklyn
- Listed in the Billboard Power 100 for 2013, 2014, 2015, 2016, 2017, 2018, 2019, 2021, 2023, 2024, 2025
- Named a Chevalier De L'Ordre Des Arts Et Des Lettres by the government of France in December 2015
- Board member of Children in Conflict, the American arm of Warchild
- Daniel was the 2026 Thomas J. Moran Music Award from the Caron Foundation

== Personal life ==
Daniel is the father of Sean Glass, noted DJ and founder of Win Music, Maxie Glass, a teacher, and Liam Glass.
