= The Farewell Drifters =

The Farewell Drifters are an American band based in Nashville, Tennessee. The quintet describes its music as "Harmonic Roots."

Their first album nationally distributed Yellow Tag Mondays received much critical praise and reviewers referred to the group's vocal harmony, songwriting, and retro sound as their defining elements. They were highlighted by Paste Magazine as the "Best of What's Next." Their follow-up June 2011 album "Echo Boom" debuted at No. 6 on the Billboard Bluegrass Charts.

== History ==
Mandolinist Joshua Britt and lead singer Zach Bevill became close friends after bonding over a mutual love of the ‘60s LPs they shared. They soon began writing and performing music together. Britt coming from a family of former touring musicians played in high school garage bands with his brother Clayton Britt in Franklin, Kentucky. Joshua brought brother Clayton along they added violinist Christian Sedelmyer and bassist Dean Marold after the move to Nashville. ] The Farewell Drifters have performed at large American music festivals such as MerleFest and were featured on the nationwide NPR program "Says You!" in 2009.

== Discography ==
=== Studio albums ===
Title	Details	Peak chart positions
Title	Details	US Grass
Yellow Tag Mondays	Release date: June 8, 2010; Label: Heart Squeeze Records; Formats: CD, music download	10
Echo Boom	Release date: June 7, 2011; Label: Heart Squeeze Records; Formats: CD, music download	6
Tomorrow Forever	Release date: January 28, 2014; Label: Compass Records; Formats: CD, music download	7
