= Andrew Gerber =

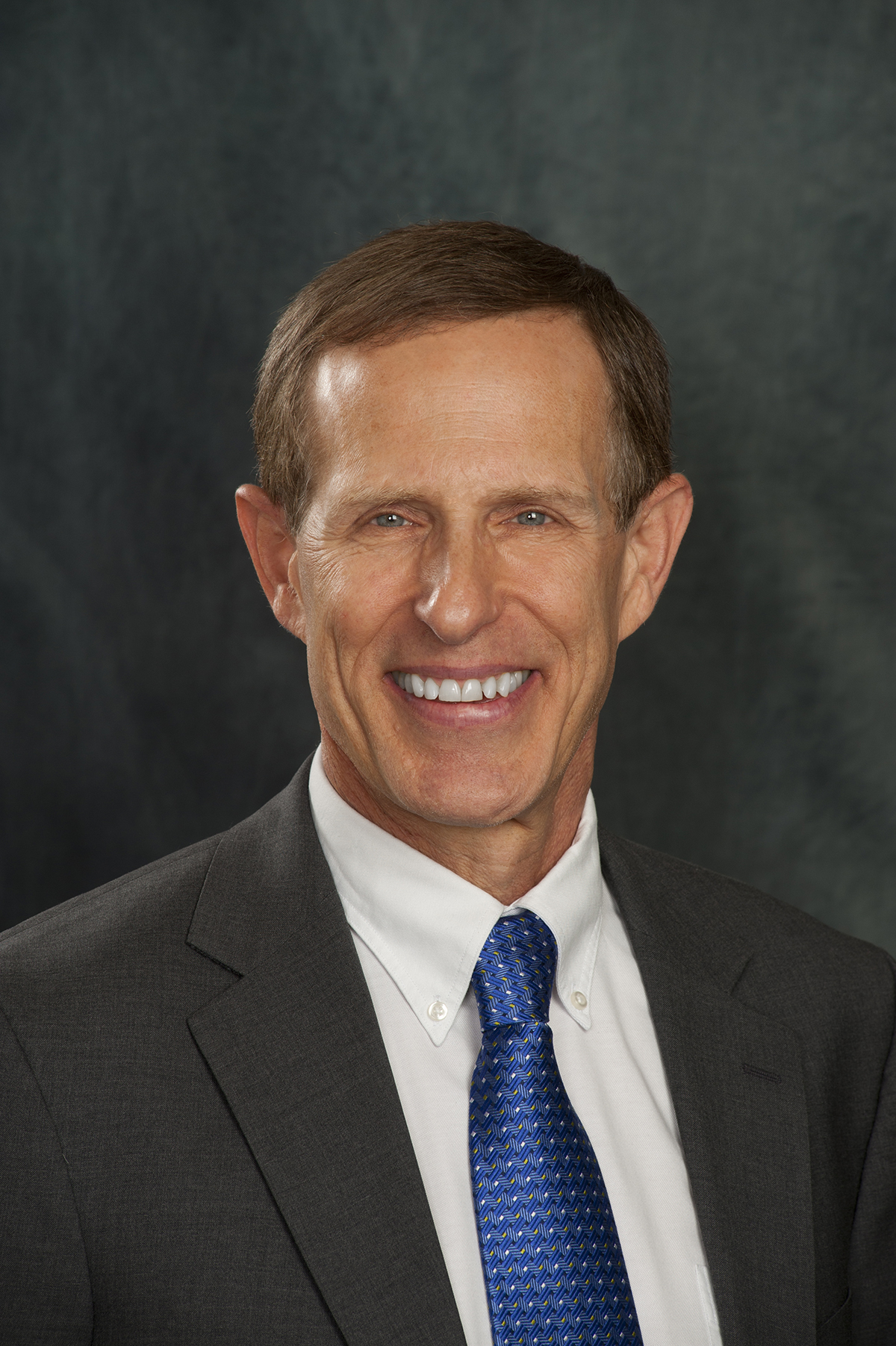
- Education: Duke University, Yale University
- Scientific career
- Workplaces: Georgia Institute of Technology, Georgia Tech Research Institute, Massachusetts Institute of Technology, MIT Lincoln Laboratory

Andrew Gerber is a physicist, aerospace researcher and technology executive who has held leadership and research positions in academia, government and industry.

== Education ==
Gerber received an AB in chemistry from Duke University in 1979. He spent 1981–82 in the Materials Science graduate program at Stanford University, and then earned MS, MPhil, and PhD degrees in applied physics from Yale University from 1981 to 1987. His doctoral dissertation was on the quantum theory of resonance scattering in solids and at solid surfaces. From 1987 to 1988 he served as a postdoctoral research fellow in the Condensed Matter Theory Group in the Department of Physics at Rutgers University.

== Career ==
Gerber began working at MIT Lincoln Laboratory as a staff member in 1988, working on problems related to the coherent signal processing of radio frequency signals over long distances. In 1991, he deployed to lead the Space Surveillance program and later the ALTAIR radar at MIT's field site at Kwajalein Atoll in the Marshall Islands. He returned to MIT Lincoln Laboratory in 1996 as an assistant group leader, and in 1997 deployed to Washington, DC as an Intergovernmental Personnel Act appointee, where he stood up a new organization and initiated the development of a next generation of radars for the Surface Navy. He returned to Lincoln Laboratory again in 2001, where he became head of the Sensor Systems Division in 2002, and associate head of the Air and Missile Defense Technology Division in 2004.

In 2015, Gerber departed MIT to take a position as senior vice president of the Georgia Institute of Technology and director of the Georgia Tech Research Institute (GTRI). GTRI is the applied research arm of Georgia Tech.

In 2018, Gerber left Georgia Tech to join a major aerospace corporation, where he served as vice president for Innovation and Strategic Pursuits and Vice President for Capabilities Analysis and Assessment before retiring in 2022.
