= Eleven Thirty Records =

Independent American record label

- Parent company: RedEye Distribution
- Founded: 2004
- Founder: Stephen Judge; Glenn Dicker
- Status: Inactive
- Genre: Various
- Country of origin: United States
- Location: Chapel Hill, North Carolina

Eleven Thirty Records is an indie label based in Chapel Hill, North Carolina and owned by RedEye Distribution. Co-founded in 2004 by A&R Director Stephen Judge and Redeye and Yep Roc Records co-owner Glenn Dicker, the label has released albums by artists such as Concrete Blonde, The Gourds, A.J. Croce, Tanya Donelly, Cowboy Mouth, David Mead, Josh Joplin, Maria McKee, Tommy Keene, Hothouse Flowers, and The Alarm.

After Judge was promoted to financial controller/general manager of Redeye/Yep Roc Records in early 2006, the label went dormant after the release of Donelly's 2006 album This Hungry Life; The Gourds moved over to Yep Roc Records in the same year. Judge continued to help sign artists such as Liam Finn, You Am I, The Cake Sale, and Bell X1 to Eleven Thirty's sister label Yep Roc Records.

Judge has since left Redeye to start his own artist management company, named Second Motion Entertainment, and works with legendary Canadian producer Daniel Lanois, as well as New Zealand punk rockers Die! Die! Die! and Swervedriver vocalist Adam Franklin. Second Motion Records launched in September 2008 and have released albums by Irish singer Gemma Hayes and former Verve Pipe vocalist Brian Vander Ark.
