= The Future That Was =

Studio album by Josh Joplin Group
- Released: September 24, 2002
- Genres: Rock, Pop
- Length: 44:38
- Label: Artemis
- Producer: Rob Gal

Josh Joplin Group chronology
Useful Music (2000)	The Future That Was (2002)	Jaywalker (2005)

The Future That Was is the second and final studio album by Josh Joplin Group. Unlike Useful Music, it did not enjoy commercial success.

Professional ratings
Review scores
Source	Rating
AllMusic	link
Paste	(favorable) link
The Morning Call	(favorable) link
Robert Christgau	link

== Track listing ==
All songs written by Josh Joplin

1. "Must Be You" – 3:13
2. "Wonderful Ones" – 3:12
3. "Listening" – 4:07
4. "Siddhartha's of Suburbia" – 3:11
5. "It's Only Entertainment" – 3:01
6. "Dishes" – 2:52
7. "I Am Not The Only Cowboy" – 4:04
8. "Lucky" – 4:05
9. "Trampoline" – 2:59
10. "Fire" – 3:11
11. "Happy At Last" – 2:53
12. "The Future That Was" – 2:50
13. "Wonder Wheel" – 5:00
