= Patrick Ferguson (drummer) =

American drummer

Patrick Ferguson is a drummer from Athens, Georgia.

He has played with Five Eight, The Low Lows, the Psychedelic Furs, Southern Bitch, Music Hates You and Vic Chesnutt, among others. As a session musician has also appeared on albums by Vigilantes of Love founder Bill Mallonee and others.

Ferguson is an identical twin. His brother, David, was the lead singer of Athens' The GoFigures

He is also a recording engineer and has worked as an assistant to Warren Riker as well as acting as drum tech for the 2008 B-52's record Funplex.

== Discography ==
With Five Eight:

- 'I Learned Shut Up' (1992)
- 'The Angriest Man' EP (1993)
- 'Weirdo' (1994)
- 'Gasolina' (1996)
- 'Your God Is Dead To Me Now' (2011)
- 'Songs For St. Jude' (2017)

With Bill Mallonee:

- 'Friendly Fire' (2005)
- 'Hit and Run' (2005)

With other artists:

- Big Atomic: 'Four Star Explosion' (1998)
- Southern Bitch: 'Thunderbolt' (2001)
- Music Hates You: 'Send More Paramedics' (2004)
- Jason Beckham: 'On the Surface' (2007)
