= Orange Recordings =

American record label

Orange Recordings is a record label that started in Chicago in 1997. In 2000 the label moved to San Diego and then relocated again to Los Angeles in the early 2002. Orange is currently headquartered in Seattle.

Some of the artists on the label include Marcellus Hall and his band White Hassle, Cash Audio, The Cells, Parker and Lily, The Mother Hips (7"), The Studdogs, Chris and Tad and The Giraffes (Chris Ballew of The Presidents of The United States of America).
