= Garrison Starr =

American musician (born 1975)

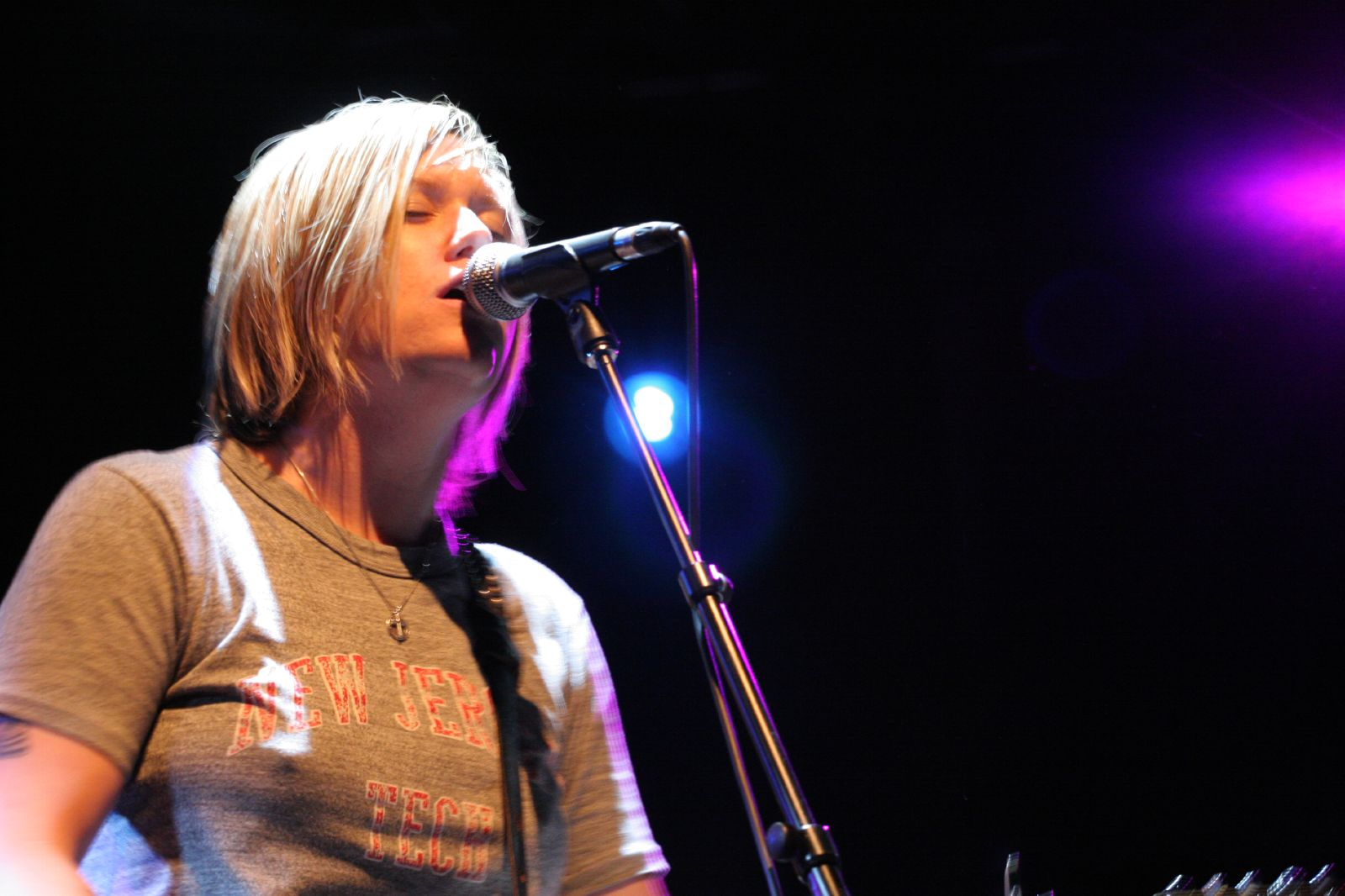
- Starr in 2007

Background information
- Born: April 29, 1975 (age 51)
- Origin: Hernando, Mississippi, US
- Genres: Rock; folk rock; country rock; indie rock
- Occupation: Musician
- Instruments: Vocals, guitar; drums
- Years active: 1993–present
- Website: garrisonstarr.com

Garrison Starr (born Julia Garrison Starr; April 29, 1975) is a Grammy-nominated American singer-songwriter/producer. Her major label debut, "18 Over Me" was released in 1997 (Geffen). Starr's shows have been described as "marrying pop smarts and Americana grit with a voice of remarkable power and clarity". Since that initial record, Starr has released over a dozen EPs and LPs while landing numerous placements on shows and movies like Grey's Anatomy, Pretty Little Liars, Nashville, Hart of Dixie, Switched at Birth, Rookie Blue, Army Wives, and Brothers & Sisters, as well as commercial placements that include Pandora, Virgin Mobile, McDonald's, and Fisher Price.

She also had cuts with Greg Holden (WBR), American Idol winner Kris Allen and Royal Wood. In 2016, Starr produced and co-wrote Margaret Cho's record "American Myth" which garnered a Grammy nomination.

== Early career ==
Starr's first album, Pinwheels, was recorded in 1993, shortly after her high school graduation from Evangelical Christian School in Memphis, TN. During a 1½ year stint as a student at Ole Miss, Starr played drums for a local band, This Living Hand, in which she met and forged a friendship with fellow artist and producer Neilson Hubbard, and Clay Jones, who would produce her first major-label album. To this day, Starr and Hubbard frequently collaborate. Her second release, the 1995 seven-track EP Stupid Girl, references her experiences at Ole Miss, which were not always pleasant.

== Geffen records ==
Starr was signed to Geffen Records, which released her first major-label album, featuring Bob Rupe of Cracker and The Silos, Eighteen Over Me, in 1997. Eighteen Over Me includes the song "Superhero," which is her most well-known song to date.

On the success of Eighteen Over Me, Starr was invited to play on the highly successful all-female festival tour Lilith Fair, created by Sarah McLachlan.

Starr left the deep south for Los Angeles in the mid-1990s. While working on her next album, Starr took issue with the label's request that she submit acoustic demos of her songs for approval. Starr (along with many other artists) was dropped from the Geffen roster.

It was five years after the release of Eighteen Over Me before Starr released her next full-length album, 2002's Songs From Take-Off To Landing. In those years, the songs that she had begun working on at Geffen evolved and changed significantly before reaching the final versions that appear on the album.

Between these releases, Starr released two EPs. The first, 24/7, was released by Geffen and included live and acoustic versions of songs from Eighteen Over Me, as well as a cover of The Beatles' "Taxman" and a previously unreleased song, "Simple Theme." The second EP, 2000's Somethin' To Hold You Over, was self-released for fans and included several original tracks, as well as a reworking of "Molly" from Eighteen and "5 Minutes," which would appear in a different form on her next album.

In Los Angeles, she gained inspiration for two albums, Songs from Take-Off To Landing and Airstreams and Satellites, which was released in October 2004. The former album was released by Virgin Records' Back Porch Records label. The latter was released by Vanguard Records.

Starr re-recorded "Superhero" for Airstreams, which also includes a hidden track, "Inside Out", in which she makes her first definitive reference to being a lesbian. In promoting the album, Starr toured with the likes of Melissa Etheridge, Steve Earle, Melissa Ferrick and Mary Chapin Carpenter. She has been out since then.

In 2005, Starr appeared with other artists in a series of performances at L.A.'s Room 5 as the North La Brea All Star Conquistadors. These performances were later released in a series of live albums by KUFALA Recordings. The group, consisting of Starr, Gabriel Mann, Jay Nash, and Adrianne, toured the eastern United States in spring 2007.

Also in 2005, Starr returned to the south to Nashville, Tennessee, where she completed The Sound of You and Me, which was released in March 2006. Released by Vanguard Records, it includes a fellow Vanguard artist Mindy Smith on background vocals for the track "We Were Just Boys and Girls."

In 2007, Starr completed a collection of songs, Fans' Greatest Hits, Volume One (Live) for which she asked fans to vote for their top 10 favorite songs. She then recorded new acoustic studio versions of those songs.

Starr released The Girl That Killed September on October 18, 2007, in association with Media Creature Music.

In 2008, Starr formed a new band with Josh Joplin called Among The Oak & Ash. Their self-titled debut album was released on June 16, 2009, on Verve Records.

In 2009, Starr formed a new band with Glen Phillips, singer for '90s alt-rock band Toad the Wet Sprocket. They called themselves Plover and released a self-titled album in 2009.

In 2010, Starr released ReLive, a critically acclaimed live album featuring fan favorites as well as some new tracks. The album was recorded at Nashville's 12th and Porter during one take and released via Brite Revolution.

In 2012, Starr embarked on her first attempt at a self-release. Amateur, featuring all original songs with a guest appearance including Mary Chapin Carpenter and a co-write with Kevin Devine was entirely fan funded via the crowd funding site PledgeMusic, and released May 1, 2012.

In September 2013, Starr formed a new project called This, the Silent War. The first single "Setting Sun" was released on October 1, 2013.

In 2017, Starr released What If There Is No Destination, led off by the single "Put Your Weapon Down", with the profits from this single going to the National Center for Victims of Crime for the victims of the Orlando tragedy.

In 2019, Starr provided original music for Margaret Cho's podcast, The Margaret Cho.

She is currently based in Los Angeles.

== Other media appearances ==
Starr's song "Superhero" has appeared on several compilations, including Live at World Cafe and CMJ magazine's sampler. It was featured during ABC-TV's coverage of the Women's World Cup Soccer in 1999.

Her cover of Steve Forbert's song "It Isn't Going to Be That Way" appeared on the compilation The I-10 Chronicles, Vol. 2: One More for the Road.

Starr's "Beautiful in Los Angeles" was the featured song on the season one finale of MTV's original program The Hills.

Starr has performed back-up vocals for artists including Michelle Malone and Mary Chapin Carpenter.

Starr appeared on CBS News' Saturday Early Show, performing in the "Second Cup Cafe" on June 22, 2007.

Her songs have been featured in Life Unexpected, Pretty Little Liars, The Fosters and Grey's Anatomy.

== Discography ==
Year	Album title
1993	Pinwheels
1995	Stupid Girl
1997	eighteen over me
1998	24/7 (EP)
2000	Somethin' to Hold You Over (EP)
2002	Songs from Take-Off to Landing
2004	Airstreams & Satellites
2006	The Sound of You and Me
2007	Fans' Greatest Hits, Volume One (Live)
2007	The Girl That Killed September
2010	ReLive
2012	Not for Nothing (EP)
2012	Amateur
2014	The Forgotten Street
2017	What If There Is No Destination
2017	Lovey Dovey
2021	Girl I Used to Be
