= Pistolera (band) =

American musical band

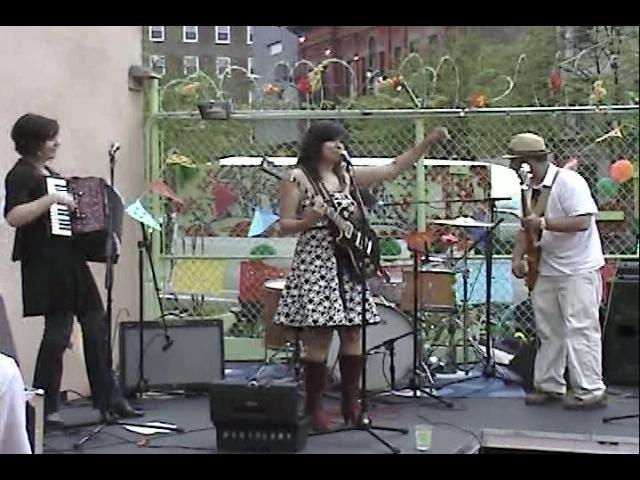
Pistolera in 2008.

Pistolera (Spanish for "female gunslinger") is a music group that was founded in 2005 in Brooklyn, New York, by Mexican-American songwriter Sandra Lilia Velásquez, Maria Elena, Inca B. Satz, and Ani Cordero. To date, they have released three albums: Siempre Hay Salida (2006), En Este Camino (2008), and El Desierto Y La Ciudad (2011), and have performed numerous shows in the United States and abroad.

In 2008, Lila Downs invited them to open for her at Town Hall in New York City. That same year, they opened for Los Lobos at Massey Hall in Toronto and at The Birchmere in the United States as part of the Mexican Tourism Board and National Geographic Traveler Magazine Series. Their 2008 showcase at globalFEST in New York City resulted in invitations to perform at many festivals such as the Montreal Jazz Festival, Sfinks Festival (Belgium), Ollin Kan (Mexico), Celebrate Brooklyn (USA), Central Park Summerstage (USA), Ritmo y Color (Canada), the Lake Eden Arts Festival (USA), Lotus Fest (USA), and Roots and Blues Festival (Canada). In 2010, drummer Ani Cordero left the band, and was replaced by Sebastian Guerrero.

The release of their third album, El Desierto Y La Ciudad, was a sonic departure for the band that earned them praise from the likes of NPR, The Wall Street Journal, and The Village Voice. The album was featured on NPR's First Listen for which Felix Contreras wrote, "…inventive sense of arrangement, combined with great songwriting, elevates El Desierto y la Ciudad above and beyond its traditional source material. The result is a major step forward for a songwriter and a band that deserves wider recognition. With this album, Pistolera just might get it."

In 2011, the band was invited to perform a Tiny Desk Concert at the NPR office in Washington, D.C.

== Members ==
- Maria Elena (accordion)
- Inca B. Satz (bass)
- Ani Cordero (drummer until 2010)
- Sebastian Guerrero (current drummer as of 2010)
- Sandra Lilia Velasquez (vocals and guitar)

== Discography ==
- Siempre Hay Salida (2006)
- En Este Camino (2008)
- El Desierto Y La Ciudad (2011)

== In pop culture ==
Their song, "Nuevos Ojos", was featured in Season 4, Episode 12 of the AMC TV show Breaking Bad.
