= Five Eight (band) =

American band

Five Eight is a band from Athens, Georgia, USA.

== Overview ==
The original three members of the band were Mike Mantione on vocals and guitar, Dan Horowitz on bass guitar, and Mike Palmatier on drums. In 1989, Palmatier's right leg was crushed in a work-related accident at the Armstrong and Dobbs lumberyard in Athens. He was temporarily replaced by Patrick Ferguson, the drummer for the LaBrea Stompers and Angle Lake—a band which also included Vic Chesnutt. Palmatier returned to the Boston area. Ferguson rejoined the band and was Five Eight's full-time drummer until 1998. After the release of "I Learned Shut Up," guitarist Sean Dunn joined the band and was a full-time member for the recording of "The Angriest Man" EP. Between 1992 and 1998, Five Eight toured. extensively as a four-piece in the United States and Canada and played 200 shows or more a year. Ferguson left the band in 1998 and was soon followed by Dunn. Ferguson was briefly replaced by former Bughummer, Little Red Rocket and The Runs drummer Scott Sosebee. Drummer Mike Rizzi joined Five Eight in 1999 and remained until mid-2007. The band went on hiatus when Rizzi moved to Southern California to join Ghost Hounds. Ferguson rejoined the band to play "a few shows" near the end of 2007 and is again the full-time drummer for the group.

Since 1992, Five Eight has recorded eight albums. They previously toured with R.E.M. and have performed with Cheap Trick, The Ramones, Cracker, Pylon, and Seven Mary Three. The group is prominent in the Athens/Atlanta area and has played at Athens Recovery Fest. The band came together in 1988 in Athens when an earlier incarnation, known as The Reasonable Men, disbanded. Before settling on the name Five Eight, they played at least one show under the name The Helgrammites.

The ninth Five Eight offering, titled "Your God Is Dead To Me Now," was recorded in 2010 and released in early 2011. Sean Dunn rejoined the group for this album. In July 2017, Five Eight released their tenth album, "Songs for St. Jude," a double album on Chicken Ranch Records with appearances by Patterson Hood and Jack Logan.

The band is the subject of the feature documentary Weirdo: The Story of Five Eight, directed by former journalist Marc Pilvinsky. The film premiered at the Ciné Athens on September 28, 2024, followed by a Q&A and a Five Eight rock show in the same venue. The band, movie and filmmaker Marc Pilvinsky toured together to many cities in the southeast in 2024 and 2025, including Athens, Atlanta, Birmingham, New Orleans, Houston, Austin, Tampa, Gainesville (Florida), Pensacola, Asheville, and others. The movie was released on blu-ray and DVD in December 2025.

Five Eight’s ninth full-length album, Help a Sinner, will be released by Static Era Records in spring, 2026. The first single, “Take Me to the Skate Park,” (complete with music video directed by Jason Thrasher) was released in March of 2024. The second single, “I’m Alone,” was released on November 7th, 2025 (complete with music video directed by Marc Pilvinsky). The music video for “I’m Alone” premiered at the Georgia Theatre in Athens, Georgia, at the Nuçi’s Space 25th Anniversary show on December 12, 2025.

== Band members ==
- Mike Mantione (singer/songwriter/guitar)
- Dan Horowitz (bass)
- Patrick "Tigger" Ferguson (drums)
- Sean Dunn (guitar)

== Discography ==
Title	Year
Passive-Aggressive (cassette demo)	1989
Inflatable Sense of Self (cassette demo)	1991
I Learned Shut Up	1992
The Angriest Man	1993
Weirdo	1994
Gasolina	1997
The Good Nurse	2000
Five Eight	2004
Your God Is Dead To Me Now	2010
Songs For St. Jude	2017
Help a Sinner	2026
